= Set Decorators Society of America Awards =

American scenic design awards

- Country: United States
- Presented by: Set Decorators Society of America
- First award: 2020
- Website: www.setdecorators.org?name=SDSA-Awards&art=sdsa-awards

The Set Decorators Society of America (SDSA) Awards are awards honoring the best set decorators in film and television of each year. The inaugural SDSA Film Awards were held on March 31, 2021, and nominations were announced March 11, 2021. The first SDSA Television Awards took place on July 30, 2021, and the nominations were unveiled on June 16, 2021.

== Categories ==
=== Film ===
- Best Achievement in Decor/Design of a Feature Film – Period
- Best Achievement in Decor/Design of a Feature Film – Science Fiction or Fantasy
- Best Achievement in Decor/Design of a Feature Film – Contemporary
- Best Achievement in Decor/Design of a Feature Film – Musical or Comedy
- Best Picture

=== Television ===
- Best Achievement in Decor/Design of a One Hour Contemporary Series
- Best Achievement in Decor/Design of a One Hour Fantasy or Science Fiction Series
- Best Achievement in Decor/Design of a One Hour Period Series
- Best Achievement in Decor/Design of a Television Movie or Limited Series
- Best Achievement in Decor/Design of a Half-Hour Single-Camera Series
- Best Achievement in Decor/Design of a Half-Hour Multi-Camera Series
- Best Achievement in Decor/Design of a Short Format: Webseries, Music Video or Commercial
- Best Achievement in Decor/Design of a Variety, Reality or Competition Series
- Best Achievement in Decor/Design of a Variety Special
- Best Achievement in Decor/Design of a Daytime Series

== Ceremonies ==
=== 1st, 2020 ===
The inaugural SDSA Film Awards were held on March 31, 2021, and nominations were announced March 11, 2021.

Best Achievement in Decor/Design of a Contemporary Feature Film	Best Achievement in Decor/Design of a Period Feature Film
Promising Young Woman – Rae Deslich (Set Decoration); Michael T. Perry (Production Design); Da 5 Bloods – Jeanette Scott (Set Decoration); Wynn Thomas (Production Design); Hillbilly Elegy – Merissa Lombardo (Set Decoration); Molly Hughes (Production Design); I'm Thinking of Ending Things – Mattie Siegal (Set Decoration); Molly Hughes (Production Design); Sound of Metal – Tara Pavoni (Set Decoration); Jeremy Woodward (Production Design)	Mank – Jan Pascale (Set Decoration); Donald Graham Burt (Production Design); Emma – Stella Fox (Set Decoration); Kave Quinn (Production Design); Ma Rainey's Black Bottom – Karen O'Hara, Diana Stoughton (Set Decoration); Mark Ricker (Production Design); News of the World – Elizabeth Keenan (Set Decoration); David Crank (Production Design); The Trial of the Chicago 7 – Andrew Baseman (Set Decoration); Shane Valentino (Production Design)
Best Achievement in Decor/Design of a Science Fiction or Fantasy Feature Film	Best Achievement in Decor/Design of a Comedy or Musical Feature Film
Tenet – Kathy Lucas (Set Decoration); Nathan Crowley (Production Design); The Midnight Sky – John Bush (Set Decoration); Jim Bissell (Production Design); Palm Springs – Kelsi Ephraim (Set Decoration); Jason Kisvarday (Production Design); Roald Dahl's The Witches – Raffaella Giovannetti (Set Decoration); Gary Freeman (Production Design); Wonder Woman 1984 – Anna Lynch-Robinson (Set Decoration); Aline Bonetto (Production Design)	The Prom – Gene Serdena (Set Decoration); Jamie Walker McCall (Production Design); Borat Subsequent Moviefilm – Alina Pentac (Set Decoration); David Saenz de Maturana (Production Design); Dolittle – Lee Sandales (Set Decoration); Dominic Watkins (Production Design); Eurovision Song Contest: The Story of Fire Saga – Naomi Moore (Set Decoration); Paul Inglis (Production Design); The King of Staten Island – David Schlesinger (Set Decoration); Kevin Thompson (Production Design)

The nominations for the television categories were announced on June 17, 2021, while the winners were announced on July 30, 2021.

Best Achievement in Decor/Design of a One Hour Contemporary Series	Best Achievement in Decor/Design of a One Hour Fantasy or Science Fiction Series
Ozark – Kim Leoleis (Set Decoration); David Bomba (Production Design); Billions – Stephanie Q. Bowen (Set Decoration); Jim Gloster (Production Design); Euphoria – Julia Altschul (Set Decoration); Jason Baldwin Stewart (Production Design); The Flight Attendant – Jessica Petruccelli (Set Decoration); Sara K. White (Production Design); Yellowstone – Carla Curry (Set Decoration); Cary White (Production Design)	The Handmaid's Tale – Rob Hepburn (Set Decoration); Elisabeth Williams (Production Design); For All Mankind – Dianna Freas (Set Decoration); Dan Bishop (Production Design); Lovecraft Country – Summer Eubanks (Set Decoration); Kalina Ivanov (Production Design); The Mandalorian – Amanda Serino (Set Decoration); Andrew L. Jones, Doug Chiang (Production Design); The Umbrella Academy – Jim Lambie (Set Decoration); Mark Steel (Production Design)
Best Achievement in Decor/Design of a One Hour Period Series	Best Achievement in Decor/Design of a Television Movie or Limited Series
The Crown – Alison Harvey, Carolyn Boult, Sophie Coombes (Set Decoration); Martin Childs (Production Design); Bridgerton – Gina Cromwell (Set Decoration); Will Hughes-Jones (Production Design); Penny Dreadful: City of Angels – Brent David Mannon (Set Decoration); Maria Caso (Production Design); Perry Mason – Halina Siwolop (Set Decoration); John Perry Goldsmith (Production Design); Ratched – Matthew Flood Ferguson (Set Decoration); Judy Becker (Production Design)	The Queen's Gambit – Sabine Schaaf (Set Decoration); Uli Hanisch (Production Design); Fargo – Chuck Potter (Set Decoration); Warren Alan Young (Production Design); Halston – Cherish M. Hale (Set Decoration); Mark Ricker (Production Design); Hollywood – Melissa Licht (Set Decoration); Matthew Flood Ferguson (Production Design); Mare of Easttown – Edward McLoughlin, Sarah E. McMillan (Set Decoration); Keith P. Cunningham (Production Design)
Best Achievement in Decor/Design of a Half-Hour Single-Camera Series	Best Achievement in Decor/Design of a Half-Hour Multi-Camera Series
Hacks – Ellen Reede Dorros (Set Decoration); Jonathan Carlos (Production Design); Dead to Me – Brandi Kalish (Set Decoration); L.J. Houdyshell (Production Design); Dickinson – Marina Parker (Set Decoration); Neil Patel, Loren Weeks (Production Design); Emily in Paris – Christelle Maisonneuve (Set Decoration); Anne Seibel (Production Design); The Kominsky Method – Debra Echard (Set Decoration); Denny Dugally (Production Design)	Call Your Mother – Amy Feldman (Set Decoration); Glenda Rovello (Production Design); The Conners – Anne H. Ahrens (Set Decoration); John Shaffner (Production Design); Mom – Ann Shea (Set Decoration); John Shaffner (Production Design); United States of Al – Susan Mina Eschelbach (Set Decoration); John Shaffner (Production Design); Will & Grace – Peter Gurski (Set Decoration); Glenda Rovello (Production Design)
Best Achievement in Decor/Design of a Short Format: Webseries, Music Video or Commercial	Best Achievement in Decor/Design of a Variety, Reality or Competition Series
Adidas Originals Superstar: "Change is a Team Sport" – Chilly Nathan (Set Decoration); Ruth De Jong (Production Design); Apple: "Vertical Cinema" – Gail Otter (Set Decoration); Shane Valentino (Production Design); Ariana Grande: "34+35" – Rand Sagers (Set Decoration); David Courtemarche (Production Design); Harry Styles: "Falling" – Neil Wyzanowski (Set Decoration); Francois Audouy (Production Design); Taylor Swift: "Cardigan" – Jill Crawford (Set Decoration); Ethan Tobman (Production Design)	Saturday Night Live – Carol Silverman, Kimberly Kachougian, Danielle Webb (Set Decoration); Keith Raywood, Eugene Lee, Leo Yoshimura, N. Joseph Detullio (Production Design); Dancing with the Stars – John Sparano (Set Decoration); Florian Andreas Wieder (Production Design); The Masked Singer – Emily Auble (Set Decoration); James P. Connelly (Production Design); Supermarket Sweep – Rae Deslich (Set Decoration); Stuart Frossell (Production Design); The Voice – Priscilla Cordoba Tarkington, Stephanie Trigg Hines, Jeremiah Gastinell (Set Decoration); James P. Connelly, Zeya Maurer, Anton Goss (Production Design)
Best Achievement in Decor/Design of a Variety Special	Best Achievement in Decor/Design of a Daytime Series
Yearly Departed – Doug Mowat (Set Decoration); Suzuki Ingerslev (Production Design); Black Is King – Sandy Hubshman, Maile Cassara, Jill Crawford, Lila Yanow (Set Decoration); Hannah Beachler, Carlos Laszlo, Susan Linss, Miranda Lorenz, Brandon Mendez, Rika Nakanishi, Ethan Tobman (Production Design); Death to 2020 – Mercedes Hachuel (Set Decoration); Ros Cumberland, Eric Schoonover (Production Design); Kevin Hart: Zero F**ks Given – Brandi Kalish (Set Decoration); Justin Collie (Production Design); Sarah Cooper: Everything's Fine – Sofia Midon (Set Decoration); J.C. Molina (Production Design)	The Young and the Restless – Jennifer Haybach, Justine Mercado, Raquel Tarbet (Set Decoration); David Hoffman (Production Design); The Bold and the Beautiful – Charlotte Garnell, Kelley Pearce (Set Decoration); Jack Forrestel (Production Design); Days of Our Lives – Adele Caine (Set Decoration); Tom Early (Production Design); General Hospital – Jennifer Elliott (Set Decoration); Andrew Evashchen (Production Design); The Kelly Clarkson Show – Emily Auble (Set Decoration); James P. Connelly (Production Design)

=== 2nd, 2021 ===
The nominations for the film categories were announced on January 17, 2022, while the winners were announced via YouTube on February 22, 2022.

Best Achievement in Decor/Design of a Contemporary Feature Film	Best Achievement in Decor/Design of a Period Feature Film
No Time to Die – Véronique Melery (Set Decoration); Mark Tildesley (Production Design); CODA – Vanessa Knoll (Set Decoration); Diane Lederman (Production Design); Don't Look Up – Tara Pavoni (Set Decoration); Clayton Hartley (Production Design); The Hand of God – Iole Autero (Set Decoration); Carmine Guarino (Production Design); The Lost Daughter – Christine-Athina Vlachos (Set Decoration); Inbal Weinberg (Production Design)	Being the Ricardos – Ellen Brill (Set Decoration); Jon Hutman (Production Design); House of Gucci – Letizia Santucci (Set Decoration); Arthur Max (Production Design); Licorice Pizza – Ryan Watson (Set Decoration); Florencia Martin (Production Design); Nightmare Alley – Shane Vieau (Set Decoration); Tamara Deverell (Production Design); The Power of the Dog – Amber Richards (Set Decoration); Grant Major (Production Design)
Best Achievement in Decor/Design of a Science Fiction or Fantasy Feature Film	Best Achievement in Decor/Design of a Comedy or Musical Feature Film
Dune – Zsuzsanna Sipos (Set Decoration); Patrice Vermette (Production Design); The King's Man – Dominic Capon (Set Decoration); Darren Gilford (Production Design); The Matrix Resurrections – Lisa Brennan, Barbara Munch (Set Decoration); Hugh Bateup, Peter Walpole (Production Design); Spider-Man: No Way Home – Rosemary Brandenburg (Set Decoration); Darren Gilford (Production Design); The Tragedy of Macbeth – Nancy Haigh (Set Decoration); Stefan Dechant (Production Design)	The French Dispatch – Rena DeAngelo (Set Decoration); Adam Stockhausen (Production Design); Cruella – Alice Felton (Set Decoration); Fiona Crombie (Production Design); Cyrano – Katie Spencer (Set Decoration); Sarah Greenwood (Production Design); tick, tick... BOOM! – Lydia Marks (Set Decoration); Alex DiGerlando (Production Design); West Side Story – Rena DeAngelo (Set Decoration); Adam Stockhausen (Production Design)

The nominations for the television categories were announced on June 15, 2022, while the winners are set to be announced via YouTube on August 2, 2022.

Best Achievement in Décor/Design of a One Hour Contemporary Series	Best Achievement in Décor/Design of a One Hour Fantasy or Science Fiction Series
Succession – George DeTitta Jr. (Set Decoration); Stephen Carter (Production Design); Ozark – Kim Leoleis (Set Decoration); David Bomba (Production Design); Severance – Andrew Baseman (Set Decoration); Jeremy Hindle (Production Design); The White Lotus – Jennifer Lukehart (Set Decoration); Laura Fox (Production Design); Yellowstone – Carla Curry (Set Decoration); Cary White (Production Design)	Stranger Things – Jess Royal (Set Decoration); Chris Trujillo (Production Design); American Horror Stories – Sandra Skora (Set Decoration); Eve McCarney (Production Design); The Handmaid's Tale – Rob Hepburn (Set Decoration); Elisabeth Williams (Production Design); Loki – Claudia Bonfe (Set Decoration); Kasra Farahani (Production Design); Star Trek: Picard – Timothy Stepeck (Set Decoration); David Blass (Production Design)
Best Achievement in Décor/Design of a One Hour Period Series	Best Achievement in Décor/Design of a Television Movie or Limited Series
The Marvelous Mrs. Maisel – Ellen Christiansen (Set Decoration); Bill Groom (Production Design); Bridgerton – Gina Cromwell (Set Decoration); Will Hughes-Jones (Production Design); The Gilded Age – Regina Graves (Set Decoration); Bob Shaw (Production Design); The Great – Monica Alberte (Set Decoration); Francesca Di Mottola (Production Design); Winning Time: The Rise of the Lakers Dynasty – Jon Bush (Set Decoration); Richard Toyon, Clayton Hartley (Production Design)	Obi-Wan Kenobi – Jan Pascale (Set Decoration); Todd Cherniawsky, Doug Chiang (Production Design); A Very British Scandal – Philippa Hart (Set Decoration); Christina Moore (Production Design); The Dropout – Kimberly Leonard (Set Decoration); Cat Smith (Production Design); Gaslit – Jennifer Lukehart (Set Decoration); Daniel Novotny (Production Design); Pam & Tommy – Nya Patrinos (Set Decoration); Ethan Tobman, David Batchelor Wilson (Production Design)
Best Achievement in Décor/Design of a Half-Hour Single-Camera Series	Best Achievement in Décor/Design of a Half-Hour Multi-Camera Series
Hacks – Jennifer Lukehart (Set Decoration); Alec Contestabile (Production Design); Atlanta – Lisbeth Ayala (Set Decoration); Timothy David O'Brien, Jonathan Paul Green (Production Design); Dickinson – Marina Parker (Set Decoration); Neil Patel (Production Design); Emily in Paris – Christelle Maisonneuve (Set Decoration); Anne Seibel (Production Design); Insecure – Amber Haley (Set Decoration); Kay Lee (Production Design); Russian Doll – Lindsay Stephen (Set Decoration); Diane Lederman (Production Design)	How I Met Your Father – Amy Feldman (Set Decoration); Glenda Rovello (Production Design); Bob Hearts Abishola – Ann Shea (Set Decoration); Francoise Cherry-Cohen (Production Design); Call Me Kat – Christopher Marsteller (Set Decoration); Greg J. Grande (Production Design); How We Roll – Ron Olsen (Set Decoration); Bernard Vyzga (Production Design); The Neighborhood – Ron Olsen (Set Decoration); Wendell Johnson (Production Design); The United States of Al – Susan Mina Eschelbach (Set Decoration); Daren Janes (Production Design)
Best Achievement in Décor/Design of a Short Format: Webseries, Music Video or Commercial	Best Achievement in Décor/Design of a Variety, Reality or Competition
Apple Music: Billie Eilish: "Happier Than Ever" – Jill Crawford (Set Decoration); Francois Audouy (Production Design); Coldplay x BTS: "My Universe" – Joan Sabaté (Set Decoration); Patrick Tatopoulos (Production Design); Ed Sheeran: "Shivers" – Sandy Lindstedt (Set Decoration); Francois Audouy (Production Design); Gucci: "Aria" – Christina Scipioni (Set Decoration); Jeremy Reed (Production Design); Taylor Swift: All Too Well: The Short Film – Mila Khalevich (Set Decoration); Ethan Tobman (Production Design)	Harry Potter: Hogwarts Tournament of Houses – Heidi Miller (Set Decoration); John Janavs (Production Design); Dancing with the Stars – John Sparano (Set Decoration); Florian Andreas Wieder (Production Design); Lizzo's Watch Out for the Big Grrrls – Bryant Berry (Set Decoration); James McGowan (Production Design); Supermarket Sweep – Rae Deslich (Set Decoration); Stuart Frossell (Production Design); Saturday Night Live – Kimberly Kachougian, Danielle Webb, Kimberley Fischer, Jessica Templin King (Set Decoration); Eugene Lee, Keith Raywood, Akira Yoshimura, Joe Detullio, Andrea Purcigliotti, Ken MacLeod, Mark Newell (Production Design)
Best Achievement in Décor/Design of a Variety Special	Best Achievement in Décor/Design of a Daytime Series
Live in Front of a Studio Audience: "The Facts of Life" and "Diff'rent Strokes" – Jerie Kelter (Set Decoration); Stephan Olson (Production Design); The 64th Annual Grammy Awards – KayDee Lavorin (Set Decoration); Julio Himede (Production Design); Days of Our Lives: A Very Salem Christmas – Adele Caine (Set Decoration); Tom Early (Production Design); Jerrod Carmichael: Rothaniel – Kendall Anderson (Set Decoration); Sam Lisenco (Production Design); Savage X Fenty Show Vol. 3 – Vince Rodriguez (Set Decoration); Steve Morden (Production Design); Yearly Departed – Alison Korth (Set Decoration); Frida Oliva (Production Design)	The Young and the Restless – Jennifer Haybach, Maria Dirolf (Set Decoration); David Hoffman (Production Design); The Bold and the Beautiful – Charlotte Garnell (Set Decoration); Jack Forrestel (Production Design); Days of Our Lives – Adele Caine (Set Decoration); Tom Early (Production Design); Days of Our Lives: Beyond Salem – Adele Caine (Set Decoration); Tom Early (Production Design); General Hospital – Jennifer Elliott (Set Decoration); Andrew Evashchen (Production Design)

=== 3rd, 2022 ===
The nominations for the film categories were announced on January 5, 2023, while the winners were announced via YouTube on February 14, 2023.

The SDSA Honors took place on April 23, 2023, at the Universal Sheraton in Universal City, California, which recognized the recipients of the film categories; a ceremony for the television winner recipients did not occur. The event also conferred with the "SDSA COC Silent Art Auction", online and in-person, to benefit "Set for Life", a charitable organization that creates "safe and comfortable homes for youths aging out of foster care and youths experiencing homelessness". The SDSA also presented the "SDSA Earl Cooperman Lifetime Achievement Award" to set decorator Mary Ann Biddle, the "Humanitarian Award" to Adrianna Cruz Ocampo, the "Hall of Fame Award" to Chase Helzer, and "Business Member of the Year" to Allan Songer of Omega Cinema Props. The "Chair Awards" were presented to JoAnn Vara (VP Business Member), Bridge Furniture & Props, SDSA President Gene Serdena, Carol Bayne Kelley, Cathy T. Marshall, and Libby Woolems. The 2023 "SDSA Chair" hold tags were given to Rosemary Brandenburg, Karen Burg, and Beth Wooke.

Three scholarships were also awarded in honor of Leslie Frankenheimer (sponsored by Lennie Marvin's Prop Heaven), Robinson Royce (sponsored by RC Vintage), and Marvin March (sponsored by SDSA and IATSE Local 44).

Best Achievement in Décor/Design of a Contemporary Feature Film	Best Achievement in Décor/Design of a Period Feature Film
Tár – Ernestine Hipper (Set Decoration); Marco Bittner Rosser (Production Design) (TIE); Top Gun: Maverick – Jan Pascale (Set Decoration); Jeremy Hindle (Production Design) (TIE); Bardo, False Chronicle of a Handful of Truths – Daniela Rojas Mont (Set Decoration); Eugenio Caballero (Production Design); Bullet Train – Elizabeth Keenan (Set Decoration); David Scheunemann (Production Design); Glass Onion: A Knives Out Mystery – Elli Griff (Set Decoration); Rick Heinrichs (Production Design)	Elvis – Bev Dunn (Set Decoration); Catherine Martin and Karen Murphy (Production Design); Amsterdam – Patricia Cuccia (Set Decoration); Judy Becker (Production Design); Babylon – Anthony Carlino (Set Decoration); Florencia Martin (Production Design); The Fabelmans – Karen O'Hara (Set Decoration); Rick Carter (Production Design); White Noise – Claire Kaufman (Set Decoration); Jess Gonchor (Production Design)
Best Achievement in Décor/Design of a Science Fiction or Fantasy Feature Film	Best Achievement in Décor/Design of a Comedy or Musical Feature Film
Everything Everywhere All at Once – Kelsi Ephraim (Set Decoration); Jason Kisvarday (Production Design); Avatar: The Way of Water – Vanessa Cole (Set Decoration); Dylan Cole and Ben Procter (Production Design); The Batman – Lee Sandales (Set Decoration); James Chinlund (Production Design); Black Panther: Wakanda Forever – Lisa Sessions Morgan (Set Decoration); Hannah Beachler (Production Design); Don't Worry Darling – Rachel Ferrara (Set Decoration); Katie Byron (Production Design)	Matilda the Musical – Anna Lynch-Robinson (Set Decoration); David Hindle and Christian Huband (Production Design) (TIE); The Unbearable Weight of Massive Talent – Letizia Santucci (Set Decoration); Kevin Kavanaugh (Production Design) (TIE); Bros – Nicki Ritchie (Set Decoration); Lisa Myers (Production Design); Lyle, Lyle, Crocodile – Kathy Orlando (Set Decoration); Mark Worthington (Production Design); Spirited – Lori Mazeur (Set Decoration); Clayton Hartley (Production Design)

The nominations for the television categories were announced on June 14, 2023, while the winners were announced on August 2, also via YouTube.

Best Achievement in Décor/Design of a One Hour Contemporary Series	Best Achievement in Décor/Design of a One Hour Fantasy or Science Fiction Series
Succession – George DeTitta Jr. and Brandi Kalish (Set Decoration); Stephen Carter (Production Design) (HBO); The Old Man – David Smith and Tamar Barnoon (Set Decoration); Julie Berghoff (Production Design) (FX); Poker Face – Cathy T. Marshall and Elizabeth Eggert (Set Decoration); Judy Rhee (Production Design) (Peacock); The White Lotus – Letizia Santucci (Set Decoration); Cristina Onori (Production Design) (HBO); Yellowstone – Suzanne Stover (Set Decoration); Yvonne Boudreaux (Production Design) (Paramount Network)	Wednesday – Rob Hepburn and David Morison (Set Decoration); Mark Scruton (Production Design) (Netflix); Guillermo del Toro's Cabinet of Curiosities – Shane Vieau (Set Decoration); Tamara Deverell (Production Design) (Netflix); The Last of Us – Paul Healy (Set Decoration); John Paino (Production Design) (HBO); The Lord of the Rings: The Rings of Power – Megan Vertelle (Set Decoration); Ramsey Avery (Production Design) (Prime Video); The Mandalorian – Amanda Moss Serino (Set Decoration); Doug Chiang and Andrew L. Jones (Production Design) (Disney+)
Best Achievement in Décor/Design of a One Hour Period Series	Best Achievement in Décor/Design of a Television Movie or Limited Series
The Marvelous Mrs. Maisel – Ellen Christiansen (Set Decoration); Bill Groom (Production Design) (Prime Video); 1923 – Carla Curry, Thomas Olive, and Sandra Zaffarese (Set Decoration); Cary White (Production Design) (Paramount+); Dahmer – Monster: The Jeffrey Dahmer Story – Melissa Licht (Set Decoration); Matthew Flood Ferguson (Production Design) (Netflix); The Great – Violet Elliot (Set Decoration); Francesca Di Mottola (Production Design) (Hulu); Perry Mason – Halina Siwolop (Set Decoration); Keith P. Cunningham (Production Design) (HBO); Power Book III: Raising Kanan – Karin Wiesel Holmes (Set Decoration); Tania Bijlani (Production Design) (Starz)	Daisy Jones & the Six – Lisa Clark and Andi Brittan (Set Decoration); Jessica Kender (Production Design) (Prime Video); George & Tammy – James V. Kent (Set Decoration); Jonah Markowitz (Production Design) (Showtime); Queen Charlotte: A Bridgerton Story – Kevin Downey (Set Decoration); David Ingram (Production Design) (Netflix); Welcome to Chippendales – Linette McCown and Marianne Broughton (Set Decoration); Richard Bloom (Production Design) (Hulu); White House Plumbers – Lisa Scoppa (Set Decoration); Anastasia White (Production Design) (HBO)
Best Achievement in Décor/Design of a Half-Hour Single-Camera Series	Best Achievement in Décor/Design of a Half-Hour Multi-Camera Series
Only Murders in the Building – Rich Murray (Set Decoration); Patrick Howe (Production Design) (Hulu); The Bear – Eric Frankel (Set Decoration); Merje Veski (Production Design) (FX on Hulu); Beef – Kellie Jo Tinney (Set Decoration); Grace Yun (Production Design) (Netflix); Emily in Paris – Isabelle Girard (Set Decoration); Anne Seibel (Production Design) (Netflix); Ted Lasso – Kate Goodman (Set Decoration); Paul Cripps (Production Design) (Apple TV+)	That '90s Show – Tara Stephenson (Set Decoration); Greg J. Grande (Production Design) (Netflix); Bob Hearts Abishola – Ann Shea (Set Decoration); Francoise Cherry-Cohen (Production Design) (CBS); The Conners – Anne H. Ahrens (Set Decoration); Jerry Dunn (Production Design) (ABC); How I Met Your Father – Amy Feldman (Set Decoration); Glenda Rovello (Production Design) (Hulu); Night Court – Peter Gurski (Set Decoration); Glenda Rovello (Production Design) (NBC)
Best Achievement in Décor/Design of a Short Format: Webseries, Music Video or Commercial	Best Achievement in Décor/Design of a Variety, Reality or Competition Series or Special
Stella Artois's "Let's Do Dinner" – Keri Lederman (Set Decoration); Latisha Duarte (Production Design); Adele's "I Drink Wine" – Jaime Beebe (Set Decoration); Liam Moore (Production Design); Just Eat & Katy Perry's "Did Somebody Say" – Jill Crawford (Set Decoration); François Audouy (Production Design); Taylor Swift's "Anti-Hero" – Jill Crawford (Set Decoration); Ethan Tobman (Production Design); Taylor Swift's "Bejeweled" – Jill Crawford (Set Decoration); Ethan Tobman (Production Design)	Encanto at the Hollywood Bowl – Raquel Tarbet (Set Decoration); Misty Buckley (Production Design) (Disney+); The Big Brunch – Heidi Miller (Set Decoration); David Korins (Production Design) (Max); Dancing with the Stars – John Sparano (Set Decoration); Florian Andreas Wieder (Production Design) (Disney+); The Masked Singer – John Sparano (Set Decoration); Steve Morden (Production Design) (Fox); The Voice – Christina Limgenco and Stephanie Trigg Hines (Set Decoration); James Pearse Connelly (Production Design) (NBC)
Best Achievement in Décor/Design of a Daytime Series
The Young and the Restless – Maria Dirolf, Jennifer Haybach, and Justine Mercado (Set Decoration); David Hoffmann (Production Design) (CBS); The Bold and the Beautiful – Charlotte Garnell (Set Decoration); Jack Forrestel (Production Design) (CBS); Days of Our Lives – Adele Caine (Set Decoration); Tom Early (Production Design) (NBC / Peacock); General Hospital – Jennifer Elliott (Set Decoration); Andrew Evaschen (Production Design) (ABC); The Kelly Clarkson Show – Emily Auble (Set Decoration); James Pearse Connelly (Production Design) (Syndicated)

=== 4th, 2023 ===
The nominations for the film categories were announced on January 5, 2024, while the winners were announced on February 13, 2024.

Best Picture
Poor Things – Directed by Yorgos Lanthimos; Zsuzsa Mihalek (Set Decoration); Shona Heath and James Price (Production Design)
Best Achievement in Décor/Design of a Contemporary Feature Film	Best Achievement in Décor/Design of a Period Feature Film
Saltburn – Charlotte Dirickx (Set Decoration); Suzie Davies (Production Design); The Killer – Brandi Kalish (Set Decoration); Donald Graham Burt (Production Design); Leave the World Behind – David Schlesinger (Set Decoration); Anastasia White (Production Design); May December – Jess Royal (Set Decoration); Sam Lisenco (Production Design); Mission: Impossible – Dead Reckoning Part One – Raffaella Giovannetti (Set Decoration); Gary Freeman (Production Design)	Poor Things – Zsuzsa Mihalek (Set Decoration); Shona Heath and James Price (Production Design); Killers of the Flower Moon – Adam Willis (Set Decoration); Jack Fisk (Production Design); Maestro – Rena DeAngelo (Set Decoration); Kevin Thompson (Production Design); Napoleon – Elli Griff (Set Decoration); Arthur Max (Production Design); Oppenheimer – Claire Kaufman (Set Decoration); Ruth De Jong (Production Design)
Best Achievement in Décor/Design of a Fantasy or Science Fiction Feature Film	Best Achievement in Décor/Design of a Comedy or Musical Feature Film
Barbie – Katie Spencer (Set Decoration); Sarah Greenwood (Production Design); Guardians of the Galaxy Vol. 3 – Rosemary Brandenburg (Set Decoration); Beth Mickle (Production Design); The Hunger Games: The Ballad of Songbirds & Snakes – Sabine Schaaf (Set Decoration); Uli Hanisch (Production Design); Indiana Jones and the Dial of Destiny – Anna Pinnock (Set Decoration); Adam Stockhausen (Production Design); Wonka – Lee Sandales (Set Decoration); Nathan Crowley (Production Design)	Asteroid City – Kris Moran (Set Decoration); Adam Stockhausen (Production Design); American Fiction – Kyra Friedman Curcio (Set Decoration); Jonathan Guggenheim (Production Design); Are You There God? It's Me, Margaret. – Selina M. Van den Brink (Set Decoration); Steve Saklad (Production Design); Candy Cane Lane – Jan Pascale (Set Decoration); Aaron Osborne (Production Design); The Little Mermaid – Gordon Sim (Set Decoration); John Myhre (Production Design)

The nominations for the television categories were announced on June 10, 2024, while the winners were revealed on August 5, 2024.

Best Achievement in Décor/Design of a One Hour Contemporary Series	Best Achievement in Décor/Design of a One Hour Fantasy or Science Fiction Series
Mr. & Mrs. Smith – Andrew Baseman and Michael Nallan (Set Decoration); Gerald Sullivan (Production Design) (Prime Video); Fargo – Amber Humphries (Set Decoration); Trevor Smith (Production Design) (FX / Hulu); The Gentlemen – Linda Wilson and Amy Cooper-Goodrich (Set Decoration); Martyn John and Linda Wilson (Production Design) (Netflix); The Morning Show – Lauree Martell (Set Decoration); Nelson Coates (Production Design) (Apple TV+); True Detective: Night Country – Charlotte Dirickx (Set Decoration); Dan Taylor (Production Design) (HBO / Max)	Fallout – Regina Graves (Set Decoration); Howard Cummings (Production Design) (Prime Video); 3 Body Problem – Andrew McCarthy (Set Decoration); Deborah Riley (Production Design) (Netflix); For All Mankind – Kimberly Wannop and Laura Harper (Set Decoration); Seth Reed (Production Design) (Apple TV+); Loki – Jille Azis (Set Decoration); Kasra Farahani (Production Design) (Disney+); Silo – Amanda Bernstein (Set Decoration); Gavin Bocquet (Production Design) (Apple TV+)
Best Achievement in Décor/Design of a One Hour Period Series	Best Achievement in Décor/Design of a Television Movie or Limited Series
Palm Royale – Ellen Reede (Set Decoration); Jonathan Carlos (Production Design) (Apple TV+); The Crown – Alison Harvey, Carolyn Boult, and Sophie Coombes (Set Decoration); Martin Childs (Production Design) (Netflix); Feud: Capote vs. The Swans – Cherish M. Hale and Kathy Orlando (Set Decoration); Mark Ricker (Production Design) (FX / Hulu); The Gilded Age – Lisa Crivelli Scoppa (Set Decoration); Bob Shaw (Production Design) (HBO / Max); Shōgun – Lisa Lancaster and Jonathan Lancaster (Set Decoration); Helen Jarvis (Production Design) (FX / Hulu)	Ripley – Alessandra Querzola (Set Decoration); David Gropman (Production Design) (Netflix); All the Light We Cannot See – Zsuzsa Mihalek (Set Decoration); Simon Elliott (Production Design) (Netflix); Baby Reindeer – Hannah Evans and Lucy Haley (Set Decoration); Debbie Burton (Production Design) (Netflix); Griselda – Kimberly Leonard (Set Decoration); Knut Loewe (Production Design) (Netflix); Lessons in Chemistry – Lori Mazuer (Set Decoration); Cat Smith (Production Design) (Apple TV+)
Best Achievement in Décor/Design of a Half-Hour Single-Camera Series	Best Achievement in Décor/Design of a Half-Hour Multi-Camera Series
Hacks – Jennifer Lukehart (Set Decoration); Rob Tokarz (Production Design) (HBO / Max); Abbott Elementary – Cherie Ledwith (Set Decoration); Michael Whetstone (Production Design) (ABC); The Bear – Eric Frankel (Set Decoration); Merje Veski (Production Design) (FX / Hulu); Only Murders in the Building – Rich Murray (Set Decoration); Patrick Howe (Production Design) (FX / Hulu); What We Do in the Shadows – Kerri Wylie (Set Decoration); Shayne Fox (Production Design) (FX)	Frasier – Amy Feldman (Set Decoration); Glenda Rovello (Production Design) (Paramount+); Bob Hearts Abishola – Ann Shea (Set Decoration); Francoise Cherry-Cohen (Production Design) (CBS); The Conners – Anne H. Ahrens (Set Decoration); Jerry Dunn (Production Design) (ABC); The Neighbourhood – Ron Olsen (Set Decoration); Amy Skjonsby-Winslow (Production Design) (CBS); Night Court – Peter Gurski (Set Decoration); Steve Olson (Production Design) (NBC)
Best Achievement in Décor/Design of a Short Format: Webseries, Music Video, or Commercial	Best Achievement in Décor/Design of a Variety, Reality or Competition Series, or Special
Taylor Swift: "Fortnight" – Neil Wyzanowski (Set Decoration); Ethan Tobman (Production Design); Booking.com: "Somewhere, Anywhere, The Musical" – Ashley Campanella (Set Decoration); Florencia Martin (Production Design); Jennifer Lopez: "This Is Me... Now" – Gail Anne Otter (Set Decoration); Richard Bridgland (Production Design); Jonas Brothers: "Behind the Seen/Staar Surgical" – Keri Lederman (Set Decoration); Latisha Duarte (Production Design); Steve Madden: "The Perfect Pair" – Mariana Soares (Set Decoration); Mariana Soares (Production Design)	Dick Van Dyke: 98 Years of Magic – John Sparano (Set Decoration); Steve Mordan and James Yarnell (Production Design) (CBS); Dinner Party Diaries with José Andrés – Heidi Miller (Set Decoration); David Korins (Production Design) (Prime Video); Jimmy Kimmel Live! – Heidi Miller (Set Decoration); David Ellis (Production Design) (ABC); John Mulaney Presents: Everybody's in LA – Kelley Pearce and Raquel Tarbet (Set Decoration); Andrea Purcigliotti (Production Design) (Netflix); The Voice – Christina Limgenco and Stephanie Hines (Set Decoration); James Connelly (Production Design) (NBC)
Best Achievement in Décor/Design of a Daytime Series
The Bold and the Beautiful – Charlotte Garnell and Jerie Kelter (Set Decoration); Jack Forrestal (Production Design) (CBS); Days of Our Lives – Adele Caine (Set Decoration); Tom Early (Production Design) (Peacock); The Drew Barrymore Show – Lauren Ringer (Set Decoration); Diann Duthie (Production Design) (Syndicated); The Kelly Clarkson Show – Melissa Shakun and Brianne Demmler (Set Decoration); James Connelly (Production Design) (NBC); The Young and the Restless – Jennifer Haybach, Justine Mercado, Maria Dirolf, and Monica Lowe (Set Decoration); David Hoffman (Production Design) (CBS)

=== 5th, 2024 ===
5th Set Decorators Society of America Awards

Highlights
- Most wins: Regina Graves – A Complete Unknown (2)
- Most nominations: Grant Armstrong; Kelsey Fowler; Greg Grande (2)

The nominations for the film categories were announced on January 3, 2025, while the winners were announced on February 7, 2025, via YouTube. Originally scheduled to take place on February 2, 2025, the winner announcement for film was delayed due to the January Southern California wildfires.

Best Picture
A Complete Unknown – Directed by James Mangold; Regina Graves (Set Decoration); François Audouy (Production Design)
Best Achievement in Décor/Design of a Contemporary Feature Film	Best Achievement in Décor/Design of a Period Feature Film
Conclave – Cynthia Sleiter (Set Decoration); Suzie Davies (Production Design); Anora – Christopher Phelps (Set Decoration); Stephen Phelps (Production Design); Civil War – Lizbeth Ayala (Set Decoration); Caty Maxey (Production Design); Emilia Pérez – Cécile Deleu (Set Decoration); Emmanuelle Duplay (Production Design); The Substance – Cécilia Blom (Set Decoration); Stanislas Reydellet (Production Design)	A Complete Unknown – Regina Graves (Set Decoration); François Audouy (Production Design); The Brutalist – Patricia Cuccia and Mercédesz Nagyváradi (Set Decoration); Judy Becker (Production Design); Gladiator II – Jille Azis and Elli Griff (Set Decoration); Arthur Max (Production Design); Maria – Sandro Piccarozzi (Set Decoration); Guy Hendrix Dyas (Production Design); Nosferatu – Beatrice Brentnerová (Set Decoration); Craig Lathrop (Production Design)
Best Achievement in Décor/Design of a Fantasy or Science Fiction Film	Best Achievement in Décor/Design of a Comedy or Musical Feature Film
Beetlejuice Beetlejuice – David Morison and Lori Mazuer (Set Decoration); Mark Scruton (Production Design); Alien: Romulus – Zsuzsanna Sipos (Set Decoration); Naaman Marshall (Production Design); Dune: Part Two – Shane Vieau (Set Decoration); Patrice Vermette (Production Design); Furiosa: A Mad Max Saga – Katie Sharrock (Set Decoration); Colin Gibson (Production Design); Megalopolis – Lisa Sessions Morgan (Set Decoration); Beth Mickle and Bradley Rubin (Production Design)	Wicked – Lee Sandales (Set Decoration); Nathan Crowley (Production Design); Deadpool & Wolverine – Naomi Moore and Imogen Lee (Set Decoration); Raymond Chan (Production Design); Kinds of Kindness – Amy Silver (Set Decoration); Anthony Gasparro (Production Design); Nightbitch – Ryan Watson (Set Decoration); Karen Murphy (Production Design); Wolfs – Melissa Levander (Set Decoration); Jade Healy (Production Design)

The nominations for the television categories were announced on June 6, 2025, and the ceremony took place on August 10.

Best Achievement in Décor/Design of a One Hour Contemporary Series	Best Achievement in Décor/Design of a One Hour Fantasy or Science Fiction Series
Severance – David Schlesinger (Set Decoration); Jeremy Hindle (Production Design) (Apple TV+); Black Mirror – Ellie Shanks, Liz Ainley, Hannah Spice, Polly Davenport & Kate Marshall (Set Decoration); Miranda Jones, Cristina Casali, Helen Scott, Robin Brown & Jennifer Morden (Production Design) (Netflix); Poker Face – Cathy T. Marshall & Heather Loeffle (Set Decoration); Judy Rhee (Production Design) (Peacock); The White Lotus – Letizia Santucci (Set Decoration); Cristina Onori (Production Design) (HBO); Your Friends & Neighbors – Philippa Culpepper (Set Decoration); Anu Schwartz (Production Design) (Apple TV+)	The Last of Us – Jonathan Lancaster & Lisa Lancaster (Set Decoration); Don Macaulay (Production Design) (HBO); Andor – Rebecca Alleway (Set Decoration); Luke Hull (Production Design) (Disney+); Dune: Prophecy – Carolyn Loucks & Roxana Balogh (Set Decoration); Tom Meyer (Production Design) (HBO); House of the Dragon – Claire Nia Richards (Set Decoration); Jim Clay (Production Design) (HBO); The Lord of the Rings: The Rings of Power – Tina Jones (Set Decoration); Kristian Milsted (Production Design) (Prime Video)
Best Achievement in Décor/Design of a One Hour Period Series	Best Achievement in Décor/Design of a Television Movie or Limited Series
1923 – Carla Curry (Set Decoration); Cary White & Lisa Ward (Production Design) (Paramount+); Bridgerton – Natalie Papageorgiadis (Set Decoration); Alison Gartshore (Production Design) (Netflix); One Hundred Years of Solitude – Arley Garzón Gómez, Catalina Angulo, Rafael Withingham & Angela Benavides (Set Decoration); Barbara Enriquez & Eugenio Caballero (Production Design) (Netflix); Pachinko – Ann Victoria Smart (Set Decoration); Ruth Ammon (Production Design) (Apple TV+); Yellowjackets – Ide Foyle (Set Decoration); Margot Ready (Production Design) (Showtime)	Lady in the Lake – Karuna Karmarkar (Set Decoration); JC Molina (Production Design) (Apple TV+); The Four Seasons – Jennifer Greenberg (Set Decoration); Sharon Lomofsky (Production Design) (Netflix); Interior Chinatown – Adrienne Garcia (Set Decoration); Kate Bunch (Production Design) (Hulu); Monsters: The Lyle and Erik Menendez Story – Melissa Licht (Set Decoration); Matthew Flood Ferguson (Production Design) (Netflix); Sirens – Rich Murray (Set Decoration); John Paino (Production Design) (Netflix)
Best Achievement in Décor/Design of a Half-Hour Single-Camera Series	Best Achievement in Décor/Design of a Half-Hour Multi-Camera Series
The Studio – Claire Kaufman (Set Decoration); Julie Berghoff (Production Design) (Apple TV+); Hacks – Jennifer Lukehart (Set Decoration); Rob Tokarz (Production Design) (HBO Max); The Righteous Gemstones – Patrick Cassidy (Set Decoration); Richard A. Wright (Production Design) (HBO); Only Murders in the Building – Mila Khalevich (Set Decoration); Patrick Howe (Production Design) (Hulu); What We Do in the Shadows – Kerri Wylie (Set Decoration); Shayne Fox (Production Design) (FX)	Mid-Century Modern – Peter Gurski (Set Decoration); Greg Grande (Production Design) (Hulu); The Conners – Anne H. Ahrens (Set Decoration); Jerry Dunn (Production Design) (ABC); Frasier – Amy Feldman (Set Decoration); Glenda Rovello (Production Design) (Paramount+); The Neighborhood – Ron Olsen (Set Decoration); Amy Skjonsby-Winslow (Production Design) (CBS); That '90s Show – Tara Stephenson-Fong (Set Decoration); Greg Grande (Production Design) (Netflix)
Best Achievement in Décor/Design of a Short Format: Webseries, Music Video, or Commercial	Best Achievement in Décor/Design of a Variety, Reality or Competition, or Special
Sabrina Carpenter: "Taste" – Kelsey Fowler (Set Decoration); Grant Armstrong (Production Design); Dr. Pepper: "Into the Great Unknown – Fanville Season 7" – Traci Spadorcia (Set Decoration); Mark Snelgrove (Production Design); Jelly Roll: "Dead End Road" from Twisters (Official Music Video) – Effney Gardea (Set Decoration); Elizabet Puksto (Production Design); Snoop Dogg and Dr. Dre: "Missionary" – Kelsey Fowler (Set Decoration); Grant Armstrong (Production Design); Taco Bell: "Caliente Cantina Chicken Menu" – Gabrielle Rosenberg (Set Decoration); Gabrielle Rosenberg (Production Design)	Saturday Night Live – Kimberly Kachougian, Danielle Webb, Sara Parks, Kimberly Fischer & Jessica Templin King (Set Decoration); Andrea Purcigliotti, Kenneth MacLeod & Mark Newell (Production Design) (NBC); Hell's Kitchen: Head Chefs Only – Sarah Sprawls & Skye Landon (Set Decoration); John Janavs (Production Design) (Fox); Jimmy Kimmel Live! – Heidi Miller (Set Decoration); David Ellis (Production Design) (ABC); A Nonsense Christmas with Sabrina Carpenter – John Sparano (Set Decoration); Jason Sherwood (Production Design) (Netflix); The Voice – Stephanie Hines (Set Decoration); James Connelly (Production Design) (NBC)
Best Achievement in Décor/Design of a Daytime Series
The Young and the Restless – Jennifer Haybach, Justine Mercado, Maria Dirolf & Monica Lowe (Set Decoration); David Hoffmann (Production Design) (CBS); Beyond the Gates – Cynthia Slagter (Set Decoration); Bruton Jones (Production Design) (CBS); The Bold and the Beautiful – Charlotte Garnell, Jerie Kelter & Chelsea Mondelli (Set Decoration); Jack Forrestel (Production Design) (CBS); Days of Our Lives – Adele Caine (Set Decoration); Tom Early (Production Design) (Peacock); General Hospital – Jennifer Elliot (Set Decoration); Andrew Evashchen (Production Design) (ABC)

=== 6th, 2025 ===
6th Set Decorators Society of America Awards

Highlights
- Most wins: Anthony Carlino; Florencia Martin (2)
- Most nominations: Anthony Carlino; Nelson Coates; Alex DiGerlando; Lydia Marks; Véronique Melery; Denise Pizzini; Mark Tildesley (2)

The nominations for the film categories were announced on January 5, 2026. Set decorator Véronique Melery and production designer Mark Tildesley were the only individuals to have received multiple nominations for film, with two each, both for the contemporary feature film category. The winners were announced on February 21, 2026.

Best Picture
One Battle After Another – Directed by Paul Thomas Anderson; Anthony Carlino (Set Decoration); Florencia Martin (Production Design)
Best Achievement in Décor/Design of a Contemporary Feature Film	Best Achievement in Décor/Design of a Period Feature Film
One Battle After Another – Anthony Carlino (Set Decoration); Florencia Martin (Production Design); Bugonia – Prue Howard (Set Decoration); James Price (Production Design); F1 – Andrew McCarthy and Véronique Melery (Set Decoration); Mark Tildesley and Ben Munro (Production Design); Jay Kelly – Véronique Melery and Meg Everist (Set Decoration); Mark Tildesley (Production Design); Wake Up Dead Man: A Knives Out Mystery – Kathryn Pyle (Set Decoration); Rick Heinrichs (Production Design)	Hamnet – Alice Felton (Set Decoration); Fiona Crombie (Production Design); Downton Abbey: The Grand Finale – Linda Wilson (Set Decoration); Donal Woods (Production Design); Marty Supreme – Adam Willis (Set Decoration); Jack Fisk (Production Design); Sinners – Monique Champagne (Set Decoration); Hannah Beachler (Production Design); Springsteen: Deliver Me from Nowhere – Kris Moran (Set Decoration); Stefania Cella (Production Design)
Best Achievement in Décor/Design of a Fantasy or Science Fiction Film	Best Achievement in Décor/Design of a Comedy or Musical Feature Film
Frankenstein – Shane Vieau (Set Decoration); Tamara Deverell (Production Design); Avatar: Fire and Ash – Vanessa Cole (Set Decoration); Dylan Cole and Ben Procter (Production Design); The Fantastic Four: First Steps – Jille Azis (Set Decoration); Kasra Farahani (Production Design); How to Train Your Dragon – Daniel Birt (Set Decoration); Dominic Watkins (Production Design); Superman – Rosemary Brandenburg (Set Decoration); Beth Mickle (Production Design)	Wicked: For Good – Lee Sandales (Set Decoration); Nathan Crowley (Production Design); Freakier Friday – Brandi Kalish (Set Decoration); Kay Anna Lee (Production Design); Kiss of the Spider Woman – Andrew Baseman (Set Decoration); Scott Chambliss (Production Design); The Phoenician Scheme – Anna Pinnock (Set Decoration); Adam Stockhausen (Production Design); Roofman – Kendall Anderson (Set Decoration); Inbal Weinberg (Production Design)

The nominations for the television categories were announced on June 5, 2026, while the winners were revealed on August 9. "The qualifying productions are those with an air date during the period of June 1, 2025 to May 31, 2026."

Best Achievement in Décor/Design of a One Hour Contemporary Series	Best Achievement in Décor/Design of a One Hour Fantasy or Science Fiction Series
Widow's Bay – Jennifer Engel (Set Decoration); Steve Arnold (Production Design) (Apple TV); Euphoria – Anthony Carlino (Set Decoration); François Audouy (Production Design) (HBO); Margo's Got Money Troubles – Linette McCown (Set Decoration); Richard Bloom (Production Design) (Apple TV); The Morning Show – Carolyn Loucks (Set Decoration); Nelson Coates (Production Design) (Apple TV); Pluribus – Ashley Michelle Marsh (Set Decoration); Denise Pizzini (Production Design) (Apple TV)	Fallout – Julie Ochipinti (Set Decoration); Howard Cummings (Production Design) (Prime Video) (TIE); Wednesday – David Morison and Neville Gaynor (Set Decoration); Mark Scruton and Philip Murphy (Production Design) (Netflix) (TIE); The Boys – Rosalie Board (Set Decoration); Jeff Mossa (Production Design) (Prime Video); For All Mankind – Lisa Clark (Set Decoration); Seth Reed (Production Design) (Apple TV); Stranger Things – Jess Royal (Set Decoration); Chris Trujillo (Production Design) (Netflix)
Best Achievement in Décor/Design of a One Hour Period Series	Best Achievement in Décor/Design of a Television Movie or Limited Series
Palm Royale – Ellen Reede (Set Decoration); Jon Carlos (Production Design) (Apple TV); Bridgerton – Natalie Papageorgiadis (Set Decoration); Alison Gartshore (Production Design) (Netflix); Outlander – Stuart Bryce (Set Decoration); Mike Gunn (Production Design) (Starz); Spider-Noir – Halina Siwolop (Set Decoration); Warren Alan Young (Production Design) (Prime Video); Young Sherlock – Barbara Herman-Skelding (Set Decoration); Tom Burton (Production Design) (Prime Video)	Beef – Kellie Jo Tinney (Set Decoration); Grace Yun (Production Design) (Netflix); The Beast in Me – Michael Nallan (Set Decoration); Loren Weeks (Production Design) (Netflix); Black Rabbit – Lydia Marks (Set Decoration); Alex DiGerlando (Production Design) (Netflix); Love Story – Lydia Marks (Set Decoration); Alex DiGerlando (Production Design) (FX / FX on Hulu); Monster: The Ed Gein Story – Melissa Licht (Set Decoration); Matthew Flood (Production Design) (Netflix)
Best Achievement in Décor/Design of a Half-Hour Single-Camera Series	Best Achievement in Décor/Design of a Half-Hour Multi-Camera Series
Hacks – Jennifer Lukehart (Set Decoration); Rob Tokarz (Production Design) (HBO Max); Emily in Paris – Alexandra Lassen (Set Decoration); Anne Seibel (Production Design) (Netflix); Nobody Wants This – Michael Voelker (Set Decoration); Claire Bennett (Production Design) (Netflix); Only Murders in the Building – Mila Khalevich (Set Decoration); Patrick Howe (Production Design) (Hulu); Shrinking – Andrea Fenton (Set Decoration); Cabot McMullen (Production Design) (Apple TV)	Happy's Place – Amy Feldman (Set Decoration); Glenda Rovello (Production Design) (NBC); Georgie & Mandy's First Marriage – Richard C. Walker (Set Decoration); Joseph P. Lucky (Production Design) (CBS); Leanne – Ann Shea (Set Decoration); Francoise Cherry-Cohen (Production Design) (Netflix); The Neighborhood – Ron Olsen (Set Decoration); Amy Skjonsby-Winslow (Production Design) (CBS); Wizards Beyond Waverly Place – Emily Dawson-Trent and Roya Parivar (Set Decoration); Kelly Hogan (Production Design) (Disney Channel)
Best Achievement in Décor/Design of a Short Format: Webseries, Music Video, or Commercial	Best Achievement in Décor/Design of a Variety, Reality or Competition Series, or Special
Offset & John Legend: "Never Let Go" (Official Video) – Effney Gardea (Set Decoration); Elizabet Puksto (Production Design); Campari Stay Bitter: "Sarah Michelle Gellar" – Gabrielle Rosenberg (Set Decoration and Production Design); Grease: "Sleigh Ridin'" – Keri Lederman (Set Decoration); David Skinner (Production Design); Sabrina Carpenter: "Tears" – Lila Yanow (Set Decoration); Brittany Porter (Production Design); Target: "Step Into the Holidays" – Shauna Aronson (Set Decoration); Nelson Coates (Production Design)	The Muppet Show – Bethany Barton (Set Decoration); Denise Pizzini (Production Design) (ABC / Disney+); The First Snow of Fraggle Rock – Ian Nothnagel and Amber Humphries (Set Decoration); Pedro Romero (Production Design) (Apple TV); Jimmy Kimmel Live! – Heidi Miller (Set Decoration); David Ellis (Production Design) (ABC); Saturday Night Live – Kimberly Kachougian, Danielle Webb, Sara Parks, and Jessica Templin-King (Set Decoration); Andrea Purcigliotti and Kenneth Macleod (Production Design) (NBC); Wicked: One Wonderful Night – Nia Freshman (Set Decoration); Misty Buckley (Production Design) (NBC)
Best Achievement in Décor/Design of a Daytime Series
The Bold and the Beautiful – Prim Rosales, Beth Wooke, Prerna Chawla, Charlotte Garnell, Chelsea Mondelli, Michelle Hall, and Linda Louise Sheets (Set Decoration); Lou A. Trabbie III (Production Design) (CBS); Beyond the Gates – Cynthia Slagter (Set Decoration); Bruton Jones (Production Design) (CBS); Days of Our Lives – Adele Caine and Sarah Holmes (Set Decoration); Tom Early and Dan Olexiewicz (Production Design) (Peacock); General Hospital – Jennifer Elliott (Set Decoration); Andrew Evashchen (Production Design) (ABC); The Young and the Restless – Jennifer Haybach, Justine Mercado, Maria Dirolf, and Monica Lowe (Set Decoration); David Hoffmann (Production Design) (CBS)
