= Critics' Choice Movie Award for Best Production Design =

Award given by the Critics Choice Association

The Critics' Choice Movie Award for Best Production Design (previously known as the Critics' Choice Award for Best Art Direction) is one of the Critics' Choice Movie Awards given to people working in the film industry by the Critics Choice Association. It was first given out as a juried award in 2001 and then competitively in 2010 onward.

== Winners and nominees ==
=== 2000s ===
Year	Film	Production designer(s)	Ref.
2000	Gladiator	Arthur Max	
2009	Avatar	Rick Carter, Kim Sinclair, and Robert Stromberg	
2009	Inglourious Basterds	David Wasco and Sandy Reynolds-Wasco	
2009	The Lovely Bones	George DeTitta Jr. and Naomi Shohan	
2009	Nine	John Myhre and Gordon Sim	
2009	A Single Man	Dan Bishop	

=== 2010s ===
Year	Film	Production designer(s)	Ref.
2010	Inception	Larry Dias, Guy Hendrix Dyas, and Doug Mowat	
2010	Alice in Wonderland	Karen O'Hara and Robert Stromberg	
2010	Black Swan	Thérèse DePrez and Tora Peterson	
2010	The King's Speech	Judy Farr and Eve Stewart	
2010	True Grit	Jess Gonchor and Nancy Haigh	
2011	Hugo	Dante Ferretti and Francesca Lo Schiavo	
2011	The Artist	Laurence Bennett and Gregory S. Hooper	
2011	Harry Potter and the Deathly Hallows – Part 2	Stuart Craig and Stephenie McMillan	
2011	The Tree of Life	David Crank and Jack Fisk	
2011	War Horse	Rick Carter and Lee Sandales	
2012	Anna Karenina	Sarah Greenwood and Katie Spencer	
2012	The Hobbit: An Unexpected Journey	Simon Bright, Dan Hennah, and Ra Vincent	
2012	Les Misérables	Anna Lynch-Robinson and Eve Stewart	
2012	Life of Pi	David Gropman and Anna Pinnock	
2012	Lincoln	Rick Carter and Jim Erickson	
2013	The Great Gatsby	Beverley Dunn and Catherine Martin	
2013	12 Years a Slave	Alice Baker and Adam Stockhausen	
2013	Gravity	Rosie Goodwin and Andy Nicholson	
2013	Her	K. K. Barrett and Gene Serdena	
2013	The Hobbit: The Desolation of Smaug	Dan Hennah and Ra Vincent	
2014	The Grand Budapest Hotel	Anna Pinnock and Adam Stockhausen	
2014	Birdman	George DeTitta Jr. and Kevin Thompson	
2014	Inherent Vice	David Crank and Amy Wells	
2014	Interstellar	Nathan Crowley and Gary Fettis	
2014	Into the Woods	Dennis Gassner and Anna Pinnock	
2014	Snowpiercer	Beatrice Brentnerová and Ondřej Nekvasil	
2015	Mad Max: Fury Road	Colin Gibson	
2015	Bridge of Spies	Rena DeAngelo and Adam Stockhausen	
2015	Brooklyn	Jenny Oman, François Séguin, and Louise Tremblay	
2015	Carol	Judy Becker and Heather Loeffler	
2015	The Danish Girl	Michael Standish and Eve Stewart	
2015	The Martian	Celia Bobak and Arthur Max	
2016	La La Land	David Wasco and Sandy Reynolds-Wasco	
2016	Arrival	Paul Hotte, André Valade, and Patrice Vermette	
2016	Fantastic Beasts and Where to Find Them	Stuart Craig, James Hambidge, and Anna Pinnock	
2016	Jackie	Véronique Melery and Jean Rabasse	
2016	Live by Night	Jess Gonchor and Nancy Haigh	
2017	The Shape of Water	Paul Denham Austerberry, Jeff Melvin, and Shane Vieau	
2017	Beauty and the Beast	Sarah Greenwood and Katie Spencer	
2017	Blade Runner 2049	Dennis Gassner and Alessandra Querzola	
2017	Dunkirk	Nathan Crowley and Gary Fettis	
2017	Murder on the Orient Express	Rebecca Alleway and Jim Clay	
2017	Phantom Thread	Véronique Melery and Mark Tildesley	
2018	Black Panther	Hannah Beachler and Jay Hart	
2018	Crazy Rich Asians	Andrew Baseman and Nelson Coates	
2018	The Favourite	Fiona Crombie and Alice Felton	
2018	First Man	Nathan Crowley and Kathy Lucas	
2018	Mary Poppins Returns	John Myhre and Gordon Sim	
2018	Roma	Eugenio Caballero and Bárbara Enríquez	
2019	Once Upon a Time in Hollywood	Nancy Haigh and Barbara Ling	
2019	1917	Dennis Gassner and Lee Sandales	
2019	Downton Abbey	Gina Cromwell and Donal Woods	
2019	The Irishman	Regina Graves and Bob Shaw	
2019	Joker	Mark Friedberg and Kris Moran	
2019	Little Women	Jess Gonchor and Claire Kaufman	
2019	Parasite	Lee Ha-jun	

=== 2020s ===
Year	Film	Production designer(s)	Ref.
2020	Mank	Donald Graham Burt and Jan Pascale	
2020	Emma	Stella Fox and Kave Quinn	
2020	Ma Rainey's Black Bottom	Karen O'Hara, Mark Ricker, and Diana Stoughton	
2020	News of the World	David Crank and Elizabeth Keenan	
2020	The Personal History of David Copperfield	Cristina Casali and Charlotte Dirickx	
2020	Tenet	Nathan Crowley and Kathy Lucas	
2021	Dune	Zsuzsanna Sipos and Patrice Vermette	
2021	Belfast	Jim Clay and Claire Nia Richards	
2021	The French Dispatch	Rena DeAngelo and Adam Stockhausen	
2021	Nightmare Alley	Tamara Deverell and Shane Vieau	
2021	West Side Story	Rena DeAngelo and Adam Stockhausen	
2022	Babylon	Florencia Martin and Anthony Carlino	
2022	Avatar: The Way of Water	Dylan Cole, Ben Procter, and Vanessa Cole	
2022	Black Panther: Wakanda Forever	Hannah Beachler and Lisa K. Sessions	
2022	Elvis	Catherine Martin, Karen Murphy, and Bev Dunn	
2022	Everything Everywhere All at Once	Jason Kisvarday and Kelsi Ephraim	
2022	The Fabelmans	Rick Carter and Karen O'Hara	
2023	Barbie	Sarah Greenwood and Katie Spencer	
2023	Asteroid City	Adam Stockhausen and Kris Moran	
2023	Killers of the Flower Moon	Jack Fisk and Adam Willis	
2023	Oppenheimer	Ruth De Jong and Claire Kaufman	
2023	Poor Things	James Price, Shona Heath, and Zsuzsa Mihalek	
2023	Saltburn	Suzie Davies and Charlotte Dirickx	
2024	Wicked	Nathan Crowley and Lee Sandales	
2024	The Brutalist	Judy Becker and Patricia Cuccia	
2024	Conclave	Suzie Davies	
2024	Dune: Part Two	Patrice Vermette and Shane Vieau	
2024	Gladiator II	Arthur Max, Jille Azis, and Elli Griff	
2024	Nosferatu	Craig Lathrop	
2025	Frankenstein	Tamara Deverell and Shane Vieau	
2025	The Fantastic Four: First Steps	Kasra Farahani and Jille Azis	
2025	Hamnet	Fiona Crombie and Alice Felton	
2025	Marty Supreme	Jack Fisk and Adam Willis	
2025	Sinners	Hannah Beachler and Monique Champagne	
2025	Wicked: For Good	Nathan Crowley and Lee Sandales	
