= Washington D.C. Area Film Critics Association Award for Best Art Direction =

Annual US film award

The Washington D.C. Area Film Critics Association Award for Best Art Direction is an annual award given by the Washington D.C. Area Film Critics Association.

== Winners and nominees ==
=== 2000s ===
Year	Film	Winner(s)
2005	The Chronicles of Narnia: The Lion, the Witch, and the Wardrobe	
2005	Charlie and the Chocolate Factory	
2005	Harry Potter and the Goblet of Fire	
2005	Memoirs of a Geisha	
2005	Star Wars: Episode III – Revenge of the Sith	
2006	Marie Antoinette	Anne Seibel (supervising art director)
2007	Sweeney Todd: The Demon Barber of Fleet Street	
2008	The Curious Case of Benjamin Button	
2009	Nine	
2009	Lovely Bones	
2009	Star Trek	
2009	Where the Wild Things Are	
2009	The Young Victoria	

=== 2010s ===
Year	Film	Winner(s) and nominees
2010	Inception	
2010	Alice in Wonderland	
2010	Black Swan	
2010	Harry Potter and the Deathly Hallows – Part 1	
2010	True Grit	
2011	Hugo	Dante Ferretti (production design), Francesca Lo Schiavo (set decorator)
2011	The Artist	Laurence Bennett (production designer), Gregory S. Hooper (set decorator)
2011	Harry Potter and the Deathly Hallows – Part 2	Stuart Craig (production designer), Stephenie McMillan (art director)
2011	The Tree of Life	Jack Fisk (production designer), Jeanette Scott (set decorator)
2011	War Horse	Rick Carter (production designer), Lee Sandales (set decorator)
2012	Cloud Atlas	Uli Hanisch and Hugh Bateup (production designers); Rebecca Alleway and Peter Walpole (set decorators)
2012	Anna Karenina	Sarah Greenwood (production designer), Katie Spencer (set decorator)
2012	Les Misérables	Eve Stewart (production designer), Anna Lynch-Robinson (set decorator)
2012	Lincoln	Rick Carter (production designer), Jim Erickson (set decorator)
2012	Moonrise Kingdom	Adam Stockhausen (production designer), Kris Moran (set decorator)
2013	The Great Gatsby	Catherine Martin (production designer), Beverley Dunn (set decorator)
2013	12 Years a Slave	Adam Stockhausen (production designer), Alice Baker (set decorator)
2013	Gravity	Andy Nicholson (production designer), Rosie Goodwin (set decorator)
2013	Her	K. K. Barrett (production designer), Gene Serdena (set decorator)
2013	Inside Llewyn Davis	Jess Gonchor (production designer), Susan Bode (set decorator)
2014	The Grand Budapest Hotel	Adam Stockhausen (production designer), Anna Pinnock (set decorator)
2014	Birdman or (The Unexpected Virtue of Ignorance)	Kevin Thompson (production designer), George DeTitta, Jr. (set decorator)
2014	Interstellar	Nathan Crowley (production designer), Gary Fettis (set decorator)
2014	Into the Woods	Dennis Gassner (production designer), Anna Pinnock (set decorator)
2014	Snowpiercer	Ondrej Nekvasil (production designer), Beatrice Brentnerova (set decorator)
2015	Mad Max: Fury Road	Colin Gibson (production designer), Lisa Thompson (set decorator)
2015	Brooklyn	François Séguin (production designer); Jennifer Oman and Louise Tremblay (set decorators)
2015	Carol	Judy Becker (production designer), Heather Loeffler (set decorator)
2015	Cinderella	Dante Ferretti (production designer), Francesca Lo Schiavo (set decorator)
2015	Crimson Peak	Thomas Sanders (production designer); Jeff Melvin and Shane Vieau (set decorators)
2016	La La Land	David Wasco (production designer), Sandy Reynolds-Wasco (set decorator)
2016	Arrival	Patrice Vermette (production designer), Paul Hotte (set decorator)
2016	Fantastic Beasts and Where to Find Them	Stuart Craig (production designer), Anna Pinnock (set decorator)
2016	Jackie	Jean Rabasse (production designer), Véronique Melery (set decorator)
2016	The Witch	Craig Lathrop
2017	Blade Runner 2049	Dennis Gassner (production designer), Alessandra Querzola (set decorator)
2017	Beauty and the Beast	Sarah Greenwood (production designer), Katie Spencer (set decorator)
2017	Dunkirk	Nathan Crowley (production designer), Gary Fettis (set decorator)
2017	The Shape of Water	Paul Denham Austerberry (production designer); Jeff Melvin and Shane Vieau (set decorators)
2017	Wonder Woman	Aline Bonetto (production designer), Anna Lynch-Robinson (set decorator)
2018	Black Panther	Hannah Beachler (production designer), Jay Hart (set decorator)
2018	The Favourite	Fiona Crombie (production designer), Alice Felton (set decorator)
2018	First Man	Nathan Crowley (production designer), Kathy Lucas (set decorator)
2018	Mary Poppins Returns	John Myhre (production designer), Gordon Sim (set decorator)
2018	Roma	Eugenio Caballero (production designer), Bárbara Enríquez (set decorator)
2019	Once Upon a Time...in Hollywood	Barbara Ling (production design) and Nancy Haigh (set decorator)
2019	1917	Dennis Gassner (production design) and Lee Sandales (set decorator)
2019	Jojo Rabbit	Ra Vincent (production design) and Nora Sopková (set decorator)
2019	Little Women	Jess Gonchor (production design) and Claire Kaufman (set decorator)
2019	Parasite	Lee Ha-jun (production design) and Cho Won-woo (set decorator)

=== 2020s ===
Year	Film	Winner(s) and nominees
2020	Mank	Donald Graham Burt (production design) and Jan Pascale (set decoration)
2020	News of the World	David Crank (production design) and Elizabeth Keenan (set decoration)
2020	Tenet	Nathan Crowley (production design) and Kathy Lucas (set decoration)
2020	Emma	Kave Quinn (production design) and Stella Fox (set decoration)
2020	Ma Rainey's Black Bottom	Mark Ricker (production design) and Karen O'Hara (set decoration)
2021	Dune	Patrice Vermette (production designer); Richard Roberts and Zsuzsanna Sipos (set decorators)
2021	Belfast	Jim Clay (production designer); Claire Nia Richards (set decorator)
2021	The French Dispatch	Adam Stockhausen (production designer); Rena DeAngelo (set decorator)
2021	Nightmare Alley	Tamara Deverell (production designer); Shane Vieau (set decorator)
2021	West Side Story	Adam Stockhausen (production designer); Rena DeAngelo (set decorator)
2022	Black Panther: Wakanda Forever	Hannah Beachler (production designer), Lisa Sessions Morgan (set decorator)
2022	Elvis	Catherine Martin and Karen Murphy (production designers); Bev Dunn (set decorator)
2022	Everything Everywhere All at Once	Jason Kisvarday (production designer); Kelsi Ephraim (set decorator)
2022	The Fablemans	Rick Carter (production designer); Karen O'Hara (set decorator)
2022	Glass Onion: A Knives Out Mystery	Rick Heinrichs (production designer); Elli Griff (set decorator)
2023	Barbie	Sarah Greenwood (production designer), Katie Spencer (set decorator)
2023	Asteroid City	Adam Stockhausen (production designer); Kris Moran (set decorator)
2023	Killers of the Flower Moon	Jack Fisk (production designer); Adam Willis (set decorator)
2023	Oppenheimer	Ruth De Jong (production designer); Claire Kaufman (set decorator)
2023	Poor Things	Shona Heath and James Price (production designers); Zsuzsa Mihalek (set decorator)
2024	Wicked	Nathan Crowley and Lee Sandales
2024	The Brutalist	Judy Becker
2024	Dune: Part Two	Patrice Vermette and Shane Vieau
2024	Gladiator II	Arthur Max
2024	Nosferatu	Craig Lathrop and Beatrice Brentnerova
