= Set Decorators Society of America Award for Best Achievement in Decor/Design of a Comedy or Musical Feature Film =

The Set Decorators Society of America Award for Best Achievement in Decor/Design of a Comedy or Musical Feature Film is an annual award given by the Set Decorators Society of America. It honors the work set decorators whose work has been deemed the "best" of a given year, in the genres of comedy and/or musical film. It was first awarded in 2021.

== Winners and nominees ==
=== 2020s ===
Year	Film	Production Designer(s)
2020 (1st)	The Prom	Gene Serdena (Set Decoration); Jamie Walker McCall (Production Design)
2020 (1st)	Borat Subsequent Moviefilm	Alina Pentac (Set Decoration); David Saenz de Maturana (Production Design)
2020 (1st)	Dolittle	Lee Sandales (Set Decoration); Dominic Watkins (Production Design)
2020 (1st)	Eurovision Song Contest: The Story of Fire Saga	Naomi Moore (Set Decoration); Paul Inglis (Production Design)
2020 (1st)	The King of Staten Island	David Schlesinger (Set Decoration); Kevin Thompson (Production Design)
2021 (2nd)	The French Dispatch	Rena DeAngelo (Set Decoration); Adam Stockhausen (Production Design)
2021 (2nd)	Cruella	Alice Felton (Set Decoration); Fiona Crombie (Production Design)
2021 (2nd)	Cyrano	Katie Spencer (Set Decoration); Sarah Greenwood (Production Design)
2021 (2nd)	tick, tick... BOOM!	Lydia Marks (Set Decoration); Alex DiGerlando (Production Design)
2021 (2nd)	West Side Story	Rena DeAngelo (Set Decoration); Adam Stockhausen (Production Design)
2022 (3rd)	Roald Dahl's Matilda the Musical	Anna Lynch-Robinson (Set Decoration); David Hindle and Christian Huband (Production Design)
2022 (3rd)	The Unbearable Weight of Massive Talent	Letizia Santucci (Set Decoration); Kevin Kavanaugh (Production Design)
2022 (3rd)	Bros	Nicki Ritchie (Set Decoration); Lisa Myers (Production Design)
2022 (3rd)	Lyle, Lyle, Crocodile	Kathy Orlando (Set Decoration); Mark Worthington (Production Design)
2022 (3rd)	Spirited	Lori Mazeur (Set Decoration); Clayton Hartley (Production Design)
2023 (4th)	Asteroid City	Kris Moran (Set Decoration); Adam Stockhausen (Production Design)
2023 (4th)	American Fiction	Kyra Friedman Curcio (Set Decoration); Jonathan Guggenheim (Production Design)
2023 (4th)	Are You There God? It's Me, Margaret.	Selina Van den Brink (Set Decoration); Steve Saklad (Production Design)
2023 (4th)	Candy Cane Lane	Jan Pascale (Set Decoration); Aaron Osborne (Production Design)
2023 (4th)	The Little Mermaid	Gordon Sim (Set Decoration); John Myhre (Production Design)
2024 (5th)	Wicked	Lee Sandales (Set Decoration); Nathan Crowley (Production Design)
2024 (5th)	Deadpool & Wolverine	Naomi Moore and Imogen Lee (Set Decoration); Raymond Chan (Production Design)
2024 (5th)	Kinds of Kindness	Amy Silver (Set Decoration); Anthony Gasparro (Production Design)
2024 (5th)	Nightbitch	Ryan Watson (Set Decoration); Karen Murphy (Production Design)
2024 (5th)	Wolfs	Melissa Levander (Set Decoration); Jade Healy (Production Design)
