= Set Decorators Society of America Award for Best Achievement in Decor/Design of a Science Fiction or Fantasy Feature Film =

The Set Decorators Society of America Award for Best Achievement in Decor/Design of a Science Fiction or Fantasy Feature Film is an annual award given by the Set Decorators Society of America. It honors the work set decorators whose work has been deemed the "best" of a given year, in the genres of science fiction and fantasy film. It was first awarded in 2021.

== Winners and nominees ==
=== 2020s ===
Year	Film	Production Designer(s)
2020 (1st)	Tenet	Kathy Lucas (Set Decoration); Nathan Crowley (Production Design)
2020 (1st)	The Midnight Sky	John Bush (Set Decoration); Jim Bissell (Production Design)
2020 (1st)	Palm Springs	Kelsi Ephraim (Set Decoration); Jason Kisvarday (Production Design)
2020 (1st)	The Witches	Rafaella Giovannetti (Set Decoration); Gary Freeman (Production Design)
2020 (1st)	Wonder Woman 1984	Anna Lynch-Robinson (Set Decoration); Aline Bonetto (Production Design)
2021 (2nd)	Dune	Zsuzsanna Sipos (Set Decoration); Patrice Vermette (Production Design)
2021 (2nd)	The King's Man	Dominic Capon (Set Decoration); Darren Gilford (Production Design)
2021 (2nd)	The Matrix Resurrections	Lisa Brennan, Barbara Munch (Set Decoration); Hugh Bateup, Peter Walpole (Production Design)
2021 (2nd)	Spider-Man: No Way Home	Rosemary Brandenburg (Set Decoration); Darren Gilford (Production Design)
2021 (2nd)	The Tragedy of Macbeth	Nancy Haigh (Set Decoration); Stefan Dechant (Production Design)
2022 (3rd)	Everything Everywhere All at Once	Kelsi Ephraim (Set Decoration); Jason Kisvarday (Production Design)
2022 (3rd)	Avatar: The Way of Water	Vanessa Cole (Set Decoration); Dylan Cole and Ben Procter (Production Design)
2022 (3rd)	The Batman	Lee Sandales (Set Decoration); James Chinlund (Production Design)
2022 (3rd)	Black Panther: Wakanda Forever	Lisa Sessions Morgan (Set Decoration); Hannah Beachler (Production Design)
2022 (3rd)	Don't Worry Darling	Rachel Ferrara (Set Decoration); Katie Byron (Production Design)
2023 (4th)	Barbie	Katie Spencer (Set Decoration); Sarah Greenwood (Production Design)
2023 (4th)	Guardians of the Galaxy Vol. 3	Rosemary Brandenburg (Set Decoration); Beth Mickle (Production Design)
2023 (4th)	The Hunger Games: The Ballad of Songbirds & Snakes	Sabine Schaaf (Set Decoration); Uli Hanisch (Production Design)
2023 (4th)	Indiana Jones and the Dial of Destiny	Anna Pinnock (Set Decoration); Adam Stockhausen (Production Design)
2023 (4th)	Wonka	Lee Sandales (Set Decoration); Nathan Crowley (Production Design)
2024 (5th)	Beetlejuice Beetlejuice	David Morison and Lori Mazuer (Set Decoration); Mark Scruton (Production Design)
2024 (5th)	Alien: Romulus	Zsuzsanna Sipos (Set Decoration); Naaman Marshall (Production Design)
2024 (5th)	Dune: Part Two	Shane Vieau (Set Decoration); Patrice Vermette (Production Design)
2024 (5th)	Furiosa: A Mad Max Saga	Katie Sharrock (Set Decoration); Colin Gibson (Production Design)
2024 (5th)	Megalopolis	Lisa Sessions Morgan (Set Decoration); Beth Mickle and Bradley Rubin (Production Design)
