= Set Decorators Society of America Award for Best Achievement in Decor/Design of a Period Feature Film =

The Set Decorators Society of America Award for Best Achievement in Decor/Design of a Period Feature Film is an annual award given by the Set Decorators Society of America. It honors the work set decorators whose work has been deemed the "best" of a given year, in the genre of period film. It was first awarded in 2021.

== Winners and nominees ==
=== 2020s ===
Year	Film	Production Designer(s)
2020 (1st)	Mank	Jan Pascale (Set Decoration); Donald Graham Burt (Production Design)
2020 (1st)	Emma	Stella Fox (Set Decoration); Kave Quinn (Production Design)
2020 (1st)	Ma Rainey's Black Bottom	Karen O'Hara, Diana Stoughton (Set Decoration); Mark Ricker (Production Design)
2020 (1st)	News of the World	Elizabeth Keenan (Set Decoration); David Crank (Production Design)
2020 (1st)	The Trial of the Chicago 7	Andrew Baseman (Set Decoration); Shane Valentino (Production Design)
2021 (2nd)	Being the Ricardos	Ellen Brill (Set Decoration); Jon Hutman (Production Design)
2021 (2nd)	House of Gucci	Letizia Santucci (Set Decoration); Arthur Max (Production Design)
2021 (2nd)	Licorice Pizza	Ryan Watson (Set Decoration); Florencia Martin (Production Design)
2021 (2nd)	Nightmare Alley	Shane Vieau (Set Decoration); Tamara Deverell (Production Design)
2021 (2nd)	The Power of the Dog	Amber Richards (Set Decoration); Grant Major (Production Design)
2022 (3rd)	Elvis	Bev Dunn (Set Decoration); Catherine Martin and Karen Murphy (Production Design)
2022 (3rd)	Amsterdam	Patricia Cuccia (Set Decoration); Judy Becker (Production Design)
2022 (3rd)	Babylon	Anthony Carlino (Set Decoration); Florencia Martin (Production Design)
2022 (3rd)	The Fabelmans	Karen O'Hara (Set Decoration); Rick Carter (Production Design)
2022 (3rd)	White Noise	Claire Kaufman (Set Decoration); Jess Gonchor (Production Design)
2023 (4th)	Poor Things	Zsuzsa Mihalek (Set Decoration); Shona Heath & James Price (Production Design)
2023 (4th)	Killers of the Flower Moon	Adam Willis (Set Decoration); Jack Fisk (Production Design)
2023 (4th)	Maestro	Rena DeAngelo (Set Decoration); Kevin Thompson (Production Design)
2023 (4th)	Napoleon	Elli Griff (Set Decoration); Arthur Max (Production Design)
2023 (4th)	Oppenheimer	Claire Kaufman (Set Decoration); Ruth De Jong (Production Design)
2024 (5th)	A Complete Unknown	Regina Graves (Set Decoration); François Audouy (Production Design)
2024 (5th)	The Brutalist	Patricia Cuccia and Mercédesz Nagyváradi (Set Decoration); Judy Becker (Production Design)
2024 (5th)	Gladiator II	Jille Azis and Elli Griff (Set Decoration); Arthur Max (Production Design)
2024 (5th)	Maria	Sandro Piccarozzi (Set Decoration); Guy Hendrix Dyas (Production Design)
2024 (5th)	Nosferatu	Beatrice Brentnerová (Set Decoration); Craig Lathrop (Production Design)
