= Set Decorators Society of America Award for Best Achievement in Decor/Design of a Contemporary Feature Film =

The Set Decorators Society of America Award for Best Achievement in Decor/Design of a Contemporary Feature Film is an annual award given by the Set Decorators Society of America. It honors the work set decorators whose work has been deemed the "best" of a given year, in the genre of contemporary film. It was first awarded in 2021.

== Winners and nominees ==
=== 2020s ===
Year	Film	Production Designer(s)
2020 (1st)	Promising Young Woman	Rae Deslich (Set Decoration); Michael T. Perry (Production Design)
2020 (1st)	Da 5 Bloods	Jeanette Scott (Set Decoration); Wynn Thomas (Production Design)
2020 (1st)	Hillbilly Elegy	Merissa Lombardo (Set Decoration); Molly Hughes (Production Design)
2020 (1st)	I'm Thinking of Ending Things	Mattie Siegal (Set Decoration); Molly Hughes (Production Design)
2020 (1st)	Sound of Metal	Tara Pavoni (Set Decoration); Jeremy Woodward (Production Design)
2021 (2nd)	No Time to Die	Véronique Melery (Set Decoration); Mark Tildesley (Production Design)
2021 (2nd)	CODA	Vanessa Knoll (Set Decoration); Diane Lederman (Production Design)
2021 (2nd)	Don't Look Up	Tara Pavoni (Set Decoration); Clayton Hartley (Production Design)
2021 (2nd)	The Hand of God	Iole Autero (Set Decoration); Carmine Guarino (Production Design)
2021 (2nd)	The Lost Daughter	Christine-Athina Vlachos (Set Decoration); Inbal Weinberg (Production Design)
2022 (3rd)	Tár	Ernestine Hipper (Set Decoration); Marco Bittner Rosser (Production Design)
2022 (3rd)	Top Gun: Maverick	Jan Pascale (Set Decoration); Jeremy Hindle (Production Design)
2022 (3rd)	Bardo, False Chronicle of a Handful of Truths	Daniela Rojas Mont (Set Decoration); Eugenio Caballero (Production Design)
2022 (3rd)	Bullet Train	Elizabeth Keenan (Set Decoration); David Scheunemann (Production Design)
2022 (3rd)	Glass Onion: A Knives Out Mystery	Elli Griff (Set Decoration); Rick Heinrichs (Production Design)
2023 (4th)	Saltburn	Charlotte Dirickx (Set Decoration); Suzie Davies (Production Design)
2023 (4th)	The Killer	Brandi Kalish (Set Decoration); Donald Graham Burt (Production Design)
2023 (4th)	Leave the World Behind	David Schlesinger (Set Decoration); Anastasia White (Production Design)
2023 (4th)	May December	Jess Royal (Set Decoration); Sam Lisenco (Production Design)
2023 (4th)	Mission: Impossible – Dead Reckoning Part One	Raffaella Giovannetti (Set Decoration); Gary Freeman (Production Design)
2024 (5th)	Conclave	Cynthia Sleiter (Set Decoration); Suzie Davies (Production Design)
2024 (5th)	Anora	Christopher Phelps (Set Decoration); Stephen Phelps (Production Design)
2024 (5th)	Civil War	Lizbeth Ayala (Set Decoration); Caty Maxey (Production Design)
2024 (5th)	Emilia Pérez	Cécile Deleu (Set Decoration); Emmanuelle Duplay (Production Design)
2024 (5th)	The Substance	Cécilia Blom (Set Decoration); Stanislas Reydellet (Production Design)
