= Bernhard Henrich =

German set decorator

- Born: 1952 (age 72–73); Niederwürzbach, Saarland
- Occupation: Set decorator
- Years active: 1977-present

Bernhard Henrich (born 1952) is a German set decorator. He was nominated at the 88th Academy Awards in the category Best Production Design for his work on the film Bridge of Spies. His nomination was shared with Adam Stockhausen and Rena DeAngelo.

== Selected filmography ==
- Bridge of Spies (2015; co-nominated with Adam Stockhausen and Rena DeAngelo)
