= Paul Hotte =

Canadian production designer and art director

Paul Hotte is a Canadian production designer and art director. Known for his work on films The Fly (1986), Catch Me If You Can (2002), The Aviator (2004), 300 (2006), The Fountain (2006), and Arrival (2016), for the latter he received numerous awards and nominations, including the Academy Award for Best Production Design for the 89th Academy Awards with Patrice Vermette.

== Filmography ==
=== As a set decorator ===
- Brad's Status (2017)
- Arrival (2016)
- Pawn Sacrifice (2014)
- White House Down (2013)
- Zero Hour (2013)
- Upsode Down (2012)
- Beastly (2011)
- Death Race (2008)
- Get Smart (2008)
- The Spiderwick Chronicles (2008)
- 300 (2006)
- King's Ransom (2005)
- The Day After Tomorrow (2004)
- The Art of War (2002)
- Glory & Honor (TV movie) (1998)
- Hollow Point (1996)
- Dr. Jekyll and Ms. Hyde (1995)
- Highlander: The Final Dimension (1994)
- Flight from Justice (TV movie) (1993)
- Canvas (1992)

=== Art department ===
- House of Versace (TV movie) (2013)
- Mirror Mirror (2012)
- Orphan (2009)
- The Fountain (2006)
- The Aviator (2004)
- The Terminal (2004)
- Beyond Borders (2003)
- Catch Me If You Can (2002)
- Inside (Histoire de pen) (2002)
- The Adventures of Pluto Nash (2002)
- The Sum of All Fears (2002)
- P.T. Barnum (TV movie) (1999)
- Histoires d'hiver (1999)
- A Walk on the Moon (1999)
- The Mystery Files of Shelby Woo (TV series) (1998)
- Silent Trigger (key set decorator) (1996)
- Shadow of the Wolf (props buyer) (1992)
- Cannonball Fever (property master) (1989)
- Jacknife (property buyer: Montreal) (1989)
- Midnight Magic (TV movie) (property buyer) (1988)
- Shades of Love: The Emerald Tear (TV movie) (props) (1988)
- Shades of Love: Tangerine Taxi (TV movie) (property buyer) (1988)
- Hitting Home (property master) (1988)
- The Fly (1986)
- Barnum (TV movie) (property master) (1986)
- The Boy in Blue (1986)

== Awards and nominations ==
- Academy Award for Best Production Design
- Critics' Choice Movie Award for Best Art Direction
- Washington D.C. Area Film Critics Association Award for Best Art Direction
- Florida Film Critics Circle Award for Best Art Direction/Production Designer
- Art Directors Guild Award for Excellence in Production Design for a Fantasy Film
