= Bros (2022 film) =

2022 film by Nicholas Stoller

- Theatrical release poster
- Directed by: Nicholas Stoller
- Written by: Billy Eichner; Nicholas Stoller
- Produced by: Judd Apatow; Nicholas Stoller; Joshua Church
- Starring: Billy Eichner; Luke Macfarlane
- Cinematography: Brandon Trost
- Edited by: Daniel Gabbe
- Music by: Marc Shaiman
- Production companies: Universal Pictures; Stoller Global Solutions; Apatow Productions
- Distributed by: Universal Pictures
- Release dates: September 9, 2022 (TIFF); September 30, 2022 (United States)
- Running time: 115 minutes
- Country: United States
- Language: English
- Budget: $22 million
- Box office: $14.8 million

Bros is a 2022 American romantic comedy film starring Billy Eichner and Luke Macfarlane as two gay men in Manhattan who avoid commitment but are drawn to each other. The film is directed by Nicholas Stoller based on a screenplay he co-wrote with Eichner and is produced by Stoller, Judd Apatow, and Josh Church. Produced under Universal Pictures on a budget of $22 million, it is one of the first gay romantic comedies by a major studio that has an openly LGBTQ principal cast.

Bros premiered at the Toronto International Film Festival on September 9, 2022. Universal spent between $30–40 million marketing the film and commercially released it in theaters in the United States on September 30, 2022. The film received generally positive reviews from critics, but was a box-office bomb, grossing $14 million worldwide against a production budget of $22 million.

== Plot ==
In New York City, Bobby Lieber, host of the podcast and radio show The Eleventh Brick at Stonewall who prides himself on being single, attends an awards ceremony for the LGBTQ community, where he wins an award for "Best White Cis Gay Man". He announces that he has accepted a position as a curator for the upcoming national LGBTQ+ history museum in Manhattan.

Bobby joins his friend Henry at a nightclub where a new gay dating app is being launched, and spots Aaron Shepard, whom Henry describes as hot but "boring". Aaron and Bobby flirt, but Aaron does not seem interested in Bobby. A few days later, the two start spending time together, but their connection is not strong. While on a date at the movies, Aaron runs into a former high school hockey teammate, Josh, and his fiancée. Bobby and Aaron are unsure what to make of their time together; Bobby feels Aaron acts too straight and Aaron thinks Bobby is too intense and that his clout in the gay community is intimidating. Aaron later discovers that Josh called off his engagement and has come out as gay.

After some time apart, Aaron confides to Bobby that his original dream was to be a chocolatier, but had thought that it was unachievable and never pursued it. Bobby invites Aaron to a trip to Provincetown, where he solicits an eccentric millionaire for a donation to the struggling museum. The millionaire is unimpressed by Bobby at first, but Aaron helps him to adjust his pitch, and they secure a $5 million donation. Bobby is impressed by Aaron and the two grow closer romantically, and Bobby opens up about having to tone down his flamboyant behavior to make others comfortable.

Bobby and Aaron date for several months and Aaron integrates into Bobby's group of friends. At a Christmas party, Josh arrives and Aaron asks Bobby if they can have a threesome. Bobby agrees, but later recants on his wishes after seeing the connection Aaron and Josh have. When Aaron's family comes to the city for a visit, Bobby's excessive, outspoken behavior ends up causing a rift between the two men. Aaron hooks up with Josh again and they break up. People are threatening to boycott the museum and pull donations over an exhibit Bobby created that suggests that Abraham Lincoln was gay.

Sometime later, Bobby returns to work and reconciles with his coworkers over his outburst over the exhibit. The others all admit they have their own issues as well over matters such as their sexual identities, and agree to compromise on the exhibits that will be presented. Meanwhile, Aaron quits his job and fulfills his dream of making chocolates, telling Bobby that all proceeds will go to the museum.

On the opening night of the museum, a large crowd turns out. Bobby misses Aaron, and after talking to his friend Tina, decides to text him. Aaron receives the text and is encouraged by his brother to go after the person he loves, arriving just as Bobby begins his speech. When he sees Aaron, he proceeds to sing a song he wrote about their relationship, inspired by the music of Garth Brooks, Aaron's favorite singer. When the song ends, Bobby and Aaron kiss, to applause from the crowd. Three months later, Aaron's mother brings her 2nd-grade class to the museum, and Bobby and Aaron are still dating.

== Cast ==
- Billy Eichner as Bobby Lieber
- Luke Macfarlane as Aaron Shepard
- Guy Branum as Henry
- Miss Lawrence as Wanda
- Ts Madison as Angela
- Dot-Marie Jones as Cherry
- Jim Rash as Robert
- Eve Lindley as Tamara
- Monica Raymund as Tina
- Guillermo Díaz as Edgar
- Jai Rodriguez as Jason
- Amanda Bearse as Anne
- Debra Messing as herself
- Peter Kim as Peter
- Justin Covington as Paul
- Symone as Marty
- Ryan Faucett as Josh
- Becca Blackwell as Lucas
- D'Lo as Tom
- Harvey Fierstein as Louis
- Bowen Yang as Lawrence Grape
- Brock Ciarlelli as Steve
- Kenan Thompson as James Baldwin
- Amy Schumer as Eleanor Roosevelt
- Julia Scotti as Straight Older Woman
- Kristin Chenoweth as herself
- Ben Stiller as himself (uncredited)
- Seth Meyers as Harvey Milk (uncredited)

== Production ==
On February 5, 2019, it was announced that Billy Eichner would write, executive produce and star in a romantic comedy feature film, directed and co-written by Nick Stoller. Principal photography was set to begin on June 7, 2021, in Buffalo, New York, and Provincetown, Massachusetts. Filming subsequently took place in Manhattan, Jersey City and in downtown Cranford, New Jersey. Stoller previously directed Eichner in Neighbors 2: Sorority Rising, which received praise for its depiction of a gay relationship and positive support from heterosexual cisgender male friends compared to many comedies which used gay panic for laughs.

Most of the cast was revealed on September 23, 2021, and September 30, 2021. Bowen Yang and Harvey Fierstein were revealed to have joined the cast on November 4, 2021. Benito Skinner also joined the cast, though his role was cut from the final film.

The film is a gay romantic comedy from a major studio featuring a predominantly LGBTQ+ principal cast; Debra Messing and Kristin Chenoweth are also in the cast, but in smaller cameo roles, playing themselves. Stoller calls them "allies" of the community.

== Release ==
=== Theatrical ===
Bros had its world premiere at the Toronto International Film Festival on September 9, 2022, and was theatrically released in the United States on September 30, 2022, by Universal Pictures. It was originally scheduled for release on August 12, 2022. Prior to its commercial release, the film was allegedly subjected to homophobic review bombing from users on IMDb; although this was just speculated.

=== Home media ===
Bros was released on PVOD on October 18, 2022 and on Blu-ray and DVD on November 22, 2022. Despite failing at the box office, the film found moderate success from PVOD rentals; ranking number 2 on Vudu (calculated by revenue) and number 3 on iTunes and Google Play (ranked by transactions). Tom Brueggemann of IndieWire called it "quite good for a studio release that fared this poorly in theaters."

== Reception ==
=== Box office ===
Bros grossed $11.6 million in the United States and Canada, and $3.2 million in other territories, for a total worldwide gross of $14.8 million. The film's box office performance was labeled a box office bomb by several media outlets.

In the United States and Canada, Bros was released alongside Smile, and was initially projected to gross $8–10 million from 3,350 theaters in its opening weekend. After making $1.8 million on its first day of release, including $500,000 from Thursday night previews, projections were revised to $4–5 million. The film went on to debut to $4.9 million, finishing fifth at the box office. The film's top 10-performing theaters were all in New York, San Francisco, and Los Angeles, while it underperformed in much of the middle of the country and in the south. Opening-weekend audiences polled by CinemaScore gave the film an average grade of "A" on an A+ to F scale, while those at PostTrak gave the film an 80% overall positive score, with 69% saying they would definitely recommend it. The film fell 55.5% to $2.2 million in its sophomore weekend, finishing in eighth.

Eichner expressed disappointment at the film's box office results, saying that "straight people, especially in certain parts of the country, just didn't show up for Bros." Zack Sharf and William Earl from Variety countered in an analysis that other factors contributed to the film's poor box office, stating that "straight people aren't entirely to blame" and that "many LGBTQ viewers didn't show up to see the comedy in theaters either." While they viewed homophobia as a likely component, they also noted other factors such as a lack of interest in the material, a lack of star power, the marketing focusing on representation over its humor, timing of its release date, competition from anticipated streaming releases such as Blonde and Hocus Pocus 2 (all three films were released concurrently), and audiences' possible fading interest in Apatow's films. They also noted that more women than expected had shown up to see the film.

The film's marketing was also noted by Drew Gillis of The A.V. Club, stating, "more than a couple A.V. Club commenters pointed out that the film’s trailer seemed to tell straight audiences that this wasn’t a movie for them—the 'Remember straight people?' line at the end of the trailer was specifically highlighted." The factors noted by Variety were reflected in similar analyses by Richard Newby of The Hollywood Reporter and Scott Mendelson of Forbes. Newby noted that Eichner's strong-arm tactics of shaming heterosexual viewers into seeing the film did not bode well with potential viewers, calling Eichner's Twitter messages "finger-wagging followed by moralistic confrontation than an invitation with a bit of warning." Mendelson also iterated that heterosexual audiences were not entirely to blame.

Ts Madison, who had appeared in a supporting role in the film, expressed the opinion that the film's commercial underperformance could be attributed at least partially to people who were willing to see the film nonetheless having misgivings about other people seeing them buy tickets for it in a public theatre, and speculated that it would likely perform better on home streaming platforms where people could view it in privacy.

Following the film's release, Eichner took to his Twitter to repel criticism from people celebrating the film's poor box office results, vowing to tweet about the film every day to spite critics.

=== Critical response ===
On the review aggregator website Rotten Tomatoes, the film holds an approval rating of 88% based on 231 reviews, with an average rating of 7.6/10. The site's critics' consensus reads, "Bros marks a step forward in rom-com representation – and just as importantly, it's a whole bunch of fun to watch." On Metacritic, the film has a weighted average score of 72 out of 100 based on 46 critics, indicating "generally favorable" reviews.

TheWrap's Alonso Duralde praised Macfarlane's performance, writing: "Like Bobby, this gay critic's not-so-secret comfort viewing is Hallmark Christmas movies, and I've always enjoyed Macfarlane's work as a charming romantic lead in them, but Bros offers the kind of complexity and shading (to say nothing of humor) that Hallmark never could. Anyone coming into this film only knowing Macfarlane for his cozy cable movies will leave with a new appreciation of this versatile actor's wheelhouse." Marya E. Gates of RogerEbert.com gave the film 2.5 out of 4 stars, writing: "Its perpetual commentary on the mainstreaming of queerness remains at odds with its very desire to tell its story within the Hollywood system." Writing for Consequence, Clint Worthington gave the film a B− and said: "When it focuses on Eichner and Macfarlane, and the ever-complicated mores of queer masculinity, it stays charming and light on its feet. If it were a little less self-conscious about that homonormativity, it'd have a more cohesive identity, and be more of a slam dunk in the process."

=== Accolades ===
Award	Date of ceremony	Category	Recipient(s)	Result	Ref.
Hollywood Music in Media Awards	November 16, 2022	Best Original Song in a Feature Film	Billy Eichner and Marc Shaiman ("Love Is Not Love")	Nominated	
Hollywood Music in Media Awards	November 16, 2022	Song – Onscreen Performance (Film)	Billy Eichner ("Love Is Not Love")	Won	
Hollywood Music in Media Awards	November 16, 2022	Best Music Supervision — Film	Rob Lowry	Nominated	
Critics' Choice Movie Awards	January 15, 2023	Best Comedy	Bros	Nominated	
Set Decorators Society of America Awards	February 14, 2023	Best Achievement in Decor/Design of a Comedy or Musical Feature Film	Nicki Ritchie and Lisa Myers	Nominated	
Hollywood Critics Association Awards	February 24, 2023	Best Comedy or Musical	Bros	Nominated	
GLAAD Media Awards	March 30, 2023	Outstanding Film - Wide Release	Bros	Won	

== See also ==
- LGBT culture in New York City
