= George DeTitta Sr. =

American set decorator (1930–2024)

- Born: November 26, 1930; The Bronx, New York, U.S.
- Died: December 23, 2024 (aged 94)
- Occupation: Set decorator
- Years active: 1965–1992
- Children: George DeTitta Jr.

George M. DeTitta Sr. (November 26, 1930 – December 23, 2024) was an American set decorator. He was nominated for an Academy Award in the category Best Art Direction for the film Ragtime.

== Selected filmography ==
- Ragtime (1981)
