= Bardo, False Chronicle of a Handful of Truths =

2022 film by Alejandro G. Iñárritu

- Mexican release poster
- Spanish: Bardo, falsa crónica de unas cuantas verdades
- Directed by: Alejandro G. Iñárritu
- Written by: Alejandro G. Iñárritu; Nicolás Giacobone
- Produced by: Alejandro G. Iñárritu; Stacy Perskie Kaniss
- Starring: Daniel Giménez Cacho; Griselda Siciliani
- Cinematography: Darius Khondji
- Edited by: Alejandro G. Iñárritu; Mónica Salazar (Note: Credited separately as "co-editor")
- Music by: Bryce Dessner; Alejandro G. Iñárritu
- Production companies: M Producciones; Redrum
- Distributed by: Netflix
- Release dates: September 1, 2022 (Venice); October 27, 2022 (Mexico)
- Running time: 174 minutes (Venice cut); 159 minutes (Final cut)
- Country: Mexico
- Languages: Spanish; English
- Box office: $43,116

Bardo, False Chronicle of a Handful of Truths (Spanish: Bardo, falsa crónica de unas cuantas verdades), or simply Bardo, is a 2022 Mexican epic psychological black comedy-drama film co-written, co-scored, co-edited, produced, and directed by Alejandro G. Iñárritu. The film stars Daniel Giménez Cacho alongside Griselda Siciliani, and follows a journalist/documentarian who returns to his native country of Mexico and begins having an existential crisis in the form of dreamlike visions. The title refers to the Buddhist concept of the bardo, a liminal state between death and rebirth. It is Iñárritu's first film to be fully filmed in Mexico since Amores perros in 2000.

Bardo premiered on September 1, 2022 at the 79th Venice International Film Festival in competition for the Golden Lion. It was released in theaters on November 18, 2022, then streamed on Netflix on December 16, 2022. The film received polarized reviews from critics, who praised the performances, cinematography, and direction, but were divided on its writing and runtime. It was selected as the Mexican entry for the Best International Feature Film at the 95th Academy Awards, making the shortlist of fifteen films, but was not nominated. It received an Academy Award nomination for Best Cinematography.

== Plot ==
Silverio Gama is a Mexican journalist turned documentary filmmaker living in Los Angeles with his wife, Lucía, and son, Lorenzo. His work has become increasingly personal and subjective as he has grown older; his latest film, False Chronicle of a Handful of Truths, is a work of docufiction with autobiographical elements. Silverio and Lucía are happy together, but they are haunted by the death of their first son, Mateo, a day after his birth. The two keep Mateo's ashes and feel unable to move on from his loss. Silverio experiences much of his day-to-day life in surreal fashion, with dreams, memories, and fantasies playing out alongside his activities. When he meets the US ambassador to Mexico at Chapultepec Castle, for instance, he envisions the events of the 1847 Battle of Chapultepec and the suicides of the Niños Héroes around him.

Silverio learns that he will be the first Latin American to receive a prestigious American award for journalism. He speculates that he is only receiving the award to ease tensions between the United States and Mexico (inflamed by negative perceptions of U.S.–Mexico migration as well as Amazon's attempts to purchase the Mexican state of Baja California), but nevertheless tries to deal with a wave of media scrutiny in his home country. He cancels an interview on a popular talk show at the last minute, reminisces about his time as a husband and father, and tries to strike a balance between attacking the problems he sees with the Mexican state and defending its people from stereotypes. Secretly, he feels guilty over emigrating to the U.S. when so many other Mexicans cannot leave.

Silverio and his family attend a party held in his honor. He reunites with his siblings and extended family, to whom he is indifferent, and his daughter, Camila, whom he lavishes with attention. When the talk show host scathingly criticizes Silverio's work, the filmmaker responds by insulting the host personally. Silverio eventually flees into the restroom, where he imagines reconciliations with his deceased father and mother. When he leaves his mother's apartment, he sees symbolic representations of historic atrocities in Mexico: hundreds of people signifying those kidnapped or killed by organized crime collapse in a commercial district, and Hernán Cortés sits atop a pile of corpses in the Zócalo, lecturing Silverio about the indigenous genocide.

Before travelling back to Los Angeles, Silverio and his family vacation in Baja California, just as Amazon buys the state. Camila tells Silverio that she will quit her job in Boston, Massachusetts, to move back to Mexico, which Silverio tentatively welcomes. The family decide to scatter Mateo's ashes in the ocean before leaving for the U.S., where they are treated with contempt by a Hispanic-American customs official.

After Lorenzo reminds him of a time when his pet axolotls died, Silverio buys some as a surprise gift. On the L.A. Metro ride from the pet store (in a repeat of an earlier scene), Silverio has a violent stroke and is left unattended on the train for several hours. He languishes in a coma, and it is revealed that the events of the film so far have been his comatose brain's attempts to process his life experience. Camila accepts the award in Silverio's absence, and she and his other family members and friends sit by his bedside, holding conversations and playing songs or television broadcasts that have inadvertently affected his dreams.

In a near-featureless desert within his mind, Silverio reunites with his dead family members and ignores projections of his living family. He sees a copy of himself, which mirrors his movements for a short time before walking away. The film ends as it began, with Silverio imagining himself flying through the desert. It is unclear if he has died, reawakened, or learned to live with his baggage.

== Cast ==
- Daniel Giménez Cacho as Silverio Gama
  - Diego Tello de Meneses as 11-year-old Silverio
- Griselda Siciliani as Lucía Gama
- Ximena Lamadrid as Camila Gama
- Iker Sanchez Solano as Lorenzo Gama
- Jay O. Sanders as Ambassador Jones
- Andrés Almeida as Martín
- Francisco Rubio as Luis
- Rubén Zamora as Silverio's brother
- Mar Carrera as Lucero
- Fabiola Guajardo as Tania
- Daniel Damuzi as Antonio
- José Antonio Toledano as Juan Escutia
- María Cobar as Niece
- Fernanda Borches as Presenter
- Iván Massagué as Hernán Cortés
- Luz Jiménez as Silverio Gama’s mother
- Luis Gnecco as Secretary of government
- Grantham Coleman as CNN reporter

== Production ==
=== Development ===
On March 22, 2020, it was reported that Alejandro G.Iñárritu would write, direct and produce a new film, to be shot in Mexico, Bradford Young as cinematographer, and Patrice Vermette as production designer. On March 9, 2021, Griselda Siciliani joined the cast, with Grantham Coleman that July.

=== Filming ===
Principal photography began on March 3, 2021, in Mexico City, with Darius Khondji as cinematographer and Eugenio Caballero as production designer, under the working title Limbo. Khondji paired the large format Alexa 65 camera with Panavision Sphero lenses, shooting almost the entirety of the film on the 17mm and the 21mm. Five months of filming were planned in other locations in the Capital and the Estudios Churubusco.

On March 4, 2021, during filming in the historic center of Mexico City, a passerby was arrested for striking a production security member. In September 2021, it was reported that the film had completed production.

=== Post-production ===
Iñárritu continued editing the film after its premiere at Venice. The version screened at San Sebastián, in late September 2022, had a running time of 152 minutes, without credits, 22 minutes shorter than the one screened at Venice and Telluride. The final runtime released by Netflix was set at 160 minutes including the credits.

== Release ==
Bardo, False Chronicle of a Handful of Truths had its world premiere at the 79th Venice International Film Festival on September 1, 2022, it was screened for the first time in the US at the 49th Telluride Film Festival. The film was also screened at the 70th San Sebastián International Film Festival, in late September, and at the 2022 AFI Fest, in late November.

It was released in theaters in Mexico on October 27, 2022, then a limited release in United States theatres on November 4 and on Netflix on December 16.

== Reception ==
=== Critical response ===
On the review aggregator website Rotten Tomatoes, 60% of 166 critics' reviews are positive, with an average rating of 6.4/10. The website's consensus reads: "As deeply personal as it is demanding, Bardo, False Chronicle of a Handful of Truths unsteadily walks the line between brilliance and sheer self-indulgence." Metacritic, which uses a weighted average, assigned the film a score of 55 out of 100, based on 37 critics, indicating "mixed or average" reviews.

In an interview with Los Angeles Times, Iñárritu believed there was a racial bias among the critics and stated that a filmmaker's expressions of themselves shouldn't be considered as self-indulgent or emulating other thematically related works. Filmmaker Lulu Wang praised the film, calling it "an exuberant film from a world-class artist who forges dreams (and nightmares) in lights and then dares to share it with the world."

=== Accolades ===
Award	Date of ceremony	Category	Recipient(s)	Result	Ref.
Venice Film Festival	September 10, 2022	Golden Lion	Alejandro G. Iñárritu	Nominated	
Venice Film Festival	September 10, 2022	UNIMED Award	Alejandro G. Iñárritu	Won	
The International Film Festival of the Art of Cinematography Camerimage	November 19, 2022	Main Competition (Silver Frog)	Darius Khondji	Won	
The International Film Festival of the Art of Cinematography Camerimage	November 19, 2022	FIPRESCI Award	Bardo, False Chronicle of a Handful of Truths	Won	
Chicago Film Critics Association	December 14, 2022	Best Foreign Language Film	Bardo, False Chronicle of a Handful of Truths	Nominated	
Chicago Film Critics Association	December 14, 2022	Best Cinematography	Darius Khondji	Nominated	
Alliance of Women Film Journalists	January 5, 2023	Best Non-English Language Film	Bardo, False Chronicle of a Handful of Truths	Nominated	
Georgia Film Critics Association	January 13, 2023	Best Cinematography	Darius Khondji	Nominated	
Critics' Choice Movie Awards	January 15, 2023	Best Foreign Language Film	Bardo, False Chronicle of a Handful of Truths	Nominated	
AARP Movies for Grownups Awards	January 28, 2023	Best Foreign Film	Bardo, False Chronicle of a Handful of Truths	Nominated	
Satellite Awards	February 11, 2023	Best Motion Picture – International	Bardo, False Chronicle of a Handful of Truths	Nominated	
Set Decorators Society of America Awards	February 14, 2023	Best Achievement in Decor/Design of a Contemporary Feature Film	Daniela Rojas Mont and Eugenio Caballero	Nominated	
Art Directors Guild Awards	February 18, 2023	Excellence in Production Design for a Contemporary Film	Eugenio Caballero	Nominated	
Golden Reel Awards	February 26, 2023	Outstanding Achievement in Sound Editing – Foreign Language Feature	Martín Hernández, Nicolas Becker, Ken Yasumoto, Alejandro Quevedo, Jaime Sainz, Carolina Santana, Alitzel Diaz, Daniel Douglass, Valeria López Mancheva, Raynier Hinojosa, Omar Blanco, Oscar Victoria, Pietu Korhonen, Alan Romero, Heikki Kossi, Alan Romero	Nominated	
American Society of Cinematographers Awards	March 5, 2023	Outstanding Achievement in Cinematography in Theatrical Releases	Darius Khondji	Nominated	
Academy Awards	March 12, 2023	Best Cinematography	Darius Khondji	Nominated	
Platino Awards	April 22, 2023	Best Ibero-American Film	Bardo, False Chronicle of a Handful of Truths	Nominated	
Platino Awards	April 22, 2023	Best Comedy Film	Bardo, False Chronicle of a Handful of Truths	Nominated	
Platino Awards	April 22, 2023	Best Director	Alejandro González Iñarritu	Nominated	
Platino Awards	April 22, 2023	Best Actor	Daniel Giménez Cacho	Nominated	
Platino Awards	April 22, 2023	Best Screenplay	Alejandro González Iñarritu, Nicolás Giacobone	Nominated	
Platino Awards	April 22, 2023	Best Art Direction	Eugenio Caballero	Nominated	
Golden Trailer Awards	June 29, 2023	Best Foreign Trailer	"Journey" (AV Squad)	Nominated	
Ariel Awards	September 9, 2023	Best Picture	Bardo, False Chronicle of a Handful of Truths	Nominated	
Ariel Awards	September 9, 2023	Best Director	Alejandro González Iñárritu	Won	
Ariel Awards	September 9, 2023	Best Actor	Daniel Giménez Cacho	Won	
Ariel Awards	September 9, 2023	Best Supporting Actor	Francisco Rubio	Nominated	
Ariel Awards	September 9, 2023	Best Cinematography	Darius Khondji	Won	
Ariel Awards	September 9, 2023	Best Original Score	Bryce Dessner, Alejandro G. Iñárritu	Nominated	
Ariel Awards	September 9, 2023	Best Sound	Nicolas Becker, Martín Hernández, Ken Yasumoto, Frankie Montano, Jon Taylor, Santiago Núñez	Won	
Ariel Awards	September 9, 2023	Best Editing	Alejandro G. Iñárritu	Won	
Ariel Awards	September 9, 2023	Best Art Direction	Eugenio Caballero	Won	
Ariel Awards	September 9, 2023	Best Makeup	Lucy Betancourt	Nominated	
Ariel Awards	September 9, 2023	Best Costume Design	Anna Terrazas	Won	
Ariel Awards	September 9, 2023	Best Visual Effects	Guillaume Rocheron, Olaf Wendt	Won	
Rolling Stone en Español Awards	October 26, 2023	Fiction Feature Film of the Year	Bardo, False Chronicle of a Handful of Truths	Nominated	
Rolling Stone en Español Awards	October 26, 2023	Direction of the Year	Alejandro González Iñárritu	Won	
Rolling Stone en Español Awards	October 26, 2023	Performance of the Year	Daniel Giménez Cacho	Nominated	

== See also ==
- List of submissions to the 95th Academy Awards for Best International Feature Film
- List of Mexican submissions for the Academy Award for Best International Feature Film
