= Cynthia Sleiter =

Italian set decorator

- Occupation: Set decorator
- Years active: 1993–present

Cynthia Sleiter is an Italian set decorator. She was nominated for an Academy Award in the category Best Production Design for the film Conclave.

== Selected filmography ==
- Conclave (2024; co-nominated with Suzie Davies)
