= Anthony Carlino =

American set decorator

- Occupation: Set decorator

Anthony Carlino is an American set decorator. He was nominated for two Academy Awards in the category Best Production Design for the films Babylon and One Battle After Another.

At the 76th British Academy Film Awards, he won a BAFTA Award for Best Production Design. His win was shared with production designer Florencia Martin.

== Selected filmography ==
- Babylon (2022)
- One Battle After Another (2025)
