= Ray Chan (art director) =

British art director and production designer (1967–2024)

- Chan in Marvel Studios: Assembled, 2021
- Born: Raymond Chan; 1 December 1967; Oldham, Greater Manchester, England
- Died: 23 April 2024 (aged 56); Glamorgan, Wales
- Education: Liverpool School of Art; Kingston School of Art
- Occupations: Art director; production designer
- Years active: 1993–2024
- Spouse: Lindsay Gibbon
- Children: 2
- Awards: ADG Excellence in Production Design Award (2015, 2020)

Raymond Chan (1 December 1967 – 23 April 2024) was a British art director and production designer best known for his work on several films in the Marvel Cinematic Universe (MCU) franchise.

== Early life and education ==
Raymond Chan was born the oldest of three children to Hong Kong parents in Oldham on 1 December 1967. His mother was a machinist and his father was a bus driver. He graduated from the Liverpool School of Art, with a degree in graphic design. Chan then went on to earn a Masters degree in Film and Television at Kingston School of Art.

== Career ==
Chan began his career in 1993 with The Secret Rapture. He first joined Marvel Studios on Thor: The Dark World as a supervising art director. His credits as a supervising art director included Guardians of the Galaxy, Avengers: Age of Ultron, Doctor Strange, Avengers: Infinity War, Avengers: Endgame and Spider-Man: Far From Home. Chan's credits as a production designer included The Falcon and the Winter Soldier, Ant-Man and the Wasp: Quantumania, Dungeons & Dragons: Honor Among Thieves, and Deadpool & Wolverine. Chan's credits as art director also include King Arthur, Monte Carlo, Nanny McPhee, National Treasure, Blood Diamond, Knight and Day, Wrath of the Titans, Alien vs. Predator and Children of Men. He was featured on Marvel Studios: Assembled in 2021.

Nominated for it five times, Chan won the ADG Excellence in Production Design Award for his work on Guardians of the Galaxy in 2015 and for his work on Avengers: Endgame in 2020.

== Personal life and death ==
Chan was married to Lindsay Gibbon, an architect, and had two children, Caspar and Sebastian.

Chan died near his home in Wales on 23 April 2024, at the age of 56. His final film, Deadpool & Wolverine, was released three months later and was dedicated in his memory.

At the 97th Academy Awards, there was a tribute to his name in the In Memoriam section. Chan was also similarly remembered at the 78th British Academy Film Awards.

== Filmography ==
Year	Title	Studio	Notes
1993	The Secret Rapture	Castle Hill Productions	Art department assistant
1994–1996	Screen Two	BBC	Storyboard artist / set dresser
1995	Hackers	MGM/UA Distribution Co.	Junior draughtsman
1997	Robinson Crusoe	Miramax Films / RHI Entertainment	Assistant art director
1997–2000	The Hunger	Showtime	Assistant art director
1997	The Wings of the Dove	Miramax Films	Assistant art director
1999	The Lost Son	Artisan Entertainment	Art director
2000	Five Seconds to Spare	ContentFilm International	Art director
2001	Enigma	Manhattan Pictures International	Stand-by art airector
2002	Heartlands	Miramax Films / DNA Films	Art director
2003	Johnny English	Universal Pictures / StudioCanal / Working Title Films	Art director: second unit
2004	King Arthur	Touchstone Pictures / Jerry Bruckheimer Films	Supervising art director
2004	Thunderbirds	Universal Pictures / StudioCanal / Working Title Films	Art director
2004	Alien vs. Predator	20th Century Fox / Davis Entertainment / Brandywine Productions / Impact Pictures / Stillking Films	Art director
2004	National Treasure	Walt Disney Pictures / Jerry Bruckheimer Films	Supervising art director; uncredited
2005	The Honeymooners	Paramount Pictures	Draughtsperson
2005	Stoned	Screen Media Films	Art director
2005	Nanny McPhee	Universal Pictures / Metro-Goldwyn-Mayer Pictures / Working Title Films	Art director; uncredited
2006	Flyboys	MGM Distribution Co. / Metro-Goldwyn-Mayer Pictures / Electric Entertainment / Skydance Productions / Ingenious Media	Supervising art director
2006	Blood Diamond	Warner Bros. Pictures	Supervising art director
2006	Children of Men	Universal Pictures	Art director
2008	Fool's Gold	Warner Bros. Pictures	Supervising art director
2008	How to Lose Friends & Alienate People	Paramount Pictures	Supervising art director
2010	Robin Hood	Universal Pictures	Senior art director
2010	Knight and Day	20th Century Fox / Regency Enterprises / Dune Entertainment	Supervising art director
2011	Monte Carlo	20th Century Fox / Fox 2000 Pictures / Regency Enterprises	Supervising art director
2012	Wrath of the Titans	Warner Bros. Pictures / Legendary Pictures	Supervising art director
2013	Thor: The Dark World	Marvel Studios	Supervising art director
2014	Guardians of the Galaxy	Marvel Studios	Supervising art director
2015	Avengers: Age of Ultron	Marvel Studios	Supervising art director
2016	Doctor Strange	Marvel Studios	Supervising art director
2018	Avengers: Infinity War	Marvel Studios	Supervising art director
2019	Avengers: Endgame	Marvel Studios	Supervising art director / production designer; additional photography
2019	Spider-Man: Far From Home	Marvel Studios	Supervising art director
2021	The Falcon and the Winter Soldier	Marvel Studios	Production designer
2023	Ant-Man and the Wasp: Quantumania	Marvel Studios	Production designer; additional photography
2023	Dungeons & Dragons: Honor Among Thieves	Paramount Pictures / Hasbro / Entertainment One	Production designer
2024	Deadpool & Wolverine	Marvel Studios / Maximum Effort / 21 Laps Entertainment	Production designer; posthumous release
