= James D. Bissell =

American production designer

James D. Bissell FRSA
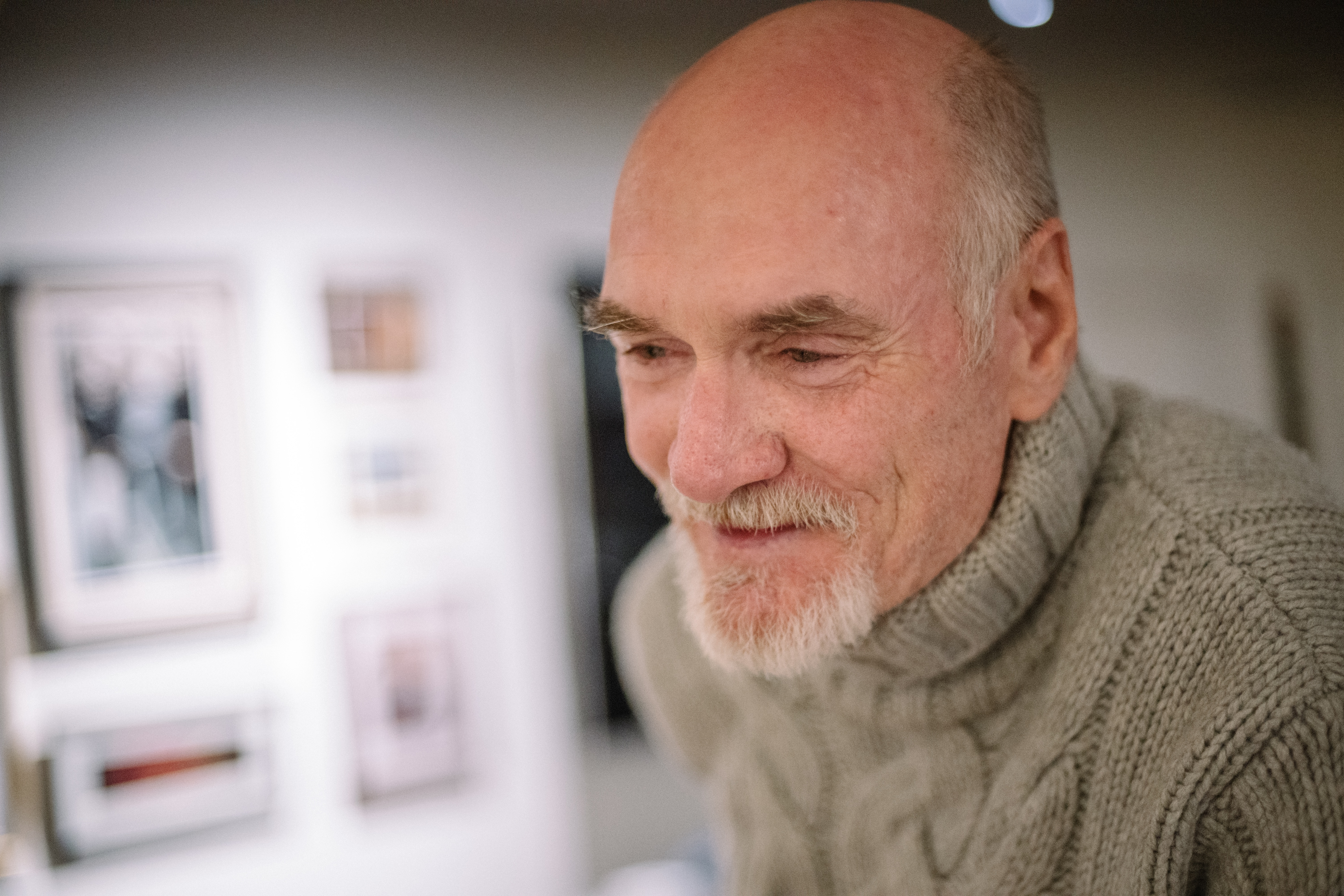
- Born: James Dougal Bissell; August 6, 1951 (age 75); Charleston, South Carolina, USA
- Other name: Jim Bissell
- Occupation: Production Designer
- Years active: 1977–present
- Spouse: Martha Snetsinger
- Children: 3

James D. Bissell (born 1951) is an American production designer.

== Early life ==
Jim Bissell was born in Charleston, South Carolina, the only child of Elizabeth and James Bissell. In his youth, he moved around and traveled with his father from Hawaii to Bermuda and so many places in between. After he graduated from high school Bissell attended the University of North Carolina at Chapel Hill, working in the theater department. In 1973, Bissell graduated with a BFA and decided to make it to New York. He made it by working on low-budget features and commercials.

== Career ==
Bissell soon moved to Los Angeles to exploit his talent in the world's entertainment capital. He found steady work on the set of the television series Palmerstown, U.S.A. In 1980, he was awarded an Emmy for his work on the show, and around that time, he was discovered by Steven Spielberg while he was shooting on the same lot. Bissell would later receive a BAFTA nomination for production design on Spielberg's next project, E.T. the Extra-Terrestrial. While working on Jumanji (1995), Bissell met his wife, Martha. Bissell's collaboration with George Clooney began in 2002 with Confessions Of A Dangerous Mind, followed by Good Night and Good Luck, which landed him an Oscar nomination, Leatherheads, The Monuments Men, Suburbicon, and most recently The Midnight Sky.

== Personal life ==
Bissell is married to Martha Wynne. Jim and Martha have three children.

He is a known Joseph Campbell fan.

He is a fellow of the Royal Society of Arts.

== Awards ==
Bissell won the Emmy for "Outstanding Art Direction for a Series" for his work on "Palmerstown, U.S.A." Bissell was nominated for the BAFTA for "Best Production Design/Art Direction" for his work on "E.T. the Extra-Terrestrial." Bissell has been nominated for three different Art Directors Guild Awards for his work on "Good Night, and Good Luck," "300," and "The Spiderwick Chronicles" Bissell was nominated at the 78th Academy Awards in the category of Best Art Direction for his work on the movie Good Night, and Good Luck. His nomination was shared with Jan Pascale. In 2015, he received the Art Directors Guild lifetime achievement award.
