= Beatrice Brentnerová =

Czech art director and set decorator

- Occupation(s): Art director, set decorator

Beatrice Brentnerová is a Czech art director and set decorator. She was nominated for an Academy Award in the category Best Production Design for the film Nosferatu.

== Selected filmography ==
- Nosferatu (2024; co-nominated with Craig Lathrop)
