= Craig Lathrop =

Canadian art director and production designer

- Occupations: Art director, production designer

Craig Lathrop is a Canadian art director and production designer. He was nominated for an Academy Award in the category Best Production Design for the film Nosferatu.

== Selected filmography ==
- Nosferatu (2024; co-nominated with Beatrice Brentnerová)
