= Elli Griff =

British set decorator

- Occupation: Set decorator

Elli Griff is a British set decorator. She was nominated for an Academy Award in the category Best Production Design for the film Napoleon.

== Selected filmography ==
- Captain Jack (1999)
- Black Hawk Down (2001)
- Until Death (2007)
- Hellboy II: The Golden Army (2008)
- Edge of Tomorrow (2014)
- The Man from U.N.C.L.E. (2015)
- Uncharted (2022)
- Glass Onion: A Knives Out Mystery (2022)
- Napoleon (2023)
