= Mark Tildesley (production designer) =

British designer

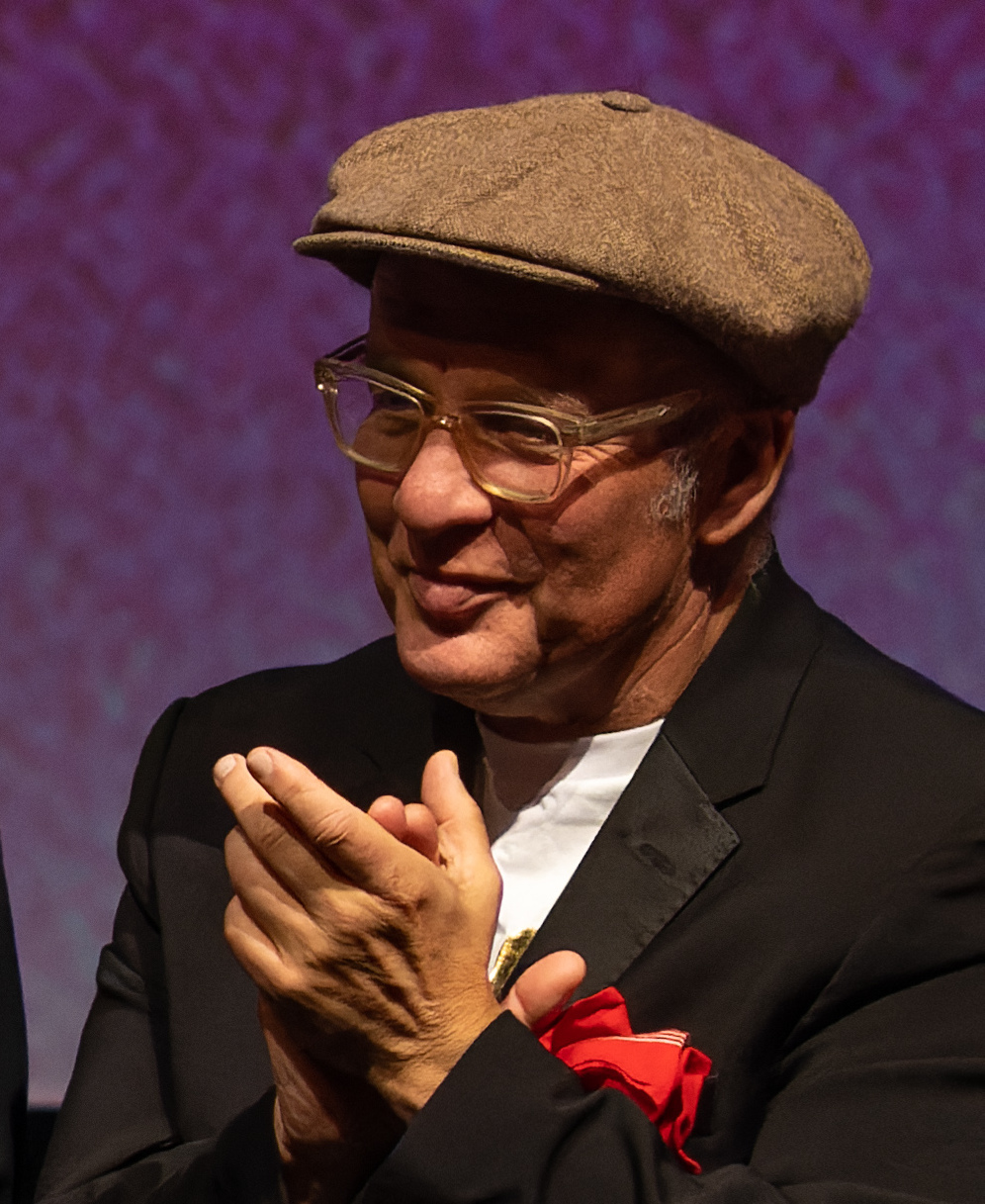
- Known for: Production Design

Mark Tildesley (born 1963) is a British production designer. Tildesley has collaborated with film directors Danny Boyle, Michael Winterbottom, Mike Leigh, Roger Michell, Paul Thomas Anderson, Cary Joji Fukunaga, and Sam Mendes. He studied theatre design at Wimbledon School of Art in the 1980s before transitioning to film work. In 1998, he won a BAFTA Cymru award for best production design for his work on House of America. He also worked with Danny Boyle as a designer for the 2012 Summer Olympics opening ceremony Isle of Wonder for which he won an Emmy Award for best art direction. In 2021, he served as production designer for the 25th James Bond film No Time to Die, replacing regular designer Dennis Gassner. In February 2026, it was announced Tildesley would serve as production designer alongside Stefania Cella and Neal Callow for Mendes' The Beatles – A Four-Film Cinematic Event, set to be released in theatres in April 2028.

== Selected filmography ==
- Blue Juice (1995) - Carl Prechezer
- House of America (1997) - Marc Evans
- The Claim (2000) - Michael Winterbottom
- 24 Hour Party People (2002) - Michael Winterbottom
- 28 Days Later (2002) - Danny Boyle
- Code 46 (2003) - Michael Winterbottom
- The Constant Gardener (2005) - Fernando Meirelles
- 28 Weeks Later (2007) - Juan Carlos Fresnadillo
- Happy-Go-Lucky (2008) - Mike Leigh
- The Boat That Rocked (2009) - Richard Curtis
- The Fifth Estate (2013) - Bill Condon
- High-Rise (2015) - Ben Wheatley
- In the Heart of the Sea (2015) - Ron Howard
- Snowden (2016) - Oliver Stone
- T2: Trainspotting (2017) - Danny Boyle
- Phantom Thread (2017) - Paul Thomas Anderson
- The Two Popes (2019) - Fernando Meirelles
- No Time to Die (2021) - Cary Joji Fukunaga
- Empire of Light (2022) - Sam Mendes
- The Banshees of Inisherin (2022) - Martin McDonagh
- F1 (2025) - Joseph Kosinski
- Jay Kelly (2025) - Noah Baumbach
- The Beatles – A Four-Film Cinematic Event (Note: Including Untitled Paul McCartney film, Untitled John Lennon film, Untitled George Harrison film and Untitled Ringo Starr film) - Sam Mendes
