= Suzie Davies =

British production designer

- Occupation: Production designer

Suzie Davies is a British production designer. She was nominated for two Academy Awards in the category Best Production Design for the films Mr. Turner and Conclave.

== Selected filmography ==
- Mr. Turner (2014; co-nominated with Charlotte Watts)
- Conclave (2024; co-nominated with Cynthia Sleiter)
