= George DeTitta Jr. =

American set decorator

- Born: February 14, 1955 (age 71); New York City, NY
- Occupation: Set decorator
- Years active: 1981–present
- Parent(s): George DeTitta Sr. (father, born 1930) June Flugel DeTitta (mother, born 1933/died 2013)

George DeTitta Jr. (born February 14, 1955) is an American set decorator. He has been nominated for two Academy Awards in the category Best Art Direction.

== Selected filmography ==
DeTitta has been nominated for two Academy Awards for Best Art Direction:

- Radio Days (1987)
- Ragtime (1981)
