= Gene Serdena =

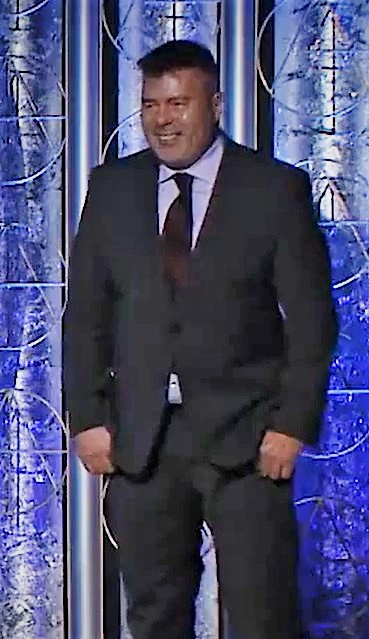
- Serdena at the Art Directors Guild 2014 award show
- Occupation: Set decorator
- Years active: 1986–present

Gene Serdena is an American set decorator. Serdena, along with production designer K. K. Barrett, was nominated for an Academy Award for Best Production Design for the 2013 film Her. He was nominated again for Best Production Design, alongside production designer Guy Hendrix Dyas, for their work in 2016 film Passengers at the 89th Academy Awards.
