= Katie Spencer =

British set decorator

- Occupation: Set decorator
- Years active: 1993–present

Katie Spencer is a British set decorator.

She has been nominated for an Academy Award for Best Production Design seven times for her set decoration in Joe Wright's films: Pride & Prejudice (2005), Atonement (2007), Anna Karenina (2012), and Darkest Hour (2017), and for the major box office successes such as Guy Ritchie's Sherlock Holmes (2009), Bill Condon's Beauty and the Beast (2017), and Greta Gerwig's Barbie (2023). She has worked many films and TV series with British art director Sarah Greenwood. Spencer is a member of the Set Decorators Society of America.

== Biography ==
Katie Spencer, born in Yorkshire, England, studied stage management at the Royal Central School of Speech and Drama in London. After several years working at the West End theatre, she transitioned to work as a freelancer for the BBC.

== Sets design ==
=== Motion pictures ===
Year	Title	Collaborators	Notes	Ref.
1997	The Governess	Sarah Greenwood		
1999	This Year's Love			
2000	Born Romantic			
2002	The Abduction Club			
2005	Pride & Prejudice			
2006	Starter for 10			
2007	Atonement			
2008	Miss Pettigrew Lives for a Day			
2009	Sherlock Holmes			
2011	Hanna			
2011	Sherlock Holmes: A Game of Shadows	Alison Harvey		
2012	Anna Karenina			
2016	Our Kind of Traitor			
2017	Beauty and the Beast			
2017	Darkest Hour	Lloyd Passfield		
2020	Rebecca			
2021	Cyrano			
2023	Barbie	Sarah Greenwood		
