= Gordon Sim =

Canadian set decorator

- Born: St. Thomas, Ontario, Canada
- Other name: Gord Sim
- Occupation: Set decorator
- Years active: 1978-present

Gordon Sim is a Canadian set decorator.

== Oscar nominations ==
Both of these are in Best Art Direction

- 75th Academy Awards-Chicago, nomination shared with John Myhre. Won.
- 82nd Academy Awards-Nine, nomination shared with John Myhre. Lost to Avatar.
- 91st Academy Awards-Mary Poppins Returns, nomination shared with John Myhre. Lost to Black Panther.

== Selected filmography ==
- Sea of Love (1989)
- The Freshman (1990)
- Deceived (1991)
- F/X2 (1991)
- Life with Mikey (1993)
- Trapped in Paradise (1994)
- Tommy Boy (1995)
- The Hurricane (1999)
- Frequency (2000)
- Chicago (2002)
- Cinderella Man (2005)
- Hairspray (2007)
- Nine (2009)
- Pirates of the Caribbean: On Stranger Tides (2011)
- X-Men: Days of Future Past (2014)
- The Great Wall (2016)
- Mary Poppins Returns (2018)
- The Little Mermaid (2023)
