= Eugenio Caballero =

Mexican production designer

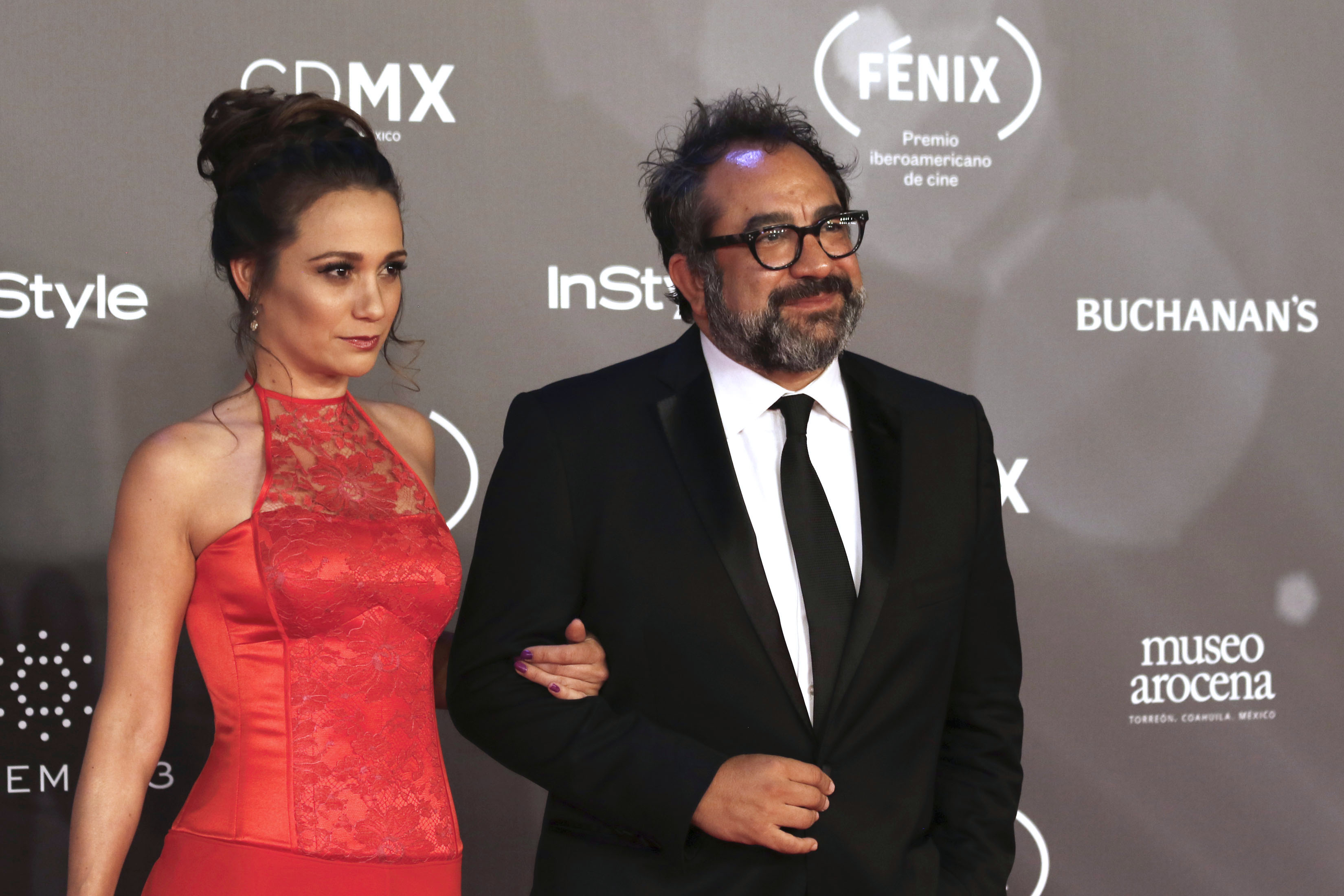
- Gabriela Zas and Eugenio Caballero
- Born: 1972 (age 53–54); Mexico City, Mexico
- Occupation: Production designer
- Years active: 1997-present

Eugenio Caballero (born 1972) is a Mexican production designer. He is best known for his work on Guillermo del Toro's film Pan's Labyrinth for which he earned an Academy Award, Ariel Award, Art Directors Guild Award, Los Angeles Film Critics Association Award as well as Goya, Satellite, and BAFTA award nominations for Best Production Design.

== Life and career ==
Caballero was raised in Mexico City. After studying the history of art and history of cinema in Florence, Italy, his career as a production designer began in Mexico, with award-winning work on music videos (MTV awards) and short films. Soon, he started to work in feature films as an assistant and a set decorator.

Mr. Caballero’s credits include near 30 films, 20 of them as both production designer and assistant set decorator. He has worked with directors Jim Jarmusch (The Limits of Control), J. A. Bayona (The Impossible, A Monster Calls), Baz Luhrmann (Romeo + Juliet), Alfonso Cuarón (Roma), Alejandro González Iñárritu (Bardo), Sebastián Cordero (Crónicas, Rabia and Europa Report), Floria Sigismondi (The Runaways), Claudia Llosa (Aloft), Fernando Eimbcke (Club Sandwich), Carlos Cuarón (Rudo y Cursi), Russell Mulcahy (Resident Evil: Extinction), among others.

His first collaboration with J.A.Bayona on The Impossible, starring Naomi Watts, Ewan McGregor and Tom Holland, earned him a Goya nomination and an Art Directors Guild nomination in 2013.

In 2014, Caballero designed the Paralympic Opening Ceremony of the 2014 Winter Olympics for director Daniele Finzi, with whom he had also collaborated with the Cirque du Soleil in the show “Luzia” in 2016.

In 2015 and 2016, he worked on the film A Monster Calls, also directed by J.A. Bayona and based on the multi awarded book by Patrick Ness, which earned him a “Goya” early this year on his third nomination to this award. He received the Gaudi Award for the same film.

Caballero has been nominated 5 times for the Ariel award — Mexico’s main film award, of which he has won twice.

He has served as a Jury member on numerous international festivals, and he is a member of the AMPAS (Academy of Motion Picture Arts and Sciences), the Mexican and Spanish film academies.

Caballero's work on Alfonso Cuarón's Roma, nabbed him nominations for an Academy Award, BAFTA Award and Critics' Choice Movie Awards for Best Production Design.
