= Sarah Greenwood =

British production designer

- Occupation: Production designer

Sarah Greenwood (born March 1960) is a British production designer.

She is known for her work on Atonement (2007), Anna Karenina (2012), and Barbie (2023).

== Early career ==
She studied at the Wimbledon College of Art and was production designer in theater for more than three years. However she was not entirely satisfied with the work, so she got a job at the BBC in the early 90s and stayed there for a while. It didn't only get her a better job, but helped in her transformation from theater to TV. She worked on designing sets for television talk show Later... with Jools Holland. Then, in the late 90s, the BBC disappeared the charge of production design, and she had to work in independent cinema.

== Production design career and awards ==
In an interview column for the Golden Globe Awards, Greenwood stated that green arsenic was used in the corridors for the film Atonement, but the director, Joe Wright, wanted Irish green for the dress that Keira Knightley was going to use in the movie. Sarah decided to give priority to the dress and change the colour she had planned for the corridors, because the dress had a risk of losing visual emphasis. She said, "Sometimes you have to be strong to win battles, and sometimes you have to know when to let go." She was not entirely convinced with the colour that the director wanted, but there are decisions that an art director must make to get the message to the viewer.

Another story that she tells is that when she went to get a production art job on a film to be made, someone said, "This project is very large. Sure you can handle it?" She had worked on huge sets, so she said "if you have the tools and enough supplies to meet the needs with a good production team, anything is possible." When she met the director, he said he was asked the same question; this made clear it was not a gender thing. "They just wanted to make sure that we all can do this," she said.

In 2017, Greenwood worked on Disney's live action version of Beauty and the Beast, directed by Bill Condon and released in March, and the biopic Darkest Hour, directed by Joe Wright; receiving Oscar nominations for both.

In 2023, Greenwood and regular collaborator Katie Spencer worked on the live action film Barbie, directed by Greta Gerwig, for which Greenwood and Spencer received their 7th Oscar nomination.

Greenwood has been nominated seven times for an Academy Award – in 2006 for Pride & Prejudice, in 2008 for Atonement, in 2010 for Sherlock Holmes, in 2013 for Anna Karenina in 2018 for both Beauty and the Beast, and Darkest Hour., and in 2024 for Barbie. In 2008, she was elected best production designer for Atonement at the 61st British Academy Film Awards, the 26th European Film Awards, and won the Art Directors Guild Award for Excellence in Period Film for the same film.

== Filmography ==
Year	Title	Production Role	Director
2005	Pride and Prejudice	Production Designer	Joe Wright
2007	Atonement	Production Designer	Joe Wright
2009	Sherlock Holmes	Production Designer	Guy Ritchie
2011	Hanna	Production Designer	Joe Wright
2011	Sherlock Holmes: A Game of Shadows	Production Designer	Guy Ritchie
2012	Anna Karenina	Production Designer	Joe Wright
2018	Beauty and the Beast	Production Designer	Bill Condon
2017	Darkest Hour	Production Designer	Joe Wright
2020	Rebecca	Production Designer	Ben Whealtey
2023	Barbie	Production Designer	Greta Gerwig
2024	Back to Black	Production Designer	Sam Taylor-Johnson
