= Lee Sandales =

English set decorator

- Born: December 1971 (age 54); Gateacre, Liverpool, England
- Education: University of Roehampton
- Occupation: Set decorator
- Years active: 1997–present
- Spouse: Mark

Lee Sandales (born December 1971) is an English set decorator. He is mostly known for his work on the films War Horse (2011), Star Wars: The Force Awakens (2015), Rogue One (2016), 1917 (2019), and Wicked (2024). Throughout his career, he has been nominated for three Academy Awards, winning for Wicked and has been nominated for four BAFTA Awards, winning two of them – in 2020 for 1917, and in 2025 for Wicked.

== Early life ==
Sandales was born in December 1971 in Liverpool and grew up in Gateacre with his parents Audrey and Charlie. He attended the local comprehensive school, before attending University of Roehampton and getting his first job. He now lives in London with his husband Mark.

== Partial filmography ==
=== As set decorator ===
- Separate Lies (2005)
- Casino Royale (2006)
- Green Zone (2010)
- Sex and the City 2 (2010)
- Blitz (2011)
- War Horse (2011)
- Wrath of the Titans (2012)
- Maleficent (2014)
- Star Wars: The Force Awakens (2015)
- Rogue One (2016)
- Solo: A Star Wars Story (2018)
- 1917 (2019)
- Dolittle (2020)
- Wicked (2024)

=== As art director ===
- Love, Honour and Obey (2000)

== Awards and nominations ==
=== Major associations ===
==== Academy Awards ====
Year	Nominated work	Category	Result	Ref.
2012	War Horse	Best Art Direction (shared with Rick Carter)	Nominated	
2020	1917	Best Production Design (shared with Dennis Gassner)	Nominated	
2025	Wicked	Best Production Design (shared with Nathan Crowley)	Won	

==== British Academy Film Awards ====
Year	Nominated work	Category	Result	Ref.
2012	War Horse	Best Production Design (shared with Rick Carter)	Nominated	
2016	Star Wars: The Force Awakens	Best Production Design (shared with Rick Carter and Darren Gilford)	Nominated	
2020	1917	Best Production Design (shared with Dennis Gassner)	Won	
2025	Wicked	Best Production Design (shared with Nathan Crowley)	Won	
