= Adam Stockhausen =

American production designer

- Education: Marquette University's Diederich College of Communication
- Occupation: production designer
- Known for: collaborations with Wes Anderson, Steven Spielberg, and Steve McQueen
- Notable work: see Filmography
- Awards: four nominations for the Academy Award for Best Production Design, winning for The Grand Budapest Hotel (2014)

Adam Stockhausen is an American production designer known for his collaborations with Wes Anderson, Steven Spielberg, and Steve McQueen. He's received four nominations for the Academy Award for Best Production Design, winning for The Grand Budapest Hotel (2014).

== Early life and education ==
Stockhausen grew up in Wauwatosa, Wisconsin and graduated with a Theater Arts degree from Marquette University's Diederich College of Communication in 1995, and a Master of Fine Arts from the Yale School of Drama in 1999.

== Career ==
Stockhausen, along with set decorator Anna Pinnock won the Academy Award for Best Production Design for the 2014 film The Grand Budapest Hotel. Previously he was nominated for the Academy Award for Best Production Design for the 2013 film 12 Years a Slave together with set decorator Alice Baker. He was also nominated for the Academy Award for Best Production Design for the 2015 film Bridge of Spies along with set decorators Bernhard Henrich and Rena DeAngelo.

== Filmography ==
As production designer

Year	Film	Director	Notes
2008	8	Mira Nair	Segment: "How Can It Be?"
2010	Every Day	Richard Levine	
2010	The Switch	Will Speck; Josh Gordon	
2010	My Soul to Take	Wes Craven	
2011	Scream 4	Wes Craven	
2012	Moonrise Kingdom	Wes Anderson	
2013	12 Years a Slave	Steve McQueen	
2014	The Grand Budapest Hotel	Wes Anderson	
2014	While We're Young	Noah Baumbach	
2015	Bridge of Spies	Steven Spielberg	
2018	Ready Player One	Steven Spielberg	
2018	Isle of Dogs	Wes Anderson	Animated film with Paul Harrod
2018	American Dharma	Errol Morris	Documentary
2018	Widows	Steve McQueen	
2021	The French Dispatch	Wes Anderson	
2021	West Side Story	Steven Spielberg	
2023	Asteroid City	Wes Anderson	
2023	Indiana Jones and the Dial of Destiny	James Mangold	
2023	The Wonderful Story of Henry Sugar	Wes Anderson	Short film
2024	Blitz	Steve McQueen	
2025	The Phoenician Scheme	Wes Anderson	
2026	Disclosure Day	Steven Spielberg	

As art director

Year	Film	Director	Notes
2003	Ash Tuesday	Jim Hershleder	
2004	Alfie	Charles Shyer	assistant art director
2005	The Producers	Susan Stroman	assistant art director
2007	Across the Universe	Julie Taymor	assistant art director
2007	The Darjeeling Limited	Wes Anderson	supervising art director
2007	Margot at the Wedding	Noah Baumbach	
2008	Synecdoche, New York	Charlie Kaufman	
2009	State of Play	Kevin MacDonald	

== Awards and nominations ==
Year	Award	Category	Project	Result	Ref.
2013	Academy Award	Best Production Design	12 Years a Slave	Nominated	
2014	Academy Award	Best Production Design	The Grand Budapest Hotel	Won	
2015	Academy Award	Best Production Design	Bridge of Spies	Nominated	
2021	Academy Award	Best Production Design	West Side Story	Nominated	
