= Anna Lynch-Robinson =

Set decorator and art director

- Other name: Anna Lynch Robinson
- Occupations: Art director and set decorator
- Years active: 2001–present

Anna Lynch-Robinson is a set decorator and art director who was nominated at the 85th Academy Awards for her work on the sets on the film Les Misérables. This was in the category of Best Production Design. She shared her nomination with Eve Stewart. She is the sister of Kit Lynch-Robinson, best known as the director on The Grand Tour and Top Gear.

== Selected filmography ==
- Bridget Jones: The Edge of Reason (2004)
- Revolver (2005)
- In Bruges (2008)
- An Education (2009)
- Made in Dagenham (2010)
- Les Misérables (2012)
- Muppets Most Wanted (2014)
- Alice Through the Looking Glass (2016)
- Wonder Woman (2017)
- Bohemian Rhapsody (2018)
- Wonder Woman 1984 (2020)
- The 355 (2022)
- Matilda the Musical (2022)
- Here (2024)
- Sonic the Hedgehog 3 (2024)
- Black Bag (2025)
