= Rena DeAngelo =

American set decorator

- Occupation: Set decorator
- Years active: 1995-present

Rena DeAngelo is an American set decorator. She was nominated at the 88th Academy Awards in the category Best Production Design for her work on the film Bridge of Spies. Her nomination was shared with Adam Stockhausen and Bernhard Henrich. DeAngelo also won an Primetime Emmy Award for the television series Mad Men in the category of Outstanding Art Direction for a Single-Camera Series.

Raised in Nutley, New Jersey, DeAngelo graduated from Nutley High School in 1984.
