= Jan Pascale =

American set decorator

- Occupation: Set decorator
- Years active: 1982-present

Jan Pascale is an American set decorator who has won an Academy Award and a Primetime Emmy Award . She has worked on over 50 different TV shows and films since 1982.

She won her Emmy 2001 for the TV show Boston Public.

She was nominated at the 78th Academy Awards in the category of Best Art Direction for George Clooney's 2005 historical drama film Good Night, and Good Luck, of which she shared her nomination with James D. Bissell. In 2020, Pascale won in the same category with Donald Graham Burt for David Fincher's black-and-white biographical drama film Mank at the 93rd Academy Awards.

== Personal life ==
Pascale is married to her wife Louise.
