= Art Directors Guild Award for Excellence in Production Design for a Contemporary Film =

Annual US film award

- Previous: Art Directors Guild Award for Excellence in Production Design for a Feature Film
- Presented by: Art Directors Guild
- Established: 2000
- Currently held by: Florencia Martin for One Battle After Another (2025)

The Art Directors Guild Award for Excellence in Production Design for a Contemporary Film is one of the annual awards given by the Art Directors Guild starting from 2000.

== Winners and nominees ==
=== 2000s ===
| Year | Film | Production Designer(s) |
|---|---|---|
| 2000 (5th) | Chocolat | David Gropman |
| 2000 (5th) | Almost Famous | Clay A. Griffith |
| 2000 (5th) | Billy Elliot | Maria Djurkovic |
| 2000 (5th) | The Perfect Storm | William Sandell |
| 2000 (5th) | Wonder Boys | Jeannine Oppewall |
| 2001 (6th) | Amélie | Aline Bonetto |
| 2001 (6th) | Black Hawk Down | Arthur Max |
| 2001 (6th) | Ocean's Eleven | Philip Messina |
| 2001 (6th) | The Royal Tenenbaums | David Wasco |
| 2001 (6th) | The Shipping News | David Gropman |
| 2002 (7th) | Catch Me If You Can | Jeannine Oppewall |
| 2002 (7th) | The Bourne Identity | Dan Weil |
| 2002 (7th) | The Hours | Maria Djurkovic |
| 2002 (7th) | One Hour Photo | Tom Foden |
| 2002 (7th) | Panic Room | Arthur Max |
| 2003 (8th) | Mystic River | Henry Bumstead |
| 2003 (8th) | Kill Bill: Volume 1 | David Wasco |
| 2003 (8th) | Lost in Translation | K. K. Barrett |
| 2003 (8th) | Something's Gotta Give | Jon Hutman |
| 2003 (8th) | Under the Tuscan Sun | Stephen McCabe |
| 2004 (9th) | The Terminal | Alex McDowell |
| 2004 (9th) | Collateral | David Wasco |
| 2004 (9th) | Eternal Sunshine of the Spotless Mind | Dan Leigh |
| 2004 (9th) | The Life Aquatic with Steve Zissou | Mark Friedberg |
| 2004 (9th) | Million Dollar Baby | Henry Bumstead |
| 2005 (10th) | Walk the Line | David J. Bomba |
| 2005 (10th) | The Constant Gardener | Mark Tildesley |
| 2005 (10th) | Crash | Laurence Bennett |
| 2005 (10th) | Jarhead | Dennis Gassner |
| 2005 (10th) | Syriana | Dan Weil |
| 2006 (11th) | Casino Royale | Peter Lamont |
| 2006 (11th) | Babel | Brigitte Broch |
| 2006 (11th) | The Da Vinci Code | Allan Cameron |
| 2006 (11th) | The Departed | Kristi Zea |
| 2006 (11th) | The Queen | Alan MacDonald |
| 2007 (12th) | No Country for Old Men | Jess Gonchor |
| 2007 (12th) | The Bourne Ultimatum | Peter Wenham |
| 2007 (12th) | The Diving Bell and the Butterfly | Michel Eric |
| 2007 (12th) | The Kite Runner | Carlos Conti |
| 2007 (12th) | Michael Clayton | Kevin Thompson |
| 2008 (13th) | Slumdog Millionaire | Mark Digby |
| 2008 (13th) | Burn After Reading | Jess Gonchor |
| 2008 (13th) | Gran Torino | James J. Murakami |
| 2008 (13th) | Quantum of Solace | Dennis Gassner |
| 2008 (13th) | The Wrestler | Timothy Grimes |
| 2009 (14th) | The Hurt Locker | Karl Júlíusson |
| 2009 (14th) | Angels & Demons | Allan Cameron |
| 2009 (14th) | The Hangover | Bill Brzeski |
| 2009 (14th) | The Lovely Bones | Naomi Shohan |
| 2009 (14th) | Up in the Air | Steve Saklad |

=== 2010s ===
| Year | Film | Production Designer(s) |
|---|---|---|
| 2010 (15th) | Black Swan | Thérèse DePrez |
| 2010 (15th) | 127 Hours | Suttirat Larlarb |
| 2010 (15th) | The Fighter | Judy Becker |
| 2010 (15th) | The Social Network | Donald Graham Burt |
| 2010 (15th) | The Town | Sharon Seymour |
| 2011 (16th) | The Girl with the Dragon Tattoo | Donald Graham Burt |
| 2011 (16th) | Bridesmaids | Jefferson Sage |
| 2011 (16th) | The Descendants | Jane Ann Stewart |
| 2011 (16th) | Drive | Beth Mickle |
| 2011 (16th) | Extremely Loud and Incredibly Close | K. K. Barrett |
| 2012 (17th) | Skyfall | Dennis Gassner |
| 2012 (17th) | The Best Exotic Marigold Hotel | Alan MacDonald |
| 2012 (17th) | Flight | Nelson Coates |
| 2012 (17th) | The Impossible | Eugenio Caballero |
| 2012 (17th) | Zero Dark Thirty | Jeremy Hindle |
| 2013 (18th) | Her | K. K. Barrett |
| 2013 (18th) | August: Osage County | David Gropman |
| 2013 (18th) | Blue Jasmine | Santo Loquasto |
| 2013 (18th) | Captain Phillips | Paul Kirby |
| 2013 (18th) | The Wolf of Wall Street | Bob Shaw |
| 2014 (19th) | Birdman or (The Unexpected Virtue of Ignorance) | Kevin Thompson |
| 2014 (19th) | American Sniper | James J. Murakami and Charisse Cardenas |
| 2014 (19th) | Foxcatcher | Jess Gonchor |
| 2014 (19th) | Gone Girl | Donald Graham Burt |
| 2014 (19th) | Nightcrawler | Kevin Kavanaugh |
| 2015 (20th) | The Martian | Arthur Max |
| 2015 (20th) | Ex Machina | Mark Digby |
| 2015 (20th) | Joy | Judy Becker |
| 2015 (20th) | Sicario | Patrice Vermette |
| 2015 (20th) | Spectre | Dennis Gassner |
| 2016 (21st) | La La Land | David Wasco |
| 2016 (21st) | Hell or High Water | Tom Duffield |
| 2016 (21st) | Lion | Chris Kennedy |
| 2016 (21st) | Manchester by the Sea | Ruth De Jong |
| 2016 (21st) | Nocturnal Animals | Shane Valentino |
| 2017 (22nd) | Logan | François Audouy |
| 2017 (22nd) | Downsizing | Stefania Cella |
| 2017 (22nd) | Get Out | Rusty Smith |
| 2017 (22nd) | Lady Bird | Chris Jones |
| 2017 (22nd) | Three Billboards Outside Ebbing, Missouri | Inbal Weinberg |
| 2018 (23rd) | Crazy Rich Asians | Nelson Coates |
| 2018 (23rd) | Mission: Impossible – Fallout | Peter Wenham |
| 2018 (23rd) | A Quiet Place | Jeffrey Beecroft |
| 2018 (23rd) | A Star Is Born | Karen Murphy |
| 2018 (23rd) | Welcome to Marwen | Stefan Dechant |
| 2019 (24th) | Parasite | Lee Ha-jun |
| 2019 (24th) | A Beautiful Day in the Neighborhood | Jade Healy |
| 2019 (24th) | John Wick: Chapter 3 – Parabellum | Kevin Kavanaugh |
| 2019 (24th) | Knives Out | David Crank |
| 2019 (24th) | Us | Ruth De Jong |

=== 2020s ===
| Year | Film | Production Designer(s) |
|---|---|---|
| 2020 (25th) | Da 5 Bloods | Wynn Thomas |
| 2020 (25th) | I'm Thinking of Ending Things | Molly Hughes |
| 2020 (25th) | Palm Springs | Jason Kisvardy |
| 2020 (25th) | The Prom | Jamie Walker McCall |
| 2020 (25th) | Promising Young Woman | Michael T. Perry |
| 2021 (26th) | No Time to Die | Mark Tildesley |
| 2021 (26th) | Candyman | Cara Brower |
| 2021 (26th) | Don't Look Up | Clayton Hartley |
| 2021 (26th) | In the Heights | Nelson Coates |
| 2021 (26th) | The Lost Daughter | Inbal Weinberg |
| 2022 (27th) | Glass Onion: A Knives Out Mystery | Rick Heinrichs |
| 2022 (27th) | Bardo, False Chronicle of a Handful of Truths | Eugenio Caballero |
| 2022 (27th) | Bullet Train | David Scheunemann |
| 2022 (27th) | Tár | Marco Bittner Rosser |
| 2022 (27th) | Top Gun: Maverick | Jeremy Hindle |
| 2023 (28th) | Saltburn | Suzie Davies |
| 2023 (28th) | Beau Is Afraid | Fiona Crombie |
| 2023 (28th) | John Wick: Chapter 4 | Kevin Kavanaugh |
| 2023 (28th) | The Killer | Donald Graham Burt |
| 2023 (28th) | Mission: Impossible – Dead Reckoning Part One | Gary Freeman |
| 2024 (29th) | Conclave | Suzie Davies |
| 2024 (29th) | Civil War | Caty Maxey |
| 2024 (29th) | Emilia Pérez | Emmanuelle Duplay |
| 2024 (29th) | The Substance | Stanislas Reydellet |
| 2024 (29th) | Twisters | Patrick M. Sullivan |
| 2025 (30th) | One Battle After Another | Florencia Martin |
| 2025 (30th) | Bugonia | James Price |
| 2025 (30th) | F1 | Ben Munro and Mark Tildesley |
| 2025 (30th) | Mission: Impossible – The Final Reckoning | Gary Freeman |
| 2025 (30th) | Wake Up Dead Man: A Knives Out Mystery | Rick Heinrichs |
