= Art Directors Guild Award for Excellence in Production Design for a One-Hour Contemporary Single-Camera Series =

Television award

The Art Directors Guild Award for Outstanding Production Design for a One-Hour Contemporary Single-Camera Series is an award handed out annually by the Art Directors Guild. It was introduced at the Art Directors Guilds' 18th annual honors, in 2014. After all television programs were combined for the first four ceremonies, including miniseries for the first, the category narrowed its honorees to single-camera series. From the fifth ceremony until the 13th, the category remained for all single-camera series, before narrowing, again, to honor single-camera series with a length of one-hour. Finally, in 2015, the category re-classified to its current iteration.

== Winners and nominations ==
=== 1990s ===
Excellence in Production Design Award - Television

| Year | Program | Episode(s) | Nominees | Network |
|---|---|---|---|---|
1996 (1st)
| 1996 (1st) | Star Trek: Deep Space Nine | | Herman F. Zimmerman (production designer), Randall McIlvain (art director) | Syndication |
| 1996 (1st) | Frasier | | Roy Christopher (production designer), Wendell Johnson | NBC |
| 1996 (1st) | Mrs. Santa Claus | | Hub Braden (production designer), Mary Dodson (art director) | CBS |
| 1996 (1st) | NYPD Blue | | Richard C. Hankins (production designer), Alan E. Muraoka (art director), Lauren Crasco (assistant art director) | ABC |
| 1996 (1st) | The Summer of Ben Tyler | | Jan Scott (production designer), Tim Eckel (art director) | CBS |
1997 (2nd)
| 1997 (2nd) | Brooklyn South | | Paul Eads (production designer), Lee Mayman (art director) | CBS |
| 1997 (2nd) | Babylon 5 | | John Iacovelli (production designer), Mark Walters (art director), Julie Aldedice-Rae (assistant art director) | PTEN |
| 1997 (2nd) | Frasier | | Roy Christopher (production designer), Richard Fernandez (art director) | NBC |
| 1997 (2nd) | Nothing Sacred | | Michael Baugh (production designer), Cate Bangs (art director) | ABC |
| 1997 (2nd) | Star Trek: Voyager | | Richard James (production designer); Leslie Parsons, Louise Dorton (art directors) | UPN |
1998 (3rd)
| 1998 (3rd) | The X-Files | | Corey Kaplan (production designer); Sandy Getzler, Lauren Polizzi (art directors); Kevin Kavanaugh (assistant art director) | Fox |
| 1998 (3rd) | Buddy Faro | | Tom Walsh (production designer), Kim Hix (art director) | CBS |
| 1998 (3rd) | Seven Days | | Carol Winstead Wood (production designer); Eric Orbom, Gregory A. Weimerskirch (art directors); Beala Neel (assistant art director) | UPN |
| 1998 (3rd) | Sports Night | | Tom Azzari (production designer) | ABC |
| 1998 (3rd) | Star Trek: Voyager | | Richard James (production designer), Louise Dorton (art director) | UPN |
1999 (4th)
| 1999 (4th) | The West Wing | "Pilot" | Jon Hutman (production designer), Tony Fanning (art directors) | NBC |
| 1999 (4th) | The Magnificent Seven | | Jerry Wanek (production designer), John Bucklin (art director) | CBS |
| 1999 (4th) | Roswell | | Vincent Jefferds (production designer), Dawn Snyder (art director) | The WB |
| 1999 (4th) | Star Trek: Voyager | | Richard James (production designer), Louise Dorton (art director) | UPN |
| 1999 (4th) | The X-Files | | Corey Kaplan (production designer); Sandy Getzler, Lauren Polizzi (art directors); Steve Miller (assistant art director) | Fox |

=== 2000s ===
Excellence in Production Design Award - Television, Single Camera Series

| Year | Program | Episode(s) | Nominees | Network |
|---|---|---|---|---|
2000 (5th)
| 2000 (5th) | The X-Files | | Corey Kaplan (production designer); Sandy Getzler, Lauren Polizzi (art directors); Steven Miller (assistant art director) | Fox |
| 2000 (5th) | Boston Public | "Chapter One" | Paul Eads (production designer), Mindy Roffman (art director) | Fox |
| 2000 (5th) | City of Angels | "Pilot" | Michael Baugh (production designer), Ken Creber (art director) | CBS |
| 2000 (5th) | Judging Amy | | Michael Mayer (production designer), Scott Meehan (art director) | CBS |
| 2000 (5th) | Star Trek: Voyager | | Richard James (production designer), Louise Dorton (art director) | UPN |
2001 (6th)
| 2001 (6th) | Six Feet Under | "Pilot" | Marcia Hinds (production designer), Tom Taylor (art director) | HBO |
| 2001 (6th) | 24 | "12:00 a.m. – 1:00 a.m." | Carlos Barbosa (production designer), Tim Beach (art director) | Fox |
| 2001 (6th) | Alias | "Reckoning" | Scott Chambliss (production designer), Cece De Stefano (art director) | ABC |
| 2001 (6th) | Dark Angel | | Jerry Wanek (production designer); Daniel T. Hermansen, John E. Marcynuk (art directors); Douglas A. Girling, Vivien M. Nishi (assistant art directors) | Fox |
| 2001 (6th) | The West Wing | | Kenneth Hardy (production designer) | NBC |
2002 (7th)
| 2002 (7th) | Alias | "Cipher" | Scott Chambliss (production designer), Cece De Stefano (art director) | ABC |
| 2002 (7th) | American Dreams | "Pilot" | Philip Toolin (production designer), Matthew Budgeon (art director), Laura Hopkins (assistant art director) | NBC |
| 2002 (7th) | Crossing Jordan | "One Twelve (Upon the Wasted Building)" | Curtis Schnell (production designer), Daniel Vivanco (art director), Matthew Conrad (assistant art director) | NBC |
| 2002 (7th) | Push, Nevada | "Pilot" | Edward T. McAvoy (production designer), Alan Muraoka (art director) | ABC |
| 2002 (7th) | The Shield | "Pilot" | James Newport (production designer), William J. Durrell Jr. (art director) | FX |
2003 (8th)
| 2003 (8th) | Carnivàle | "Milfay" | Bernt Amadeus Capra (production designer), Jeremy Cassells (art director) | HBO |
| 2003 (8th) | 24 | | Joseph Hodges (production designer) | Fox |
| 2003 (8th) | Alias | | Scott Chambliss (production designer), Cece De Stefano (art director) | ABC |
| 2003 (8th) | CSI: Crime Scene Investigation | | Richard Berg (production designer), Tim Eckel (art director), Debra Wilbur (assistant art director) | CBS |
| 2003 (8th) | Las Vegas | | Peter Politanoff (production designer), Tomas Voth (art director) | NBC |

Excellence in Production Design Award - Single Camera Television Series

| Year | Program | Episode(s) | Nominees | Network |
|---|---|---|---|---|
2004 (9th)
| 2004 (9th) | Desperate Housewives | "Ah, But Underneath" | Tom Walsh (production designer); Kim Hix, P. Erik Carlson (art directors); Steve Samanen (assistant art director) | ABC |
| 2004 (9th) | Alias | "Legacy" | Scott Chambliss (production designer), Cece De Stefano (art director) | ABC |
| 2004 (9th) | Cold Case | "Factory Girls" | Corey Kaplan (production designer), Sandy Getzler (art director) | CBS |
| 2004 (9th) | Jack & Bobby | "An Innocent Man" | Dina Lipton (production designer), Marc Dabe (assistant art director) | The WB |
| 2004 (9th) | Lost | "Pilot" | Mark Worthington (production designer), Christina Wilson (art director), Ray Yamagata (assistant art director) | ABC |
2005 (10th)
| 2005 (10th) | Rome | "The Stolen Eagle" | Joseph Bennett (production designer); Domenico Sica, Carlo Serafin, Dominic Hyman (art directors); Daniela Giovannoni (assistant art director) | HBO |
| 2005 (10th) | Deadwood | "Requiem for a Gleet" | Maria Caso (production designer); James J. Murakami, David Potts (art directors); Michael J. Kelley (assistant art director) | HBO |
| 2005 (10th) | Desperate Housewives | "They Ask Me Why I Believe You" | Tom Walsh (production designer), P. Erik Carlson (art directors), Steve Samanen (assistant art director) | ABC |
| 2005 (10th) | Las Vegas | "The Real McCoy" | Richard Toyon (production designer), Scott Meehan (supervising art director), Tom Frohling (art director) | NBC |
| 2005 (10th) | Lost | "Orientation" | James H. Spencer (production designer), William F. Matthews (art director) | ABC |
2006 (11th)
| 2006 (11th) | Ugly Betty | "The Box and the Bunny" | Mark Worthington (production designer); Jim Wallis, Kathleen Widomski (art directors); Charles E. McCarry (art director - New York); Wing Lee (assistant art director - New York) | ABC |
| 2006 (11th) | 24 | "Day 5: 7:00 a.m. – 8:00 a.m." | Joseph Hodges (production designer), Bruce Robert Hill (art director) | Fox |
| 2006 (11th) | Deadwood | "True Colors" | Maria Caso (production designer), David Potts (art director), Michael J. Kelley (assistant art director) | HBO |
| 2006 (11th) | Heroes | "Six Months Ago" | Ruth Ammon (production designer), Michael Budge (art director), Matthew C. Jacobs (art director) | NBC |
| 2006 (11th) | Studio 60 on the Sunset Strip | "Pilot" | Carlos Barbosa (production designer), Tim Beach (art director) | NBC |
2007 (12th)
| 2007 (12th) | Mad Men | "Shoot" | Dan Bishop (production designer), Christopher Brown (art director) | AMC |
| 2007 (12th) | Heroes | "Five Years Gone" | Ruth Ammon (production designer); Matthew C. Jacobs, Tom Taylor (art directors) | NBC |
| 2007 (12th) | Lost | "Through the Looking Glass" | Zack Grobler (production designer); Scott Cobb, Andrew Murdock (art directors) | ABC |
| 2007 (12th) | Pushing Daisies | "Pie-lette" | Michael Wylie (production designer), William J. Durrell Jr. (art director) | ABC |
| 2007 (12th) | Ugly Betty | "East Side Story" | Mark Worthington (production designer), Jim Wallis (art director) | ABC |

Excellence in Production Design Award - One Hour Single Camera Television Series

| Year | Program | Episode(s) | Nominees | Network |
|---|---|---|---|---|
2008 (13th)
| 2008 (13th) | Mad Men | "The Jet Set" | Dan Bishop (production designer), Christopher Brown (art director), Shanna Starzyk (assistant art director), Camille M. Bratkowski (set designer), Robin Richesson (graphic designer) | AMC |
| 2008 (13th) | Pushing Daisies | "Bzzzzzzzzz!" | Michael Wylie (production designer); Kenneth J. Creber (art director); Phil Dagort, Jeff Ozimek (set designers); Kim Papazian (graphic designer); Halina Siwolop (set decorator) | ABC |
| 2008 (13th) | True Blood | "Burning House of Love" | Suzuki Ingerslev (production designer); Catherine Smith (art director); Macie Vener (assistant art director); Dan Caplan (storyboard artist); Daniel Bradford (set designer); Cindy Carr, Rusty Lipscomb (set decorators) | HBO |
| 2008 (13th) | The Tudors | "Everything Is Beautiful" | Tom Conroy (production designer); Colman Corish, Carmel Nugent (art directors); Melanie Downes (standby art director); Liz Colbert (assistant art director); Anna Rackard (set designer); Pilar Valencia (graphic designer); Jenny Oman (set decorator) | Showtime |
| 2008 (13th) | Ugly Betty | "When Betty Met YETI" | Mark Worthington (production designer); Charles McCarry (art director); Larry W. Brown, Eric Bryant (assistant art directors); Jim Wallis (set designer); Robert Bernard (scenic graphic artist); Alex Gorodetsky (charge scenic artist); Archie D'Amico, Rich Devine (set decorators) | ABC |
2009 (14th)
| 2009 (14th) | Mad Men | "Souvenir" | Dan Bishop (production designer), Christopher Brown (art director), Shanna Starzyk (assistant art director), Robin Richesson (illustrator), Camille M. Bratkowski (set designer), Geoffrey Mandel (graphic designer), Amy Wells (set decorator) | AMC |
| 2009 (14th) | Glee | "Pilot" | Mark Hutman (production designer), Christopher Brown (art director), Camille M. Bratkowski (set designer), Barbara Munch (set decorator) | Fox |
| 2009 (14th) | Pushing Daisies | "Kerplunk" | Michael Wylie (production designer); Kenneth J. Creber (art director); Phil Dagort, Jeff Ozimek (set designers); Kim Papazian (graphic designer); Halina Siwolop (set decorator) | ABC |
| 2009 (14th) | True Blood | "Never Let Me Go" | Suzuki Ingerslev (production designer), Catherine Smith (art director), Macie Vener (assistant art director), Daniel Bradford (set designer), Laura Richarz (set decorators) | HBO |
| 2009 (14th) | Ugly Betty | "When Betty Met YETI" | Mark Worthington (production designer); Charles McCarry (art director); Larry W. Brown, Eric Bryant (assistant art directors); Robert Bernard (graphic designer); Alex Gorodetsky (scenic artist); Rich Devine (set decorator) | ABC |

=== 2010s ===
| Year | Program | Episode(s) | Nominees | Network |
|---|---|---|---|---|
2010 (15th)
| 2010 (15th) | Mad Men | "Public Relations" | Dan Bishop (production designer), Christopher Brown (art director), Shanna Starzyk (assistant art director), Camille M. Bratkowski (set designer), Geoffrey Mandel (graphic designer), Claudette Didul (set decorator) | AMC |
| 2010 (15th) | 24 | "Day 8: 4:00 p.m. – 5:00 p.m." | Carlos Barbosa (production designer); Carlos Osorio (art director); Amy Maier (assistant art director); Marco Miehe, Ron Yates, Cameron Birnie (set designers); Adam Tankell (graphic designer); Cloudia Rebar (set decorator) | Fox |
| 2010 (15th) | Glee | "Britney/Brittany" | Mark Hutman (production designer), Michael Rizzo (art director), Timothy M. Earls (set designer), Jason Sweers (graphic designer), Barbara Munch (set decorator) | Fox |
| 2010 (15th) | True Blood | "Trouble" | Suzuki Ingerslev (production designer); Catherine Smith (art director); Macie Vener (assistant art director); Daniel Bradford (set designer); Robert Greenfield, Laura Richarz (set decorators) | HBO |
| 2010 (15th) | The Tudors | "Sixth and the Final Wife" | Tom Conroy (production designer); Colman Corish (art director); Carmel Nugent (assistant art director); Briana Hegarty, Brendan Rankin, Lesley Oakley (set designer); Annie Atkins (graphic designer); Crispian Sallis (set decorator) | Showtime |

Excellence in Production Design Award - Episode of a One Hour Single-Camera Television Series

| Year | Program | Episode(s) | Nominees | Network |
|---|---|---|---|---|
2011 (16th)
| 2011 (16th) | Boardwalk Empire | "21" | Bill Groom (production designer); Charley Beal, Adam Scher (art directors); Emily Beck, Larry M. Gruber (assistant art directors); Ted Haigh (graphic designer); Jon Ringbom (scenic artist); Carol Silverman (set decorator) | HBO |
| 2011 (16th) | American Horror Story: Murder House | "Murder House" | Mark Worthington (production designer); Edward L. Rubin (art director); Kenneth A. Larson (set designer); Robert Bernard, Ellen Brill (set decorators) | FX |
| 2011 (16th) | Game of Thrones | "A Golden Crown" | Gemma Jackson (production designer); Thomas Brown, Paul Inglis, Tom McCullagh (art directors); Ashleigh Jeffers (assistant art director); Heather Greenlees (set designer); Kimberley Pope (illustrator); Jim Stanes (graphic designer); Rohan Harris (scenic artist); William Simpson (storyboard artist); Richard Roberts (set decorator) | HBO |
| 2011 (16th) | Pan Am | "Pilot" | Bob Shaw (production designer); Adam Scher (art director); John Pollard (assistant art director); Ruth Falco, Rumiko Ishii (set designers); Gary Cergol (graphic designer); Ginger Ingram LaBella (graphic artist); Liz Bonaventura (scenic artist); Jacqueline Jacobson Scarfo (set decorator) | ABC |
| 2011 (16th) | The Playboy Club | "The Scarlet Bunny" | Scott P. Murphy (production designer); Gary Baugh (art director); Jonathan Arkin, Stephen Morahan (assistant art directors); David Tennenbaum (set designer); Dorothy Street (graphic designer); Beauchamp Fontaine, Tricia Schneider (set decorators) | NBC |
2012 (17th)
| 2012 (17th) | Game of Thrones | "The Ghost of Harrenhal" | Gemma Jackson (production designer); Heather Greenlees, Ashleigh Jeffers, Tom McCullagh, Andy Thomson, Frank Walsh (art directors); Sara-Jo Baugh (assistant art director); Brendan Rankin (set designer); Kimberley Pope (illustrator); Michael Eaton (graphic designer); Rohan Harris (scenic artist); Tina Jones (set decorator) | HBO |
| 2012 (17th) | Boardwalk Empire | "Resolution" | Bill Groom (production designer); Adam Scher (art director); Emily Beck, Larry M. Gruber, Dan Kuchar, Miguel Lopez-Castillo, Barbara Matis (assistant art directors); Jan Jericho (illustrator); Ted Haigh (graphic designer); Jon Ringbom (scenic artist); Carol Silverman (set decorator) | HBO |
| 2012 (17th) | Downton Abbey | "Christmas at Downton Abbey" | Donal Woods (production designer), Charmian Adams (supervising art director), Mark Kebby (art director), Philippa Broadhurst (standby art director), Judy Farr (set decorator) | PBS |
| 2012 (17th) | Homeland | "The Choice" | John D. Kretschmer (production designer), Geoffrey S. Grimsman (art director), Summer Eubanks (set decorator), Stephan Beck (set designer), Luci Wilson (assistant set decorator), Tiffany Apple Keenan (graphic designer), Alton McClellan (scenic artist) | Showtime |
| 2012 (17th) | The Newsroom | "We Just Decided To" | Richard Hoover (production designer), Jeff Schoen (art director), Martin Charles (graphic designer), Sandy Struth (set decorator) | HBO |
2013 (18th)
| 2013 (18th) | Game of Thrones | "Valar Dohaeris" | Gemma Jackson (production designer); Christina Moore (supervising art director - Morocco); Andy Thomson (supervising art director); Heather Greenlees, Ashleigh Jeffers, Tom Still (art directors); Mark Lowry, Brendan Rankin, Caireen Todd (assistant art directors); Max Berman, Steve Summersgill (concept artists); Michael Eaton (graphic designer); Rohan Harris (scenic artist); William Simpson (storyboard artist); Rob Cameron (set decorator) | HBO |
| 2013 (18th) | Boardwalk Empire | "The Old Ship of Zion" | Bill Groom (production designer); Adam Scher (art director); Emily Beck, Larry M. Gruber, Dan Kuchar, Neil Prince (assistant art directors); Jan Jericho (illustrator); Ariel Poster (graphic artist); Ted Haigh (graphic designer); Jon Ringbom (scenic artist); Carol Silverman (set decorator) | HBO |
| 2013 (18th) | Breaking Bad | "Felina" | Mark S. Freeborn (production designer); Paula Dal Santo (art director); Billy W. Ray (assistant art director); Derrick Ballard, Derek Jensen, Gregory G. Sandoval (set designer); JoAnna Maes-Corlew (graphic designer); Michael Flowers (set decorator) | AMC |
| 2013 (18th) | Downton Abbey | "Episode Seven" | Donal Woods (production designer); Charmian Adams, Mark Kebby (art directors); Chantelle Valentine (assistant art director); Gina Cromwell (set decorator) | PBS |
| 2013 (18th) | Mad Men | "The Better Half" | Dan Bishop (production designer), Christopher Brown (art director), Shanna Starzyk (assistant art director), Evan Regester (graphic designer), Camille M. Bratkowski (set designer), Claudette Didul (set decorator) | AMC |

Excellence in Production Design Award - One-Hour Contemporary Single-Camera Television Series

| Year | Program | Episode(s) | Nominees | Network |
|---|---|---|---|---|
2014 (19th)
| 2014 (19th) | True Detective | "The Locked Room", "Form and Void" | Alex DiGerlando (production designer); Tim Beach, Mara LePere-Schloop (art directors); Sophie Kosofsky (assistant art director); Nicole Reed LeFevre, Molly Mikula, Walter Schneider, Trinh Vu (set designers); Kristin Lekki (graphic designer); Rick Broderman, Paul Stanwyck (scenic artists); Cynthia Anne Slagter (set decorator) | HBO |
| 2014 (19th) | Homeland | "The Drone Queen" | John D. Kretschmer (production designer); Rick Dennis, Guy Potgieter (art directors); Ross Jenkin, Steven M. Saylor, Lisa Van Velden (set designers); Kate Hilson, Paula Jones (graphic designers); Andrew McCarthy (set decorator) | Showtime |
| 2014 (19th) | House of Cards | "Chapter 18" | Steve Arnold (production designer); Halina Gebarowicz (art director); E. David Cosier, Kate Dougherty (set designers); Eleni Diamantopoulos (graphic designer); Francesca Gerlach (scenic artist); Jim Nealey (storyboard artist); Tiffany Zappulla (set decorator) | Netflix |
| 2014 (19th) | Justified | "A Murder of Crowes", "Wrong Roads", "The Toll" | Dave Blass (production designer), Oana Bogdan Miller (art director), Melody Harrop (set designer), Shauna Aronson (set decorator) | FX |
| 2014 (19th) | The Newsroom | "Boston", "Main Justice", "Contempt" | Karen Steward (production designer); Chikako Suzuki (art director); Jean Harter, Anshuman Prasad (set designers); Robert Bernard, Martin Charles (graphic designers); Kevin Mahoney (scenic artist); Sandy Struth (set decorator) | HBO |
2015 (20th)
| 2015 (20th) | House of Cards | "Chapter 29", "Chapter 36" | Steve Arnold (production designer); Halina Gebarowicz (art director); Elizabeth Flaherty (assistant art director); Kate Dougherty, Darrell L. Wight (set designers); Eleni Diamantopoulos (graphic designer); Francesca Gerlach (scenic artist); Jim Nealey (storyboard artist); Tiffany Zappulla (set decorator) | Netflix |
| 2015 (20th) | Better Call Saul | "Five-O", "RICO", "Marco" | Tony Fanning (production designer), Paula Dal Santo (art director), Gregory G. Sandoval (assistant art director), Taura C.C. Rivera (set designer), Alan Chao (graphic designer), Libbe Green (set decorator) | AMC |
| 2015 (20th) | Empire | "Pilot" | Steve Saklad (production designer), Chris Cleek (art director), Joseph H. Bryant (set designer), David Soukup (graphic designer), Harry N. Haase (scenic artist), Joanna Iwanicka (set designer), Caroline Perzan (set decorator) | Fox |
| 2015 (20th) | Homeland | "The Tradition of Hospitality", "All About Allison", "The Litvinov Ruse" | John D. Kretschmer (production designer); Stephen Bream, Thomas Göldner (art directors); Thorsten Klein, Iris Paschedag, Esther Schreiner, Stefan Speth (set designers); René Jaschke; Peter Laubsch (draughtsman); Edgar Konkoll, Robert Krüger (scenic artists); Francis Kiko Soeder (concept artist); Yesim Zolan (set decorator) | Showtime |
| 2015 (20th) | True Detective | "The Western Book of the Dead", "Night Finds You", "Omega Station" | Alex DiGerlando (production designer); Richard Bloom, Maya Shimoguchi (art directors); Callie Andreadis, Gustaf Aspegren (assistant art directors); Nancy Deren, Joseph Feld, Rich Romig (set designers); Dianne Chadwick (graphic designer); Paul Stanwyck (scenic artist); Karen O'Hara (set decorator) | HBO |
2016 (21st)
| 2016 (21st) | Mr. Robot | "eps2.0_unm4sk-pt1.tc", "eps2.4_m4ster-s1ave.aes", "eps2.9_pyth0n-pt1.p7z" | Anastasia White (production designer); Miguel López-Castillo (art director); Jeannette Kim (assistant art director); Adam Brustein, Eric Bryant (graphic designers); Nick Dyball, Catherine Greene, Renee Kildow, Nicholas Meloro, David Reavis, Daniel Rosenfeld, Francesco Sciarrone, William Thompson (scenic artists); Alyssa Winter, Kate Yatsko (set decorators) | USA |
| 2016 (21st) | Better Call Saul | "Inflatable", "Fifi", "Klick" | Tony Fanning (production designer), Paula Dal Santo (art director), Gregory G. Sandoval (assistant art director), Taura C.C. Rivera (set designer), Alan Chao (graphic designer), Elaine O'Donnell (set decorator) | AMC |
| 2016 (21st) | Bloodline | "Part 16", "Part 21" | Tim Galvin (production designer), Scott G. Anderson (art director), Caleb Mikler (assistant art director), William A. Cimino (set decorator) | Netflix |
| 2016 (21st) | House of Cards | "Chapter 41", "Chapter 47", "Chapter 48" | Steve Arnold (production designer); Halina Gebarowicz (art director); Elizabeth Flaherty (assistant art director); Kate Dougherty, Darrell L. Wight (set designers); Eleni Diamantopoulos (graphic designer); Francesca Gerlach (scenic artist); Jim Nealey (storyboard artist); Tiffany Zappulla (set decorator) | Netflix |
| 2016 (21st) | Preacher | "See", "South Will Rise Again", "Finish the Song" | Dave Blass (production designer); Kirsten Oglesby, Mark Zuelzke (art directors); Derek Jensen, Gregory G. Sandoval (assistant art directors), Taura C.C. Rivera (set designer); Brandon Arrington, Tyler Standen (graphic designers); Amy Lynn Umezu (storyboard artist); Edward McLoughlin (set decorator) | AMC |
2017 (22nd)
| 2017 (22nd) | The Handmaid's Tale | "Offred", "Birth Day", "Nolite Te Bastardes Carborundorum" | Julie Berghoff (production designer); Nicolas Lepage, Evan Webber (art directors); Henry Fong (illustrator); Sean Scoffield (graphic designer); Theresa Shain (graphic artist); Christina Kuhnigk (set decorator) | Hulu |
| 2017 (22nd) | American Gods | "The Bone Orchard", "The Secret of Spoons", "Head Full of Snow" | Patti Podesta (production designer); Rory Cheyne (art director); Jon Hunter, Aaron Morrison (assistant art directors); William Koon, Sean McLoughlin, Gord Peterson, Mike Stanek (set designers); Dan Caplan, Greg Chown (storyboard artists); Jaro Dick (set decorator) | Starz |
| 2017 (22nd) | The Handmaid's Tale | "The Bridge" | Andrew M. Stearn (production designer), Evan Webber (art director), J. Ryan Halpenny (set designer), Sean Scoffield (graphic designer), Mauro Iacobelli (scenic artist), Christina Kuhnigk (set decorator) | Hulu |
| 2017 (22nd) | Mr. Robot | "eps3.0_power-saver-mode.h", "eps3.1_undo.gz", "eps3.2_legacy.so" | Anastasia White (production designer); Michael Ahern (art director); Jeannette Kim (set designer); Adam Brustein, Eric Bryant, Avery Sorrels (graphic designers); Peter Hackman (scenic artists); Kara Zeigon (set decorators) | USA |
| 2017 (22nd) | Twin Peaks | "Part 1", "Part 8", "Part 15" | Ruth De Jong (production designer); Cara Brower (art director); Nancy Deren, Scott Herbertson, Barbara Mesney (set designers); Jason Perrine, Karen Teneyck (graphic designers); Florencia Martin (set decorator) | Showtime |
2018 (23rd)
| 2018 (23rd) | The Handmaid's Tale | "June", "Unwomen" | Mark White, Elisabeth Williams (production designers); Martha Sparrow (art director); Caroline Gee, Rob Hepburn (set decorators) | Hulu |
| 2018 (23rd) | Better Call Saul | "Piñata", "Coushatta" | Judy Rhee (production designer); Paula Dal Santo (art director); Jessie Haddad (assistant art director); Alan Chao, Jimmy Hendrix (graphic artists); Ashley Michelle Marsh, Wilhelm Pfau (set decorators) | AMC |
| 2018 (23rd) | Castle Rock | "The Box" | Steve Arnold (production designer); Oana Bogdan Miller (supervising art director); Stefan Gesek (art director); Lindsay Coda, Ryan Grossheim (assistant art directors); Cosmas A. Demetriou, Ahna Packard, Marco Rubeo, Patrick Scalise (digital set designers); Hugo Santiago (set designer); Eleni Diamantopoulos (graphic designer); Jennifer Engel (set decorator) | Hulu |
| 2018 (23rd) | House of Cards | "Chapter 72" | Julie Walker (production designer), Mark Robert Taylor (art director), Elizabeth Flaherty (assistant art director), Jason Zev Cohen (graphic designer), Kenneth J. Creber (set designer), Tiffany Zappulla (set decorator) | Netflix |
| 2018 (23rd) | Ozark | "Once a Langmore...", "The Gold Coast" | Derek R. Hill (production designer); John Richardson (art director); Christopher Burkhart, Jarrette Moats (set designer); Alanna Smith (graphic designer); Danny Scott Cochran (scenic artist); Pete Johnson (model maker); Kim Leoleis (set decorator) | Netflix |
2019 (24th)
| 2019 (24th) | The Umbrella Academy | "We Only See Each Other at Weddings and Funerals" | Mark Worthington (production designer); Mark Steel (art director); Makela Barnes, Aleks Cameron, Guinevere Cheung, John Kim, Brent McGillivray, Ahn Mur, Shelby Lynn Taylor (assistant art directors); Jim Lambie (set decorator) | Netflix |
| 2019 (24th) | Big Little Lies | "What Have They Done?", "The Bad Mother", "I Want to Know" | John Paino (production designer); Austin Gorg (senior art director); Wes Hottman (assistant art director); Joanna Bush (concept illustrator); Benjamin Nowicki (graphic designer); Jason Perrine (graphic artist); Amy Wells (set decorator) | HBO |
| 2019 (24th) | The Boys | "The Female of the Species" | Dave Blass (production designer); Mark Zuelke (supervising art director); Dean O'Dell (art director); Barbara Agbaje, Adriana Bogaard, Sylvain Bombardier, Pearlamina Cheung, Henry Fong, Paul Greenberg, Dwight Hendrickson, Alex Lyons, Anna Lupi, Leks Raamat, Bartol Rendulic, Jeff Smith (assistant art directors); Joe Bower, Brandon Langford, Marty Lake, Melissa Morgan (scenic artists); Cheryl Dorsey (set decorator) | Amazon |
| 2019 (24th) | Euphoria | "The Trials and Tribulations of Trying to Pee While Depressed", "And Salt the Earth Behind You" | Kay Lee (production designer); Michael Hersey, Eric Jeon (art director); Kirby Feagan, Kit Stolen (assistant art directors); Lia Burton, Keen Kopper (set designers); Michelle Peters (graphic designer); Alison Korth, Adam Willis (set decorators) | HBO |
| 2019 (24th) | The Handmaid's Tale | "Mayday" | Elisabeth Williams (production designer); Martha Sparrow (art director); Julia Callon, Jessica Terry (assistant art directors); Maryann Adas, Dan Norton (set designers); Melissa Cormier, Sean Schoffield, Theresa Shain (graphic designers); Robert Polko (assistant graphic designer); Rob Hepburn (set decorator) | Hulu |

=== 2020s ===
| Year | Program | Episode(s) | Nominees | Network |
|---|---|---|---|---|
2020 (25th)
| 2020 (25th) | Ozark | "Wartime" | David Bomba (production designer); Sean Ryan Jennings, Hugo Santiago (art directors); Maggie Ditre (set designer); Alanna Young (graphic designer); Kim Leoleis (set decorator) | Netflix |
| 2020 (25th) | The Flight Attendant | "After Dark" | Sara K. White (production designer); Christine Foley (art director); Katie Citti, Abby J. Smith, Josh Smith (assistant art directors); Max Bode (graphic designers); Ambika Subramaniam (assistant graphic designer); David Swayze (concept illustrator); Jessica Petruccelli (set decorator) | HBO Max |
| 2020 (25th) | Killing Eve | "Are You From Pinner?" | Laurence Dorman (production designer), Beckie Harvey (supervising art director), Simon Marsay (art director), Sophia Stapleton (standby art director), Peter Nation-Grainger (assistant art director), Rachel Garlick (storyboard artist), Arthur Williams (graphic designer), Anna Southall (assistant graphic designer), Casey Williams (set decorator) | BBC America |
| 2020 (25th) | The Twilight Zone | "Among the Untrodden" | Michael Wylie (production designer); Marshall McMahen (art director); Tara Arnett, Andrew Budyk, Elizabeth Thompson (set designers); Laurent Ben-Mimoun (illustrator); Chris Buffet, Chad Kerychuk, Geoffrey Mandel, Chris Buffet (graphic artists); Íde Foyle (set decorator) | CBS All Access |
| 2020 (25th) | Utopia | "Just a Fanboy" | Steve Arnold (production designer); Oana Miller (supervising art director); Ryan Grossheim (art director); Jessie Haddad (assistant art director); Lindsay Coda, Andrew Layton, Sharon Samuels (set designers); Katalin Bujnova (illustrator); David Soukup (graphic designer); Tiffany Zappulla (set decorator) | Amazon |
2021 (26th)
| 2021 (26th) | Squid Game | "Gganbu" | Chae Kyoung-sun (production designer); Gim En-jee (art director); Jeon Hee-kyung, Jeong Hoo-min, Kim Hee-ju, Park Jeong-hyeon, Woo Woll-sook (assistant art directors); Hong Min-ji, Lee Moon-gyo (set designers); Kim Tteut-mo-a (senior draughtsman); Kim Hyeon-mi, Lee Gi-young (junior draughtsmen); An Ji-hye (concept artist); Kim Jeong-gon (set decorator) | Netflix |
| 2021 (26th) | The Handmaid's Tale | "Chicago" | Elisabeth Williams (production designer); Martha Sparrow (supervising art director); Adriana Bogaard, Larry Spittle (art directors); Rob Hepburn (set decorator) | Hulu |
| 2021 (26th) | The Morning Show | "My Least Favorite Year," "It's Like the Flu," "A Private Person" | Nelson Coates (production designer); Oana Bogdan Miller (supervising art director); Maren Lee Brown, Albert AJ Cisneros (art directors); Elizabeth Newton (assistant art director); Pam Klamer, Tom Wagman, Jim Wallis (set designers); Dylan Chapman (graphic designer); Simon Jones, T.J. Searl (graphic artists); Shauna Aronson, Nya Patrinos (set decorators) | Apple TV+ |
| 2021 (26th) | Succession | "The Disruption," "Too Much Birthday" | Stephen Carter (production designer); Marci Mudd, David Stein (art directors); Yu-Ting Lin (assistant art director); Katya Austin (graphic designer); Chris Kay (scenic artist); Katrina Whalen (visual consultant); George DeTitta Jr. (set decorator) | HBO |
| 2021 (26th) | Yellowstone | "No Kindness for the Coward" | Cary White (production designer), Yvonne Boudreaux (supervising art director), Lisa Ward (art director), Jim Hewitt (set designer), Joel Waldrep (graphic designer), Carla Curry (set decorator) | Paramount Network |
| 2022 (27th) | Better Call Saul | "Wine and Roses"; "Nippy" | Denise Pizzini (production designer), Dins Danielsen (supervising art director), Ian Scroggins (art director), Ashely Michelle Marsh (set decorator), Siobhan Roome (assistant art director), Joanna Maes-Corlew (graphic designer), Brian Buckley, Amanda Robinson (set designers) | AMC |
| 2022 (27th) | Euphoria | "You Who Cannot See, Think of Those Who Can"; "The Theater and Its Double"; "All My Life, My Heart Has Yearned for a Thing I Cannot Name" | Jason Baldwin Stewart (production designer), Nick Ralbovsky (supervising art director), Alyssa Hill, Nealy Orillion (art directors), Julia Altschul Howard, Sofía Midón (set decorators), Marcie Maute, Steven Hudosh (assistant art directors), Michelle Peters (graphic designer), Eugene Adamov, Lauren Polizzi (set designers) | HBO |
| 2022 (27th) | The White Lotus | "Ciao" | Cristina Onori (production designer), Gianpaolo Rinino (supervising art director), Silvia Colafranceschi (art director), Letizia Santucci (set decorator), Ilaria Dotti (assistant graphic designer), Vieri Cecconi, Federica Salatino (draughtsmen), Marco De Matteo (graphic artist) | HBO |
| 2022 (27th) | Ozark | "The Beginning of the End"; "Let the Great World Spin"; "City on the Make" | David Bomba (production designer), Sean Ryan Jennings, Wylie Griffin (art directors), Kim Leoleis (set decorator), Alanna Young (graphic designer), Pam Foco (set designer) | Netflix |
| 2022 (27th) | Severance | "Good News About Hell" | Jeremy Hindle (production designer), Nick Francone, Chris Shriver (supervising art directors), Angelica Borrero-Fortier, Katya Blumenberg (art director), Andrew Baseman (set decorator), Hinju Kim, Jeanette Kim, Benjamin K. Cox, Shoko Kambara, Stephen Davan (assistant art directors), Tansy Michaud (graphic designer), (set designer), Fredrik Buch, Eric Feldberg, Hugh Sicotte, David Swaze, Jamie Rama (concept artists) | Apple TV+ |
| 2023 (28th) | Fargo | "Trials and Tribulations" | Cathy Cowan (Supervising Art Director), Nathan Blackie (Art Director), Joel Tobman (Art Director), Jerod Fahlman (Assistant Art Director), Amanda Nicholson (Assistant Art Director), Daniel Nguyen (Assistant Art Director), Zachary Dearborn (Set Designer), Nigel Cutting (Set Designer), Pouya Moayedi (Concept Artist), Emily Horne (Graphic Designer), Melissa Neumiller (Graphic Designer), Spencer Smith (Graphic Designer), Amber Humphries (Set Decorator) | FX |
| 2023 (28th) | Succession | "America Decides" | Molly Mikula (Art Director), Ryan Howell (Assistant Art Director), George De Titta Jr (Set Decorator), Dustin Neiderman (Graphic Designer), Elsa GibsonBraden (Assistant Art Director) | HBO |
| 2023 (28th) | Yellowjackets | "Digestif" | Mark Stope (Supervising Art Director), Pedro Romero (Art Director), Mark Lane (Set Decorator), Glen Schroeder (Illustrator), Kirsty Graham (Assistant Art Director), Ian Greenwell (Set Designer), David Orr (Set Designer), Sheila Turner (Graphic Designer) | Showtime |
| 2023 (28th) | Poker Face | "Escape from Shit Mountain" | Martha Sparrow (Supervising Art Director), Miles Michael (Art Director), John Pollard (Set Designer), Chris Rhoton (Set Designer), Antje Ellermann (Set Designer), Alistair Milne (Illustrator), Derrick Kardos (Graphic Designer), Jaime Gross (Graphic Artist), Lizzie Eggert-Atzberger (Set Decorator), Andrew Boyce (Concept Artist), Shane Cinal (Set Designer), Kerri Mahoney (Graphic Artist) | Peacock |
| 2023 (28th) | The Morning Show | “The Kármán Line”, “Ghost in the Machine,” “Love Island” | Thomas Wilkins (Supervising Art Director), Lauree Martell (Set Decorator), Elizabeth Newton (Art Director), Clarence Major (Art Director), Michael Allen Glover (Art Director), Angelica Borrero-Fortier (Art Director), Andrew Baseman (Set Decorator), David Peters (Assistant Art Director), Jim Wallis (Set Designer), Pamela Klamer (Set Designer), Emma Sparer (Set Designer), Linwood Trey Wright (Set Designer), Andrew Kim (Concept Illustrator), T.J. Searl (Graphic Artist), Marissa Zajack (Graphic Artist), Christina Myal (Graphic Artist) | Apple TV |

== Programs with multiple awards ==
4 awards

- Mad Men (AMC)

2 awards

- Game of Thrones (HBO)
- The Handmaid's Tale (Hulu)*
- The X-Files (Fox)

== Programs with multiple nominations ==
5 nominations

- The Handmaid's Tale (Hulu)*
- Mad Men (AMC)

4 nominations

- 24 (Fox)
- Alias (ABC)
- House of Cards (Netflix)*
- Star Trek: Voyager (UPN)
- Ugly Betty (ABC)

3 nominations

- Better Call Saul (AMC)*
- Boardwalk Empire (HBO)
- Game of Thrones (HBO)
- Glee (Fox)
- Homeland (Showtime)*
- Lost (ABC)
- Pushing Daisies (ABC)
- True Blood (HBO)
- The X-Files (Fox)

2 nominations

- Deadwood (HBO)
- Desperate Housewives (ABC)
- Downton Abbey (PBS)
- Frasier (NBC)
- Heroes (NBC)
- Las Vegas (NBC)
- Mr. Robot (USA)*
- The Newsroom (HBO)*
- Ozark (Netflix)
- True Detective (HBO)*
- The Tudors (Showtime)
- The West Wing (NBC)
- The Morning Show (Apple TV)
