= Art Directors Guild Award for Excellence in Production Design for a Period Film =

Annual US film award

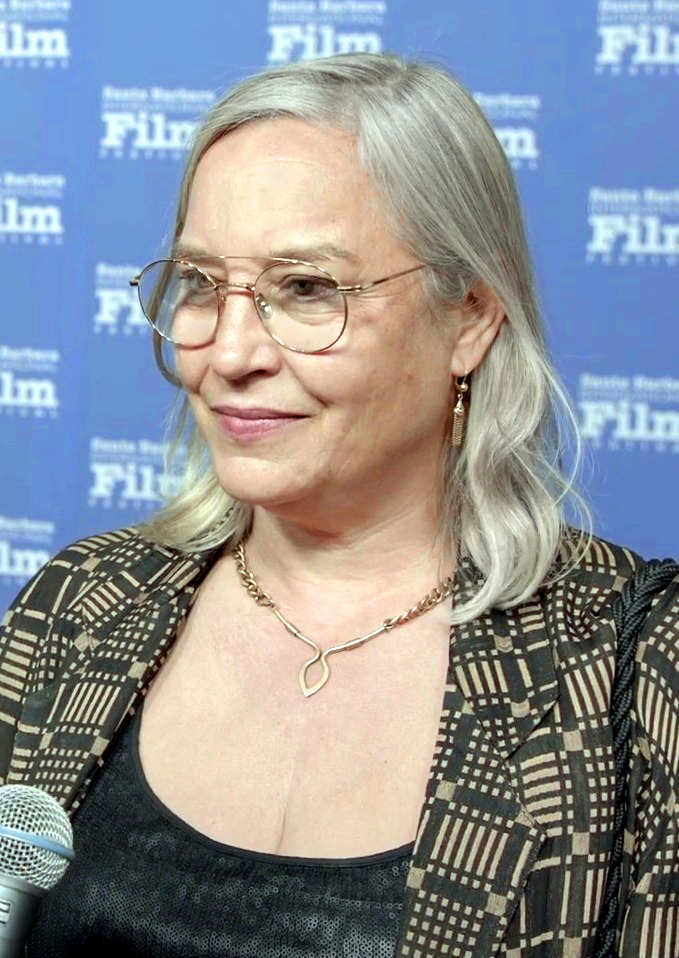
- 2025 Recipient: Tamara Deverell
- Country: United States
- Presented by: Art Directors Guild
- First award: 2006
- Currently held by: Tamara Deverell for Frankenstein (2025)
- Website: adg.org/awards/

The Art Directors Guild Award for Excellence in Production Design for a Period Film is an annual award given by the Art Directors Guild.

The award was previously combined with Excellence in Production Design for a Fantasy Film from 2000 to 2005, before being spun out into its own category in 2006.

== Winners and nominees ==
| Year | Film | Production Designer(s) |
|---|---|---|
| 2006 | Curse of the Golden Flower | Tingxiao Huo |
| 2006 | Dreamgirls | John Myhre |
| 2006 | Flags of Our Fathers | Henry Bumstead |
| 2006 | The Good Shepherd | Jeannine Oppewall |
| 2006 | The Prestige | Nathan Crowley |
| 2007 | There Will Be Blood | Jack Fisk |
| 2007 | American Gangster | Arthur Max |
| 2007 | Atonement | Sarah Greenwood |
| 2007 | Elizabeth: The Golden Age | Guy Hendrix Dyas |
| 2007 | Sweeney Todd: The Demon Barber of Fleet Street | Dante Ferretti |
| 2008 | The Curious Case of Benjamin Button | Donald Graham Burt |
| 2008 | Changeling | James J. Murakami |
| 2008 | Doubt | David Gropman |
| 2008 | Frost/Nixon | Michael Corenblith |
| 2008 | Milk | Bill Groom |
| 2009 | Sherlock Holmes | Sarah Greenwood |
| 2009 | Inglourious Basterds | David Wasco |
| 2009 | Julie & Julia | Mark Ricker |
| 2009 | Public Enemies | Nathan Crowley |
| 2009 | A Serious Man | Jess Gonchor |

=== 2010s ===
| Year | Film | Production Designer(s) |
|---|---|---|
| 2010 | The King's Speech | Eve Stewart |
| 2010 | Get Low | Geoffrey Kirkland |
| 2010 | Robin Hood | Arthur Max |
| 2010 | Shutter Island | Dante Ferretti |
| 2010 | True Grit | Jess Gonchor |
| 2011 | Hugo | Dante Ferretti |
| 2011 | Anonymous | Sebastian Krawinkel |
| 2011 | The Artist | Laurence Bennett |
| 2011 | The Help | Mark Ricker |
| 2011 | Tinker Tailor Soldier Spy | Maria Djurkovic |
| 2012 | Anna Karenina | Sarah Greenwood |
| 2012 | Argo | Peter Borck |
| 2012 | Django Unchained | David F. Klassen |
| 2012 | Les Misérables | Eve Stewart |
| 2012 | Lincoln | Rick Carter |
| 2013 | The Great Gatsby | Catherine Martin |
| 2013 | 12 Years a Slave | Adam Stockhausen |
| 2013 | American Hustle | Judy Becker |
| 2013 | Inside Llewyn Davis | Jess Gonchor |
| 2013 | Saving Mr. Banks | Michael Corenblith |
| 2014 | The Grand Budapest Hotel | Adam Stockhausen |
| 2014 | Inherent Vice | David Crank |
| 2014 | The Imitation Game | Maria Djurkovic |
| 2014 | The Theory of Everything | John Paul Kelly |
| 2014 | Unbroken | Jon Hutman |
| 2015 | The Revenant | Jack Fisk |
| 2015 | Bridge of Spies | Adam Stockhausen |
| 2015 | Crimson Peak | Thomas E. Sanders |
| 2015 | The Danish Girl | Eve Stewart |
| 2015 | Trumbo | Mark Ricker |
| 2016 | Hidden Figures | Wynn Thomas |
| 2016 | Café Society | Santo Loquasto |
| 2016 | Fences | David Gropman |
| 2016 | Hacksaw Ridge | Barry Robison |
| 2016 | Hail, Caesar! | Jess Gonchor |
| 2016 | Jackie | Jean Rabasse |
| 2017 | The Shape of Water | Paul Denham Austerberry |
| 2017 | Darkest Hour | Sarah Greenwood |
| 2017 | Dunkirk | Nathan Crowley |
| 2017 | Murder on the Orient Express | Jim Clay |
| 2017 | The Post | Rick Carter |
| 2018 | The Favourite | Fiona Crombie |
| 2018 | The Ballad of Buster Scruggs | Jess Gonchor |
| 2018 | Bohemian Rhapsody | Aaron Haye |
| 2018 | First Man | Nathan Crowley |
| 2018 | Roma | Eugenio Caballero |
| 2019 | Once Upon a Time in Hollywood | Barbara Ling |
| 2019 | 1917 | Dennis Gassner |
| 2019 | Ford v Ferrari | François Audouy |
| 2019 | The Irishman | Bob Shaw |
| 2019 | Jojo Rabbit | Ra Vincent |
| 2019 | Joker | Mark Friedberg |

=== 2020s ===
| Year | Film | Production Designer(s) |
|---|---|---|
| 2020 | Mank | Donald Graham Burt |
| 2020 | Ma Rainey's Black Bottom | Mark Ricker |
| 2020 | Mulan | Grant Major |
| 2020 | News of the World | David Crank |
| 2020 | The Trial of the Chicago 7 | Shane Valentino |
| 2021 | Nightmare Alley | Tamara Deverell |
| 2021 | The French Dispatch | Adam Stockhausen |
| 2021 | Licorice Pizza | Florencia Martin |
| 2021 | The Tragedy of Macbeth | Stefan Dechant |
| 2021 | West Side Story | Adam Stockhausen |
| 2022 | Babylon | Florencia Martin |
| 2022 | All Quiet on the Western Front | Christian M. Goldbeck |
| 2022 | Elvis | Catherine Martin and Karen Murphy |
| 2022 | The Fabelmans | Rick Carter |
| 2022 | White Noise | Jess Gonchor |
| 2023 | Oppenheimer | Ruth De Jong |
| 2023 | Asteroid City | Adam Stockhausen |
| 2023 | Killers of the Flower Moon | Jack Fisk |
| 2023 | Maestro | Kevin Thompson |
| 2023 | Napoleon | Arthur Max |
| 2024 | Nosferatu | Craig Lathrop |
| 2024 | A Complete Unknown | François Audouy |
| 2024 | The Brutalist | Judy Becker |
| 2024 | Gladiator II | Arthur Max |
| 2024 | Saturday Night | Jess Gonchor |
| 2025 (30th) | Frankenstein | Tamara Deverell |
| 2025 (30th) | Hamnet | Fiona Crombie |
| 2025 (30th) | Marty Supreme | Jack Fisk |
| 2025 (30th) | The Phoenician Scheme | Adam Stockhausen |
| 2025 (30th) | Sinners | Hannah Beachler |
