= Art Directors Guild Awards 2024 =

2024 awards for production designers

29th Art Directors Guild Awards
- Date: February 15, 2025

The 29th Art Directors Guild Excellence in Production Design Awards, honoring the best production designers in film, television and media of 2024, took place on February 15, 2025, at the InterContinental in Los Angeles, California. The nominations were announced on January 9, 2025. American actress and comedian Rachael Harris served as host for the ceremony.

American filmmaker Jason Reitman received the Cinematic Imagery Award, while German architect and production designer Carl Jules Weyl was inducted into the ADG Hall of Fame, posthumously.

== Winners and nominees ==
=== Film ===
Excellence in Production Design for a Contemporary Film	Excellence in Production Design for a Period Film
Conclave – Suzie Davies; Civil War – Caty Maxey; Emilia Pérez – Emmanuelle Duplay; The Substance – Stanislas Reydellet; Twisters – Patrick M. Sullivan	Nosferatu – Craig Lathrop; The Brutalist – Judy Becker; A Complete Unknown – François Audouy; Gladiator II – Arthur Max; Saturday Night – Jess Gonchor
Excellence in Production Design for a Fantasy Film	Excellence in Production Design for an Animated Film
Wicked – Nathan Crowley; Alien: Romulus – Naaman Marshall; Beetlejuice Beetlejuice – Mark Scruton; Dune: Part Two – Patrice Vermette; Furiosa: A Mad Max Saga – Colin Gibson	The Wild Robot – Raymond Zibach; Flow – Gints Zilbalodis; Inside Out 2 – Jason Deamer; Moana 2 – Ian Gooding; Wallace & Gromit: Vengeance Most Fowl – Matt Perry

=== Television ===
Excellence in Production Design for a One-Hour Contemporary Single-Camera Series	Excellence in Production Design for a One-Hour Period Single-Camera Series
Squid Game: "Six Legs", "O X" – Chae Kyoung-sun (Netflix); The Gentlemen: "Tackle Tommy Woo Woo" – Martyn John (Netflix); Mr. & Mrs. Smith: "A Breakup" – Gerald Sullivan (Prime Video); Slow Horses: "Returns" – Choi Ho Man (Apple TV+); Yellowstone: "Desire is All You Need", "Three Fifty-Three", "Give the World Away" – Yvonne Boudreaux (Paramount Network)	Shōgun: "Anjin" – Helen Jarvis (FX); Bridgerton: "Old Friends", "Romancing Mister Bridgerton", "Into the Light" – Alison Gartshore (Netflix); One Hundred Years of Solitude: "Remedios Moscote" – Bárbara Enriquez, Eugenio Caballero (Netflix); Pachinko: "Chapter 13" – Ruth Ammon (Netflix); Palm Royale: "Maxine's Like a Dellacorte" – Jon Carlos (Apple TV+)
Excellence in Production Design for a One-Hour Fantasy Single-Camera Series	Excellence in Production Design for a Half Hour Single-Camera Television Series
Fallout: "The End" – Howard Cummings (Prime Video); Dune: Prophecy: "The Hidden Hand" – Tom Meyer (HBO); House of the Dragon: "Smallfolk" – Jim Clay (HBO); The Lord of the Rings: The Rings of Power: "Shadow and Flame" – Kristian Milsted (Prime Video); Silo: "Solo", "Harmonium" – Nicole Northridge (Apple TV+)	What We Do in the Shadows: "Headhunting" – Shayne Fox (FX); Emily in Paris: "The Grey Area", "All Roads Lead to Rome" – Anne Seibel (Netflix); Hacks: "Just For Laughs", "Better Late" – Daniel Novotny (Max); Only Murders in the Building: "Gates of Heaven", "Valley of the Dolls" – Patrick Howe (Hulu); Shrinking: "Jimmying", "I Love Pain", "Psychological Something-ism" – Cabot McMullen (Apple TV+)
Excellence in Production Design for a Multi-Camera Series	Excellence in Production Design for a Limited Series
Frasier: "All About Eve" – Glenda Rovello (Paramount+); Bunk'd: "Busk A Move", "Cold Feet, Hot Brobblers" – Kelly Hogan (Disney Channel); Poppa's House: "Family Photo", "Wig" – Aiyana Trotter (CBS); That '90s Show: "I Can See Clearly Now", "Just a Friend", "Something to Talk About" – Greg Grande (Netflix); Wizards Beyond Waverly Place: "Saved by the Spell", "Something Wizard this Way Comes" – Kelly Hogan (Disney Channel)	The Penguin – Kalina Ivanov (HBO); Agatha All Along – John Collins (Disney+); Feud: Capote vs. The Swans – Mark Ricker (FX); Ripley – David Gropman (Netflix); True Detective: Night Country – Daniel Taylor (HBO)
Excellence in Production Design for a Television Movie	Excellence in Production Design for a Variety Special
Unfrosted – Clayton Hartley (Netflix); Apartment 7A – Simon Bowles (Paramount+); Descendants: The Rise of Red – Mark Hofeling (Disney+); The Killer – Aline Bonetto (Peacock); Música – Patrick M. Sullivan (Prime Video)	Dick Van Dyke: 98 Years of Magic – James Yarnell, Steve Morden (CBS); 2024 MTV Video Music Awards – Matthew Steinbrenner (MTV); 75th Primetime Emmy Awards – Brian Stonestreet (Fox); 77th Annual Tony Awards – Steve Bass (CBS); This Is Me... Now: A Love Story – Richard Bridgland (Prime Video)
Excellence in Production Design for a Variety or Reality Series
Saturday Night Live: "Host: Ariana Grande, Musical Guest: Stevie Nicks" – Akira Yoshimura, Keith Ian Raywood, N. Joseph De Tullio (NBC); The Daily Show: "Jon Stewart & The News Team Live at the Chicago DNC" – Dave Edwards (Comedy Central); Hell's Kitchen: "Shucking Hell" – John Janavs (Fox); John Mulaney Presents: Everybody's in LA: "The Future of L.A." – Andrea Purcigliotti (Netflix); Rupaul's Drag Race: "RDR Live!", "Werq the World" – Gianna Costa, Jen Chu (MTV)

=== Short Form ===
Excellence in Production Design for a Commercial	Excellence in Production Design for a Music Video or Webseries
Apple Pay: "Plates" – François Audouy; Bvlgari: "Eternally Reborn" – Freyja Bardell; Dr Pepper: "Into the Great Unknown" – Mark Snelgrove; Gucci Flora: "Gorgeous Orchid" – Jordan Ferrer; NBA Finals: "The Toast" – Dylan Kahn	"Not Like Us" – Freyja Bardell (performed by Kendrick Lamar); "Fortnight" – Ethan Tobman (performed by Taylor Swift and Post Malone); "Guess" – Hugh Charles Zeigler (performed by Charli XCX and Billie Eilish); "Houdini" – Brandon Mendez (performed by Eminem); "Taste" – Grant Armstrong (performed by Sabrina Carpenter)

=== Cinematic Imagery Award ===
- Jason Reitman

=== Hall of Fame ===
- Carl Jules Weyl (posthumous)

=== Lifetime Achievement Award ===
- Lisa Frazza
- Barbara Mesney
- Dan Sweetman
- J. Dennis Washington
