= Art Directors Guild Awards 2008 =

Annual US film and television awards

13th Art Directors Guild Awards
- Date: February 14, 2009

The 13th Art Directors Guild Awards, which were given on February 14, 2009, honored the best production designers of films and televisions in 2008.

== Winners and Nominees ==
=== Film ===
Contemporary Film:

- Mark Digby – Slumdog Millionaire
  - Jess Gonchor – Burn After Reading
  - James J. Murakami – Gran Torino
  - Dennis Gassner – Quantum of Solace
  - Timothy Grimes – The Wrestler

Fantasy Film:

- Nathan Crowley – The Dark Knight
  - Guy Hendrix Dyas – Indiana Jones and the Kingdom of the Crystal Skull
  - J. Michael Riva – Iron Man
  - James D. Bissell – The Spiderwick Chronicles
  - Ralph Eggleston – WALL-E

Period Film:

- Donald Graham Burt – The Curious Case of Benjamin Button
  - James J. Murakami – Changeling
  - David Gropman – Doubt
  - Michael Corenblith – Frost/Nixon
  - Bill Groom – Milk

=== Television ===
Episode of One Hour Single-Camera Series:

- Dan Bishop – Mad Men for "The Jet Set"
  - Michael Wylie – Pushing Daisies for "Bzzzzzzzzz!"
  - Suzuki Ingerslev – True Blood for "Burning House of Love"
  - Tom Conroy – The Tudors for "Episode 210"
  - Mark Worthington – Ugly Betty for "When Betty Met Yeti"

Miniseries or Television Film:

- Gemma Jackson – John Adams
  - Jerry Wanek – The Andromeda Strain
  - Robb Wilson King – The Librarian: Curse of the Judas Chalice
  - Yuda Acco – Lone Rider
  - Patti Podesta – Recount
