= Art Directors Guild Awards 2025 =

2025 awards for production designers

- Date: February 28, 2026
- Location: InterContinental, Los Angeles, California
- Presented by: Art Directors Guild
- Most wins: Florencia Martin (2)
- Most nominations: Florencia Martin (4)
- Website: adg.org/awards/

The 30th Art Directors Guild Excellence in Production Design Awards, honoring the best production designers in film, television and media of 2025, was held on February 28, 2026, at the InterContinental in Los Angeles, California.

The nominations were announced on January 7, 2026. American production designer Florencia Martin received four nominations for her work in films, commercials and music videos, winning two for One Battle After Another and the Prada commercial "Galleria Bag". Australian production designer Fiona Crombie and multi-camera comedy series Mid-Century Modern also received multiple nominations with two each.

The guild presented Lifetime Achievement Awards to four individuals for their exceptional contributions: production designer and director Bo Welch; set designer and art director Jann Engel; illustrator, storyboard artist and production designer Tom Southwell; and scenic artist Stephen McNally.

== Winners and nominees ==
=== Film ===
Excellence in Production Design for a Contemporary Film	Excellence in Production Design for a Period Film
One Battle After Another – Florencia Martin; Bugonia – James Price; F1 – Ben Munro and Mark Tildesley; Mission: Impossible – The Final Reckoning – Gary Freeman; Wake Up Dead Man: A Knives Out Mystery – Rick Heinrichs	Frankenstein – Tamara Deverell; Hamnet – Fiona Crombie; Marty Supreme – Jack Fisk; The Phoenician Scheme – Adam Stockhausen; Sinners – Hannah Beachler
Excellence in Production Design for a Fantasy Film	Excellence in Production Design for an Animated Film
The Fantastic Four: First Steps – Kasra Farahani; Avatar: Fire and Ash – Dylan Cole and Ben Procter; Mickey 17 – Fiona Crombie; Superman – Beth Mickle; Wicked: For Good – Nathan Crowley	KPop Demon Hunters – Mingjue Helen Chen and Dave Bleich; The Bad Guys 2 – Luc Desmarchelier; Elio – Harley Jessup; The SpongeBob Movie: Search for SquarePants – Sean Haworth and Pablo R. Mayer; Zootopia 2 – Cory Loftis

=== Television ===
Excellence in Production Design for a One-Hour Contemporary Single-Camera Series	Excellence in Production Design for a One-Hour Period Single-Camera Series
Severance: "Chikhai Bardo" – Jeremy Hindle (Apple TV); The Pitt: "7:00 A.M." – Nina Ruscio (HBO Max); Pluribus: "Grenade" – Denise Pizzini (Apple TV); Slow Horses: "Incommunicado"; "Tall Tales" – Choi Ho Man (Apple TV); The White Lotus: "Amor Fati" – Cristina Onori (HBO)	Palm Royale: "Maxine Drinks Martini's Now"; "Maxine Serves a Swerve" – Jon Carlos (Apple TV); The Gilded Age: "If You Want to Cook an Omelette" – Bob Shaw (HBO); House of Guinness: "Episode 1" – Richard Bullock (Netflix); It: Welcome to Derry: "The Blackspot" – Paul Austerberry (HBO); 1923: "Wrap Thee in Terror" – Cary White and Lisa Ward (Paramount+)
Excellence in Production Design for a One-Hour Fantasy Single-Camera Series	Excellence in Production Design for a Half Hour Single-Camera Television Series
Andor: "Who Are You?" – Luke Hull (Disney+); Alien: Earth: "Neverland" – Andy Nicholson (FX); The Last of Us: "Day One" – Don MacAulay (HBO); Stranger Things: "Chapter Four: Sorcerer" – Chris Trujillo (Netflix); Wednesday: "Chapter Four – If These Woes Could Talk" – Mark Scruton (Netflix)	The Studio: "The Note" – Julie Berghoff (Apple TV); The Bear: "Bears" – Merje Veski (FX); Hacks: "A Slippery Slope" – Rob Tokarz (HBO Max); Murderbot: "FreeCommerce" – Sue Chan (Apple TV); Only Murders in the Building: "The House Always..." – Patrick Howe (Hulu)
Excellence in Production Design for a Multi-Camera Series	Excellence in Production Design for a Television Movie or Limited Series
Mid-Century Modern: "Bye, George" – Glenda Rovello (Hulu); Mid-Century Modern: "Love Thy Neighbor" – Greg J. Grande (Hulu); Poppa's House: "Baby Girl"; "Magic Shine Again" – Aiyana Trotter (CBS); Vampirina: Teenage Vampire: "First Nightmare" – Maggie Ruder (Disney Channel); Wizards Beyond Waverly Place: "The Wizard at the End of the World Part II" – Kelly Hogan (Disney Channel)	Monster: The Ed Gein Story – Matthew Flood Ferguson (Netflix); Adolescence – Adam Tomlinson (Netflix); Black Mirror: "USS Callister: Into Infinity" – Miranda Jones (Netflix); Black Rabbit – Alex DiGerlando (Netflix); Death by Lightning – Gemma Jackson (Netflix)
Excellence in Production Design for a Variety or Reality Series	Excellence in Production Design for a Variety Special
Saturday Night Live: "Host: Lady Gaga" – Akira Yoshimura, Keith Ian Raywood, N. Joseph De Tullio, and Andrea Purcigliotti (NBC); Dancing with the Stars: "Wicked Night" – James Yarnell (ABC); Jimmy Kimmel Live!: "Jimmy Kimmel Live Brooklyn" – David Ellis (ABC); The Late Show with Stephen Colbert: "Kids Pitch" – Jim Fenhagen and Larry Hartman (CBS); Squid Game: The Challenge: "Catch" – Mathieu Weekes and Ben Norman (Netflix)	SNL 50: The Anniversary Special – Akira Yoshimura, Keith Ian Raywood, and N. Joseph De Tullio (NBC); Atsuko Okatsuka: Father – Gary Kordan (Hulu); Miley Cyrus: Something Beautiful – David Meyer (Disney+ / Hulu); The 78th Annual Tony Awards with Host Cynthia Erivo – Steve Bass (CBS); Wicked: One Wonderful Night – Misty Buckley (NBC)

=== Short Form ===
Excellence in Production Design for a Commercial	Excellence in Production Design for a Music Video or Webseries
Prada: "Galleria Bag" – Florencia Martin; Anderson: "Trust Your Home to Anderson" – Natalie Groce; State Farm – "Batman vs Bateman" – David Skinner; Target: "Step into the Holidays" – Nelson Coates; Xbox - ROG Xbox Ally: "Dancing in the Dark – Launch Trailer" – Florencia Martin	Apple: "Someday by Spike Jonze: AirPods 4 with Active Noise Cancelation" – Shane Valentino; Coldplay: "All My Love" – Florencia Martin; Lady Gaga: "Abracadabra" – Wesley Goodrich; Sabrina Carpenter: "Tears" – Brittany Porter; Taylor Swift: "The Fate of Ophelia" – Ethan Tobman

=== Lifetime Achievement Award ===
- Bo Welch
- Jann Engel
- Tom Southwell
- Stephen McNally
