= Art Directors Guild Awards 2013 =

Annual US film and television awards ceremony

18th Art Directors Guild Awards
- Date: February 8, 2014

The 18th Art Directors Guild Awards, which were given on February 8, 2014, honored the best production designers of 2013.

== Winners and nominees ==
=== Film ===
Period Film:

- Catherine Martin – The Great Gatsby
  - Judy Becker – American Hustle
  - Jess Gonchor – Inside Llewyn Davis
  - Michael Corenblith – Saving Mr. Banks
  - Adam Stockhausen – 12 Years a Slave

Fantasy Film:

- Andy Nicholson – Gravity
  - Philip Ivey – Elysium
  - Dan Hennah – The Hobbit: The Desolation of Smaug
  - Darren Gilford – Oblivion
  - Scott Chambliss – Star Trek Into Darkness

Contemporary Film:

- K. K. Barrett – Her
  - David Gropman – August: Osage County
  - Santo Loquasto – Blue Jasmine
  - Paul Kirby – Captain Phillips
  - Bob Shaw – The Wolf of Wall Street

=== Television ===
One-Hour Single Camera Television Series:

- Gemma Jackson – Game of Thrones (for "Valar Dohaeris")
  - Bill Groom – Boardwalk Empire (for "The Old Ship of Zion")
  - Mark Freeborn – Breaking Bad (for "Felina")
  - Donal Woods – Downton Abbey (for "Episode 7")
  - Dan Bishop – Mad Men (for "The Better Half")

Episode of a Half Hour Single-Camera Television Series:

- Jim Gloster – Veep (for "Helsinki")
  - Denise Pizzini – Arrested Development (for "The B. Team")
  - Ray Yamagata – Californication (for "The Unforgiven")
  - Richard Berg – Modern Family (for "The Wow Factor")
  - Ian Phillips – Parks and Recreation (for "London")

Multi-Camera Unscripted Series:

- Tyler Robinson – Portlandia (for "Missionaries")
  - John Shaffner – The Big Bang Theory (for "The Bakersfield Expedition")
  - Steve Olson – How I Met Your Mother (for "The Lighthouse")
  - Keith Raywood, Eugene Lee, Akira Yoshimura, and N. Joseph DeTullio – Saturday Night Live (for "Host: Justin Timberlake")
  - Anton Goss and James Pearse Connelly – The Voice (for "The Live Playoffs, Part 1")

Miniseries or Television Movie:

- Howard Cummings – Behind the Candelabra
  - Mark Worthington – American Horror Story: Coven (for "Bitchcraft")
  - Derek R. Hill – Bonnie & Clyde
  - Gregory Melton – Mob City
  - Patrizia von Brandenstein – Phil Spector
