= Art Directors Guild Awards 2012 =

Annual US film and television awards ceremony

17th Art Directors Guild Awards
- Date: February 5, 2013

The 17th Art Directors Guild Awards, which were given on February 2, 2013, honored the best production designers of 2012.

== Winners and nominees ==
=== Film ===
Period Film:

- Sarah Greenwood – Anna Karenina
  - Sharon Seymour – Argo
  - J. Michael Riva – Django Unchained
  - Eve Stewart – Les Misérables
  - Rick Carter – Lincoln

Fantasy Film:

- David Gropman – Life of Pi
  - Uli Hanisch – Cloud Atlas
  - Nathan Crowley and Kevin Kavanaugh – The Dark Knight Rises
  - Dan Hennah – The Hobbit: An Unexpected Journey
  - Arthur Max – Prometheus

Contemporary Film:

- Dennis Gassner – Skyfall
  - Alan MacDonald – The Best Exotic Marigold Hotel
  - Nelson Coates – Flight
  - Eugenio Caballero – The Impossible
  - Jeremy Hindle – Zero Dark Thirty

=== Television ===
One-Hour Fantasy Single Camera Television Series:

- Gemma Jackson – Game of Thrones (for "The Ghost of Harrenhal")
  - Bill Groom – Boardwalk Empire (for "Resolution")
  - Donal Woods – Downton Abbey (for "Christmas at Downton Abbey")
  - John D. Kretschmer – Homeland (for "The Choice")
  - Richard Hoover – The Newsroom (for "We Just Decided To")

One-Hour Contemporary Single Camera Series:

- Mark Worthington – American Horror Story: Asylum (for "I Am Anne Frank Part 2")
  - Michael Corenblith – Game Change
  - Derek R. Hill – Hatfields and McCoys (for "Night One", "Night Two", and "Night")
  - Geoffrey Kirkland – Hemingway & Gellhorn
  - Michael Wylie – Mockingbird Lane

Episode of a Half Hour Single-Camera Television Series

- Judy Becker – Girls (for "Pilot")
  - Denise Pizzini – Community (for "Pillows and Blankets")
  - Richard Berg – Modern Family (for "Misery Date")
  - Ian Phillips – Parks and Recreation (for "Soda Tax")
  - Tony Fanning – The New Normal (for "Sofa's Choice")

Episode of a Multi-Camera Variety or Unscripted Series:

- Keith Raywood, Eugene Lee, Akira Yoshimura & N. Joseph DeTullio – Saturday Night Live (for "Host: Mick Jagger")
  - Glenda Rovello – 2 Broke Girls (for "And The Silent Partner")
  - Stephan Olson – How I Met Your Mother (for "The Magician's Code, Part 1")
  - Bruce Rodgers – Democratic National Convention
  - Anton Goss and James Pearse Connelly – The Voice

Commercials & Music Videos:

- Christopher Glass – Halo 4 Commissioning (X-Box)
  - Jason Hamilton – The Return of King (Budweiser)
  - Carlos A. Menendez – Dream (Macy's)
  - Tino Schaedler – Fast Is Faster (Nike)
  - James Chinlund – Game on World (Nike+)

Awards, Music, Game Shows:

- John Myhre – 84th Annual Academy Awards
  - Bruce Rodgers – Super Bowl XLVI, Halftime Show
  - Steve Bass – The 64th Annual Primetime Emmy Awards
  - Joe Stewart – The American Music Awards, 40th Annual
  - Matthew Russell – Grammy Nomination Concert Live
