= Art Directors Guild Awards 2010 =

Annual US film and television awards ceremony

15th Art Directors Guild Awards
- Date: February 5, 2011

The 15th Art Directors Guild Awards, which were given on February 5, 2011, honored the best production designers of 2010.

== Winners and nominees ==
=== Film ===
Period Film:

- Eve Stewart – The King's Speech
  - Geoffrey Kirkland – Get Low
  - Arthur Max – Robin Hood
  - Dante Ferretti – Shutter Island
  - Jess Gonchor – True Grit

Fantasy Film:

- Guy Hendrix Dyas – Inception
  - Robert Stromberg – Alice in Wonderland
  - Barry Robison – The Chronicles of Narnia: The Voyage of the Dawn Treader
  - Stuart Craig – Harry Potter and the Deathly Hallows – Part 1
  - Darren Gilford – Tron: Legacy

Contemporary Film:

- Thérèse DePrez – Black Swan
  - Suttirat Larlarb – 127 Hours
  - Judy Becker – The Fighter
  - Donald Graham Burt – The Social Network
  - Sharon Seymour – The Town

=== Television ===
One Hour Period Single-Camera Series:

- Dan Bishop – Mad Men (for "Public Relations")
  - Carlos Barbosa – 24 (for "4:00 p.m. – 5:00 p.m.")
  - Mark Hutman – Glee (for "Britney/Brittany")
  - Suzuki Ingerslev – True Blood (for "Trouble")
  - Tom Conroy – The Tudors (for "Episode #407")

One Hour Contemporary Single-Camera Series:

- Robb Wilson King – Secrets in the Wall
  - Marcia Hinds – Revenge of the Bridesmaids

Multi-Camera Unscripted Series:

- Keith Raywood, Eugene Lee, Akira Yoshimura, and N. Joseph DeTullio – Saturday Night Live (for "Host: Betty White/Jay-Z")
  - John Shaffner and Joe Stewart – Conan (for "Episode 1.1")
  - John Janvas – Hell's Kitchen (for "810")
  - Stephan G. Olson – How I Met Your Mother (for "Natural History")
  - John Shaffner – Two and a Half Men (for "Hookers, Hookers, Hookers")

Television Movie or Limited Series:

- Richard Berg – Modern Family (for "Halloween")
  - Keith Raywood – 30 Rock (for "Live Show")
  - Derek R. Hill – Community (for "Basic Rocket Science")
  - Joseph P. Lucky – Outsourced (for "Home for the Diwalidays")
  - Cabot McMullen – United States of Tara (for "Trouble Junction")

Awards, Music, or Game Show:

- David Rockwell – 82nd Annual Academy Awards
  - Bruce Rodgers – Super Bowl XLIV
  - Florian Wieder – 2010 MTV Video Music Awards
  - Steve Bass – 62nd Primetime Emmy Awards
  - Brian Stonestreet – 67th Golden Globe Awards

Commercial, Promo, PSA, or Music Video:

- Jesse B. Benson – Dos Equis (Ice Fishing)
  - Jeffery Beecroft – Milk (The Dentist)
  - Jeremy Reed – Capital One (Rapunzel)
  - Ken Averill – Farmers Insurance (Frozen Pipes)
  - Floyd Albee – Ford Fiesta (Launch)

Special Awards:

- Hall of Fame – Alexander Golitzen
- Lifetime Achievement Award – Patricia Norris
- Outstanding Contribution to Cinematic Imagery – Syd Dutton
