= Art Directors Guild Awards 2020 =

Award for art directors in production design

25th Art Directors Guild Awards
- Date: April 10, 2021

The 25th Art Directors Guild Excellence in Production Design Awards, honoring the best production designers in film, television and media of 2020, was held on April 10, 2021, in a virtual ceremony. The nominations were announced on February 25, 2021.

== Winners and nominees ==
=== Film ===
Winners are listed first, highlighted in boldface.

Excellence in Production Design for a Contemporary Film	Excellence in Production Design for a Period Film
**Da 5 Bloods – Wynn Thomas**: I'm Thinking of Ending Things – Molly Hughes; Palm Springs – Jason Kisvarday; Promising Young Woman – Michael T. Perry; The Prom – Jamie Walker McCall	**Mank – Donald Graham Burt**: Ma Rainey's Black Bottom – Mark Ricker; Mulan – Grant Major; News of the World – David Crank; The Trial of the Chicago 7 – Shane Valentino
Excellence in Production Design for a Fantasy Film	Excellence in Production Design for an Animated Film
**Tenet – Nathan Crowley**: Birds of Prey – K. K. Barrett; Pinocchio – Dimitri Capuani; The Midnight Sky – Jim Bissell; Wonder Woman 1984 – Aline Bonetto	**Soul – Steve Pilcher**: A Shaun the Sheep Movie: Farmageddon – Matt Perry; Onward – Noah Klocek; The Croods: A New Age – Nate Wragg; Wolfwalkers – Ross Stewart, Tomm Moore, Maria Pareja

=== Television ===
Winners are listed first, highlighted in boldface.

Excellence in Production Design for a One-Hour Contemporary Single-Camera Series	Excellence in Production Design for a One-Hour Period or Fantasy Single-Camera Series
**Ozark (Episode: "Wartime") – David Bomba**: Killing Eve (Episode: "Are You from Pinner?") – Laurence Dorman; The Flight Attendant (Episode: "After Dark") – Sara K. White; The Twilight Zone (Episode: "Among the Untrodden") – Michael Wylie; Utopia (Episode: "Just a Fanboy") – Steve Arnold	**The Mandalorian (Episode: "Chapter 13: The Jedi") – Andrew L. Jones, Doug Chiang**: Lovecraft Country (Episode: "I Am") – Kalina Ivanov; Perry Mason (Episode: "Chapter Three") – John Perry Goldsmith; The Crown (Episode: "War") – Martin Childs; Westworld (Episode: "Parce Domine") – Howard Cummings
Excellence in Production Design for a Half Hour Single-Camera Television Series	Excellence in Production Design for a Multi-Camera Series
**What We Do in the Shadows (Episodes: "Resurrection", "Collaboration", "Witches") – Kate Bunch**: Dead to Me (Episodes: "You Don't Have to Go", "It Had to Be You") – L.J. Houdyshell; Emily in Paris (Episode: "Emily in Paris") – Anne Seibel; Mythic Quest: Raven's Banquet (Episode: "Pilot") – Mark Worthington; Space Force (Episode: "THE LAUNCH") – Susie Mancini	**Will & Grace (Episodes: "Accidentally on Porpoise", "We Love Lucy", "It's Time") – Glenda Rovello**: Ashley Garcia: Genius in Love (Episode: "Unintended Consequences") – Josee F. Lemonnier; Bob Hearts Abishola (Episodes: "Randy's a Wrangler", "Paris is for Lovers, Not Mothers", "Straight Outta Lagos") – John Shaffner; Family Reunion (Episodes: "Remember When Jade Was Down with the Swirl?", "Remember When Shaka Got Beat Up?") – Aiyana Trotter; The Neighborhood (Episodes: "Welcome to the New Pastor", "Welcome to the Hockey Game") – Wendell Johnson
Excellence in Production Design for a Variety, Reality or Competition Series	Excellence in Production Design for a Variety Special
**Saturday Night Live (Episodes: "Host: John Mulaney + Music: David Byrne", "Host: Adele + Music: H.E.R.", "Host: Dave Chappelle + Music: Foo Fighters") – Keith Raywood, Eugene Lee, Akira Yoshimura, N. Joseph De Tullio**: Earth to Ned (Episode: "Ned: The Musical") – Darcy Prevost; The Masked Singer (Episode: "The Season Premiere – The Masks Return") – James Connelly; The Voice (Episodes: "Live Finale Ep. 18", "The Blind Auditions, Season Premiere Ep. 1", "The Battles Premiere Ep. 6") – Zeya Maurer, James Connelly, Anton Goss; Wheel of Fortune (Episodes: "Consumer Cellular Secret Santa", "Fabulous Food") – Renee Hoss-Johnson	**Black Is King – Hannah Beachler, Carlos Laszlo, Susan Linss, Miranda Lorenz, Brandon Mendez, Rika Nakanishi, Ethan Tobman**: 2020 Democratic National Convention – Bruce Rodgers; Super Bowl LIV Halftime Show Starring Jennifer Lopez and Shakira – Bruce Rodgers; The Oscars – Jason Sherwood; Yearly Departed – Suzuki Ingerslev
Excellence in Production Design for a Television Movie or Limited Series
**The Queen's Gambit – Uli Hanisch**: Fargo – Warren Alan Young; Hollywood – Matthew Flood Ferguson; Little Fires Everywhere – Jessica Kender; The Alienist: Angel of Darkness – Ruth Ammon

=== Short Form ===
Winners are listed first, highlighted in boldface.

Excellence in Production Design for a Web Series, Music Video or Commercial

**Harry Styles: "Falling" music video – François Audouy**

- Adidas Originals: "Superstar – Change is a Team Sport" – Ruth de Jong
- Apple: "Vertical Cinema" – Shane Valentino
- Camila Cabello: "My Oh My" music video – François Audouy
- Taylor Swift: "Cardigan" music video – Ethan Tobman

=== Lifetime Achievement Award ===
- **John Eaves**
- **Patrick DeGreve**
- **Martha Johnson**
- **Stuart Wurtzel**
