= Art Directors Guild Awards 2007 =

Annual US film and television awards

12th Art Directors Guild Awards
- Date: February 16, 2008

The 12th Art Directors Guild Awards, given on February 16, 2008, honored the best art directors of 2007.

== Winners and nominees ==
=== Film ===
Contemporary Film:

- Jess Gonchor – No Country for Old Men
  - Peter Wenham – The Bourne Ultimatum
  - Michel Eric and Laurent Ott – The Diving Bell and the Butterfly (Le scaphandre et le papillon)
  - Carlos Conti – The Kite Runner
  - Kevin Thompson – Michael Clayton

Fantasy Film:

- Dennis Gassner – The Golden Compass
  - James D. Bissell – 300
  - Stuart Craig – Harry Potter and the Order of the Phoenix
  - Rick Heinrichs – Pirates of the Caribbean: At World's End
  - Harley Jessup – Ratatouille

Period Film:

- Jack Fisk – There Will Be Blood
  - Arthur Max – American Gangster
  - Sarah Greenwood – Atonement
  - Guy Hendrix Dyas – Elizabeth: The Golden Age
  - Dante Ferretti – Sweeney Todd: The Demon Barber of Fleet Street

=== Television ===
Single-Camera Series:

- Dan Bishop – Mad Men (for "Shoot")
  - Ruth Ammon – Heroes (for "Five Years Gone")
  - Zack Grobler – Lost (for "Through the Looking Glass")
  - Michael Wylie – Pushing Daisies (for "Pie Lette (Pilot)")
  - Mark Worthington – Ugly Betty (for "East Side Story")

Multi-Camera Series:

- John Sabato – Mad TV (for "Mad TV")
  - Bernard Vyzga – Back to You (for "Pilot")
  - Stephan Olson – How I Met Your Mother (for "Something Blue")
  - Bernard Vyzga – Rules of Engagement (for "Fix Ups and Downs")
  - John S. Shaffner – Two and a Half Men (for "Is There a Mrs. Waffles?")

Miniseries or Television Film:

- Tom Meyer – Pu-239
  - Marek Dobrowolski – The Company
  - Tracey Gallacher – The Starter Wife
