= Dennis Gassner =

American/Canadian production designer (born 1948)

- Born: October 22, 1948 (age 77); Vancouver, British Columbia, Canada
- Education: University of Oregon
- Occupations: Art director, production designer
- Years active: 1979–present

Dennis Gassner (born October 22, 1948) is an American-Canadian production designer. He is notable for his work on Bugsy, Big Fish, Into the Woods, and Blade Runner 2049, his collaborations with the Coen brothers and Sam Mendes, as well the James Bond films Quantum of Solace, Skyfall, and Spectre, the latter two directed by Mendes. He has been nominated seven times for the Academy Award for Best Production Design, and has won once. Gassner was nominated for the Art Directors Guild Award for Excellence in Production Design for a Contemporary Film for his work on Quantum of Solace, and won for his work on Skyfall.

Gassner attended the University of Oregon, where he played college football as a defensive end from 1967 to 1969.

== Filmography ==
Year	Title	Director
1986	The Hitcher	Robert Harmon
1986	Wisdom	Emilio Estevez
1987	In the Mood	Phil Alden Robinson
1987	Like Father Like Son	Rod Daniel
1988	Earth Girls Are Easy	Julien Temple
1989	Field of Dreams	Phil Alden Robinson
1990	Miller's Crossing	Joel Coen
1990	The Grifters	Stephen Frears
1991	Barton Fink	Joel Coen
1991	Bugsy	Barry Levinson
1992	Hero	Stephen Frears
1994	The Hudsucker Proxy	Joel Coen
1995	Waterworld	Kevin Reynolds
1998	The Truman Show	Peter Weir
2000	O Brother, Where Art Thou?	Joel Coen
2001	The Man Who Wasn' There	Joel Coen
2002	Road to Perdition	Sam Mendes
2003	Big Fish	Tim Burton
2004	The Ladykillers	Joel Coen and Ethan Coen
2005	Jarhead	Sam Mendes
2006	Ask the Dust	Robert Towne
2007	The Golden Compass	Chris Weitz
2008	Quantum of Solace	Marc Forster
2012	Skyfall	Sam Mendes
2014	Into the Woods	Rob Marshall
2015	Spectre	Sam Mendes
2017	Blade Runner 2049	Denis Villeneuve
2019	1917	Sam Mendes
2022	The Gray Man	Anthony and Joe Russo
2025	The Electric State	Anthony and Joe Russo
2026	Digger	Alejandro González Iñárritu

== Awards ==
=== Academy Awards ===
Year	Nominated work	Category	Result
1991	Barton Fink	Best Production Design	Nominated
1991	Bugsy	Best Production Design	Won
2002	Road to Perdition	Best Production Design	Nominated
2007	The Golden Compass	Best Production Design	Nominated
2014	Into the Woods	Best Production Design	Nominated
2017	Blade Runner 2049	Best Production Design	Nominated
2019	1917	Best Production Design	Nominated

=== British Academy Film Awards ===
Year	Nominated work	Category	Result
1998	The Truman Show	Best Production Design	Won
2000	O Brother, Where Art Thou?	Best Production Design	Nominated
2002	Road to Perdition	Best Production Design	Won
2003	Big Fish	Best Production Design	Nominated
2012	Skyfall	Best Production Design	Nominated
2017	Blade Runner 2049	Best Production Design	Nominated
2019	1917	Best Production Design	Won

=== Art Directors Guild ===
Year	Nominated work	Category	Result
2001	The Man Who Wasn't There	Excellence in Production Design for a Period or Fantasy Film	Nominated
2002	Road to Perdition	Excellence in Production Design for a Period or Fantasy Film	Nominated
2005	Jarhead	Excellence in Production Design for a Contemporary Film	Nominated
2007	The Golden Compass	Excellence in Production Design for a Fantasy Film	Won
2008	Quantum of Solace	Excellence in Production Design for a Contemporary Film	Nominated
2012	Skyfall	Excellence in Production Design for a Contemporary Film	Won
2014	Into the Woods	Excellence in Production Design for a Fantasy Film	Nominated
2015	Spectre	Excellence in Production Design for a Contemporary Film	Nominated
2017	Blade Runner 2049	Excellence in Production Design for a Fantasy Film	Won
2019	1917	Excellence in Production Design for a Period Film	Nominated
