= Art Directors Guild Awards 2004 =

Annual US film and television awards ceremony

9th Art Directors Guild Awards
- Date: February 12, 2005

The 9th Art Directors Guild Awards, given on 12 February 2005, honored the best art directors of 2004.

== Winners and nominees ==
=== Film ===
Contemporary Film:

- Alex McDowell – The Terminal
  - David Wasco – Collateral
  - Dan Leigh – Eternal Sunshine of the Spotless Mind
  - Mark Friedberg – The Life Aquatic
  - Henry Bumstead – Million Dollar Baby

Period or Fantasy Film:

- Rick Heinrichs – Lemony Snicket's A Series of Unfortunate Events
  - Dante Ferretti – The Aviator
  - Gemma Jackson – Finding Neverland
  - Lou Romano – The Incredibles
  - Anthony Pratt – The Phantom of the Opera
