= Art Directors Guild Awards 2009 =

Annual US film and television awards

14th Art Directors Guild Awards
- Date: February 5, 2010

The 14th Art Directors Guild Awards, which were given on February 5, 2010, honored the best production designers of 2009.

== Winners and nominees ==
=== Film ===
Period Film:

- Sarah Greenwood – Sherlock Holmes
  - David Wasco – Inglourious Basterds
  - Jess Gonchor – A Serious Man
  - Mark Ricker – Julie & Julia
  - Nathan Crowley – Public Enemies

Fantasy Film:

- Rick Carter and Robert Stromberg – Avatar
  - K. K. Barrett – Where The Wild Things Are
  - Philip Ivey – District 9
  - Scott Chambliss – Star Trek
  - Stuart Craig – Harry Potter and the Half-Blood Prince

Contemporary Film:

- Karl Juliusson – The Hurt Locker
  - Allan Cameron – Angels & Demons
  - Bill Brzeski – The Hangover
  - Namoi Shohan – The Lovely Bones
  - Steve Saklad – Up in the Air
