= Burn After Reading =

2008 film directed by Joel and Ethan Coen

- Theatrical release poster
- Directed by: Joel Coen; Ethan Coen
- Written by: Joel Coen; Ethan Coen
- Produced by: Joel Coen; Ethan Coen
- Starring: George Clooney; Frances McDormand; John Malkovich; Tilda Swinton; Richard Jenkins; Brad Pitt
- Cinematography: Emmanuel Lubezki
- Edited by: Roderick Jaynes (Note: Roderick Jaynes is the shared pseudonym used by the Coen brothers for their editing.)
- Music by: Carter Burwell
- Production companies: StudioCanal; Relativity Media; Working Title Films; Mike Zoss Productions
- Distributed by: Focus Features (International); Universal Pictures (United Kingdom, Ireland, Australia, New Zealand, Benelux and Spain); StudioCanal (France)
- Release dates: August 27, 2008 (Venice); September 12, 2008 (United States); October 17, 2008 (United Kingdom); December 10, 2008 (France)
- Running time: 96 minutes
- Countries: United States; United Kingdom; France
- Language: English
- Budget: $37 million
- Box office: $163.8 million

Burn After Reading is a 2008 black comedy espionage film written, produced, edited and directed by Joel and Ethan Coen. It follows a recently jobless CIA analyst, Osborne Cox (John Malkovich), whose misplaced memoirs are found by a pair of dimwitted gym employees (Frances McDormand and Brad Pitt). When they mistake the memoirs for classified government documents, they embark on a series of misadventures in an attempt to profit from their find. The film also stars George Clooney as a womanizing U.S. Marshal; Tilda Swinton as Katie Cox, the wife of Osborne Cox; Richard Jenkins as the gym manager; and J. K. Simmons as a CIA supervisor.

The film premiered on August 27, 2008, at the Venice Film Festival. It was released in the United States on September 12, 2008, and in the United Kingdom on October 17, 2008. It performed well at the box office, grossing over $163 million from its $37 million budget. Critical response was mostly positive, and the film received nominations at both the Golden Globes and British Academy Film Awards.

== Plot ==
Faced with a demotion due to a drinking problem, Osborne Cox angrily quits his job as a CIA analyst and decides to write a memoir. When he tells his wife Katie, she secretly files for divorce and continues an ongoing affair with Harry Pfarrer, a married U.S. Marshal with paranoid tendencies. At the instruction of her lawyer, Katie delivers a digital copy of her husband's financial records and other personal files, unwittingly including a rough draft of Osborne's memoir. The lawyer's assistant copies the files onto a CD-R, which she accidentally leaves on the floor of the locker room at Hardbodies, a local gym. The disc falls into the hands of personal trainer Chad Feldheimer and his co-worker Linda Litzke, who mistakenly believe it contains sensitive government information.

Chad and Linda devise a plan to return the disc to Osborne for a reward, as Linda is eager to raise money for her cosmetic surgeries. However, their inept efforts to blackmail Osborne only enrage him. Upon their failure to secure money from Osborne, Chad and Linda try to sell the disc to the Russian embassy, meeting with a Russian government official. Information about the meeting later makes it back to the CIA via a mole inside the Russian embassy. Osborne's increasingly erratic behavior prompts Katie to change the locks on their house and to invite Harry to move in. Meanwhile, Harry is a serial philanderer who incidentally becomes romantically involved with Linda after meeting her on a dating site.

Having falsely promised the Russians more files, Linda persuades Chad to sneak into the Cox house to steal files from Osborne's computer. Harry walks in and finds Chad hiding in a closet; startled, he reflexively shoots him in the head with his firearm. Harry searches the body for clues, but finds an empty wallet and missing suit tags, a precaution Chad took on Linda's advice. Harry surmises from his lack of identifying features that Chad is a government agent. At CIA headquarters, Osborne's former supervisor Palmer DeBakey Smith and his superior learn that information from Osborne has been given to the Russian embassy. They are perplexed because the information is of no particular importance and the perpetrators' motive is unknown. To avoid the involvement of the FBI, the superior orders that Chad's death be covered up.

Harry realizes that he is being tailed and catches and confronts the tail, who admits to being an employee of a divorce lawyer hired by his wife. Depressed, Harry meets with Linda, who is distressed over Chad's disappearance. Harry agrees to help find him, unaware that Chad is the man he killed. Linda returns to the embassy, believing the Russians have abducted Chad, but they deny this. After they inform her the contents of the CD she has given them are worthless, she convinces the manager of Hardbodies, Ted (who has unrequited feelings for Linda), to help her by sneaking into the Cox household to gather more files.

Harry and Linda meet in a park, where Linda reveals the address where Chad went before he disappeared. Harry realizes that Chad is the man he shot and flees, convinced Linda is a spy. When Osborne breaks into Katie's house with a hatchet to retrieve his personal belongings and her valuables, he finds Ted in the basement; Osborne shoots him, chases him into the street, and kills him with the hatchet.

At CIA headquarters, Smith relates the events to his superior. A surveilling CIA officer who saw Osborne's highly conspicuous attack intervened and shot him, leaving him comatose with a low chance of survival. Harry has been detained while boarding a flight to Venezuela, a country with no extradition treaty with the U.S.; the superior orders that Harry be released and allowed to continue to Venezuela, rather than deal with the consequences of bringing him into custody. Linda has been captured, but she agrees to keep quiet if they will pay for her surgeries. The superior, bewildered by the litany of events, approves the payment and closes the file.

== Cast ==
- George Clooney as Harry Pfarrer
- Frances McDormand as Linda Litzke
- Brad Pitt as Chad Feldheimer
- John Malkovich as Osborne Cox
- Tilda Swinton as Katie Cox
- Richard Jenkins as Ted
- Elizabeth Marvel as Sandy Pfarrer
- David Rasche as CIA Officer Palmer DeBakey Smith
- J. K. Simmons as CIA superior
- Olek Krupa as Krapotkin
- Jeffrey DeMunn as Cosmetic Surgeon
- Kevin Sussman as Tuchman Marsh Employee
- Dermot Mulroney as himself

== Production ==
=== Background and writing ===
Working Title Films produced the film for Focus Features, which also has worldwide distribution rights. Burn After Reading was the first Coen brothers film not to use Roger Deakins as cinematographer since Miller's Crossing. Emmanuel Lubezki, four-time Academy Award-nominated cinematographer of Sleepy Hollow and Children of Men, took over for Deakins, who had already committed to shooting Sam Mendes' Revolutionary Road. Mary Zophres served as costume designer, marking her eighth consecutive movie with the Coen brothers. Carter Burwell, a composer who worked with the Coens in 11 previous films, created the score. Early in the production, Burwell and the Coens decided that the score should be emphatically percussive to match the deluded self-importance of the characters, and they noted the all-drum score for the political thriller Seven Days in May. Joel Coen wanted the score to be "big and bombastic,... important sounding but absolutely meaningless." Burwell wrote that a percussive score would help "avoid any emotional comment" and "would lend an air of sobriety, gravity, and bombast to the general silliness". The Burn score ultimately made frequent use of Japanese Taiko drums.

Burn After Reading was the first original screenplay written by Joel and Ethan Coen since their 2001 film, The Man Who Wasn't There. Ethan Coen compared Burn After Reading to the Allen Drury political novel Advise and Consent and called it "our version of a Tony Scott/Jason Bourne kind of movie, without the explosions." Joel Coen said that they intended to create a spy film because "we hadn't done one before", but feels that the final result was more of a character-driven film than a spy story. Joel also said that Burn After Reading was not meant to be a comment or satire on Washington.

Parts of the Burn screenplay were written while the Coens were also writing their adaptation of No Country for Old Men. The Coens created characters with actors George Clooney, Brad Pitt, Frances McDormand, John Malkovich and Richard Jenkins in mind for the parts, and the script derived from the brothers' desire to include them in a "fun story." Ethan Coen said that Pitt's character was partially inspired by a botched hair-coloring job from a commercial that Pitt had made. Tilda Swinton, who was cast later than the other actors, was the only major actor whose character was not written specifically for her. The Coens struggled to develop a common filming schedule to accommodate the A-list cast.

Production Weekly, an online entertainment-industry magazine, falsely reported in October 2006 that Burn After Reading was a loose adaptation of Burn Before Reading: Presidents, CIA Directors, and Secret Intelligence, a memoir by former U.S. Director of Central Intelligence Stansfield Turner. The Coen brothers script had nothing to do with the Turner book; nevertheless, the rumor was not clarified until a Los Angeles Times article more than one year later.

=== Filming ===
Principal photography took place around Brooklyn Heights, as the Coens wanted to stay in New York City to be with their families. Other scenes were filmed in Paramus, New Jersey, Westchester County, New York, and Washington, D.C., particularly in the Georgetown neighborhood. Filming began on August 27, 2007, and was completed on October 30, 2007. John Malkovich, appearing in his first Coen brothers film, said of the shooting, "The Coens are very delightful: smart, funny, very specific about what they want but not overly controlling, as some people can be."

== Release ==
=== Festival run and press tour ===
The film opened the Venice Film Festival in August 2008.

The Coen brothers said idiocy was a major central theme of Burn After Reading; Joel said he and his brother have "a long history of writing parts for idiotic characters" and described Clooney and Pitt's characters as "dueling idiots." Burn After Reading is the third of four Coen brothers films with Clooney (O Brother, Where Art Thou?, Intolerable Cruelty and, later, Hail, Caesar!), who acknowledged that he usually plays a fool in their movies: "I've done three films with them and they call it my trilogy of idiots." Joel said after the last scene was shot, "George said: 'OK, I've played my last idiot!' So I guess he won't be working with us again."

Pitt, who plays a particularly unintelligent character, said of his role, "After reading the part, which they said was hand-written for myself, I was not sure if I should be flattered or insulted." Pitt also said when he was shown the script, he told the Coens he did not know how to play the part because the character was such an idiot: "There was a pause, and then Joel goes...'You'll be fine'."

During a fall movie preview, Entertainment Weekly wrote that Malkovich "easily racks up the most laughs" among the cast as the foul-mouthed and short-tempered ex-CIA man. The first scene Malkovich performed was a phone call in which he shouts several obscenities at Pitt and McDormand. But Malkovich could not be on the sound stage for the call because he was rehearsing a play, so he called in the lines from his apartment in Paris. Regarding the scene, Malkovich said, "It was really late at night and I was screaming at the top of my lungs. God knows what the neighbors thought." Swinton plays Malkovich's wife who engages in an affair with Clooney, although the two characters do not get along well. Clooney's and Swinton's characters also had a poor relationship in their previous film together, Michael Clayton, prompting Clooney to say to Swinton at the end of a shoot, "Well, maybe one day we'll get to make a film together when we say one nice thing to each other." Swinton said of the dynamic, "I'm very happy to shout at him on screen. It's great fun."

Swinton described Burn After Reading as "a kind of monster caper movie" and said of the characters, "All of us are monsters – like, true monsters. It's ridiculous." She also said, "I think there is something random at the heart of this one. On the one hand, it really is bleak and scary. On the other, it is really funny. ... It's the whatever-ness of it. You feel that at any minute of any day in any town, this could happen." Malkovich said of the characters, "No one in this film is very good. They're either slightly emotional or mentally defective. Quirky, self-aggrandizing, scheming." Pitt said the cast did little ad-libbing because the script was so tightly written and wove so many overlapping stories together. Veteran actor Richard Jenkins said the Coen brothers asked him if he could lose weight for his role as the gym manager, to which Jenkins jokingly replied, "I'm a 60-year-old man, not Brad Pitt. My body isn't going to change."

Joel Coen said the sex machine built by Clooney's character was inspired by a machine he once saw a key grip build, and by another machine he saw in the Museum of Sex in New York City.

=== Home media ===
Burn After Reading was released on Region 1 DVD and Blu-ray disc on December 21, 2008. The Region 2 version was released on February 9, 2009. The Blu-ray contains three bonus features, including behind-the-scenes footage and interviews with cast and crew.

== Reception ==
=== Box office ===
In its opening weekend, the film grossed $19.1 million from 2,651 theaters in the United States and Canada, ranking number one at the box office. It went on to gross $60.4 million in the United States and Canada, and $103.4 million in other territories, for a worldwide total of $163.7 million worldwide.

=== Critical response ===
On Rotten Tomatoes, the film holds an approval rating of 78% based on 248 reviews, and an average rating of 6.90/10. The website's critical consensus states, "With Burn After Reading, the Coen Brothers have crafted another clever comedy/thriller with an outlandish plot and memorable characters." Metacritic assigned the film a weighted average score of 63 out of 100 based on 37 critics, indicating "generally favorable" reviews.

The Times, which gave the film four out of five stars, compared it to the Coen films Raising Arizona and Fargo in its "savagely comic taste for creative violence and a slightly mocking eye for detail." The review said that the attention to detail was so impeccable that "the Coens can even raise a laugh with something as simple as a well-placed photograph of Vladimir Putin", and complimented Carter Burwell's musical score, which it described as "the most paranoid piece of film music since Quincy Jones's neurotic soundtrack for The Anderson Tapes."

Andrew Pulver, film reviewer for The Guardian, awarded the film four out of five stars, calling it "a tightly wound, slickly plotted spy comedy that couldn't be in bigger contrast to the Coens' last film, the bloodsoaked, brooding No Country for Old Men." Pulver said that the film "may also go down as arguably the Coens' happiest engagement with the demands of the Hollywood A-list."

The Hollywood Reporter reviewer Kirk Honeycutt complimented the actors for making fun of their screen personae, and said that the Coen brothers "... have taken some of cinema's top and most expensive actors and chucked them into Looney Tunes roles in a thriller." Honeycutt also said "it takes awhile to adjust to the rhythms and subversive humor of Burn because this is really an anti-spy thriller in which nothing is at stake, no one acts with intelligence and everything ends badly."

Todd McCarthy of Variety wrote a strongly negative review, saying that the film "tries to mate sex farce with a satire of a paranoid political thriller, with arch and ungainly results." McCarthy said the talented cast was forced to act like cartoon characters, described Carter Burwell's score as "uncustomarily overbearing" and said the dialogue is "dialed up to an almost grotesquely exaggerated extent, making for a film that feels misjudged from the opening scene and thereafter only occasionally hits the right note."

Time film critic Richard Corliss wrote that he did not understand what the Coen brothers were attempting with the film: "I have the sinking feeling I've made Burn After Reading sound funnier than it is. The movie's glacial affectlessness, its remove from all these subpar schemers, left me cold and perplexed."

David Denby of The New Yorker said that the film had several funny scenes, but that they "are stifled by a farce plot so bleak and unfunny that it freezes your responses after about forty-five minutes." Denby criticized the film's pattern of violence in which innocent people die quickly and the guilty go unpunished. "These people don't mean much to [the Coen brothers]; it's hardly a surprise that they don't mean much to us, either. ... Even black comedy requires that the filmmakers love someone, and the mock cruelties in Burn After Reading come off as a case of terminal misanthropy."

Leah Rozen of People said that the characters' "unrelenting dumbness and dim-witted behavior is at first amusing and enjoyable but eventually grows wearing." But Rozen said that the performances are a redeeming factor, especially that of Pitt, whom she described as a standout who "manages simultaneously to be delightfully broad and smartly nuanced."

Le Monde noticed the film's "particularly bitter image of the U.S. The alliance of political incompetence (the CIA), the cult of appearance (the gym club) and vulgar stupidity (everyone) is the target of a settling of scores" where the comedy "sprouts from a well of bitterness."

Almost a decade later, The New Republic senior editor Jeet Heer argued that the film was "singularly prophetic of the Trump era" anticipating "the Trump campaign's collusion with Russian operatives" and "the wider culture of deceit that made Donald Trump's rise possible. More than just a satire on espionage, the movie is scathing critique of modern America as a superficial, post-political society where cheating of all sorts comes all too easily....The most disturbing thing about Burn After Reading, though, is how it resembles every day in Trump's Washington, where the line between blundering idiocy and malevolent conspiracy is increasingly blurred."

In July 2025, it was one of the films voted for the "Readers' Choice" edition of The New York Times' list of "The 100 Best Movies of the 21st Century," finishing at number 276.

== Accolades ==
The National Board of Review named Burn After Reading in its list of the Top 10 Movies of 2008. Noel Murray of The A.V. Club named it the second-best film of 2008, Empire magazine named it the third-best film of 2008, and Owen Gleiberman of Entertainment Weekly named it the seventh-best film of 2008.

Award	Date of ceremony	Category	Recipient(s)	Result	Ref.
AARP Movies for Grownups Awards	January 27, 2009	Best Actress	Frances McDormand	Nominated	
AARP Movies for Grownups Awards	January 27, 2009	Best Supporting Actor	John Malkovich	Nominated	
AARP Movies for Grownups Awards	January 27, 2009	Best Screenwriter	Joel Coen and Ethan Coen	Nominated	
Art Directors Guild Awards	February 14, 2009	Excellence in Production Design for a Contemporary Film	Jess Gonchor	Nominated	
Artios Awards	November 2, 2009	Outstanding Achievement in Casting – Big Budget Feature – Comedy	Ellen Chenoweth	Nominated	
British Academy Film Awards	February 8, 2009	Best Original Screenplay	Joel Coen and Ethan Coen	Nominated	
British Academy Film Awards	February 8, 2009	Best Supporting Actor	Brad Pitt	Nominated	
British Academy Film Awards	February 8, 2009	Best Supporting Actress	Tilda Swinton	Nominated	
Critics' Choice Awards	January 8, 2009	Best Comedy	Burn After Reading	Nominated	
Detroit Film Critics Society	2008	Best Cast	Burn After Reading	Nominated	
Edgar Awards	April 30, 2009	Best Motion Picture Screenplay	Joel Coen and Ethan Coen	Nominated	
Empire Awards	March 29, 2009	Best Comedy	Burn After Reading	Nominated	
Golden Globe Awards	January 11, 2009	Best Motion Picture - Musical or Comedy	Burn After Reading	Nominated	
Golden Globe Awards	January 11, 2009	Best Actress in a Motion Picture - Musical or Comedy	Frances McDormand	Nominated	
Houston Film Critics Society	December 17, 2008	Best Actor in a Supporting Role	Brad Pitt	Nominated	
IndieWire Critics Poll	December 24, 2008	Best Screenplay	Joel Coen and Ethan Coen	3rd place	
International Film Music Critics Association Awards	February 18, 2009	Best Original Score for a Comedy Film	Carter Burwell	Won	
National Board of Review Awards	January 14, 2009	Top Ten Films	Burn After Reading	Won	
Russian Guild of Film Critics	December 25, 2008	Best Foreign Film	Burn After Reading	Nominated	
Russian National Movie Awards	2009	Best Independent Movie	Burn After Reading	Nominated	
St. Louis Film Critics Association	December 2008	Best Comedy	Burn After Reading	Won	
World Soundtrack Awards	October 17, 2009	Best Original Score of the Year	Carter Burwell	Nominated	
World Soundtrack Awards	October 17, 2009	Film Composer of the Year	Carter Burwell	Nominated	
Writers Guild of America Awards	February 7, 2009	Best Original Screenplay	Joel Coen and Ethan Coen	Nominated	

== See also ==
- List of films featuring fictional films
