= Art Directors Guild Awards 2019 =

Annual US film and television awards ceremony

24th Art Directors Guild Awards
- Date: February 1, 2020

The 24th Art Directors Guild Excellence in Production Design Awards took place on February 1, 2020, at the InterContinental Los Angeles Downtown, honoring the best production designers of 2019. The nominations were announced on December 9, 2019.

On November 26, 2019, Visual futurist Syd Mead was announced as the recipient of the 2019 William Cameron Menzies award. Mead died on December 30, 2019, and was given the award posthumously at the ceremony.

== Winners and nominees ==
=== Excellence in Production Design for Feature Film ===
Period Film:

- Barbara Ling – Once Upon a Time in Hollywood
  - François Audouy – Ford v Ferrari
  - Bob Shaw – The Irishman
  - Ra Vincent – Jojo Rabbit
  - Mark Friedberg – Joker
  - Dennis Gassner – 1917

Fantasy Film:

- Charles Wood – Avengers: Endgame
  - Kevin Thompson – Ad Astra
  - Gemma Jackson – Aladdin
  - Rick Heinrichs – Dumbo
  - Patrick Tatopoulos – Maleficent: Mistress of Evil
  - Rick Carter and Kevin Jenkins – Star Wars: The Rise of Skywalker

Contemporary Film:

- Lee Ha-Jun – Parasite
  - Jade Healy – A Beautiful Day in the Neighborhood
  - Kevin Kavanaugh – John Wick: Chapter 3 - Parabellum
  - David Crank – Knives Out
  - Ruth De Jong – Us

Animated Film:

- Bob Pauley – Toy Story 4
  - Max Boas – Abominable
  - Michael Giaimo – Frozen II
  - Pierre-Olivier Vincent – How to Train Your Dragon: The Hidden World
  - James Chinlund – The Lion King

=== Excellence in Production Design for Television ===
One-Hour Period or Fantasy Single-Camera Television Series:

- Bill Groom – The Marvelous Mrs. Maisel (for "Ep. 305, Ep. 308")
  - Bo Welch – A Series of Unfortunate Events (for "Penultimate Peril: Part 1")
  - Martin Childs – The Crown (for "Aberfan")
  - Andrew L. Jones – The Mandalorian (for "Chapter One")
  - Deborah Riley – Game of Thrones (for "The Bells")

One-Hour Contemporary Single-Camera Series:

- Mark Worthington – The Umbrella Academy (for “We Only See Each Other at Weddings and Funerals”)
  - John Paino – Big Little Lies (for “What Have They Done?” “The Bad Mother,” “I Want to Know”)
  - Dave Blass – The Boys (for “The Female of the Species”)
  - Kay Lee – Euphorua (for “The Trials and Tribulations of Trying to Pee While Depressed,” “And Salt the Earth Behind You”)
  - Elisabeth Williams – The Handmaid’s Tale (for “Mayday”)

Television Movie or Limited Series:

- Luke Hull – Chernobyl
  - Anne Beauchamp – Black Mirror: Striking Vipers
  - David Gropman – Catch-22
  - Maria Caso – Deadwood: The Movie
  - Alex DiGerlando – Fosse/Verdon

Half-Hour Single-Camera Television Series:

- Michael Bricker – Russian Doll (for "Nothing in This World Is Easy")
  - Tyler B. Robinson – Barry (for "ronny/lily")
  - Jonathan Paul Green – Fleabag (for “Ep. 5”)
  - Todd Fjelsted – GLOW (for "Up, Up, Up")
  - Ian Phillips – The Good Place (for "Employee of the Bearimy", "Help Is Other People")

Multi-Camera Television Series:

- John Shaffner – The Big Bang Theory (for "The Stockholm Syndrome", "The Conference Valuation", "The Propagation Proposition")
  - Stephan Olson – The Cool Kids (for "Vegas, Baby!")
  - Aiyanna Trotter – Family Reunion (for "Remember Black Elvis?")
  - Kristan Andrews – No Good Nick (for "The Italian Job")
  - Glenda Rovello – Will & Grace (for "Family, Trip", "The Things We Do for Love", "Conscious Coupling")

Short Format: Web Series, Music Video or Commercial:

- James Chinlund – MedMen ("The New Normal")
  - Alex DiGerlando – Portal for Facebook: A Very Muppet Portal Launch
  - Quito Cooksey – Apple ("It’s Tough Out There")
  - Emma Fairley – Ariana Grande, Miley Cyrus, Lana Del Rey ("Don't Call Me Angel")
  - Kurt Gefke – Taylor Swift ("Lover")

Variety or Competition Series / Awards or Event Special:

- Monica Sotto – Drunk History (for "Are You Afraid of the Drunk?")
  - David Korins – 91st Academy Awards
  - Jason Sherwood – Rent: Live
  - Keith Raywood, Akira Yoshimura, Joe DeTullio, Eugene Lee – Saturday Night Live (for "1764 Emma Stone," "1762 Sandra Oh," "1760 John Mulaney")
  - Tamlyn Wright, Baz Halpin – Taylor Swift's Reputation Stadium Tour

Special Awards

William Cameron Menzies Award - Syd Mead
