= Thérèse DePrez =

American production designer

- Born: February 17, 1965; Rochester, New York, U.S.
- Died: December 19, 2017 (aged 52); New York City, U.S.
- Education: Parsons School of Design
- Occupation: Production designer

Thérèse DePrez (February 17, 1965 – December 19, 2017) was an American production designer.

DePrez was born and raised in Rochester, New York, the daughter of Gene and Patricia DePrez. She cited her influences as being filmmaker/artist Jean Cocteau, filmmaker Georges Méliès and the films Dr. Strangelove and Blade Runner. While attending the Parsons School of Design in New York City, DePrez worked on several off-Broadway stage productions prior to being hired for her first film assignment in 1991's The Refrigerator.

Her work included the films Arlington Road, High Fidelity, How to Lose a Guy in 10 Days, Dark Water, Mr. Magorium's Wonder Emporium and Fighting.

In 2010, DePrez did the production design of the Darren Aronofsky thriller Black Swan. Aronofsky stated he had been attempting to collaborate with DePrez on many of his previous projects, but was unsuccessful until Swan. Her work on the film resulted in an Art Directors Guild Award and a nomination for the BAFTA Award for Best Production Design at the 64th British Academy Film Awards. Her final film credits included Premium Rush, Stoker, Out of the Furnace and The Drop. As well as film, she also worked on the set design for David Bowie's A Reality Tour in 2003.

DePrez was diagnosed with breast cancer in May 2015. A GoFundMe was set up by her friend Derrick Kardos. Initially cancer-free by March 2016, DePrez died of the disease on December 19, 2017, at the age of 52. She was included in the annual In Memoriam section of the 90th Academy Awards and received "Special Thanks To Thérèse DePrez (1965-2017)" in the closing credits of the 2019 film The Lodge.
