= Nathan Crowley =

British film production designer

- Born: 28 February 1966 (age 60); London, England
- Education: University of Brighton (BA)
- Occupation: Production designer
- Years active: 1991 – present

Nathan Crowley (born 28 February 1966) is an English production designer and a former art director, who is best known for his collaborations with Christopher Nolan. He has been nominated seven times for an Academy Award for Best Production Design for The Prestige (2006), The Dark Knight (2008), Interstellar (2014), Dunkirk (2017), First Man (2018), Tenet (2020), and Wicked (2024), for which he won.

For The Prestige, he was nominated with set decorator Julie Ochipinti, for The Dark Knight, he was nominated with set decorator Peter Lando, for Interstellar and Dunkirk, he was nominated with set decorator Gary Fettis, for First Man and Tenet, he was nominated with set decorator Kathy Lucas, and he was nominated with set decorator Lee Sandales for Wicked. Crowley was also nominated six times for the BAFTA Award for Best Production Design for Batman Begins (2005), The Dark Knight (2008), Interstellar (2014), Dunkirk (2017), First Man (2018) and Wicked (2024) for which he won.

== Early life and education ==
Crowley grew up in Islington, north London. His father was an architect, his mother was an artist, and his grandfather was a builder's merchant. Crowley attended Leighton Park School in Reading, Berkshire. After completing a foundation year at the Sir John Cass School of Art, he went on to graduate from Brighton Polytechnic (now the University of Brighton) with a Bachelor of Arts (BA) in Three dimensional design. He initially worked odd jobs in architecture.

== Filmography ==
=== As art director ===
- Dangerous Game (1993)
- Monkey Trouble (1994)
- Braveheart (1995)
- Assassins (1995)
- Mission: Impossible 2 (2000)

=== As production designer ===
- Sweety Barrett (1998)
- Falling for a Dancer (1998)
- An Everlasting Piece (2000)
- Behind Enemy Lines (2001)
- Insomnia (2002)
- Veronica Guerin (2003)
- Batman Begins (2005)
- The Lake House (2006)
- The Prestige (2006)
- The Dark Knight (2008)
- Public Enemies (2009)
- John Carter (2012)
- The Dark Knight Rises (2012)
- Interstellar (2014)
- Westworld (pilot episode only) (2016)
- Dunkirk (2017)
- The Greatest Showman (2017)
- First Man (2018)
- Tenet (2020)
- Ron's Gone Wrong (2021)
- Wonka (2023)
- Wicked (2024)
- Wicked: For Good (2025)

== Accolades ==
Award	Year	Film	Category	Result
Academy Awards	2006	The Prestige	Best Production Design	Nominated
Academy Awards	2008	The Dark Knight	Best Production Design	Nominated
Academy Awards	2014	Interstellar	Best Production Design	Nominated
Academy Awards	2017	Dunkirk	Best Production Design	Nominated
Academy Awards	2018	First Man	Best Production Design	Nominated
Academy Awards	2020	Tenet	Best Production Design	Nominated
Academy Awards	2024	Wicked	Best Production Design	Won
Art Directors Guild Awards	2005	Batman Begins	Excellence in Period/Fantasy Film	Nominated
Art Directors Guild Awards	2006	The Prestige	Excellence in Period Film	Nominated
Art Directors Guild Awards	2008	The Dark Knight	Excellence in Fantasy Film	Won
Art Directors Guild Awards	2009	Public Enemies	Excellence in Period Film	Nominated
Art Directors Guild Awards	2012	The Dark Knight Rises	Excellence in Fantasy Film	Nominated
Art Directors Guild Awards	2014	Interstellar	Excellence in Fantasy Film	Nominated
Art Directors Guild Awards	2016	Westworld (for "The Original")	Excellence for a One-Hour Period or Fantasy Single-Camera Series	Won
Art Directors Guild Awards	2017	Dunkirk	Excellence in Period Film	Nominated
Art Directors Guild Awards	2018	First Man	Excellence in Period Film	Nominated
Art Directors Guild Awards	2020	Tenet	Excellence in Fantasy Film	Won
British Academy Film Awards	2005	Batman Begins	Best Production Design	Nominated
British Academy Film Awards	2008	The Dark Knight	Best Production Design	Nominated
British Academy Film Awards	2014	Interstellar	Best Production Design	Nominated
British Academy Film Awards	2017	Dunkirk	Best Production Design	Nominated
British Academy Film Awards	2018	First Man	Best Production Design	Nominated
British Academy Film Awards	2024	Wicked	Best Production Design	Won
Critics' Choice Movie Awards	2014	Interstellar	Best Production Design	Nominated
Critics' Choice Movie Awards	2017	Dunkirk	Best Production Design	Nominated
Critics' Choice Movie Awards	2018	First Man	Best Production Design	Nominated
Critics' Choice Movie Awards	2020	Tenet	Best Production Design	Nominated
Critics' Choice Movie Awards	2025	Wicked	Best Production Design	Won
Satellite Awards	2009	Public Enemies	Best Art Direction and Production Design	Nominated
Satellite Awards	2012	The Dark Knight Rises	Best Art Direction and Production Design	Nominated
Satellite Awards	2017	Dunkirk	Best Art Direction and Production Design	Nominated
Satellite Awards	2018	First Man	Best Art Direction and Production Design	Nominated
Saturn Award	2014	Interstellar	Best Production Design	Won
Saturn Award	2020	Tenet	Best Production Design	Nominated
