= Alan MacDonald (production designer) =

British production designer (c. 1956–2017)

Alan MacDonald (c. 1956 – 30 August 2017) was a British production designer. He was best known for his work on The Queen (2006), which earned him nominations for the Art Directors Guild Award for Excellence in Production Design for a Contemporary Film and British Independent Film Award for Best Technical Achievement, and for the Rajasthan-set The Best Exotic Marigold Hotel (2012) which earned him a nomination for the Art Directors Guild Award for Excellence in Production Design for a Contemporary Film.

In 2013, he designed the sets for the Academy Award-nominated film Philomena. He had also been a production designer for a number of advertisements for global firms including Coca-Cola, Levi's, Microsoft, Mercedes-Benz and Volkswagen, and was the theatrical designer for Kylie Minogue's 2002 "KylieFever2002" tour.

== Filmography ==
- Absurd (1989) (short)
- Tunnel of Love (1991) (short)
- Man to Man (1992)
- Remembrance of Things Fast: True Stories Visual Lies (1994; Art Director)
- Love Is the Devil: Study for a Portrait of Francis Bacon (1998)
- Rogue Trader (1998)
- Nora (2000)
- The Jacket (2005)
- Kinky Boots (2005)
- The Queen (2006)
- The Edge of Love (2008)
- Chéri (2009)
- Tamara Drewe (2010)
- The Best Exotic Marigold Hotel (2012)
- Philomena (2013)
- The Best Exotic Marigold Hotel 2 (2015)
- The Program (2015)
- Sing Street (2016)
- Victoria & Abdul (2017)
- Mamma Mia! Here We Go Again (2018)

== Personal life and death ==
He suffered from bipolar disorder. MacDonald died by suicide at his Covent Garden home on 31 August 2017, after spending two weeks as an in-patient at the private Nightingale Hospital at a cost of £20,000. His last two film credits, Victoria & Abdul (2017) and Mamma Mia! Here We Go Again (2018), were dedicated to his memory.
