= Florencia Martin =

American production designer and set decorator

- Born: October 19, 1985 (age 40)
- Occupations: Production designer, set decorator
- Awards: The Art Directors Guild Award for Excellence in Production Design, The Satellite Award for Best Art Direction and Production Design, The Critics' Choice Movie Award for Best Production Design, BAFTA Award for Best Production Design
- Website: https://www.florenciamartin.com

Florencia Martin is an American production designer and set decorator. She was nominated for two Academy Awards in the category Best Production Design for the films Babylon and One Battle After Another.

At the 76th British Academy Film Awards, she won a BAFTA Award for Best Production Design. Her win was shared with Anthony Carlino.

== One Battle After Another and Record-Breaking Accolades ==
In 2025, Martin served as the production designer for the action-thriller One Battle After Another, her second feature film collaboration with director Paul Thomas Anderson. The production involved an extensive two-year scouting and design process throughout California and Texas to create a tactile and 360-degree environment for the actors. Notable set builds for the film included a 60-foot hand-hewn dirt tunnel constructed on a Los Angeles soundstage and the "Sensei’s Apartment" set, which was constructed inside a real perfumery in El Paso, Texas, featuring fully functional plumbing and electricity to facilitate actor improvisation.

By January 2026, Martin set a new record at the Art Directors Guild (ADG) Awards as the most-nominated individual in a single year, earning four nominations across feature film, commercials, and music videos. Her work on the film also earned her a second Academy Award nomination for Best Production Design at the 98th Oscars.

== Design Philosophy and Short Form Work ==
Martin’s design approach is characterized by intentional naturalism, often utilizing boots on the ground scouting to find authentic locations that she then manipulates or builds upon to reflect character depth. In addition to her feature film work, she is a frequent collaborator with directors Spike Jonze and Yorgos Lanthimos on high-profile commercial projects. Her 2025 short-form credits include the Prada Galleria Bag campaign starring Scarlett Johansson and the music video for Coldplay's "All My Love," both of which received 2026 ADG Award nominations.

== Selected filmography ==
- Babylon (2022)
- One Battle After Another (2025)
