= Art Directors Guild Awards 2006 =

Annual US film and television awards

11th Art Directors Guild Awards
- Date: February 17, 2007

The 11th Art Directors Guild Awards, given on 17 February 2007, honored the best art directors of 2006.

== Winners and nominees ==
=== Film ===
==== Contemporary ====
Casino Royale

- Babel
- The Da Vinci Code
- The Departed
- The Queen

==== Fantasy ====
Pan's Labyrinth (El laberinto del fauno)

- Ray Chan (art director), James Foster, Paul Inglis and Mike Stallion - Children of Men
- Bruce Crone, William Hawkins and William Ladd Skinner- Pirates of the Caribbean: Dead Man's Chest
- Superman Returns
- V for Vendetta

==== Period ====
Curse of the Golden Flower (Man cheng jin dai huang jin jia)

- Chris Burian-Mohr – Dreamgirls
- Jack G. Taylor – Flags of Our Fathers
- Robert Guerra and Miguel Lopez Castillo – The Good Shepherd
- Kevin Kavanaugh – The Prestige

=== Television ===
- Single Camera Series:
  - Joseph Bennett – Rome for Episode 1
- Multiple Camera Series:
  - John Sabato – Mad TV for Episode 1106
- Television Movie or Miniseries:
  - Stuart Wurtzel – Empire Falls
- Awards Show, Variety or Music Special, or Documentary:
  - Roy Christopher – 77th Academy Awards
- Commercial, Promo or PSA:
  - Jeremy Reed – Bud Light
