= David and Sandy Reynolds-Wasco =

Basit

David Wasco and Sandy Reynolds-Wasco are an American husband and wife duo who are production designers and art directors. They are best known for their frequent collaborations with director Quentin Tarantino films, as production designers for Reservoir Dogs (1992), Pulp Fiction (1994), Kill Bill: Volume 1 (2003), Kill Bill: Volume 2 (2004), and Inglourious Basterds (2009). They worked as production designer and set decorator, respectively, for La La Land (2016), for which they received numerous awards and nominations, including the Art Directors Guild Award for Excellence in Production Design for a Contemporary Film and Critics' Choice Movie Award for Best Art Direction, and won the Academy Award for Best Production Design at the 89th Academy Awards.
