= Michael Corenblith =

Production designer

- Born: 1951 (age 74–75); Texas, United States
- Occupations: Art director Production designer
- Years active: 1975-present

Michael Corenblith (born 1951) is an art director and production designer. He was nominated for two Academy Awards in the category for Best Art Direction.

== Selected filmography ==
- Apollo 13 (1995)
- How the Grinch Stole Christmas (2000)
