= Wynn Thomas =

American film production designer

Wynn Thomas is an American film production designer. Thomas is particularly associated with the films of Spike Lee. Thomas has been described as the first African-American production designer in motion pictures.

== Biography ==
Wynn Thomas studied for an MFA in Theater Design at Boston University. He spent many years working in theater before working alongside Richard Sylbert on The Cotton Club for director Francis Ford Coppola. Thomas designed theater sets for the Negro Ensemble Company, Arena Stage of Washington, D.C., the Great Lakes Shakespeare Company, and Joe Papp's Public Theatre. He was the recipient of an Academy Honorary Award at the 16th Annual Governors Awards in 2025. Thomas has designed the sets for 11 films by Spike Lee. He has also worked with the directors Tim Burton, Robert Townsend, Robert De Niro, and Ron Howard.

== Filmography ==
Year	Title	Production role	Director	Notes
1981	Heavy Metal	Background Artist	Jack Stokes	(segment "Den")
1981	CBS Children's Mystery Theatre	Production Designer	Robert Fuest	Episode: "Mystery at Fire Island"
1982	American Playhouse	Assistant Art Director	Lloyd Richards	Episode: "Medal of Honor Rag"
1984	Beat Street	Art Director	Stan Lathan	
1986	The Money Pit	Assistant Art Director	Richard Benjamin	
1986	She's Gotta Have It	Production Designer	Spike Lee	
1986	ABC Afterschool Specials	Production Designer	Thomas Schlamme	Episode: "The Gift of Amazing Grace"
1986	Brighton Beach Memoirs	Assistant Art Director	Gene Saks	
1987	Scared Stiff	Production Designer	Richard Friedman	As Wynn P. Thomas
1987	Eddie Murphy: Raw	Production Designer	Robert Townsend	
1988	School Daze	Production Designer	Spike Lee	
1988	Homeboy	Art Director	Michael Seresin	
1989	The Package	Art Director	Andrew Davis	
1989	Do the Right Thing	Production Designer	Spike Lee	
1990	Mo' Better Blues	Production Designer	Spike Lee	
1991	The Five Heartbeats	Production Designer	Robert Townsend	
1991	Jungle Fever	Production Designer	Spike Lee	
1992	Malcolm X	Production Designer	Spike Lee	
1993	A Bronx Tale	Production Designer	Robert De Niro	
1994	Crooklyn	Production Designer	Spike Lee	
1995	To Wong Foo Thanks for Everything, Julie Newmar	Production Designer	Beeban Kidron	
1996	Mars Attacks!	Production Designer	Tim Burton	
1997	Wag the Dog	Production Designer	Barry Levinson	
1998	He Got Game	Production Designer	Spike Lee	
1998	Witness to the Mob	Production Designer	Thaddeus O'Sullivan	TV Movie
1999	Analyze This	Production Designer	Harold Ramis	
2000	Keeping the Faith	Production Designer	Edward Norton	
2000	The Original Kings of Comedy	Production Designer	Spike Lee	As Wynn P. Thomas
2001	A Huey P. Newton Story	Production Designer	Spike Lee	Tv Movie
2001	A Beautiful Mind	Production Designer	Ron Howard	
2002	Analyze That	Production Designer	Harold Ramis	
2005	Cinderella Man	Production Designer	Ron Howard	
2006	Inside Man	Production Designer	Spike Lee	
2007	Breach	Production Designer	Billy Ray	
2008	Get Smart	Production Designer	Peter Segal	
2010	All Good Things	Production Designer	Andrew Jarecki	
2012	The Odd Life of Timothy Green	Production Designer	Peter Hedges	
2012	Made in Jersey	Production Designer	Mark Waters	4 Episodes
2013	Grudge Match	Production Designer	Peter Segal	
2014	How to Get Away with Murder	Production Designer	Michael Offer	Episode: "Pilot"
2016	War on Everyone	Production Designer	John Michael McDonagh	
2016	Almost Christmas	Production Designer	David E. Talbert	
2016	Hidden Figures	Production Designer	Theodore Melfi	
2018	Alex Strangelove	Production Designer	Craig Johnson	
2019	The Sun is Also a Star	Production Designer	Ry Russo-Young	
2019	Shaft	Production Designer	Tim Story	
2020	Da 5 Bloods	Production Designer	Spike Lee	
2021	King Richard	Production Designer	Reinaldo Marcus Green	
2022	Devotion	Production Designer	J. D. Dillard	
2023	80 for Brady	Production Designer	Kyle Marvin	
2023	Lawmen: Bass Reeves	Production Designer	Christina Alexandra Voros	TV Mini Series

== Legacy ==
Thomas's films were shown at the Museum of Modern Art (MOMA) in New York from June-July 2021 as part of a retrospective of his work.

MOMA praised his work as encompassing the "campy, candy-colored sci-fi sets" of Mars Attacks! to the "clubs, prison, and homes" of Malcolm X in his meticulous crafting of reality "for characters to inhabit in any era".

== See also ==
- Wynn Thomas at IMDb
