= James J. Murakami =

American art director and production designer (1931–2022)

- Born: June 4, 1931; Sacramento, California, U.S.
- Died: December 15, 2022 (aged 91); Los Angeles, California, U.S.
- Occupation: Art director
- Years active: 1978–2016

James J. Murakami (June 4, 1931 – December 15, 2022) was an American art director and production designer.

Murakami won an Emmy Award in 2006 for his work on the television series Deadwood.

In 2008, Murakami was nominated for an Academy Award for Best Art Direction for his work on the film Changeling (2008).

Murakami was recognized by the Art Directors Guild in 2018 as the recipient of the year's ADG Award for Lifetime Achievement.

Murakami worked on a number of Clint Eastwood films, including Invictus (2009), Hereafter (2010), and J. Edgar (2011).

Murakami died in Ronald Reagan UCLA Medical Center, Los Angeles on December 15, 2022, at the age of 91.

== Selected filmography ==
=== Films ===
- Apocalypse Now (1979)
- WarGames (1983)
- Midnight Run (1988)
- Beverly Hills Cop (1984)

Beverly Hills Cop II (1987)

- Unforgiven (1992)
- True Romance (1993)
- The Game (1997)
- The Scorpion King (2002)
- Rails & Ties (2007)
- Changeling (2008)
- Gran Torino (2008)
- Invictus (2009)
- Hereafter (2010)
- J. Edgar (2011)
- Trouble with the Curve (2012)
- American Sniper (2014)
- Sully (2016)

=== Television ===
- Battlestar Galactica (1978)
- Charmed (2000)
- Deadwood (2004–2005)
