= Arthur Max =

American production designer (born 1946)

- Born: May 1, 1946 (age 80); Manhattan, New York
- Occupations: Production designer, Art Director
- Years active: 1984-present

Arthur Max (born May 1, 1946) is an American production designer.

== Biography ==
A native New Yorker, Max began his career as a stage lighting designer in the music industry following graduation from New York University in the late 1960s. Those assignments included work at Bill Graham's music venue Fillmore East in the East Village of Manhattan, and the Woodstock Festival of 1969. During the following decade, he designed concert lighting and festival stages for many rock and jazz artists. He was Pink Floyd's lighting designer during the bands' tours in the US and worldwide in the early-1970s. After studying architecture in England (earning degrees in the early-1980s from the Polytechnic of Central London and the Royal College of Art), Max went on to do several architectural design projects in London including an award-winning lighting design for the stage of St John's Concert Hall, a former 18th Century church in the centre of Smith Square, Westminster, London.

He entered the British film industry as an assistant to several English production designers. First for Stuart Craig on Hugh Hudson's Greystoke: The Legend of Tarzan, Lord of the Apes and Cal (both 1984), then for Ashetton Gorton on Hudson's Revolution the following year. He commenced his own production design career in TV commercials for ten years from 1985 to 1995 (for such clients as Pepsi, Nike, Jeep, Coke and Levi's), which led to his ongoing associations with directors Scott and Fincher.

== Awards ==
Max has been nominated for four Academy Awards: once each for his Production Design work on Gladiator (2000), American Gangster (2007), The Martian (2015) and Napoleon (2023). In addition to his Oscar nominations, Max won several other honors for his production design on the film, including the BAFTA, the National Board of Review prize and the Broadcast Film Critics honor. He also collected two "Excellence in Production Design" Awards from the Art Directors Guild, the first for Gladiator and the second for The Martian. He was previously nominated for Black Hawk Down, Robin Hood, American Gangster, Prometheus and Panic Room. After The Martian, Max worked on All the Money in the World (2017) Exodus: Gods and Kings, The Counselor, Kingdom of Heaven, Robin Hood, Black Hawk Down and Body of Lies. His first job as a production designer was Fincher's 1995 thriller, Seven. More recently, he completed The Last Vermeer, which was based on a true story of art forgery, set in Holland just after World War II, and The Last Duel, a medieval drama made in France and Ireland. Subsequently, he worked on House of Gucci, filmed on location in Italy, and Napoleon, an historical epic about the rise and fall of Napoleon Buonaparte, made in Malta and the UK. His most recent project was Gladiator II, shot in Morocco and Malta, marking his 16th project with director Ridley Scott.

== Filmography ==
Year	Title	Director	Notes
1995	Seven	David Fincher	
1997	G.I. Jane	Ridley Scott	
2000	Gladiator	Ridley Scott	Won - Art Directors Guild Award for Excellence in Production Design for a Period or Fantasy Film; Nominated - Academy Award for Best Production Design; Won - BAFTA Award for Best Production Design; Won - Los Angeles Film Critics Association Award for Best Production Design
2001	Black Hawk Down	Ridley Scott	Nominated - Art Directors Guild Award for Excellence in Production Design for a Contemporary Film
2002	Panic Room	David Fincher	Nominated - Art Directors Guild Award for Excellence in Production Design for a Contemporary Film
2005	Kingdom of Heaven	Ridley Scott	Nominated - Satellite Award for Best Art Direction and Production Design
2007	American Gangster	Ridley Scott	Nominated - Academy Award for Best Art Direction; Nominated - Art Directors Guild Award for Excellence in Production Design for a Period Film
2008	Body of Lies	Ridley Scott	
2010	Robin Hood	Ridley Scott	Nominated - Art Directors Guild Award for Excellence in Production Design for a Period Film
2012	Prometheus	Ridley Scott	Nominated - Art Directors Guild Award for Excellence in Production Design for a Fantasy Film
2013	The Counselor	Ridley Scott	
2014	Exodus: Gods and Kings	Ridley Scott	
2015	The Martian	Ridley Scott	Won - Art Directors Guild Award for Excellence in Production Design for a Contemporary Film; Nominated - Academy Award for Best Production Design; Nominated - BAFTA Award for Best Production Design
2017	All the Money in the World	Ridley Scott	
2019	The Last Vermeer	Dan Friedkin	
2021	The Last Duel	Ridley Scott	
2021	House of Gucci	Ridley Scott	Nominated - Set Decorators Society of America Award for Best Achievement in Decor/Design of a Period Feature Film
2023	Napoleon	Ridley Scott	Nominated - Academy Award for Best Production Design; Nominated - Art Directors Guild Award for Excellence in Production Design for a Period Film; Nominated - Satellite Award for Best Art Direction and Production Design; Nominated - Set Decorators Society of America Award for Best Achievement in Decor/Design of a Period Feature Film.
2024	Gladiator II	Ridley Scott	Won - British Film Designers Guild Award - Major Motion Picture - Period; Won - 29th Satellite Awards - Best Art Direction and Production Design
