= Donald Graham Burt =

American production designer

- Occupation: production designer
- Years active: 1993-present

Donald Graham Burt is an American production designer. He has worked on multiple films including The Joy Luck Club, Dangerous Minds, and Donnie Brasco, as well as with David Fincher on Zodiac in 2007. In 2008, he designed the sets for The Curious Case of Benjamin Button which won an Academy Award for Best Art Direction in 2009, an Art Directors Guild Award for Best Achievement in Art Direction, and a BAFTA Film Award for Best Production Design, along with receiving a nomination for a Satellite Award for Best Art Direction & Production Design. In 2020, Burt won an Academy Award for David Fincher's black-and-white biographical drama film Mank.

Burt is a 1976 graduate of Independence (Kansas) High School and studied art at the University of Arizona. His father was a pastor and his mother was a homemaker. Before employment in the film industry, he worked as a night janitor in a small scene shop in Phoenix.

== Filmography ==
- The Further Mis-Adventures of Cliff Booth (2026)
- The Killer (2023)
- Mank (2020)
- Outlaw King (2018)
- Hostiles (2017)
- Gone Girl (2014)
- The Girl with the Dragon Tattoo (2011)
- The Social Network (2010)
- The Curious Case of Benjamin Button (2008)
- It Might Get Loud (2008)
- Zodiac (2007)
- In an Instant (2005)
- Because of Winn-Dixie (2005)
- White Oleander (2002)
- The Center of the World (2001)
- Anywhere But Here (1999)
- A Cool, Dry Place (1998)
- Donnie Brasco (1997)
- Kazaam (1996)
- Dangerous Minds (1995)
- The Joy Luck Club (1993)

== Awards & nomination ==
- 2009 Academy Award for Best Art Direction
- 2009 Art Directors Guild Award for Best Achievement in Art Direction
- 2009 BAFTA Film Award for Best Production Design
- 2009 Satellite Award nomination for Best Art Direction & Production Design
- 2021 Academy Award for Best Production Design
