= David Gropman =

American production designer

- Born: David Lloyd Gropman; June 16, 1952 (age 73); Los Angeles, California, U.S.
- Occupation: Production designer

David Lloyd Gropman (born June 16, 1952) is an American production designer. He was nominated for two Academy Awards in the category Best Production Design for the films The Cider House Rules and Life of Pi.

Gropman also works in the theatre, and was the scenic designed for 10 Broadway shows: The 1940's Radio Hour (1979), Billy Bishop Goes to War (1980), Passione (1980), Lena Horne: The Lady and Her Music (1981), Mass Appeal (1981), Come Back to the 5 & Dime Jimmy Dean, Jimmy Dean (1982), A Little Family Business (1982), Open Admissions (1984), Death and the King's Horseman (1987), and The Comedy of Errors (1987). Gropman also worked Off-Broadway, designing productions at the Promenade Theatre, Circle in the Square Theatre, the Provincetown Playhouse in Manhattan, The Public Theater, the Lucille Lortel Theatre, Playwrights Horizons, and Manhattan Theatre Club's Stage 73 between 1979 and 1985.

== Selected filmography ==
- The Cider House Rules (1999; co-nominated with Beth Rubino)
- Life of Pi (2012; co-nominated with Anna Pinnock)
