= Judy Becker =

American production designer

- Occupation: production designer
- Years active: 1989-present
- Spouse: Michael Taylor (?-present)

Judy Becker is an American production designer.

She was nominated for two Academy Awards for Best Production Design for her work in the films American Hustle (shared with Heather Loeffler) and The Brutalist (shared with Patricia Cuccia).

Her husband Michael Taylor is a film editor and a script supervisor.
