= Gemma Jackson =

British production designer

- Born: 1951 (age 74–75); Guildford, Surrey, England, UK
- Occupations: Art director and Production designer
- Years active: 1984-present
- Spouse: Andrew McAlpine

Gemma Jackson is a British production designer who has worked on both television and film. She has won two Emmys, one for the television show Game of Thrones and the other for the mini-series John Adams.

She was nominated at the 77th Academy Awards in the category of Best Art Direction for her work on the film Finding Neverland. She shared her nomination with Trisha Edwards.

She is married to production designer Andrew McAlpine.

== Selected filmography ==
=== Film ===
- The Girl in the Picture (1985)
- Paperhouse (1988)
- Chicago Joe and the Showgirl (1990)
- The Miracle (1991)
- Blame It on the Bellboy (1992)
- A Far Off Place (1993)
- Squanto: A Warrior's Tale (1994)
- Tom and Huck (1995)
- The Borrowers (1997)
- Whatever Happened to Harold Smith? (1999)
- Bridget Jones's Diary (2001)
- Iris (2001)
- Killing Me Softly (2002)
- Finding Neverland (2004)
- Bridget Jones: The Edge of Reason (2004)
- Death Defying Acts (2007)
- The Other Man (2008)
- King Arthur: Legend of the Sword (2017)
- Aladdin (2019)
- The Gentlemen (2019)
- The Outfit (2022)
- Lee (2023 Film)
- My Duchess ( 2025 film)
- Eloise ( 2026 film)

=== Television ===
- John Adams (2008)
- Game of Thrones (2011-2013) (23 episodes)
- The Nevers (2021-2022)
- . Death by Lightening mini series (2024-2025)
