= Jess Gonchor =

American art director (born 1962)

- Born: July 15, 1962 (age 63); New York City, New York, USA
- Occupation: Art director
- Years active: 1993-present

Jess Gonchor (born July 15, 1962, in New York City) is an American art director who was nominated with Nancy Haigh for an Academy Award for Best Art Direction at the 83rd Academy Awards for True Grit (2010). In 2017, he received his second Academy Award nomination for Hail, Caesar! (2016) at the 89th Academy Awards.

He has worked with The Coen Brothers since No Country for Old Men (2007).

== Selected filmography ==
- White Noise (2022)
- A Quiet Place Part II (2021)
- Little Women (2019)
- The Ballad of Buster Scruggs (2018)
- Live by Night (2016)
- Hail, Caesar! (2016)
- Foxcatcher (2014)
- Inside Llewyn Davis (2013)
- The Lone Ranger (2013)
- Moneyball (2011)
- True Grit (2010)
- A Serious Man (2009)
- Burn After Reading (2008)
- No Country for Old Men (2007)
- The Devil Wears Prada (2006)
- Capote (2005)
- The Last Samurai (2003)
- Kate & Leopold (2001)
- Autumn in New York (2000)
- The Siege (1998)
- The Crucible (1996)
- The American President (1995)
- A Perfect World (1993)
- Teenage Mutant Ninja Turtles III (1993)
