= List of Academy Award winners and nominees from Great Britain =

This article is a list of British people working in the mainstream and independent cinema industry of Great Britain (England, Scotland and Wales) who have been nominated for or have won an Academy Award.

== Best Actor in a Leading Role ==
Year	Name	Film	Status	Notes
1927–28	Charles Chaplin	The Circus	Nominated	Chaplin was originally nominated in this category (and three others) for The Circus, but the academy took him out of the running and gave him a Special Award.
1929–30	George Arliss	Disraeli	Won	First British actor to win an Academy Award.
1929–30	George Arliss	The Green Goddess	Nominated	
1929–30	Ronald Colman	Bulldog Drummond	Nominated	
1929–30	Ronald Colman	Condemned	Nominated	
1932–33	Charles Laughton	The Private Life of Henry VIII	Won	
1932–33	Leslie Howard	Berkeley Square	Nominated	
1935	Victor McLaglen	The Informer	Won	
1935	Charles Laughton	Mutiny on the Bounty	Nominated	
1938	Leslie Howard	Pygmalion	Nominated	
1938	Robert Donat	The Citadel	Nominated	
1939	Robert Donat	Goodbye, Mr. Chips	Won	
1939	Laurence Olivier	Wuthering Heights	Nominated	
1940	Laurence Olivier	Rebecca	Nominated	
1940	Charles Chaplin	The Great Dictator	Nominated	
1941	Cary Grant	Penny Serenade	Nominated	
1942	Ronald Colman	Random Harvest	Nominated	
1944	Cary Grant	None but the Lonely Heart	Nominated	
1945	Ray Milland	The Lost Weekend	Won	Milland was born in Neath, Glamorgan, Wales.
1946	Laurence Olivier	Henry V	Nominated	
1947	Michael Redgrave	Mourning Becomes Electra	Nominated	
1947	Ronald Colman	A Double Life	Won	
1948	Laurence Olivier	Hamlet	Won	
1949	Richard Todd	The Hasty Heart	Nominated	Todd was an Irish-born British actor.
1952	Alec Guinness	The Lavender Hill Mob	Nominated	
1953	Richard Burton	The Robe	Nominated	
1956	Laurence Olivier	Richard III	Nominated	
1957	Alec Guinness	The Bridge on the River Kwai	Won	
1957	Charles Laughton	Witness for the Prosecution	Nominated	
1958	David Niven	Separate Tables	Won	
1959	Laurence Harvey	Room at the Top	Nominated	Harvey was a Lithuanian-born South African-British actor.
1960	Laurence Olivier	The Entertainer	Nominated	
1960	Trevor Howard	Sons and Lovers	Nominated	
1962	Peter O'Toole	Lawrence of Arabia	Nominated	O'Toole was a British-Irish actor.
1963	Albert Finney	Tom Jones	Nominated	
1963	Rex Harrison	Cleopatra	Nominated	
1964	Rex Harrison	My Fair Lady	Won	Harrison recreated his Tony Award-winning role from musical of the same name.
1964	Peter Sellers	Dr. Strangelove	Nominated	
1964	Peter O'Toole	Becket	Nominated	
1964	Richard Burton	Becket	Nominated	
1965	Richard Burton	The Spy Who Came in from the Cold	Nominated	
1965	Laurence Olivier	Othello	Nominated	
1966	Richard Burton	Who's Afraid of Virginia Woolf?	Nominated	
1966	Michael Caine	Alfie	Nominated	
1966	Paul Scofield	A Man for All Seasons	Won	Scofield recreated his Tony Award-winning role from play of the same name.
1968	Ron Moody	Oliver!	Nominated	Moody recreated his Tony Award-Nominated role from musical of the same name.
1968	Alan Bates	The Fixer	Nominated	
1968	Peter O'Toole	The Lion in Winter	Nominated	
1969	Richard Burton	Anne of the Thousand Days	Nominated	
1969	Peter O'Toole	Goodbye, Mr. Chips	Nominated	
1971	Peter Finch	Sunday Bloody Sunday	Nominated	Finch was an English-born Australian actor.
1972	Peter O'Toole	The Ruling Class	Nominated	
1972	Michael Caine	Sleuth	Nominated	
1972	Laurence Olivier	Sleuth	Nominated	
1974	Albert Finney	Murder on the Orient Express	Nominated	
1976	Peter Finch	Network	Won	Posthumous win.
1977	Richard Burton	Equus	Nominated	
1978	Laurence Olivier	The Boys from Brazil	Nominated	
1979	Peter Sellers	Being There	Nominated	
1980	Peter O'Toole	The Stunt Man	Nominated	
1980	John Hurt	The Elephant Man	Nominated	
1981	Dudley Moore	Arthur	Nominated	
1982	Ben Kingsley	Gandhi	Won	
1982	Peter O'Toole	My Favorite Year	Nominated	
1983	Tom Conti	Reuben, Reuben	Nominated	
1983	Michael Caine	Educating Rita	Nominated	
1983	Tom Courtenay	The Dresser	Nominated	
1983	Albert Finney	The Dresser	Nominated	
1984	Albert Finney	Under the Volcano	Nominated	
1986	Bob Hoskins	Mona Lisa	Nominated	
1989	Kenneth Branagh	Henry V	Nominated	Film debut performance. First Northern Irish nominee.
1989	Daniel Day-Lewis	My Left Foot	Won	Day-Lewis is an English-born actor with joint British/Irish citizenship.
1990	Jeremy Irons	Reversal of Fortune	Won	
1991	Anthony Hopkins	The Silence of the Lambs	Won	Hopkins was born in Margam, Glamorgan, Wales.
1992	Stephen Rea	The Crying Game	Nominated	
1993	Anthony Hopkins	The Remains of the Day	Nominated	
1993	Daniel Day-Lewis	In the Name of the Father	Nominated	
1994	Nigel Hawthorne	The Madness of King George	Nominated	
1995	Anthony Hopkins	Nixon	Nominated	
1996	Ralph Fiennes	The English Patient	Nominated	
1998	Ian McKellen	Gods and Monsters	Nominated	
2001	Tom Wilkinson	In the Bedroom	Nominated	
2002	Michael Caine	The Quiet American	Nominated	
2002	Daniel Day-Lewis	Gangs of New York	Nominated	
2003	Jude Law	Cold Mountain	Nominated	
2003	Ben Kingsley	House of Sand and Fog	Nominated	
2006	Peter O'Toole	Venus	Nominated	
2007	Daniel Day-Lewis	There Will Be Blood	Won	
2009	Colin Firth	A Single Man	Nominated	
2010	Colin Firth	The King's Speech	Won	
2011	Gary Oldman	Tinker Tailor Soldier Spy	Nominated	
2012	Daniel Day-Lewis	Lincoln	Won	
2013	Christian Bale	American Hustle	Nominated	Though born in Wales, Bale and his family moved to England when he was 1 year old.
2013	Chiwetel Ejiofor	12 Years a Slave	Nominated	First black English actor to be nominated for Best Actor.
2014	Benedict Cumberbatch	The Imitation Game	Nominated	
2014	Eddie Redmayne	The Theory of Everything	Won	
2015	Eddie Redmayne	The Danish Girl	Nominated	
2016	Andrew Garfield	Hacksaw Ridge	Nominated	Garfield is a British-American actor.
2017	Daniel Day-Lewis	Phantom Thread	Nominated	
2017	Gary Oldman	Darkest Hour	Won	
2017	Daniel Kaluuya	Get Out	Nominated	
2018	Christian Bale	Vice	Nominated	
2019	Jonathan Pryce	The Two Popes	Nominated	
2020	Riz Ahmed	Sound of Metal	Nominated	First British Muslim actor to be nominated for Best Actor.
2020	Anthony Hopkins	The Father	Won	At age 83, Hopkins became the oldest Best Actor winner.
2020	Gary Oldman	Mank	Nominated	
2021	Benedict Cumberbatch	The Power of the Dog	Nominated	
2021	Andrew Garfield	Tick, Tick... Boom!	Nominated	
2022	Bill Nighy	Living	Nominated	
2024	Ralph Fiennes	Conclave	Nominated	

== Best Actress in a Leading Role ==
Year	Name	Film	Status	Notes
1931–32	Lynn Fontanne	The Guardsman	Nominated	
1932–33	Diana Wynyard	Cavalcade	Nominated	
1935	Merle Oberon	The Dark Angel	Nominated	Oberon was an Indian-born English actress.
1938	Wendy Hiller	Pygmalion	Nominated	
1939	Vivien Leigh	Gone with the Wind	Won	Leigh was an Indian-born English actress.
1939	Greer Garson	Goodbye, Mr. Chips	Nominated	
1940	Joan Fontaine	Rebecca	Nominated	Fontaine was a Japanese-born English actress.
1941	Joan Fontaine	Suspicion	Won	
1941	Greer Garson	Blossoms in the Dust	Nominated	
1941	Olivia de Havilland	Hold Back the Dawn	Nominated	de Havilland was a Japanese-born British-American actress.
1942	Greer Garson	Mrs. Miniver	Won	
1943	Joan Fontaine	The Constant Nymph	Nominated	
1943	Greer Garson	Madame Curie	Nominated	
1944	Greer Garson	Mrs. Parkington	Nominated	
1945	Greer Garson	The Valley of Decision	Nominated	Garson is one of only two actresses to receive five consecutive nominations (tied with Bette Davis).
1946	Olivia de Havilland	To Each His Own	Won	
1946	Celia Johnson	Brief Encounter	Nominated	
1948	Olivia de Havilland	The Snake Pit	Nominated	
1949	Olivia de Havilland	The Heiress	Won	de Havilland was the first of three British actresses to win this award twice (tied with Vivien Leigh, Glenda Jackson).
1949	Deborah Kerr	Edward, My Son	Nominated	Kerr is a Scottish-born actress, raised partially in England.
1951	Vivien Leigh	A Streetcar Named Desire	Won	
1953	Deborah Kerr	From Here to Eternity	Nominated	
1953	Audrey Hepburn	Roman Holiday	Won	Hepburn was a Belgian-born English actress.
1954	Audrey Hepburn	Sabrina	Nominated	
1956	Deborah Kerr	The King and I	Nominated	
1957	Deborah Kerr	Heaven Knows, Mr. Allison	Nominated	
1957	Elizabeth Taylor	Raintree County	Nominated	
1958	Deborah Kerr	Separate Tables	Nominated	
1958	Elizabeth Taylor	Cat on a Hot Tin Roof	Nominated	
1959	Audrey Hepburn	The Nun's Story	Nominated	
1959	Elizabeth Taylor	Suddenly, Last Summer	Nominated	
1960	Deborah Kerr	The Sundowners	Nominated	
1960	Greer Garson	Sunrise at Campobello	Nominated	Garson has more Best Actress nominations than any other British actress (with seven).
1960	Elizabeth Taylor	BUtterfield 8	Won	Taylor was British-American.
1961	Audrey Hepburn	Breakfast at Tiffany's	Nominated	
1963	Rachel Roberts	This Sporting Life	Nominated	
1964	Julie Andrews	Mary Poppins	Won	Andrews' debut performance.
1965	Julie Christie	Darling	Won	Christie is an Indian-born English actress.
1965	Julie Andrews	The Sound of Music	Nominated	
1965	Samantha Eggar	The Collector	Nominated	
1966	Lynn Redgrave	Georgy Girl	Nominated	
1966	Vanessa Redgrave	Morgan	Nominated	
1966	Elizabeth Taylor	Who's Afraid of Virginia Woolf?	Won	
1967	Audrey Hepburn	Wait Until Dark	Nominated	
1967	Edith Evans	The Whisperers	Nominated	
1968	Vanessa Redgrave	Isadora	Nominated	
1969	Maggie Smith	The Prime of Miss Jean Brodie	Won	Smith is the first and only British actress to date to win in both acting categories (Best Actress and Best Supporting Actress).
1969	Jean Simmons	The Happy Ending	Nominated	
1970	Glenda Jackson	Women in Love	Won	
1970	Sarah Miles	Ryan's Daughter	Nominated	
1971	Janet Suzman	Nicholas and Alexandra	Nominated	Suzman is a South African/British actress.
1971	Julie Christie	McCabe & Mrs. Miller	Nominated	
1971	Glenda Jackson	Sunday Bloody Sunday	Nominated	
1971	Vanessa Redgrave	Mary, Queen of Scots	Nominated	
1972	Maggie Smith	Travels with My Aunt	Nominated	
1973	Glenda Jackson	A Touch of Class	Won	
1975	Glenda Jackson	Hedda	Nominated	
1982	Julie Andrews	Victor/Victoria	Nominated	
1983	Julie Walters	Educating Rita	Nominated	
1989	Pauline Collins	Shirley Valentine	Nominated	
1989	Jessica Tandy	Driving Miss Daisy	Won	
1992	Emma Thompson	Howards End	Won	
1993	Emma Thompson	The Remains of the Day	Nominated	
1994	Miranda Richardson	Tom and Viv	Nominated	
1995	Emma Thompson	Sense and Sensibility	Nominated	
1996	Brenda Blethyn	Secrets & Lies	Nominated	
1996	Kristin Scott Thomas	The English Patient	Nominated	
1996	Emily Watson	Breaking the Waves	Nominated	
1997	Helena Bonham Carter	The Wings of the Dove	Nominated	
1997	Julie Christie	Afterglow	Nominated	
1997	Judi Dench	Mrs Brown	Nominated	
1997	Kate Winslet	Titanic	Nominated	At age 22, Winslet became the fourth-youngest Best Actress nominee at the time in the category.
1998	Emily Watson	Hilary and Jackie	Nominated	
1999	Janet McTeer	Tumbleweeds	Nominated	
1999	Julianne Moore	The End of the Affair	Nominated	Moore is an American–British actress.
2001	Judi Dench	Iris	Nominated	
2002	Julianne Moore	Far from Heaven	Nominated	
2003	Samantha Morton	In America	Nominated	
2003	Naomi Watts	21 Grams	Nominated	
2004	Imelda Staunton	Vera Drake	Nominated	
2004	Kate Winslet	Eternal Sunshine of the Spotless Mind	Nominated	
2005	Judi Dench	Mrs Henderson Presents	Nominated	
2005	Keira Knightley	Pride and Prejudice	Nominated	At age 20, Knightley became the fourth-youngest Best Actress nominee at the time in the category.
2006	Judi Dench	Notes on a Scandal	Nominated	
2006	Helen Mirren	The Queen	Won	
2006	Kate Winslet	Little Children	Nominated	
2007	Julie Christie	Away from Her	Nominated	
2008	Kate Winslet	The Reader	Won	
2009	Helen Mirren	The Last Station	Nominated	
2009	Carey Mulligan	An Education	Nominated	
2012	Naomi Watts	The Impossible	Nominated	
2013	Judi Dench	Philomena	Nominated	
2014	Felicity Jones	The Theory of Everything	Nominated	
2014	Rosamund Pike	Gone Girl	Nominated	
2014	Julianne Moore	Still Alice	Won	
2015	Charlotte Rampling	45 Years	Nominated	
2017	Sally Hawkins	The Shape of Water	Nominated	
2018	Olivia Colman	The Favourite	Won	
2019	Cynthia Erivo	Harriet	Nominated	First black English actress to be nominated for Best Actress.
2020	Carey Mulligan	Promising Young Woman	Nominated	
2020	Vanessa Kirby	Pieces of a Woman	Nominated	
2021	Olivia Colman	The Lost Daughter	Nominated	
2022	Andrea Riseborough	To Leslie	Nominated	
2023	Carey Mulligan	Maestro	Nominated	
2024	Cynthia Erivo	Wicked	Nominated	

== Best Actor in a Supporting Role ==
Year	Name	Film	Status	Notes
1936	Basil Rathbone	Romeo and Juliet	Nominated	
1937	H. B. Warner	Lost Horizon	Nominated	
1937	Roland Young	Topper	Nominated	
1938	Basil Rathbone	If I Were King	Nominated	
1938	Robert Morley	Marie Antoinette	Nominated	
1939	Brian Aherne	Juarez	Nominated	
1939	Claude Rains	Mr. Smith Goes to Washington	Nominated	
1940	James Stephenson	The Letter	Nominated	
1941	Donald Crisp	How Green Was My Valley	Won	
1941	Sydney Greenstreet	The Maltese Falcon	Nominated	
1942	Henry Travers	Mrs. Miniver	Nominated	
1943	Claude Rains	Casablanca	Nominated	
1944	Claude Rains	Mr. Skeffington	Nominated	
1946	Claude Rains	Notorious	Nominated	
1947	Edmund Gwenn	Miracle on 34th Street	Won	
1949	Ralph Richardson	The Heiress	Nominated	
1950	George Sanders	All About Eve	Won	
1950	Edmund Gwenn	Mister 880	Nominated	
1951	Leo Genn	Quo Vadis	Nominated	
1951	Peter Ustinov	Quo Vadis	Nominated	
1952	Victor McLaglen	The Quiet Man	Nominated	
1952	Richard Burton	My Cousin Rachel	Nominated	
1959	Hugh Griffith	Ben-Hur	Won	
1960	Peter Ustinov	Spartacus	Won	
1962	Terence Stamp	Billy Budd	Nominated	
1963	Hugh Griffith	Tom Jones	Nominated	
1964	Peter Ustinov	Topkapi	Won	
1964	John Gielgud	Becket	Nominated	
1964	Stanley Holloway	My Fair Lady	Nominated	Holloway recreated his Tony Award-nominated role from musical of the same name.
1965	Tom Courtenay	Doctor Zhivago	Nominated	
1965	Frank Finlay	Othello	Nominated	
1965	Ian Bannen	The Flight of the Phoenix	Nominated	
1966	Robert Shaw	A Man for All Seasons	Nominated	
1966	James Mason	Georgy Girl	Nominated	
1968	Jack Wild	Oliver!	Nominated	At age 16, Wild became the fourth-youngest nominee in the category.
1968	Daniel Massey	Star!	Nominated	
1969	Anthony Quayle	Anne of the Thousand Days	Nominated	
1970	John Mills	Ryan's Daughter	Won	
1973	John Houseman	The Paper Chase	Won	Houseman was a Romanian-born British-American actor and producer.
1976	Laurence Olivier	Marathon Man	Nominated	
1977	Peter Firth	Equus	Nominated	
1977	Alec Guinness	Star Wars	Nominated	
1978	John Hurt	Midnight Express	Nominated	
1981	John Gielgud	Arthur	Won	
1981	Ian Holm	Chariots of Fire	Nominated	
1982	James Mason	The Verdict	Nominated	
1984	Ralph Richardson	Greystoke: The Legend of Tarzan, Lord of the Apes	Nominated	
1986	Denholm Elliott	A Room with a View	Nominated	
1986	Michael Caine	Hannah and Her Sisters	Won	
1987	Sean Connery	The Untouchables	Won	Connery is the first and only Scottish actor to win an Academy Award for acting.
1988	Alec Guinness	Little Dorrit	Nominated	
1991	Ben Kingsley	Bugsy	Nominated	
1992	Jaye Davidson	The Crying Game	Nominated	First black British actor to be nominated for an Academy Award.
1993	Ralph Fiennes	Schindler's List	Nominated	
1993	Pete Postlethwaite	In the Name of the Father	Nominated	
1994	Paul Scofield	Quiz Show	Nominated	
1995	Tim Roth	Rob Roy	Nominated	
1997	Anthony Hopkins	Amistad	Nominated	
1999	Michael Caine	The Cider House Rules	Won	
1999	Jude Law	The Talented Mr. Ripley	Nominated	
2000	Albert Finney	Erin Brockovich	Nominated	
2001	Jim Broadbent	Iris	Won	
2001	Ben Kingsley	Sexy Beast	Nominated	
2001	Ian McKellen	The Lord of the Rings: The Fellowship of the Ring	Nominated	
2004	Clive Owen	Closer	Nominated	
2007	Tom Wilkinson	Michael Clayton	Nominated	
2010	Christian Bale	The Fighter	Won	Born in Wales to English parents, Bale and his family moved to England when he was 1 year old.
2011	Kenneth Branagh	My Week with Marilyn	Nominated	
2015	Christian Bale	The Big Short	Nominated	
2015	Tom Hardy	The Revenant	Nominated	
2015	Mark Rylance	Bridge of Spies	Won	
2016	Dev Patel	Lion	Nominated	
2018	Richard E. Grant	Can You Ever Forgive Me?	Nominated	Grant is a Swazi-born English actor.
2019	Anthony Hopkins	The Two Popes	Nominated	
2020	Sacha Baron Cohen	The Trial of the Chicago 7	Nominated	
2020	Daniel Kaluuya	Judas and the Black Messiah	Won	Kaluuya is the first black British actor to win an Academy Award for acting. At age 32, Kaluuya became the seventh-youngest winner to win an Academy Award in the category.
2024	Guy Pearce	The Brutalist	Nominated	Pearce is a British-Australian actor.
2025	Delroy Lindo	Sinners	Nominated	Lindo is a British-born American actor.

== Best Actress in a Supporting Role ==
Year	Name	Film	Status	Notes
1937	May Whitty	Night Must Fall	Nominated	
1939	Olivia de Havilland	Gone with the Wind	Nominated	
1940	Judith Anderson	Rebecca	Nominated	Anderson was an Australian-born British actress.
1941	Margaret Wycherly	Sergeant York	Nominated	
1942	May Whitty	Mrs. Miniver	Nominated	
1942	Gladys Cooper	Now, Voyager	Nominated	
1943	Gladys Cooper	The Song of Bernadette	Nominated	
1944	Angela Lansbury	Gaslight	Nominated	
1945	Angela Lansbury	The Picture of Dorian Gray	Nominated	
1946	Flora Robson	Saratoga Trunk	Nominated	
1948	Jean Simmons	Hamlet	Nominated	
1949	Elsa Lanchester	Come to the Stable	Nominated	
1957	Elsa Lanchester	Witness for the Prosecution	Nominated	
1958	Wendy Hiller	Separate Tables	Won	
1959	Hermione Baddeley	Room at the Top	Nominated	
1960	Glynis Johns	The Sundowners	Nominated	
1960	Mary Ure	Sons and Lovers	Nominated	
1962	Angela Lansbury	The Manchurian Candidate	Nominated	
1963	Margaret Rutherford	The V.I.P.s	Won	
1963	Edith Evans	Tom Jones	Nominated	
1963	Joyce Redman	Tom Jones	Nominated	
1964	Gladys Cooper	My Fair Lady	Nominated	
1964	Edith Evans	The Chalk Garden	Nominated	
1965	Joyce Redman	Othello	Nominated	
1965	Maggie Smith	Othello	Nominated	
1966	Wendy Hiller	A Man for All Seasons	Nominated	
1966	Vivien Merchant	Alfie	Nominated	
1969	Susannah York	They Shoot Horses, Don't They?	Nominated	
1971	Margaret Leighton	The Go-Between	Nominated	
1977	Vanessa Redgrave	Julia	Won	
1978	Maggie Smith	California Suite	Won	
1980	Eva Le Gallienne	Resurrection	Nominated	
1984	Peggy Ashcroft	A Passage to India	Won	
1986	Maggie Smith	A Room with a View	Nominated	
1991	Jessica Tandy	Fried Green Tomatoes	Nominated	
1992	Joan Plowright	Enchanted April	Nominated	
1992	Vanessa Redgrave	Howards End	Nominated	
1992	Miranda Richardson	Damage	Nominated	
1993	Emma Thompson	In the Name of the Father	Nominated	
1994	Rosemary Harris	Tom & Viv	Nominated	
1994	Helen Mirren	The Madness of King George	Nominated	
1995	Kate Winslet	Sense and Sensibility	Nominated	
1996	Marianne Jean-Baptiste	Secrets & Lies	Nominated	First Black English actress to be nominated for Best Supporting Actress.
1997	Julianne Moore	Boogie Nights	Nominated	Moore is an American–British actress.
1997	Minnie Driver	Good Will Hunting	Nominated	
1998	Brenda Blethyn	Little Voice	Nominated	
1998	Judi Dench	Shakespeare in Love	Won	
1998	Lynn Redgrave	Gods and Monsters	Nominated	
1999	Samantha Morton	Sweet and Lowdown	Nominated	
2000	Judi Dench	Chocolat	Nominated	
2000	Julie Walters	Billy Elliot	Nominated	
2001	Helen Mirren	Gosford Park	Nominated	
2001	Maggie Smith	Gosford Park	Nominated	
2001	Kate Winslet	Iris	Nominated	
2002	Julianne Moore	The Hours	Nominated	
2002	Catherine Zeta-Jones	Chicago	Won	Zeta-Jones was born as Catherine Zeta Jones in Swansea, Wales.
2004	Sophie Okonedo	Hotel Rwanda	Nominated	
2005	Rachel Weisz	The Constant Gardener	Won	
2007	Tilda Swinton	Michael Clayton	Won	
2010	Helena Bonham Carter	The King's Speech	Nominated	
2011	Janet McTeer	Albert Nobbs	Nominated	
2013	Sally Hawkins	Blue Jasmine	Nominated	
2014	Keira Knightley	The Imitation Game	Nominated	
2015	Kate Winslet	Steve Jobs	Nominated	
2016	Naomie Harris	Moonlight	Nominated	
2017	Lesley Manville	Phantom Thread	Nominated	
2018	Rachel Weisz	The Favourite	Nominated	
2019	Florence Pugh	Little Women	Nominated	
2020	Olivia Colman	The Father	Nominated	
2021	Judi Dench	Belfast	Nominated	
2023	Emily Blunt	Oppenheimer	Nominated	
2024	Felicity Jones	The Brutalist	Nominated	
2025	Wunmi Mosaku	Sinners	Nominated	Mosaku is a Nigerian born British actress.

== Best Casting ==
Year	Name	Film	Status	Notes
2025	Nina Gold	Hamnet	Nominated	

== Best Director ==
Year	Name	Film	Status	Notes
1928–29	Frank Lloyd	Drag	Nominated	No official nominees had been announced this year.
1928–29	Frank Lloyd	Weary River	Nominated	No official nominees had been announced this year.
1928–29	Frank Lloyd	The Divine Lady	Won	
1932–33	Frank Lloyd	Cavalcade	Won	Lloyd's father was Welsh and his mother was Scottish, and Lloyd was born in Glasgow, Scotland.
1935	Frank Lloyd	Mutiny on the Bounty	Nominated	
1940	Alfred Hitchcock	Rebecca	Nominated	
1944	Alfred Hitchcock	Lifeboat	Nominated	
1945	Alfred Hitchcock	Spellbound	Nominated	
1945	David Lean	Brief Encounter	Nominated	
1947	David Lean	Great Expectations	Nominated	
1948	Laurence Olivier	Hamlet	Nominated	
1949	Carol Reed	The Fallen Idol	Nominated	
1950	Carol Reed	The Third Man	Nominated	
1954	Alfred Hitchcock	Rear Window	Nominated	
1955	David Lean	Summertime	Nominated	
1956	Michael Anderson	Around the World in 80 Days	Nominated	
1957	David Lean	The Bridge on the River Kwai	Won	
1959	Jack Clayton	Room at the Top	Nominated	
1960	Jack Cardiff	Sons and Lovers	Nominated	
1960	Alfred Hitchcock	Psycho	Nominated	
1961	J. Lee Thompson	The Guns of Navarone	Nominated	
1962	David Lean	Lawrence of Arabia	Won	
1963	Tony Richardson	Tom Jones	Won	
1964	Robert Stevenson	Mary Poppins	Nominated	
1964	Peter Glenville	Becket	Nominated	
1965	John Schlesinger	Darling	Nominated	
1965	David Lean	Doctor Zhivago	Nominated	
1968	Carol Reed	Oliver!	Won	
1968	Anthony Harvey	The Lion in Winter	Nominated	
1969	John Schlesinger	Midnight Cowboy	Won	
1970	Ken Russell	Women In Love	Nominated	
1971	John Schlesinger	Sunday Bloody Sunday	Nominated	
1972	John Boorman	Deliverance	Nominated	
1978	Alan Parker	Midnight Express	Nominated	
1979	Peter Yates	Breaking Away	Nominated	
1981	Hugh Hudson	Chariots of Fire	Nominated	
1982	Richard Attenborough	Gandhi	Won	
1983	Peter Yates	The Dresser	Nominated	
1984	David Lean	A Passage to India	Nominated	
1984	Roland Joffé	The Killing Fields	Nominated	
1986	Roland Joffé	The Mission	Nominated	
1987	John Boorman	Hope and Glory	Nominated	
1987	Adrian Lyne	Fatal Attraction	Nominated	
1988	Charles Crichton	A Fish Called Wanda	Nominated	
1988	Alan Parker	Mississippi Burning	Nominated	
1989	Kenneth Branagh	Henry V	Nominated	Film directorial debut.
1990	Stephen Frears	The Grifters	Nominated	
1991	Ridley Scott	Thelma & Louise	Nominated	
1995	Mike Figgis	Leaving Las Vegas	Nominated	
1995	Michael Radford	The Postman	Nominated	(original title: Il postino). Radford is an English director born in India.
1996	Mike Leigh	Secrets & Lies	Nominated	
1996	Anthony Minghella	The English Patient	Won	
1997	Peter Cattaneo	The Full Monty	Nominated	
1998	John Madden	Shakespeare in Love	Nominated	
1999	Sam Mendes	American Beauty	Won	Film directorial debut. Mendes is the first British director and the sixth director overall, to win an Academy Award for Best Director for a debut film.
2000	Stephen Daldry	Billy Elliot	Nominated	
2000	Ridley Scott	Gladiator	Nominated	
2001	Ridley Scott	Black Hawk Down	Nominated	
2002	Stephen Daldry	The Hours	Nominated	
2004	Mike Leigh	Vera Drake	Nominated	
2006	Stephen Frears	The Queen	Nominated	
2006	Paul Greengrass	United 93	Nominated	
2008	Danny Boyle	Slumdog Millionaire	Won	
2008	Stephen Daldry	The Reader	Nominated	
2010	Tom Hooper	The King's Speech	Won	
2013	Steve McQueen	12 Years a Slave	Nominated	First black English director to be nominated for Best Director.
2017	Christopher Nolan	Dunkirk	Nominated	
2019	Sam Mendes	1917	Nominated	
2020	Emerald Fennell	Promising Young Woman	Nominated	First English woman to be nominated for Best Director.
2021	Kenneth Branagh	Belfast	Nominated	
2022	Martin McDonagh	The Banshees of Inisherin	Nominated	McDonagh is a British-born Irish person.
2023	Christopher Nolan	Oppenheimer	Won	
2023	Jonathan Glazer	The Zone of Interest	Nominated	

== Best Assistant Director (1933 to 1937) ==
Year	Name	Film	Status	Notes
1933	Fred Fox	—N/a	Won	For United Artists.
1935	Eric G. Stacey	Les Misérables	Nominated	
1936	Eric G. Stacey	The Garden of Allah	Nominated	
1937	Eric G. Stacey	A Star Is Born	Nominated	

== Best Writing – Adapted Screenplay ==
Year	Name	Film	Status	Notes
1933	Victor Heerman	Little Women	Won	Shared with Sarah Y. Mason.
1938	Ian Dalrymple; Cecil Arthur Lewis; W. P. Lipscomb	Pygmalion	Won	Shared with George Bernard Shaw.
1938	Ian Dalrymple	The Citadel	Nominated	Shared with Frank Wead and Elizabeth Hill.
1939	R. C. Sherriff; Claudine West; Eric Maschwitz	Goodbye, Mr. Chips	Nominated	
1940	Joan Harrison	Rebecca	Nominated	Shared with Robert E. Sherwood.
1942	James Hilton; Claudine West; Arthur Wimperis	Mrs. Miniver	Won	Shared with George Froeschel.
1942	Claudine West; Arthur Wimperis	Random Harvest	Nominated	Shared with George Froeschel.
1942	Rodney Ackland; Emeric Pressburger	49th Parallel	Nominated	Pressburger was a Hungarian-British screenwriter, film director, and producer.
1944	John Van Druten	Gaslight	Nominated	Shared with Walter Reisch and John L. Balderston.
1946	Raymond Chandler	Double Indemnity	Nominated	Chandler was a British-American novelist and screenwriter. Shared with Billy Wilder.
1946	Anthony Havelock-Allan; David Lean; Ronald Neame	Brief Encounter	Nominated	
1947	Anthony Havelock-Allan; David Lean; Ronald Neame	Great Expectations	Nominated	
1949	Graham Greene	The Fallen Idol	Nominated	
1952	John Dighton; Roger MacDougall; Alexander Mackendrick	The Man in the White Suit	Nominated	Mackendrick was a British-American.
1953	Ian McLellan Hunter; John Dighton	Roman Holiday	Nominated	
1953	Eric Ambler	The Cruel Sea	Nominated	
1956	Ivan Moffat	Giant	Nominated	Shared with Fred Guiol.
1958	Terence Rattigan	Separate Tables	Nominated	Shared with John Gay.
1958	Alec Guinness	The Horse's Mouth	Nominated	
1959	Neil Paterson	Room at the Top	Won	
1960	Gavin Lambert; T. E. B. Clarke	Sons and Lovers	Nominated	
1960	James Kennaway	Tunes of Glory	Nominated	
1962	Robert Bolt	Lawrence of Arabia	Nominated	Shared with Michael Wilson.
1963	John Osborne	Tom Jones	Won	
1964	Peter George	Dr. Strangelove or: How I Learned to Stop Worrying and Love the Bomb	Nominated	Shared with Stanley Kubrick and Terry Southern.
1965	Robert Bolt	Doctor Zhivago	Won	
1966	Robert Bolt	A Man for All Seasons	Won	
1966	Bill Naughton	Alfie	Nominated	
1968	Vernon Harris	Oliver!	Nominated	
1969	John Hale; Bridget Boland	Anne of the Thousand Days	Nominated	Shared with Richard Sokolove.
1974	Lionel Chetwynd	The Apprenticeship of Duddy Kravitz	Nominated	Chetwynd is an English-born Canadian–American screenwriter. Shared with Mordecai Richler.
1974	Paul Dehn	Murder on the Orient Express	Nominated	
1976	David Butler	Voyage of the Damned	Nominated	Shared with Steve Shagan.
1977	Peter Shaffer	Equus	Nominated	
1977	Gavin Lambert	I Never Promised You a Rose Garden	Nominated	Shared with Lewis John Carlino.
1981	Dennis Potter	Pennies from Heaven	Nominated	
1981	Harold Pinter	The French Lieutenant's Woman	Nominated	
1983	Harold Pinter	Betrayal	Nominated	
1983	Willy Russell	Educating Rita	Nominated	
1983	Ronald Harwood	The Dresser	Nominated	Harwood is South African-born British.
1984	Peter Shaffer	Amadeus	Won	
1984	David Lean	A Passage to India	Nominated	
1984	Bruce Robinson	The Killing Fields	Nominated	
1986	Ruth Prawer Jhabvala	A Room with a View	Won	Jhabvala is a German-born British novelist, short story writer, and screenwriter, with an Indian and American citizenship.
1987	Mark Peploe	The Last Emperor	Won	Shared with Bernardo Bertolucci.
1987	James Dearden	Fatal Attraction	Nominated	
1988	Christopher Hampton	Dangerous Liaisons	Won	
1992	Peter Barnes	Enchanted April	Nominated	
1992	Ruth Prawer Jhabvala	Howards End	Won	
1993	Ruth Prawer Jhabvala	The Remains of the Day	Nominated	
1993	William Nicholson	Shadowlands	Nominated	
1994	Alan Bennett	The Madness of King George	Nominated	
1995	Emma Thompson	Sense and Sensibility	Won	Thompson is the only person in Academy history to win an Academy Award for both acting (of which Thompson previously won Best Actress for Howards End) and writing categories (Best Adapted Screenplay).
1995	Mike Figgis	Leaving Las Vegas	Nominated	
1995	Michael Radford	Il Postino	Nominated	Shared with Anna Pavignano, Furio Scarpelli, Giacomo Scarpelli, and Massimo Troisi.
1996	Kenneth Branagh	Hamlet	Nominated	
1996	John Hodge	Trainspotting	Nominated	
1996	Anthony Minghella	The English Patient	Nominated	
1997	Hossein Amini	The Wings of the Dove	Nominated	Amini is an Iranian-born British screenwriter.
1999	Anthony Minghella	The Talented Mr Ripley	Nominated	
2002	David Hare	The Hours	Nominated	
2002	Ronald Harwood	The Pianist	Won	
2005	Jeffrey Caine	The Constant Gardener	Nominated	
2006	Patrick Marber	Notes on a Scandal	Nominated	
2006	Sacha Baron Cohen; Anthony Hines; Peter Baynham; Dan Mazer	Borat: Cultural Learnings of America for Make Benefit Glorious Nation of Kazakhstan	Nominated	Shared with Todd Phillips.
2007	Christopher Hampton	Atonement	Nominated	
2007	Ronald Harwood	The Diving Bell and the Butterfly	Nominated	
2008	Simon Beaufoy	Slumdog Millionaire	Won	
2008	Peter Morgan	Frost/Nixon	Nominated	
2008	David Hare	The Reader	Nominated	
2009	Nick Hornby	An Education	Nominated	
2009	Jesse Armstrong; Simon Blackwell; Tony Roche; Armando Iannucci	In the Loop	Nominated	
2010	Danny Boyle; Simon Beaufoy	127 Hours	Nominated	
2011	Bridget O'Connor; Peter Straughan	Tinker Tailor Soldier Spy	Nominated	
2013	Steve Coogan; Jeff Pope	Philomena	Nominated	
2015	Nick Hornby	Brooklyn	Nominated	
2020	Christopher Hampton	The Father	Won	Shared with Florian Zeller.
2020	Sacha Baron Cohen; Dan Swimer; Peter Baynham; Dan Mazer; Anthony Hines	Borat Subsequent Moviefilm	Nominated	Shared with Erica Rivinoja, Lee Kern, and Jena Friedman.
2022	Kazuo Ishiguro	Living	Nominated	
2022	Lesley Paterson; Ian Stokell	All Quiet on the Western Front	Nominated	Shared with Edward Berger
2023	Christopher Nolan	Oppenheimer	Nominated	
2023	Jonathan Glazer	The Zone of Interest	Nominated	
2024	Peter Straughan	Conclave	Won	
2025	Maggie O'Farrell	Hamnet	Nominated	O'Farrell was born in Northern Ireland and currently lives in Edinburgh, Scotland. Shared with Chloé Zhao.

== Best Writing – Original Screenplay ==
Year	Name	Film	Status	Notes
1940	Charlie Chaplin	The Great Dictator	Nominated	
1940	Charles Bennett; Joan Harrison	Foreign Correspondent	Nominated	
1942	Michael Powell; Emeric Pressburger	One of Our Aircraft Is Missing	Nominated	Pressburger was a Hungarian-British screenwriter, film director, and producer.
1943	Noël Coward	In Which We Serve	Nominated	
1946	Muriel Box; Sydney Box	The Seventh Veil	Won	
1946	Raymond Chandler	The Blue Dahlia	Nominated	
1947	Charlie Chaplin	Monsieur Verdoux	Nominated	
1949	T. E. B. Clarke	Passport to Pimlico	Nominated	
1949	Alfred Hayes	Paisan	Nominated	Shared with Federico Fellini, Sergio Amidei, Marcello Pagliero, and Roberto Rossellini.
1952	T. E. B. Clarke	The Lavender Hill Mob	Won	
1952	Terence Rattigan	The Sound Barrier	Nominated	
1960	Bryan Forbes; Richard Gregson; Michael Craig	The Angry Silence	Nominated	
1964	Alun Owen	A Hard Day's Night	Nominated	
1965	Frederic Raphael	Darling	Won	Raphael was born in the US in 1931 but emigrated to England in 1938.
1965	Jack Davies; Ken Annakin	Those Magnificent Men in their Flying Machines	Nominated	
1966	Edward Bond	Blowup	Nominated	Shared with Michelangelo Antonioni and Tonino Guerra.
1967	Frederic Raphael	Two for the Road	Nominated	
1968	Peter Ustinov	Hot Millions	Nominated	Shared with Ira Wallach.
1968	Arthur C. Clarke	2001: A Space Odyssey	Nominated	Shared with Stanley Kubrick.
1971	Penelope Gilliatt	Sunday Bloody Sunday	Nominated	
1981	Colin Welland	Chariots of Fire	Won	
1981	Trevor Griffiths	Reds	Nominated	Shared with Warren Beatty.
1985	Terry Gilliam; Charles McKeown; Tom Stoppard	Brazil	Nominated	Gilliam was born in the US in 1940 but emigrated to England in 1968.
1985	Hanif Kureishi	My Beautiful Laundrette	Nominated	Kureishi is a British playwright, screenwriter, and filmmaker of Pakistani descent.
1988	John Cleese; Charles Crichton	A Fish Called Wanda	Nominated	
1994	Richard Curtis	Four Weddings and a Funeral	Nominated	
1996	Mike Leigh	Secrets & Lies	Nominated	
1997	Simon Beaufoy	The Full Monty	Nominated	
1998	Tom Stoppard	Shakespeare In Love	Won	Stoppard is a Czech-born English writer. Shared with Marc Norman.
1999	Mike Leigh	Topsy-Turvy	Nominated	
2000	Lee Hall	Billy Elliot	Nominated	
2000	William Nicholson	Gladiator	Nominated	Shared with David Franzoni and John Logan.
2001	Julian Fellowes	Gosford Park	Won	
2001	Christopher Nolan; Jonathan Nolan	Memento	Nominated	
2003	Steven Knight	Dirty Pretty Things	Nominated	
2004	Mike Leigh	Vera Drake	Nominated	
2006	Peter Morgan	The Queen	Nominated	
2007	Jan Pinkava	Ratatouille	Nominated	Pinkava was born in Prague and emigrated to Britain, where he obtained British citizenship. Shared with Brad Bird and Jim Capobianco.
2008	Martin McDonagh	In Bruges	Nominated	McDonagh is a British-born Irish person.
2008	Mike Leigh	Happy-Go-Lucky	Nominated	
2010	Mike Leigh	Another Year	Nominated	
2010	Christopher Nolan	Inception	Nominated	
2010	David Seidler	The King's Speech	Won	Seidler is a British-American playwright and film writer.
2014	Hugo Guinness	The Grand Budapest Hotel	Nominated	Shared with Wes Anderson.
2015	Matt Charman	Bridge of Spies	Nominated	Shared with Joel and Ethan Coen.
2015	Alex Garland	Ex Machina	Nominated	
2017	Martin McDonagh	Three Billboards Outside Ebbing, Missouri	Nominated	
2019	Sam Mendes; Krysty Wilson-Cairns	1917	Nominated	
2020	Emerald Fennell	Promising Young Woman	Won	
2021	Kenneth Branagh	Belfast	Won	
2022	Martin McDonagh	The Banshees of Inisherin	Nominated	

== Best Writing – Story (1928 to 1956) ==
Year	Name	Film	Status	Notes
1942	Emeric Pressburger	49th Parallel	Won	
1943	Gordon McDonell	Shadow of a Doubt	Nominated	McDonell is a British-born American writer.
1945	Charles G. Booth	The House on 92nd Street	Won	
1946	Clemence Dane	Perfect Strangers	Won	
1948	Emeric Pressburger	The Red Shoes	Nominated	
1951	Alfred Hayes	Teresa	Nominated	Shared with Stewart Stern.
1951	Oscar Millard	The Frogmen	Nominated	
1951	James Bernard; Paul Dehn	Seven Days to Noon	Won	

== Best Picture ==
Year	Name	Film	Status	Notes
1932/33	Alexander Korda	The Private Life of Henry VIII	Nominated	Korda was a Hungarian-born British film producer, director, and screenwriter.
1938	Victor Saville	The Citadel	Nominated	
1939	Victor Saville	Goodbye, Mr. Chips	Nominated	
1940	Charlie Chaplin	The Great Dictator	Nominated	
1941	Alfred Hitchcock	Suspicion	Nominated	
1942	Michael Powell	49th Parallel	Nominated	
1943	Noël Coward	In Which We Serve	Nominated	
1946	Laurence Olivier	Henry V	Nominated	
1947	Anthony Havelock-Allan; Ronald Neame	Great Expectations	Nominated	
1948	Laurence Olivier	Hamlet	Won	
1948	Michael Powell; Emeric Pressburger	The Red Shoes	Nominated	Pressburger was a Hungarian-British screenwriter, film director, and producer.
1953	John Houseman	Julius Caesar	Nominated	Houseman was a Romanian-born British-American actor and producer.
1959	James Woolf; John Woolf	Room at the Top	Nominated	
1963	Tony Richardson	Tom Jones	Won	
1965	Joseph Janni	Darling	Nominated	
1966	Lewis Gilbert	Alfie	Nominated	
1968	John Woolf	Oliver!	Won	
1968	Anthony Havelock-Allan; John Brabourne	Romeo and Juliet	Nominated	
1972	John Boorman	Deliverance	Nominated	
1978	Barry Spikings; Michael Deeley	The Deer Hunter	Won	Shared with Michael Cimino and John Peverall.
1978	David Puttnam; Alan Marshall	Midnight Express	Nominated	
1979	Peter Yates	Breaking Away	Nominated	
1980	Timothy Burrill	Tess	Nominated	Shared with Claude Berri.
1981	David Puttnam	Chariots of Fire	Won	
1982	Richard Attenborough	Gandhi	Won	
1983	Peter Yates	The Dresser	Nominated	
1984	David Puttnam	The Killing Fields	Nominated	
1984	John Brabourne; Richard Goodwin	A Passage to India	Nominated	
1986	David Puttnam	The Mission	Nominated	
1987	Jeremy Thomas	The Last Emperor	Won	The Last Emperor is an English-produced, mostly Italian-made film shot in China.
1987	John Boorman	Hope and Glory	Nominated	
1988	Norma Heyman	Dangerous Liaisons	Nominated	Shared with Hank Moonjean.
1992	Stephen Woolley	The Crying Game	Nominated	
1994	Duncan Kenworthy	Four Weddings and a Funeral	Nominated	
1996	Jane Scott	Shine	Nominated	Scott is a British-born Australian film producer.
1996	Simon Channing-Williams	Secrets and Lies	Nominated	
1998	David Parfitt	Shakespeare in Love	Won	Shared with Harvey Weinstein, Edward Zwick, Marc Norman, and Donna Gigliotti.
1998	Alison Owen; Tim Bevan; Eric Fellner	Elizabeth	Nominated	Bevan is a New Zealand-born English producer.
1998	Ian Bryce	Saving Private Ryan	Nominated	Shared with Steven Spielberg, Mark Gordon, and Gary Levinsohn.
2002	Robert Fox	The Hours	Nominated	Shared with Scott Rudin.
2004	Graham King	The Aviator	Nominated	King is a Los Angeles-based English producer. Shared with Michael Mann.
2006	Andy Harries; Tracey Seaward; Christine Langan	The Queen	Nominated	
2006	Graham King	The Departed	Won	
2007	JoAnne Sellar; Daniel Lupi	There Will Be Blood	Nominated	Shared with Paul Thomas Anderson.
2007	Tim Bevan; Eric Fellner; Paul Webster	Atonement	Nominated	
2008	Eric Fellner	Frost/Nixon	Nominated	Shared with Ron Howard and Brian Grazer.
2008	Christian Colson	Slumdog Millionaire	Won	
2008	Anthony Minghella	The Reader	Nominated	Shared with Sydney Pollack, Donna Gigliotti, and Redmond Morris.
2009	Amanda Posey	An Education	Nominated	Shared with Finola Dwyer.
2010	Celine Rattray	The Kids Are All Right	Nominated	Shared with Gary Gilbert and Jeffrey Levy-Hinte.
2010	Christian Colson; John Smithson; Danny Boyle	127 Hours	Nominated	
2010	Christopher Nolan; Emma Thomas	Inception	Nominated	
2010	Gareth Unwin; Iain Canning	The King's Speech	Won	Shared with Emile Sherman.
2011	Graham King	Hugo	Nominated	Shared with Martin Scorsese.
2012	Tim Bevan; Eric Fellner; Debra Hayward; Cameron Mackintosh	Les Misérables	Nominated	Mackintosh previously won Tony Award for Best Musical for the musical of the same name.
2013	Steve McQueen	12 Years a Slave	Won	McQueen is the first black British director and producer, as well as the first black director and producer overall, to win Best Picture. Shared with Brad Pitt, Dede Gardner, Jeremy Kleiner, and Anthony Katagas.
2013	David Heyman	Gravity	Nominated	Shared with Alfonso Cuarón.
2013	Gabrielle Tana; Steve Coogan; Tracey Seaward	Philomena	Nominated	
2014	Christian Colson	Selma	Nominated	Shared with Dede Gardner, Jeremy Kleiner, and Oprah Winfrey.
2014	Tim Bevan; Eric Fellner	The Theory of Everything	Nominated	Shared with Lisa Bruce and Anthony McCarten.
2015	Simon Kinberg; Ridley Scott; Mark Huffam	The Martian	Nominated	Shared with Michael Schaefer.
2015	Amanda Posey	Brooklyn	Nominated	Shared with Finola Dwyer.
2016	Iain Canning	Lion	Nominated	Shared with Emile Sherman and Angie Fielder.
2017	Tim Bevan; Eric Fellner	Darkest Hour	Nominated	Shared with Lisa Bruce, Anthony McCarten, and Douglas Urbanski.
2017	Emma Thomas; Christopher Nolan	Dunkirk	Nominated	
2017	JoAnne Sellar; Daniel Lupi	Phantom Thread	Nominated	Shared with Paul Thomas Anderson and Megan Ellison.
2017	Graham Broadbent; Pete Czernin; Martin McDonagh	Three Billboards Outside Ebbing, Missouri	Nominated	McDonagh is Irish-British playwright, screenwriter, producer, and film director, born in London to Irish parents.
2018	Graham King	Bohemian Rhapsody	Nominated	
2019	David Heyman	Marriage Story	Nominated	Shared with Noah Baumbach.
2019	David Heyman	Once Upon a Time in Hollywood	Nominated	Shared with Shannon McIntosh and Quentin Tarantino.
2019	Sam Mendes; Pippa Harris	1917	Nominated	Shared with Jayne-Ann Tenggren and Callum McDougall.
2020	David Parfitt	The Father	Nominated	Shared with Jean-Louis Livi and Philippe Carcassonne.
2020	Emerald Fennel	Promising Young Woman	Nominated	Shared with Ben Browning, Ashley Fox, and Josey McNamara.
2021	Adam Somner	Licorice Pizza	Nominated	Shared with Sara Murphy and Paul Thomas Anderson.
2021	Kenneth Branagh	Belfast	Nominated	Shared with Laura Berwick, Becca Kovacik and Tamar Thomas.
2021	Iain Canning; Tanya Seghatchian	The Power of the Dog	Nominated	Shared with Jane Campion, Emile Sherman, and Roger Frappier.
2022	Graham Broadbent; Pete Czernin; Martin McDonagh	The Banshees of Inisherin	Nominated	
2023	David Heyman; Tom Ackerley	Barbie	Nominated	Shared with Margot Robbie and Robbie Brenner.
2023	Daniel Lupi	Killers of the Flower Moon	Nominated	Shared with Dan Friedkin, Bradley Thomas, and Martin Scorsese.
2023	Emma Thomas; Christopher Nolan	Oppenheimer	Won	Thomas is the first British woman to win Best Picture. Thomas and Nolan are the first British husband-and-wife team, as well as the third married couple overall, to win Best Picture. Shared with Charles Roven.
2023	James Wilson	The Zone of Interest	Nominated	
2024	Tessa Ross; Juliette Howell	Conclave	Nominated	Shared with Michael A. Jackman
2024	Tim Bevan; Eric Fellner	The Substance	Nominated	Shared with Coralie Fargeat
2025	Sam Mendes; Pippa Harris	Hamnet	Nominated	Shared with Liza Marshall, Nicolas Gonda, and Steven Spielberg
2025	Adam Somner	One Battle After Another	Won	Posthumous nomination Shared with Sara Murphy and Paul Thomas Anderson

== Best International Feature Film ==
Year	Name	Film	Status	Languages
1993	Paul Turner	Hedd Wyn	Nominated	Welsh. (some parts in English.)
1999	Paul Morrison	Solomon and Gaenor	Nominated	Welsh. (some parts in Yiddish.)
2023	Jonathan Glazer	The Zone of Interest	Won	German. (some parts in Polish and Yiddish.)

== Best Documentary Feature ==
Year	Name	Film	Status	Notes
1942	British Ministry of Information			
1942	British Ministry of Information	Listen to Britain	Nominated	Short subject and feature documentaries competed in a combined Best Documentary category.
1942	British Ministry of Information	Twenty-One Miles	Nominated	Short subject and feature documentaries competed in a combined Best Documentary category.
1942	Concanen Films	The White Eagle	Nominated	Short subject and feature documentaries competed in a combined Best Documentary category.
1943	British Ministry of Information	Desert Victory	Won	Winner of Best Documentary Feature.
1945	Government of Great Britain	The True Glory	Won	Winner of Best Documentary Feature.
1947	Paul Rotha	The World Is Rich	Nominated	Nominated for Best Documentary Feature.
1949	Crown Film Unit	Daybreak in Udi	Won	Winner of Best Documentary Feature.
1953	Castleton Knight	A Queen Is Crowned	Nominated	Nominated for Best Documentary Feature.
1958	James Carr	Antarctic Crossing	Nominated	Nominated for Best Documentary Feature.
1964	Peter Baylis	The Finest Hours	Nominated	Nominated for Best Documentary Feature.
1965	Peter Mills	The Forth Road Bridge	Nominated	Nominated for Best Documentary Feature.
1966	Peter Watkins	The War Game	Won	Winner of Best Documentary Feature.
1985	Japhet Asher	Soldiers in Hiding	Nominated	Nominated for Best Documentary Feature.
1987	Robert Stone	Radio Bikini	Nominated	Nominated for Best Documentary Feature.
1987	Michael Camerini	Hellfire: A Journey from Hiroshima	Nominated	Nominated for Best Documentary Feature. Shared with John Junkerman and James MacDonald.
1995	Jon Blair	Anne Frank Remembered	Won	Winner of Best Documentary Feature.
1999	Kevin Macdonald	One Day in September	Won	Winner of Best Documentary Feature. Shared with Arthur Cohn.
2002	Sean Welch	Spellbound	Nominated	Nominated for Best Documentary Feature. Shared with Jeffrey Blitz.
2002	Malcolm Clarke	Prisoner of Paradise	Nominated	Nominated for Best Documentary Feature. Shared with Stuart Sender.
2004	Zana Briski; Ross Kauffman	Born into Brothels	Won	Winner of Best Documentary Feature.
2008	James Marsh; Simon Chinn	Man on Wire	Won	Winner of Best Documentary Feature.
2010	Banksy; Jaimie D'Cruz	Exit Through the Gift Shop	Nominated	Nominated for Best Documentary Feature.
2010	Lucy Walker	Waste Land	Nominated	Nominated for Best Documentary Feature. Shared with Angus Aynsley.
2010	Tim Hetherington	Restrepo	Nominated	Nominated for Best Documentary Feature. Shared with Sebastian Junger.
2012	Joshua Oppenheimer	The Act of Killing	Nominated	Oppenheimer was an American film director, with a British citizenship. Nominated for Best Documentary Feature. Shared with Signe Byrge Sørensen.
2012	Simon Chinn	Searching for Sugar Man	Won	Winner of Best Documentary Feature. Shared with Malik Bendjelloul.
2014	Orlando von Einsiedel; Joanna Natasegara	Virunga	Nominated	Nominated for Best Documentary Feature.
2014	Joshua Oppenheimer	The Look of Silence	Nominated	Nominated for Best Documentary Feature. Shared with Signe Byrge Sørensen.
2015	Asif Kapadia; James Gay-Rees	Amy	Won	Winner of Best Documentary Feature.
2015	Justin Wilkes	What Happened, Miss Simone?	Nominated	Nominated for Best Documentary Feature. Shared with Liz Garbus and Amy Hobby.
2019	Joanna Natasegara	The Edge of Democracy	Nominated	Nominated for Best Documentary Feature. Shared with Petra Costa, Shane Boris, and Tiago Pavan.
2019	Edward Watts	For Sama	Nominated	Nominated for Best Documentary Feature. Shared with Waad Al-Kateab.
2022	Teddy Leifer	All That Breathes	Nominated	Nominated for Best Documentary Feature. Shared with Shaunak Sen and Aman Mann.
2023	John Battsek	Bobi Wine: The People's President	Nominated	Nominated for Best Documentary Feature. Shared with Moses Bwayo and Christopher Sharp.
2024	Ema Ryan Yamazaki	Instruments of a Beating Heart	Nominated	Born in Japan to a British father Shared with Eric Nyari

== Best Documentary – Short Subject ==
Year	Name	Film	Status	Notes
1941	British Ministry of Information	Christmas Under Fire	Nominated	
1941	British Ministry of Information	A Letter from Home	Nominated	
1952	Norman McLaren	Neighbours	Won	McLaren was a Scottish-born British/Canadian animator, director, and producer.
1953	James Carr	They Planted a Stone	Nominated	
1954	World Wide Pictures; Morse Films	Thursday's Children	Won	
1958	Thorold Dickinson	Oeuverture	Nominated	
1960	James Hill	Giuseppina	Won	
1963	Edgar Anstey	Thirty Million Letters	Nominated	
1965	Patrick Carey; Joe Mendoza	Yeats Country	Nominated	
1970	Patrick Carey; Vivien Carey	Oisin	Nominated	
1972	Humphrey Swingler	The Tide of Traffic	Nominated	
1974	Pen Densham	Life Times Nine	Nominated	Densham is British-Canadian. Shared with John Watson.
1974	Robin Lehman	Don't	Won	Densham is British-Canadian. Shared with John Watson.
1975	Robin Lehman	The End of the Game	Won	
1979	Phillip Borsos	Nails	Nominated	
1980	Pen Densham	Don't Mess with Bill	Nominated	
1981	Nigel Noble	Close Harmony	Won	
1988	Malcolm Clarke	You Don't Have to Die	Won	Shared with Bill Guttentag.
2011	Lucy Walker	The Tsunami and the Cherry Blossom	Nominated	Shared with Kira Carstensen.
2013	Malcolm Clarke; Nicholas Reed	The Lady in Number 6: Music Saved My Life	Won	Winner of Best Documentary – Short Subject.
2013	Sara Ishaq	Karama Has No Walls	Nominated	Ishaq is a Yemeni-Scottish filmmaker. Nominated for Best Documentary – Short Subject.
2015	Adam Benzine	Claude Lanzmann: Spectres of the Shoah	Nominated	
2016	Orlando von Einsiedel; Joanna Natasegara	The White Helmets	Won	Winner for Best Documentary – Short Subject.
2016	Stephen Ellis	Watani: My Homeland	Nominated	Nominated for Best Documentary – Short Subject. Shared with Marcel Mettelsiefen.

== Best Animated Feature ==
Year	Name	Film	Status	Notes
2005	Steve Box; Nick Park	Wallace & Gromit: The Curse of the Were-Rabbit	Won	
2006	Gil Kenan	Monster House	Nominated	Kenan is an Israeli-British-American director.
2008	John Stevenson	Kung Fu Panda	Nominated	Shared with Mark Osborne.
2012	Sam Fell; Chris Butler	ParaNorman	Nominated	
2012	Peter Lord	The Pirates! Band of Misfits	Nominated	
2015	Mark Burton; Richard Starzak	Shaun the Sheep Movie	Nominated	
2017	Hugh Welchman; Ivan Mactaggart	Loving Vincent	Nominated	Shared with Dorota Kobiela.
2019	Chris Butler	Missing Link	Nominated	Shared with Arianne Sutner and Travis Knight.
2020	Richard Phelan; Will Becher; Paul Kewley	A Shaun the Sheep Movie: Farmageddon	Nominated	
2024	Nick Park; Merlin Crossingham; Richard Beek	Wallace & Gromit: Vengeance Most Fowl	Nominated	

== Best Animated Short Film ==
Year	Name	Film	Status	Notes
1963	Gerald Potterton	My Financial Career	Nominated	Potterton is a British–Canadian.
1964	Norman McLaren; Gerald Potterton; Jeff Hale	Christmas Cracker	Nominated	McLaren was a Scottish-born British/Canadian animator, director and producer. Shared with Grant Munro.
1971	Gerald Potterton	The Selfish Giant	Nominated	Shared with Peter Sander.
1971	Michael Mills	Evolution	Nominated	Michael Mills is a British-born Canadian.
1972	Bob Godfrey	Kama Sutra Rides Again	Nominated	
1972	Richard Williams	A Christmas Carol	Won	Williams is a Canadian–British animator, voice artist, and writer.
1974	Peter Foldes	Hunger	Nominated	Shared with René Jodoin.
1975	Bob Godfrey	Great	Won	
1978	Eunice Macaulay	Special Delivery	Won	Shared with John Weldon.
1979	Bob Godfrey	Dream Doll	Nominated	Shared with Zlatko Grgic.
1979	Derek Lamb	Every Child	Won	
1982	Dianne Jackson	The Snowman	Nominated	
1984	Jon Minnis	Charade	Won	Minnis is a Canadian animator and scriptwriter of British origin.
1985	Alison Snowden	Second Class Mail	Nominated	
1987	Eunice Macaulay	George and Rosemary	Nominated	
1989	Mark Baker	The Hill Farm	Nominated	
1990	Nick Park	Creature Comforts	Won	
1990	Nick Park	A Grand Day Out	Nominated	
1991	Daniel Greaves	Manipulation	Won	
1992	Paul Berry	The Sandman	Nominated	
1992	Peter Lord	Adam	Nominated	
1992	Barry Purves	Screen Play	Nominated	
1993	Bob Godfrey	Small Talk	Nominated	Shared with Kevin Baldwin.
1993	Nick Park	The Wrong Trousers	Won	
1993	Mark Baker	The Village	Nominated	
1994	Alison Snowden	Bob's Birthday	Won	Shared with David Fine.
1994	Tim Watts; David Stoten	The Big Story	Nominated	
1995	Nick Park	A Close Shave	Won	
1996	Peter Lord	Wat's Pig	Nominated	
1997	Joanna Quinn	Famous Fred	Nominated	
1997	Jan Pinkava	Geri's Game	Won	Pinkava is Czech and holds dual British and American citizenship.
1998	Mark Baker	Jolly Roger	Nominated	
1999	Peter Peake	Humdrum	Nominated	
2005	Sharon Colman	Badgered	Nominated	
2007	Suzie Templeton; Hugh Welchman	Peter and the Wolf	Won	
2008	Adam Foulkes; Alan Smith	This Way Up	Nominated	
2009	Nick Park	A Matter of Loaf and Death	Nominated	
2011	Grant Orchard; Sue Goffe	A Morning Stroll	Nominated	
2014	Daisy Jacobs	The Bigger Picture	Nominated	
2015	Richard Williams; Imogen Sutton	Prologue	Nominated	Both Williams and Sutton are Canadian–British.
2015	Sanjay Patel	Sanjay's Super Team	Nominated	Patel is a British-American. Shared with Nicole Paradis Grindle.
2016	Cara Speller	Pear Cider and Cigarettes	Nominated	Shared with Robert Valley.
2018	Alison Snowden	Animal Behaviour	Nominated	Shared with David Fine.
2021	Joanna Quinn	Affairs of the Art	Nominated	Shared with Les Mills.
2021	Mikey Please	Robin Robin	Nominated	Shared with Dan Ojari.

== Best Production Design ==
Year	Name	Film	Status	Notes
1927/28	William Cameron Menzies	The Dove; Tempest	Won	
1928/29	William Cameron Menzies	Alibi	Nominated	
1928/29	William Cameron Menzies	The Awakening	Nominated	
1929/30	William Cameron Menzies	Bulldog Drummond	Nominated	
1931/32	Lazare Meerson	À Nous la Liberté	Nominated	Meerson is a Russian-born French and English film art director.
1937	David S. Hall	Wee Willie Winkie	Nominated	Shared with William S. Darling.
1938	Charles D. Hall	Merrily We Live	Nominated	Hall is a British-American art director and production designer.
1939	Charles D. Hall	Captain Fury	Nominated	
1939	James Basevi	Wuthering Heights	Nominated	
1940	James Basevi	The Westerner	Nominated	
1940	Vincent Korda	The Thief of Bagdad	Won	Korda is a Hungarian-born art director, later settling in Britain.
1941	Vincent Korda	That Hamilton Woman	Nominated	Shared with Julia Heron.
1942	Vincent Korda	Jungle Book	Nominated	Shared with Julia Heron.
1943	James Basevi	The Gang's All Here	Nominated	Shared with Joseph C. Wright and Thomas Little.
1943	James Basevi	The Song of Bernadette	Won	Shared with William S. Darling and Thomas Little.
1945	Hans Peters	The Picture of Dorian Gray	Nominated	Shared with Cedric Gibbons, Edwin B. Willis, John Bonar, and Hugh Hunt.
1946	John Bryan	Caesar and Cleopatra	Nominated	
1946	Paul Sheriff; Carmen Dillon	Henry V	Nominated	Sheriff is a Russian-born British art director.
1947	Wilfred Shingleton; John Bryan	Great Expectations	Won	
1948	Arthur Lawson	The Red Shoes	Won	Best Colour Art Direction award. Shared with Hein Heckroth.
1948	Roger K. Furse; Carmen Dillon	Hamlet	Won	Best Black and White Art Direction.
1949	Jim Morahan; William Kellner; Michael Relph	Saraband for Dead Lovers	Nominated	Kellner is an Austrian-born English.
1950	Hans Peters	The Red Danube	Nominated	Shared with Cedric Gibbons, Edwin B. Willis, and Hugh Hunt.
1952	Paul Sheriff	Moulin Rouge	Won	Shared with Marcel Vertès.
1953	Hans Peters; John Jarvis	Knights of the Round Table	Nominated	Shared with Alfred Junge.
1956	Ken Adam	Around the World in 80 Days	Nominated	Shared with James W. Sullivan and Ross J. Dowd.
1956	Hans Peters	Lust for Life	Nominated	Shared with Cedric Gibbons, E. Preston Ames, Edwin B. Willis, and F. Keogh Gleason.
1959	Oliver Messel; William Kellner; Scott Slimon	Suddenly, Last Summer	Nominated	
1960	Thomas N. Morahan; Lionel Couch	Sons and Lovers	Nominated	
1962	Vincent Korda	The Longest Day	Nominated	Shared with Ted Haworth, Léon Barsacq, and Gabriel Béchir.
1962	John Box; John Stoll	Lawrence of Arabia	Won	Shared with Dario Simoni.
1963	Elven Webb; Maurice Pelling	Cleopatra	Won	Shared with John DeCuir, Jack Martin Smith, Hilyard M. Brown, Herman A. Blumenthal, Boris Juraga, Walter M. Scott, Paul S. Fox, and Ray Moyer.
1963	Ralph Brinton; Ted Marshall; Jocelyn Herbert	Tom Jones	Nominated	Shared with Josie MacAvin.
1964	Stephen Grimes	The Night of the Iguana	Nominated	
1964	Cecil Beaton	My Fair Lady	Won	Shared with Gene Allen and George James Hopkins.
1964	John Bryan; Maurice Carter	Becket	Nominated	Shared with Patrick McLoughlin and Robert Cartwright.
1964	Hans Peters; Elliot Scott	The Americanization of Emily	Nominated	Shared with George Davis, Henry Grace, and Robert R. Benton.
1965	Ted Marshall	The Spy Who Came in from the Cold	Nominated	Shared with Hal Pereira, Tambi Larsen, and Josie MacAvin.
1965	David S. Hall	The Greatest Story Ever Told	Nominated	Shared with Richard Day, William Creber, Ray Moyer, Fred M. Maclean, and Norman Rockett.
1965	John Box; Terence Marsh	Doctor Zhivago	Won	Shared with Dario Simoni.
1966	John Sturtevant	The Sand Pebbles	Nominated	Shared with Boris Leven, Walter M. Scott, and William Kiernan.
1967	Elven Webb	The Taming of the Shrew	Nominated	Shared with Lorenzo Mongiardino, John DeCuir, Giuseppe Mariani, Dario Simoni, and Luigi Gervasi.
1968	John Box; Terence Marsh; Vernon Dixon; Ken Muggleston	Oliver!	Won	
1968	Ernest Archer; Anthony Masters; Harry Lange	2001: A Space Odyssey	Nominated	Lange is a German-born British.
1969	Maurice Carter; Lionel Couch	Anne of the Thousand Days	Nominated	Shared with Patrick McLoughlin.
1970	Terence Marsh; Pamela Cornell	Scrooge	Nominated	Nominated with Bob Cartwright.
1971	Terence Marsh; Peter Howitt	Mary, Queen of Scots	Nominated	Shared with Robert Cartwright.
1971	Peter Ellenshaw	Bedknobs and Broomsticks	Nominated	Shared with John B. Mansbridge, Emile Kuri, and Hal Gausman.
1971	John Box; Ernest Archer; Jack Maxsted; Vernon Dixon	Nicholas and Alexandra	Won	Shared with Gil Parrondo.
1971	Michael Stringer; Peter Lamont	Fiddler on the Roof	Nominated	Shared with Robert F. Boyle.
1972	Donald M. Ashton; Geoffrey Drake; William Hutchinson; John Graysmark; Peter James	Young Winston	Nominated	
1972	John Box; Robert W. Laing	Travels with My Aunt	Nominated	Shared with Gil Parrondo.
1973	Stephen Grimes	The Way We Were	Nominated	Shared with William Kiernan.
1974	Peter Ellenshaw	The Island at the Top of the World	Nominated	Shared with John B. Mansbridge, Walter Tyler, Al Roelofs, and Hal Gausman.
1975	Ken Adam; Roy Walker; Vernon Dixon	Barry Lyndon	Won	
1975	Tony Inglis; Peter James	The Man Who Would Be King	Nominated	Inglis is a British-Irish art director. Shared with Alexander Trauner.
1976	Elliot Scott; Norman Reynolds	The Incredible Sarah	Nominated	
1977	John Barry; Norman Reynolds; Roger Christian; Leslie Dilley	Star Wars	Won	
1977	Ken Adam; Peter Lamont; Hugh Scaife	The Spy Who Loved Me	Nominated	
1978	Tony Walton	The Wiz	Nominated	Shared with Philip Rosenberg, Edward Stewart and Robert Drumheller.
1979	Tony Walton	All That Jazz	Won	Shared with Philip Rosenberg, Edward Stewart and Gary Brink.
1979	Michael Seymour; Leslie Dilley; Roger Christian; Ian Whittaker	Alien	Nominated	
1980	Norman Reynolds; Leslie Dilley; Harry Lange; Alan Tomkins; Michael D. Ford	Star Wars Episode V: The Empire Strikes Back	Nominated	
1980	Stuart Craig; Hugh Scaife	The Elephant Man	Nominated	Shared with Robert Cartwright.
1980	Jack Stephens	Tess	Won	Shared with Pierre Guffroy.
1981	John Graysmark; Tony Reading; Peter Howitt	Ragtime	Nominated	Shared with Patrizia von Brandenstein, George DeTitta Sr., and George DeTitta, Jr.
1981	Michael Seirton	Reds	Nominated	Shared with Richard Sylbert.
1981	Assheton Gorton; Ann Mollo	The French Lieutenant's Woman	Nominated	
1981	Norman Reynolds; Leslie Dilley; Michael D. Ford	Raiders of the Lost Ark	Won	
1982	Stuart Craig; Robert W. Laing; Michael Seirton	Gandhi	Won	
1982	Tim Hutchinson; Harry Cordwell	Victor/Victoria	Nominated	Shared with Rodger Maus and William Craig Smith.
1983	Geoffrey Kirkland	The Right Stuff	Nominated	Shared with Richard Lawrence, W. Stewart Campbell, Peter R. Romero, Jim Poynter, and George R. Nelson.
1983	Roy Walker; Leslie Tomkins; Tessa Davies	Yentl	Nominated	
1983	Norman Reynolds; Fred Hole; Michael D. Ford	Star Wars Episode VI: Return of the Jedi	Nominated	Shared with James L. Schoppe.
1984	John Box; Hugh Scaife	A Passage to India	Nominated	
1985	Norman Garwood; Maggie Gray	Brazil	Nominated	
1985	Stephen Grimes	Out of Africa	Won	Shared with Josie MacAvin.
1986	Brian Ackland-Snow; Brian Savegar	A Room with a View	Won	Shared with Gianni Quaranta and Elio Altamura.
1986	Peter Lamont; Crispian Sallis	Aliens	Nominated	
1986	Stuart Craig; Jack Stephens	The Mission	Nominated	
1987	Norman Reynolds; Harry Cordwell	Empire of the Sun	Nominated	
1987	Anthony Pratt; Joanne Woollard	Hope and Glory	Nominated	
1988	Stuart Craig	Dangerous Liaisons	Won	Shared with Gérard James.
1988	Elliot Scott; Peter Howitt	Who Framed Roger Rabbit	Nominated	
1989	Norman Garwood	Glory	Nominated	Shared with Garrett Lewis.
1989	Crispian Sallis	Driving Miss Daisy	Nominated	Shared with Bruno Rubeo.
1989	Leslie Dilley	The Abyss	Nominated	Shared with Anne Kuljian.
1989	Anton Furst; Peter Young	Batman	Won	
1991	Norman Garwood	Hook	Nominated	Shared with Garrett Lewis.
1992	Stuart Craig	Chaplin	Nominated	Shared with Chris A. Butler.
1992	Ian Whittaker	Howards End	Won	Shared with Luciana Arrighi.
1993	Ian Whittaker	The Remains of the Day	Nominated	Shared with Luciana Arrighi.
1993	Ken Adam	Addams Family Values	Nominated	Shared with Marvin March.
1993	Ken Adam; Carolyn Scott	The Madness of King George	Won	
1996	Brian Morris	Evita	Nominated	Shared with Philippe Turlure.
1996	Stuart Craig; Stephenie McMillan	The English Patient	Won	
1997	Peter Lamont; Michael D. Ford	Titanic	Won	
1998	Martin Childs; Jill Quertier	Shakespeare in Love	Won	
1998	Peter Howitt	Elizabeth	Nominated	Shared with John Myhre.
1999	Eve Stewart	Topsy-Turvy	Nominated	Shared with John Bush.
1999	Roy Walker	The Talented Mr. Ripley	Nominated	Shared with Bruno Cesari.
1999	Ian Whittaker	Anna and the King	Nominated	Shared with Luciana Arrighi.
1999	Peter Young	Sleepy Hollow	Won	Shared with Rick Heinrichs.
2000	Crispian Sallis	Gladiator	Nominated	Shared with Arthur Max.
2000	Martin Childs; Jill Quertier	Quills	Nominated	
2001	Stuart Craig; Stephenie McMillan	Harry Potter and the Sorcerer's Stone	Nominated	
2001	Anna Pinnock	Gosford Park	Nominated	Shared with Stephen Altman.
2002	Alan Lee	The Lord of the Rings: The Two Towers	Nominated	Shared with Grant Major and Dan Hennah.
2003	Alan Lee	The Lord of the Rings: The Return of the King	Won	Shared with Grant Major and Dan Hennah.
2004	Gemma Jackson	Finding Neverland	Nominated	Shared with Trisha Edwards.
2004	Anthony Pratt	The Phantom of the Opera	Nominated	Shared with Celia Bobak.
2005	Stuart Craig; Stephenie McMillan	Harry Potter and the Goblet of Fire	Nominated	
2005	Sarah Greenwood; Katie Spencer	Pride & Prejudice	Nominated	
2007	Anna Pinnock	The Golden Compass	Nominated	Shared with Dennis Gassner.
2007	Nathan Crowley	The Prestige	Nominated	Shared with Julie Ochipinti.
2007	Sarah Greenwood; Katie Spencer	Atonement	Nominated	
2008	Nathan Crowley	The Dark Knight	Nominated	Shared with Peter Lando.
2009	Sarah Greenwood; Katie Spencer	Sherlock Holmes	Nominated	
2009	Maggie Gray	The Young Victoria	Nominated	Shared with Patrice Vermette.
2010	Eve Stewart; Judy Farr	The King's Speech	Nominated	
2010	Stuart Craig; Stephenie McMillan	Harry Potter and the Deathly Hallows – Part 1	Nominated	
2010	Guy Hendrix Dyas	Inception	Nominated	Shared with Larry Dias and Doug Mowat.
2011	Stuart Craig; Stephenie McMillan	Harry Potter and the Deathly Hallows – Part 2	Nominated	
2011	Lee Sandales	War Horse	Nominated	Shared with Rick Carter.
2012	Anna Pinnock	Life of Pi	Nominated	Shared with David Gropman.
2012	Eve Stewart; Anna Lynch-Robinson	Les Misérables	Nominated	
2012	Sarah Greenwood; Katie Spencer	Anna Karenina	Nominated	
2013	Andy Nicholson; Joanne Woollard	Gravity	Nominated	Shared with Rosie Goodwin.
2014	Nathan Crowley	Interstellar	Nominated	Shared with Gary Fettis.
2014	Anna Pinnock	The Grand Budapest Hotel	Won	Shared with Adam Stockhausen.
2014	Anna Pinnock	Into the Woods	Nominated	Shared with Dennis Gassner.
2014	Maria Djurkovic; Tatiana Macdonald	The Imitation Game	Nominated	
2014	Suzie Davies; Charlotte Watts	Mr. Turner	Nominated	
2015	Eve Stewart; Michael Standish	The Danish Girl	Nominated	
2016	Stuart Craig; Anna Pinnock	Fantastic Beasts and Where to Find Them	Nominated	
2016	Guy Hendrix Dyas	Passengers	Nominated	Shared with Gene Serdena.
2017	Paul Denham Austerberry	The Shape of Water	Won	Austerberry is a Canadian-English-Filipino production designer. Shared with Shane Vieau and Jeff Melvin.
2017	Sarah Greenwood; Katie Spencer	Beauty and the Beast	Nominated	
2017	Sarah Greenwood; Katie Spencer	Darkest Hour	Nominated	
2017	Nathan Crowley	Dunkirk	Nominated	Shared with Gary Fettis.
2018	Nathan Crowley	First Man	Nominated	Shared with Kathy Lucas.
2018	Alice Felton	The Favourite	Nominated	Shared with Fiona Crombie.
2019	Lee Sandales	1917	Nominated	Shared with Dennis Gassner.
2020	Nathan Crowley	Tenet	Nominated	Shared with Kathy Lucas.
2020	Peter Francis; Cathy Featherstone	The Father	Nominated	
2023	Sarah Greenwood; Katie Spencer	Barbie	Nominated	
2023	James Price; Shona Heath	Poor Things	Won	Shared with Zsuzsa Mihalek.
2023	Elli Griff	Napoleon	Nominated	Shared with Arthur Max
2024	Suzie Davies	Conclave	Nominated	Shared with Cynthia Sleiter
2024	Nathan Crowley; Lee Sandales	Wicked	Won	
2025	Alice Felton	Hamnet	Nominated	Shared with Fiona Crombie

== Best Cinematography ==
Year	Name	Film	Status	Notes
1928	Charles Rosher	Sunrise: A Song of Two Humans	Won	Shared with Karl Struss.
1934	Charles Rosher	The Affairs of Cellini	Nominated	
1944	Charles Rosher	Kismet	Nominated	Nominated for Best Colour Cinematography.
1946	Charles Rosher	The Yearling	Won	Winner for Best Colour Cinematography. Shared with Leonard Smith and Arthur E. Arling.
1947	Jack Cardiff	Black Narcissus	Won	Winner for Best Colour Cinematography.
1947	Guy Green	Great Expectations	Won	Winner for Best Black and White Cinematography.
1950	Charles Rosher	Annie Get Your Gun	Nominated	Nominated for Best Colour Cinematography.
1951	Charles Rosher	Show Boat	Nominated	Nominated for Best Colour Cinematography.
1952	Freddie Young	Ivanhoe	Nominated	Nominated for Best Colour Cinematography.
1956	Jack Cardiff	War and Peace	Nominated	Nominated for Best Colour Cinematography.
1957	Jack Hildyard	The Bridge on the River Kwai	Won	
1960	Freddie Francis	Sons and Lovers	Won	
1961	Jack Cardiff	Fanny	Nominated	Nominated for Best Colour Cinematography.
1962	Freddie Young	Lawrence of Arabia	Won	
1964	Geoffrey Unsworth	Becket	Nominated	
1964	Walter Lassally	Zorba the Greek	Won	Lassally is a German-born British cinematographer.
1965	Freddie Young	Doctor Zhivago	Won	
1966	Ted Moore	A Man for All Seasons	Won	Moore is British-born South African. Winner for Best Colour Cinematography.
1966	Kenneth Higgins	Georgy Girl	Nominated	Nominated for Best Black and White Cinematography.
1968	Oswald Morris	Oliver!	Nominated	
1969	Arthur Ibbetson	Anne of the Thousand Days	Nominated	
1970	Billy Williams	Women in Love	Nominated	
1970	Freddie Young	Ryan's Daughter	Won	
1971	Freddie Young	Nicholas and Alexandra	Nominated	
1971	Oswald Morris	Fiddler on the Roof	Won	
1972	Douglas Slocombe	Travels with My Aunt	Nominated	
1972	Geoffrey Unsworth	Cabaret	Won	
1974	Geoffrey Unsworth	Murder on the Orient Express	Nominated	
1975	John Alcott	Barry Lyndon	Won	
1977	Douglas Slocombe	Julia	Nominated	
1978	Oswald Morris	The Wiz	Nominated	
1980	Geoffrey Unsworth	Tess	Won	Posthumous win.
1981	Douglas Slocombe	Raiders of the Lost Ark	Nominated	
1981	Alex Thomson	Excalibur	Nominated	
1981	Billy Williams	On Golden Pond	Nominated	
1982	Billy Williams; Ronnie Taylor	Gandhi	Won	
1984	Ernest Day	A Passage to India	Nominated	
1984	Chris Menges	The Killing Fields	Won	
1985	David Watkin	Out of Africa	Won	
1986	Tony Pierce-Roberts	A Room with a View	Nominated	
1986	Chris Menges	The Mission	Won	
1988	Peter Biziou	Mississippi Burning	Won	
1989	Freddie Francis	Glory	Won	
1991	Adrian Biddle	Thelma & Louise	Nominated	
1992	Tony Pierce-Roberts	Howards End	Nominated	
1993	Stuart Dryburgh	The Piano	Nominated	Dryburgh is an English-born New Zealander cinematographer.
1994	Roger Deakins	The Shawshank Redemption	Nominated	
1995	Michael Coulter	Sense and Sensibility	Nominated	
1996	Roger Deakins	Fargo	Nominated	
1996	Chris Menges	Michael Collins	Nominated	
1997	Roger Deakins	Kundun	Nominated	
1998	Remi Adefarasin	Elizabeth	Nominated	
1998	Richard Greatrex	Shakespeare in Love	Nominated	
1999	Roger Pratt	The End of the Affair	Nominated	
2000	Roger Deakins	O Brother, Where Art Thou?	Nominated	
2000	John Mathieson	Gladiator	Nominated	
2001	Roger Deakins	The Man Who Wasn't There	Nominated	
2004	John Mathieson	The Phantom of the Opera	Nominated	
2006	Dick Pope	The Illusionist	Nominated	
2007	Seamus McGarvey	Atonement	Nominated	
2007	Roger Deakins	The Assassination of Jesse James by the Coward Robert Ford	Nominated	
2007	Roger Deakins	No Country for Old Men	Nominated	
2008	Roger Deakins; Chris Menges	The Reader	Nominated	
2008	Anthony Dod Mantle	Slumdog Millionaire	Won	
2009	Barry Ackroyd	The Hurt Locker	Nominated	
2010	Roger Deakins	True Grit	Nominated	
2010	Danny Cohen	The King's Speech	Nominated	
2012	Seamus McGarvey	Anna Karenina	Nominated	
2012	Roger Deakins	Skyfall	Nominated	
2013	Roger Deakins	Prisoners	Nominated	
2014	Dick Pope	Mr. Turner	Nominated	
2014	Roger Deakins	Unbroken	Nominated	
2015	Roger Deakins	Sicario	Nominated	
2017	Roger Deakins	Blade Runner 2049	Won	
2019	Roger Deakins	1917	Won	
2020	Sean Bobbitt	Judas and the Black Messiah	Nominated	Bobbitt is an American-born British cinematographer.
2020	Joshua James Richards	Nomadland	Nominated	
2022	James Friend	All Quiet on the Western Front	Won	
2022	Roger Deakins	Empire of Light	Nominated	
2024	Lol Crawley	The Brutalist	Won	

== Best Editing ==
Year	Name	Film	Status	Notes
1939	Charles Frend	Goodbye, Mr. Chips	Nominated	
1943	Owen Marks	Casablanca	Nominated	
1944	Owen Marks	Janie	Nominated	
1946	Arthur Hilton	The Killers	Nominated	
1947	Fergus McDonell	Odd Man Out	Nominated	
1948	Reginald Mills	The Red Shoes	Nominated	
1952	Ralph Kemplen	Moulin Rouge	Nominated	
1957	Peter Taylor	The Bridge on the River Kwai	Won	
1961	Alan Osbiston	The Guns of Navarone	Nominated	Osbiston is an Australian-born British film editor.
1962	Anne V. Coates	Lawrence of Arabia	Won	
1964	Anne V. Coates	Becket	Nominated	
1965	Norman Savage	Doctor Zhivago	Nominated	
1968	Ralph Kemplen	Oliver!	Nominated	
1971	Bill Butler	A Clockwork Orange	Nominated	
1972	Tom Priestley	Deliverance	Nominated	
1973	Ralph Kemplen	The Day of the Jackal	Nominated	
1975	Russell Lloyd	The Man Who Would Be King	Nominated	
1977	Marcel Durham	Julia	Nominated	Shared with Walter Murch.
1978	Gerry Hambling	Midnight Express	Nominated	
1978	Stuart Baird	Superman	Nominated	
1980	Anne V. Coates	The Elephant Man	Nominated	
1981	Terry Rawlings	Chariots of Fire	Nominated	
1981	John Bloom	The French Lieutenant's Woman	Nominated	
1982	John Bloom	Gandhi	Won	
1984	David Lean	A Passage to India	Nominated	
1984	Jim Clark	The Killing Fields	Won	
1985	Henry Richardson	Runaway Train	Nominated	
1985	Thom Noble	Witness	Won	
1985	John Bloom	A Chorus Line	Nominated	
1986	Claire Simpson	Platoon	Won	
1986	Ray Lovejoy	Aliens	Nominated	
1986	Jim Clark	The Mission	Nominated	
1988	Stuart Baird	Gorillas in the Mist	Nominated	
1989	Gerry Hambling	Mississippi Burning	Nominated	
1991	Gerry Hambling	The Commitments	Nominated	
1991	Thom Noble	Thelma & Louise	Nominated	
1992	Robert Leighton	A Few Good Men	Nominated	
1993	Anne V. Coates	In the Line of Fire	Nominated	
1993	Gerry Hambling	In the Name of the Father	Nominated	
1996	Gerry Hambling	Evita	Nominated	
1997	Peter Honess	L.A. Confidential	Nominated	
1998	David Gamble	Shakespeare in Love	Nominated	
1998	Anne V. Coates	Out of Sight	Nominated	
1999	Tariq Anwar; Christopher Greenbury	American Beauty	Nominated	Anwar is an Indian-born British film editor with an American citizenship.
2002	Martin Walsh	Chicago	Won	
2002	Peter Boyle	The Hours	Nominated	
2005	Claire Simpson	The Constant Gardener	Nominated	
2006	Clare Douglas	United 93	Nominated	Shared with Richard Pearson and Christopher Rouse.
2008	Chris Dickens	Slumdog Millionaire	Won	
2010	Jon Harris	127 Hours	Nominated	
2010	Tariq Anwar	The King's Speech	Nominated	
2013	Mark Sanger	Gravity	Won	Shared with Alfonso Cuarón.
2013	Joe Walker	12 Years a Slave	Nominated	
2014	Barney Pilling	The Grand Budapest Hotel	Nominated	
2016	Joe Walker	Arrival	Nominated	
2016	Jake Roberts	Hell or High Water	Nominated	
2017	Jon Gregory	Three Billboards Outside Ebbing, Missouri	Nominated	
2017	Jonathan Amos	Baby Driver	Nominated	Shared with Paul Machliss.
2018	Barry Alexander Brown	BlacKkKlansman	Nominated	Brown is an English born-American film director and editor.
2021	Joe Walker	Dune	Won	
2022	Eddie Hamilton	Top Gun: Maverick	Nominated	Eddie Hamilton is a British-American film editor.
2024	Nick Emerson	Conclave	Nominated	

== Best Sound ==
Year	Name	Film	Status	Notes
1939	A.W. Watkins	Goodbye, Mr. Chips	Nominated	
1950	Cyril Crowhurst	Trio	Nominated	
1952	London Films Sound Department	The Sound Barrier	Won	
1952	Pinewood Studios	The Card	Nominated	
1953	A.W. Watkins	Knights of the Round Table	Nominated	
1959	A.W. Watkins	Libel	Nominated	
1961	John Cox	The Guns of Navarone	Nominated	
1962	John Cox	Lawrence of Arabia	Won	
1964	John Cox	Becket	Nominated	
1965	A.W. Watkins	Doctor Zhivago	Nominated	Shared with Franklin Milton.
1968	Shepperton Studios Sound Department	Oliver!	Won	
1969	John Aldred	Anne of the Thousand Days	Nominated	
1970	Gordon McCallum; John Bramall	Ryan's Daughter	Nominated	
1971	Gordon McCallum; John W. Mitchell	Diamonds Are Forever	Nominated	Shared with Al Overton.
1971	Gordon McCallum; David Hildyard	Fiddler on the Roof	Won	
1971	Bob Jones; John Aldred	Mary, Queen of Scots	Nominated	
1972	David Hildyard	Cabaret	Won	Shared with Robert Knudson.
1975	Roy Charman	The Wind and the Lion	Nominated	Shared with Harry W. Tetrick, Aaron Rochin, and William McCaughey.
1978	Gordon McCallum; Graham V. Hartstone; Nicolas Le Messurier; Roy Charman	Superman	Nominated	
1980	Peter Sutton	The Empire Strikes Back	Won	Shared with Bill Varney, Steve Maslow, and Gregg Landaker.
1981	Simon Kaye	Reds	Nominated	Shared with Dick Vorisek and Tom Fleischman.
1981	Roy Charman	Raiders of the Lost Ark	Won	Shared with Bill Varney, Steve Maslow, and Gregg Landaker.
1982	Trevor Pyke	Das Boot	Nominated	Shared with Milan Bor and Mike Le Mare.
1982	Gerry Humphreys; Robin O'Donoghue; Jonathan Bates; Simon Kaye	Gandhi	Nominated	
1983	Tony Dawe	Return of the Jedi	Nominated	Shared with Ben Burtt, Gary Summers, and Randy Thom.
1984	Graham V. Hartstone; Nicolas Le Messurier; John W. Mitchell; Michael A. Carter	A Passage to India	Nominated	
1985	Gerry Humphreys	A Chorus Line	Nominated	Shared with Donald O. Mitchell, Michael Minkler, and Christopher Newman
1985	Peter Handford	Out of Africa	Won	Shared with Larry Stensvold, Gary Alexander, and Chris Jenkins
1986	Simon Kaye	Platoon	Won	Shared with John Wilkinson, Richard Rogers, and Charles Grenzbach
1986	Graham V. Hartstone; Nicolas Le Messurier; Michael A. Carter; Roy Charman	Aliens	Nominated	
1987	Bill Rowe; Ivan Sharrock	The Last Emperor	Won	
1987	Tony Dawe	Empire of the Sun	Nominated	Shared with Robert Knudson, Don Digirolamo, and John Boyd.
1988	Tony Dawe	Who Framed Roger Rabbit	Nominated	Shared with Robert Knudson, Don Digirolamo, and John Boyd.
1988	Andy Nelson; Peter Handford	Gorillas in the Mist	Nominated	Shared with Brian Saunders.
1989	Tony Dawe	Indiana Jones and the Last Crusade	Nominated	Shared with Ben Burtt, Gary Summers and Shawn Murphy.
1991	Tom Johnson	Terminator 2: Judgment Day	Won	Shared with Gary Rydstrom, Gary Summers, and Lee Orloff.
1992	Simon Kaye	The Last of the Mohicans	Won	Shared with Chris Jenkins, Doug Hemphill, and Mark Smith.
1993	Andy Nelson	Schindler's List	Nominated	Shared with Steve Pederson, Scott Millan, and Ron Judkins.
1994	Paul Massey; Chris David	Legends of the Fall	Nominated	Shared with David E. Campbell and Douglas Ganton.
1994	Tom Johnson	Forrest Gump	Nominated	Shared with Randy Thom, Dennis S. Sands, and William B. Kaplan
1995	Andy Nelson; Brian Simmons	Braveheart	Nominated	Shared with Scott Millan and Anna Behlmer.
1996	Andy Nelson; Ken Weston	Evita	Nominated	Shared with Anna Behlmer.
1997	Tom Johnson	Titanic	Won	Shared with Gary Rydstrom, Gary Summers and Mark Ulano.
1997	Tom Johnson	Contact	Nominated	Shared with Randy Thom, Dennis S. Sands, and William B. Kaplan.
1997	Paul Massey	Air Force One	Nominated	Shared with Rick Kline, Doug Hemphill, and Keith A. Wester.
1997	Andy Nelson	L.A. Confidential	Nominated	Shared with Anna Behlmer and Kirk Francis.
1998	Andy Nelson	Saving Private Ryan	Won	Shared with Gary Rydstrom, Gary Summers, and Ron Judkins.
1998	Andy Nelson	The Thin Red Line	Nominated	Shared with Anna Behlmer and Paul Brincat.
1998	Robin O'Donoghue; Dominic Lester; Peter Glossop	Shakespeare in Love	Nominated	
1999	Tom Johnson; John Midgley	Star Wars: Episode I – The Phantom Menace	Nominated	Shared with Gary Rydstrom, and Shawn Murphy.
1999	Andy Nelson	The Insider	Nominated	Shared with Doug Hemphill and Lee Orloff.
1999	Chris Munro	The Mummy	Nominated	Shared with Leslie Shatz, Chris Carpenter, and Rick Kline.
2000	Ken Weston	Gladiator	Won	Shared with Bob Beemer and Scott Millan.
2000	Ivan Sharrock	U-571	Nominated	Shared with Steve Maslow, Gregg Landaker, and Rick Kline.
2000	Tom Johnson	Cast Away	Nominated	Shared with Randy Thom, Dennis S. Sands, and William B. Kaplan
2001	Andy Nelson	Moulin Rouge!	Nominated	Shared with Anna Behlmer, Roger Savage, and Guntis Sics.
2001	Chris Munro	Black Hawk Down	Won	Shared with Michael Minkler and Myron Nettinga.
2002	Ivan Sharrock	Gangs of New York	Nominated	Shared with Tom Fleischman and Eugene Gearty.
2003	Paul Massey	Master and Commander: The Far Side of the World	Nominated	Shared with Doug Hemphill and Art Rochester.
2003	Andy Nelson	The Last Samurai	Nominated	Shared with Anna Behlmer and Jeff Wexler.
2003	Andy Nelson	Seabiscuit	Nominated	Shared with Anna Behlmer and Tod A. Maitland.
2004	Tom Johnson	The Polar Express	Nominated	Shared with Randy Thom, Dennis S. Sands, and William B. Kaplan
2005	Tom Johnson	War of the Worlds	Nominated	Shared with Anna Behlmer and Ron Judkins.
2005	Paul Massey	Walk the Line	Nominated	Shared with Doug Hemphill and Peter Kurland.
2006	Paul Massey	Pirates of the Caribbean: Dead Man's Chest	Nominated	Shared with Christopher Boyes and Lee Orloff.
2006	Andy Nelson; Ivan Sharrock	Blood Diamond	Nominated	Shared with Anna Behlmer.
2007	Paul Massey	3:10 to Yuma	Nominated	Shared with David Giammarco and Jim Stuebe.
2008	Ian Tapp; Richard Pryke	Slumdog Millionaire	Won	Shared with Resul Pookutty.
2009	Ray Beckett	The Hurt Locker	Won	Shared with Paul N.J. Ottosson.
2009	Andy Nelson	Avatar	Nominated	Shared with Christopher Boyes, Tony Johnson, and Gary Summers.
2009	Andy Nelson	Star Trek	Nominated	Shared with Anna Behlmer and Peter J. Devlin.
2010	Paul Hamblin; John Midgley	The King's Speech	Nominated	Shared with Martin Jensen.
2011	John Midgley	Hugo	Won	Shared with Tom Fleischman.
2011	Andy Nelson; Tom Johnson; Stuart Wilson	War Horse	Nominated	Shared with Gary Rydstrom
2012	Andy Nelson; Mark Paterson; Simon Hayes	Les Misérables	Won	
2012	Andy Nelson	Lincoln	Nominated	Shared with Gary Rydstrom and Ron Judkins.
2012	Stuart Wilson	Skyfall	Nominated	Shared with Scott Millan and Greg P. Russell.
2013	Chris Burdon; Mark Taylor; Mike Prestwood Smith; Chris Munro	Captain Phillips	Nominated	
2013	Christopher Benstead; Chris Munro	Gravity	Won	Shared with Skip Lievsay and Niv Adiri.
2014	Ben Wilkins	Whiplash	Won	Shared with Craig Mann and Thomas Curley.
2015	Andy Nelson	Bridge of Spies	Nominated	Shared with Gary Rydstrom and Drew Kunin.
2015	Paul Massey; Mark Taylor	The Martian	Nominated	Shared with Mac Ruth.
2015	Andy Nelson; Stuart Wilson	Star Wars: The Force Awakens	Nominated	Shared with Christopher Scarabosio.
2016	Andy Nelson	La La Land	Nominated	Shared with Ai-Ling Lee and Steve A. Morrow.
2016	Stuart Wilson	Rogue One	Nominated	Shared with David Parker and Christopher Scarabosio.
2017	Stuart Wilson	Star Wars: The Last Jedi	Nominated	Shared with David Parker, Michael Semanick, and Ren Klyce.
2017	Julian Slater; Tim Cavagin	Baby Driver	Nominated	Shared with Mary H. Ellis.
2018	Paul Massey; Tim Cavagin; John Casali	Bohemian Rhapsody	Won	
2019	Tom Johnson	Ad Astra	Nominated	Shared with Gary Rydstrom and Mark Ulano.
2019	Paul Massey	Ford v Ferrari	Nominated	
2019	Mark Taylor; Stuart Wilson	1917	Won	
2020	Oliver Tarney; Mike Prestwood Smith; William Miller	News of the World	Nominated	Shared with John Pritchett.
2021	Theo Green	Dune	Won	Shared with Mac Ruth, Mark Mangini, Doug Hemphill, and Ron Bartlett.
2021	Simon Hayes; Oliver Tarney; Paul Massey; Mark Taylor; James Harrison	No Time to Die	Nominated	
2021	James Mather; Denise Yarde; Simon Chase	Belfast	Nominated	Shared with Niv Adiri.
2021	Richard Flynn	The Power of the Dog	Nominated	Flynn is New Zealand-British. Shared with Robert Mackenzie and Tara Webb.
2021	Andy Nelson	West Side Story	Nominated	Shared with Tod A. Maitland, Gary Rydstrom, Brian Chumney, and Shawn Murphy.
2022	Andy Nelson	Elvis	Nominated	Shared with Wayne Pashley and Michael Keller.
2022	Stuart Wilson Andy Nelson	The Batman	Nominated	Shared with William Files and Douglas Murray.
2022	James H. Mather; Mark Taylor	Top Gun: Maverick	Won	Shared with Mark Weingarten, Al Nelson and Chris Burdon.
2022	Julian Howarth	Avatar: The Way of Water	Nominated	Shared with Gwendolyn Yates Whittle, Dick Bernstein, Christopher Boyes, Gary Summers, and Michael Hedges.
2023	Ian Voight	The Creator	Nominated	Shared with Erik Aadahl, Ethan Van der Ryn, Tom Ozanich, and Dean Zupancic
2023	Chris Munro; James H. Mather; Chris Burdon; Mark Taylor	Mission: Impossible – Dead Reckoning Part One	Nominated	
2023	Tarn Willers; Johnnie Burn	The Zone of Interest	Won	
2024	Paul Massey	A Complete Unknown	Nominated	Shared with Tod A. Maitland, Donald Sylvester, Ted Caplan, and David Giammarco
2024	Simon Hayes; Andy Nelson	Wicked	Nominated	Shared with Nancy Nugent Title, Jack Dolman, and John Marquis
2024	Gareth John	Dune: Part Two	Won	Shared with Richard King, Ron Bartlett, and Doug Hemphill
2025	Gareth John	F1	Won	Shared with Al Nelson, Gwendolyn Yates Whittle, Gary Rizzo and Juan Peralta

== Best Sound Editing (1963 to 2019) ==
Year	Name	Film	Status	Notes
1964	Norman Wanstall	Goldfinger	Won	
1966	Gordon Daniel	Grand Prix	Won	
1967	John Poyner	The Dirty Dozen	Won	
1986	Don Sharpe	Aliens	Won	
1988	Richard Hymns	Willow	Nominated	Shared with Ben Burtt.
1989	Richard Hymns	Indiana Jones and the Last Crusade	Won	Shared with Ben Burtt.
1991	Richard Hymns	Backdraft	Won	Shared with Gary Rydstrom.
1993	Richard Hymns	Jurassic Park	Won	Shared with Gary Rydstrom.
1998	Richard Hymns	Saving Private Ryan	Won	Shared with Gary Rydstrom.
1999	Richard Hymns	Fight Club	Nominated	Shared with Ren Klyce.
2002	Richard Hymns	Minority Report	Nominated	Shared with Gary Rydstrom.
2008	Glenn Freemantle; Tom Sayers	Slumdog Millionaire	Nominated	
2011	Richard Hymns	War Horse	Nominated	Shared with Gary Rydstrom.
2013	Glenn Freemantle	Gravity	Won	
2013	Oliver Tarney	Captain Phillips	Nominated	
2013	Richard Hymns	All Is Lost	Nominated	Shared with Steve Boeddeker.
2015	Oliver Tarney	The Martian	Nominated	
2015	Jason Canovas	The Hobbit: The Battle of the Five Armies	Nominated	Shared with Brent Burge.
2017	Theo Green	Blade Runner 2049	Nominated	Shared with Mark Mangini.
2017	Julian Slater	Baby Driver	Nominated	
2017	Alex Gibson	Dunkirk	Won	Shared with Richard King.
2018	John Warhurst; Nina Hartstone	Bohemian Rhapsody	Won	
2019	Oliver Tarney; Rachael Tate	1917	Nominated	

== Best Costume Design ==
Year	Name	Film	Status	Notes
1948	Roger K. Furse	Hamlet	Won	Won for Best Black and White Costume Design.
1950	Arlington Valles	That Forsyte Woman	Nominated	Valles is a British-born American. Nominated for Best Colour Costume Design. Shared with Walter Plunkett.
1950	Michael Whittaker	The Black Rose	Nominated	Nominated for Best Colour Costume Design.
1951	Margaret Furse	The Mudlark	Nominated	Nominated for Best Black and White Costume Design. Shared with Edward Stevenson.
1955	Beatrice Dawson	The Pickwick Papers	Nominated	Nominated for Best Black and White Costume Design.
1958	Cecil Beaton	Gigi	Won	
1959	Elizabeth Haffenden	Ben-Hur	Won	Won for Best Colour Costume Design.
1960	Arlington Valles	Spartacus	Won	Won for Best Colour Costume Design. Shared with Bill Thomas.
1964	Tony Walton	Mary Poppins	Nominated	Nominated for Best Colour Costume Design.
1964	Cecil Beaton	My Fair Lady	Won	Won for Best Colour Costume Design.
1964	Margaret Furse	Becket	Nominated	Nominated for Best Colour Costume Design.
1965	Phyllis Dalton	Doctor Zhivago	Won	Won for Best Colour Costume Design.
1965	Julie Harris	Darling	Won	Won for Best Black and White Costume Design.
1966	Jocelyn Rickards	Morgan – A Suitable Case for Treatment	Nominated	Rickards is an English-born Australian.
1966	Elizabeth Haffenden; Joan Bridge	A Man for All Seasons	Won	Won for Best Colour Costume Design.
1969	Margaret Furse	Anne of the Thousand Days	Won	
1970	Margaret Furse	Scrooge	Nominated	
1971	Margaret Furse	Mary, Queen of Scots	Nominated	
1971	Yvonne Blake	Nicholas and Alexandra	Won	Blake is a British-born Spanish. Shared with Antonio Castillo.
1972	Anthony Powell	Travels with My Aunt	Won	
1972	Anthony Mendleson	Young Winston	Nominated	
1974	Tony Walton	Murder on the Orient Express	Nominated	
1974	John Furniss	Daisy Miller	Nominated	
1975	Yvonne Blake	The Four Musketeers	Nominated	Shared with Ron Talsky.
1976	Alan Barrett	The Seven-Per-Cent Solution	Nominated	
1976	Anthony Mendleson	The Incredible Sarah	Nominated	
1977	John Mollo	Star Wars	Won	
1978	Tony Walton	The Wiz	Nominated	
1978	Anthony Powell	Death on the Nile	Won	
1979	Judy Moorcroft	The Europeans	Nominated	
1979	Shirley Ann Russell	Agatha	Nominated	
1980	Anthony Powell	Tess	Won	
1981	Tom Rand	The French Lieutenant's Woman	Nominated	
1981	Shirley Ann Russell	Reds	Nominated	
1982	John Mollo	Gandhi	Won	
1984	Judy Moorcroft	A Passage to India	Nominated	
1984	Jenny Beavan; John Bright	The Bostonians	Nominated	
1986	Jenny Beavan; John Bright	A Room with a View	Won	
1987	Jenny Beavan; John Bright	Maurice	Nominated	
1987	Bob Ringwood	Empire of the Sun	Nominated	
1987	James Acheson	The Last Emperor	Won	
1988	James Acheson	Dangerous Liaisons	Won	
1989	Phyllis Dalton	Henry V	Won	
1991	Ruth Myers	The Addams Family	Nominated	
1992	Jenny Beavan; John Bright	Howards End	Nominated	
1992	Sheena Napier	Enchanted April	Nominated	
1993	Jenny Beavan; John Bright	The Remains of the Day	Nominated	
1993	Sandy Powell	Orlando	Nominated	
1995	James Acheson	Restoration	Won	
1995	Jenny Beavan; John Bright	Sense and Sensibility	Nominated	
1995	Shuna Harwood	Richard III	Nominated	
1996	Paul Brown	Angels & Insects	Nominated	
1996	Alexandra Byrne	Hamlet	Nominated	
1996	Ruth Myers	Emma	Nominated	
1997	Sandy Powell	The Wings of the Dove	Nominated	
1998	Alexandra Byrne	Elizabeth	Nominated	
1998	Sandy Powell	Shakespeare in Love	Won	
1998	Sandy Powell	Velvet Goldmine	Nominated	
1999	Jenny Beavan	Anna and the King	Nominated	
2000	Janty Yates	Gladiator	Won	
2001	Jenny Beavan	Gosford Park	Nominated	
2002	Sandy Powell	Gangs of New York	Nominated	
2004	Alexandra Byrne	Finding Neverland	Nominated	
2004	Sandy Powell	The Aviator	Won	
2004	Bob Ringwood	Troy	Nominated	
2005	Jacqueline Durran	Pride & Prejudice	Nominated	
2005	Sandy Powell	Mrs Henderson Presents	Nominated	
2007	Marit Allen	La Vie en rose	Nominated	Posthumous nomination.
2007	Alexandra Byrne	Elizabeth: The Golden Age	Won	
2007	Jacqueline Durran	Atonement	Nominated	
2008	Michael O'Connor	The Duchess	Won	
2009	Sandy Powell	The Young Victoria	Won	
2010	Jenny Beavan	The King's Speech	Nominated	
2010	Sandy Powell	The Tempest	Nominated	
2011	Sandy Powell	Hugo	Nominated	
2011	Michael O'Connor	Jane Eyre	Nominated	
2012	Jacqueline Durran	Anna Karenina	Won	
2012	Joanna Johnston	Lincoln	Nominated	
2013	Michael O'Connor	The Invisible Woman	Nominated	
2014	Jacqueline Durran	Mr. Turner	Nominated	
2015	Jenny Beavan	Mad Max: Fury Road	Won	
2015	Sandy Powell	Carol	Nominated	
2015	Sandy Powell	Cinderella	Nominated	
2016	Joanna Johnston	Allied	Nominated	
2017	Jacqueline Durran	Beauty and the Beast	Nominated	
2017	Jacqueline Durran	Darkest Hour	Nominated	
2018	Alexandra Byrne	Mary Queen of Scots	Nominated	
2018	Sandy Powell	The Favourite	Nominated	
2018	Sandy Powell	Mary Poppins Returns	Nominated	
2019	Sandy Powell	The Irishman	Nominated	Shared With Christopher Peterson.
2019	Jacqueline Durran	Little Women	Won	
2020	Alexandra Byrne	Emma.	Nominated	
2021	Jenny Beavan	Cruella	Won	
2021	Jacqueline Durran	Cyrano	Nominated	Shared With Massimo Cantini Parrini.
2022	Jenny Beavan	Mrs. Harris Goes to Paris	Nominated	
2023	Jacqueline Durran	Barbie	Nominated	
2023	Janty Yates; Dave Crossman	Napoleon	Nominated	
2023	Holly Waddington	Poor Things	Won	
2024	Janty Yates; Dave Crossman	Gladiator II	Nominated	

== Best Makeup and Hairstyling ==
Year	Name	Film	Status	Notes
1982	Sarah Monzani	Quest for Fire	Won	Shared with Michèle Burke.
1982	Tom Smith	Gandhi	Nominated	
1984	Paul Engelen	Greystoke: The Legend of Tarzan, Lord of the Apes	Nominated	Shared with Rick Baker.
1989	Maggie Weston	The Adventures of Baron Munchausen	Nominated	Shared with Fabrizio Sforza.
1994	Paul Engelen	Mary Shelley's Frankenstein	Nominated	Shared with Daniel Parker and Carol Hemming.
1995	Peter Frampton; Lois Burwell	Braveheart	Won	Shared with Paul Pattison.
1997	Tina Earnshaw	Titanic	Nominated	Shared with Greg Cannom and Simon Thompson.
1997	Lisa Westcott	Mrs Brown	Nominated	Shared with Veronica Brebner and Beverley Binda.
1998	Lisa Westcott	Shakespeare in Love	Nominated	Shared with Veronica Brebner.
1998	Lois Burwell; Conor O'Sullivan	Saving Private Ryan	Nominated	Shared with Daniel C. Striepeke.
1998	Jenny Shircore	Elizabeth	Won	
1999	Christine Blundell	Topsy-Turvy	Won	Shared with Trefor Proud.
2003	Peter King	The Lord of the Rings: The Return of the King	Won	Shared with Richard Taylor.
2003	Martin Samuel	Pirates of the Caribbean: The Curse of the Black Pearl	Nominated	Shared with Ve Neill.
2005	Dave Elsey	Star Wars: Episode III – Revenge of the Sith	Nominated	Shared with Nikki Gooley.
2007	Jan Archibald	La Vie en rose	Won	Shared with Didier Lavergne.
2007	Martin Samuel	Pirates of the Caribbean: At World's End	Nominated	Shared with Ve Neill.
2008	Conor O'Sullivan	The Dark Knight	Nominated	Shared with John Caglione Jr.
2009	Jenny Shircore	The Young Victoria	Nominated	Shared with Jon Henry Gordon.
2010	Dave Elsey	The Wolfman	Won	Shared with Rick Baker.
2011	Nick Dudman; Lisa Tomblin	Harry Potter and the Deathly Hallows – Part 2	Nominated	Shared with Amanda Knight.
2011	Mark Coulier	The Iron Lady	Won	Shared with J. Roy Helland.
2012	Lisa Westcott; Julie Dartnell	Les Misérables	Won	
2012	Peter King	The Hobbit: An Unexpected Journey	Nominated	Shared with Rick Findlater and Tami Lane.
2012	Martin Samuel	Hitchcock	Nominated	Shared with Howard Berger and Peter Montagna.
2014	Frances Hannon; Mark Coulier	The Grand Budapest Hotel	Won	
2014	David White; Elizabeth Yianni-Georgiou	Guardians of the Galaxy	Nominated	
2015	Siân Grigg	The Revenant	Nominated	Shared with Duncan Jarman and Robert Pandini.
2016	Alessandro Bertolazzi	Suicide Squad	Won	Bertolazzi is an Italian-born English. Shared with Giorgio Gregorini and Christopher Nelson.
2017	David Malinowski; Lucy Sibbick	Darkest Hour	Won	Shared with Kazuhiro Tsuji.
2017	Daniel Phillips; Lou Sheppard	Victoria & Abdul	Nominated	
2018	Jenny Shircore; Marc Pilcher	Mary Queen of Scots	Nominated	Shared with Jessica Brooks.
2019	Naomi Donne; Tristan Versluis; Rebecca Cole	1917	Nominated	Versluis is a Zimbabwean-born English.
2019	Paul Gooch; David White	Maleficent: Mistress of Evil	Nominated	Shared with Arjen Tuiten.
2019	Jeremy Woodhead	Judy	Nominated	
2020	Mark Coulier	Pinocchio	Nominated	Shared with Dalia Colli and Francesco Pegoretti.
2020	Marese Langan; Claudia Stolze	Emma.	Nominated	Stolze is a German-born British. Shared with Laura Allen.
2021	Naomi Donne; Nadia Stacey; Julia Vernon	Cruella	Nominated	
2021	Donald Mowat	Dune	Nominated	Mowat is a Canadian-born British with an American citizenship. Shared with Eva von Bahr and Love Larson.
2022	Naomi Donne	The Batman	Nominated	Shared with Mike Marino, and Mike Fontaine.
2022	Mark Coulier	Elvis	Nominated	Shared with Jason Baird, and Aldo Signoretti.
2023	Karen Hartley Thomas; Suzi Battersby; Ashra Kelly-Blue	Golda	Nominated	
2023	Nadia Stacey; Mark Coulier; Josh Weston	Poor Things	Won	
2024	David White; Suzanne Stokes-Munton	Nosferatu	Nominated	Shared with Traci Loader
2024	Frances Hannon; Laura Blount; Sarah Nuth	Wicked	Nominated	
2025	Mike Hill	Frankenstein	Won	Shared with Jordan Samuel and Cliona Furey

== Best Original Score ==
Year	Name	Film	Status	Notes
1937	Charles Previn	One Hundred Men and a Girl	Won	Previn is an English-born American composer.
1938	Charles Previn	Mad About Music	Nominated	
1939	Charles Previn	First Love	Nominated	
1939	W. Franke Harling	Stagecoach	Won	Harling is an English-born American composer. Shared with Richard Hageman, John Leipold and Leo Shuken.
1939	Anthony Collins	Nurse Edith Cavell	Nominated	Nominated for Best Music, Original Score.
1940	Charles Previn	Spring Parade	Nominated	Nominated for Best Music, Original Score.
1940	Anthony Collins	Irene	Nominated	
1941	Anthony Collins	Sunny	Nominated	Nominated for Best Music, Scoring of a Musical Picture.
1941	Oliver Wallace	Dumbo	Won	Wallace is an English-born American composer and conductor. Shared with the American-born Frank Churchill.
1941	Charles Previn	Buck Privates	Nominated	
1942	Charles Previn	It Started with Eve	Nominated	
1943	Oliver Wallace	Victory Through Air Power	Nominated	Shared with Paul Smith and Edward H. Plumb.
1944	W. Franke Harling	Three Russian Girls	Nominated	Nominated for Best Music, Scoring of a Dramatic or Comedy Picture.
1944	Charles Previn	Song of the Open Road	Nominated	
1946	William Walton	Henry V	Nominated	
1948	Brian Easdale	The Red Shoes	Won	
1948	William Walton	Hamlet	Nominated	
1950	Oliver Wallace	Cinderella	Nominated	Shared with Paul Smith.
1950	Adolph Deutsch	Annie Get Your Gun	Won	Deutsch is an English-born American composer, conductor, and arranger. Shared with Roger Edens.
1951	Adolph Deutsch	Show Boat	Nominated	Shared with Conrad Salinger.
1951	Oliver Wallace	Alice in Wonderland	Nominated	
1953	Adolph Deutsch	The Band Wagon	Nominated	
1954	Adolph Deutsch	Seven Brides for Seven Brothers	Won	Shared with Saul Chaplin.
1955	Adolph Deutsch	Oklahoma!	Won	Shared with Robert Russell Bennett and Jay Blackton.
1955	Cyril J. Mockridge	Guys and Dolls	Nominated	Nominated for Best Music, Scoring of a Musical Picture. Shared with Jay Blackton.
1957	Malcolm Arnold	The Bridge on the River Kwai	Won	
1958	Oliver Wallace	White Wilderness	Nominated	
1963	John Addison	Tom Jones	Won	
1964	George Martin	A Hard Day's Night	Nominated	Nominated for Best Music, Scoring of Music, Adaptation or Treatment.
1966	John Barry	Born Free	Won	
1966	Ken Thorne	A Funny Thing Happened on the Way to the Forum	Won	Best Music, Scoring of Music, Adaptation or Treatment.
1967	Richard Rodney Bennett	Far from the Madding Crowd	Nominated	
1967	Leslie Bricusse	Doctor Dolittle	Nominated	
1968	John Barry	The Lion in Winter	Won	
1969	Leslie Bricusse	Goodbye, Mr. Chips	Nominated	Score of a Musical Picture-Original or Adaptation. Shared with John Williams.
1970	The Beatles	Let It Be	Won	Winner of Best Original Song Score.
1970	Leslie Bricusse; Ian Fraser	Scrooge	Nominated	Nominee for Best Original Song Score. Nominated with Herbert W. Spencer.
1970	Frank Cordell	Cromwell	Nominated	Nominated for Best Music, Original Score.
1971	John Barry	Mary, Queen of Scots	Nominated	
1971	Richard Rodney Bennett	Nicholas and Alexandra	Nominated	
1971	Peter Maxwell Davies; Peter Greenwell	The Boy Friend	Nominated	Nominated for Adaptation and Original Song Score.
1971	Leslie Bricusse; Anthony Newley	Willy Wonka & the Chocolate Factory	Nominated	Nominated for Adaptation and Original Song Score. Shared with Walter Scharf.
1972	John Addison	Sleuth	Nominated	
1972	Charles Chaplin	Limelight	Won	Shared with Raymond Rasch and Larry Russell. Film made in 1952, but not released in Los Angeles until 1972.
1973	John Cameron	A Touch of Class	Nominated	
1973	Andrew Lloyd Webber	Jesus Christ Superstar	Nominated	Nominated for Best Music, Scoring Original Song Score and/or Adaptation; Shared with German-American André Previn and Chilean-born American Herbert W. Spencer.
1974	Richard Rodney Bennett	Murder on the Orient Express	Nominated	
1974	Angela Morley	The Little Prince	Nominated	Nominated for Best Music, Scoring Original Song Score and/or Adaptation. Shared with American-born Alan Jay Lerner, Austrian-American Frederick Loewe and Australian-born Douglas Gamley.
1975	Pete Townshend	Tommy	Nominated	Nominated for Best Music, Scoring Original Song Score and/or Adaptation.
1977	Angela Morley	The Slipper and the Rose	Nominated	Nominated for Best Music, Original Song Score and Its Adaptation or Best Adaptation Score. Shared with the American-born Sherman Brothers.
1982	Leslie Bricusse	Victor/Victoria	Won	Shared with the American-born Henry Mancini. Winner of Best Music, Original Song Score and Its Adaptation or Best Adaptation Score.
1982	George Fenton	Gandhi	Nominated	Shared with Indian-born co-composer Ravi Shankar.
1985	Rod Temperton	The Color Purple	Nominated	Shared with Quincy Jones, Jeremy Lubbock, Caiphus Semenya, Andrae Crouch, Chris Boardman, Jorge Calandrelli and Joel Rosenbaum, Fred Steiner, Jack Hayes, Jerry Hey, and Randy Kerber.
1985	John Barry	Out of Africa	Won	
1987	David Byrne	The Last Emperor	Won	Shared with co-composers, Japanese-born Ryuichi Sakamoto and Chinese-born Cong Su.
1987	George Fenton	Cry Freedom	Nominated	
1988	George Fenton	Dangerous Liaisons	Nominated	
1990	John Barry	Dances with Wolves	Won	
1991	George Fenton	The Fisher King	Nominated	
1992	John Barry	Chaplin	Nominated	
1995	Patrick Doyle	Sense and Sensibility	Nominated	Original Score – Dramatic.
1996	Rachel Portman	Emma	Won	Original Score – Musical or Comedy.
1996	Patrick Doyle	Hamlet	Nominated	Original Score – Dramatic.
1997	Anne Dudley	The Full Monty	Won	Original Score – Musical or Comedy.
1998	Stephen Warbeck	Shakespeare in Love	Won	Original Score – Musical or Comedy.
1999	Rachel Portman	The Cider House Rules	Nominated	
2000	Rachel Portman	Chocolat	Nominated	
2010	Atticus Ross	The Social Network	Won	Shared with American-born co-composer Trent Reznor.
2010	John Powell	How to Train Your Dragon	Nominated	
2013	Steven Price	Gravity	Won	
2014	Gary Yershon	Mr. Turner	Nominated	
2016	Mica Levi	Jackie	Nominated	
2017	Jonny Greenwood	Phantom Thread	Nominated	
2020	Atticus Ross	Mank	Nominated	Shared with American-born co-composer Trent Reznor.
2020	Atticus Ross	Soul	Won	Shared with American-born co-composers Trent Reznor and Jon Batiste.
2021	Jonny Greenwood	The Power of the Dog	Nominated	
2023	Jerskin Fendrix	Poor Things	Nominated	
2024	Daniel Blumberg	The Brutalist	Won	
2024	John Powell	Wicked	Nominated	Shared with Stephen Schwartz
2025	Jerskin Fendrix	Bugonia	Nominated	
2025	Jonny Greenwood	One Battle After Another	Nominated	
2025	Max Richter	Hamnet	Nominated	Richter is a German-born English composer

== Best Original Song ==
Year	Name	Film	Song	Status	Notes
1940	Jule Styne	Hit Parade of 1941	"Who Am I?"	Nominated	Styne is a British-American. Shared with Walter Bullock.
1942	Jule Styne	Youth on Parade	"I've Heard That Song Before"	Nominated	Shared with Sammy Cahn.
1943	Jule Styne	Hit Parade of 1943	"Change of Heart"	Nominated	Shared with Harold Adamson.
1944	Jule Styne	Follow the Boys	"I'll Walk Alone"	Nominated	Shared with Sammy Cahn.
1945	Jule Styne	Anchors Aweigh	"I Fall in Love Too Easily"	Nominated	Shared with Sammy Cahn.
1945	Jule Styne	Tonight and Every Night	"Anywhere"	Nominated	Shared with Sammy Cahn.
1946	Jack Brooks	Canyon Passage	"Ole Buttermilk Sky"	Nominated	Shared with Hoagy Carmichael.
1948	Jule Styne	Romance on the High Seas	"It's Magic"	Nominated	Shared with Sammy Cahn.
1949	Jule Styne	It's a Great Feeling	"It's a Great Feeling"	Nominated	Shared with Sammy Cahn.
1952	Jack Brooks	Son of Paleface	"Am I in Love"	Nominated	
1953	Jack Brooks	The Caddy	"That's Amore"	Nominated	Shared with Harry Warren.
1954	Jule Styne	Three Coins in the Fountain	"Three Coins in the Fountain"	Won	Shared with Sammy Cahn.
1963	Norman Newell	Mondo Cane	"More"	Nominated	Shared with Riz Ortolani and Nino Oliviero.
1966	John Barry; Don Black	Born Free	"Born Free"	Won	
1966	Tom Springfield; Jim Dale	Georgy Girl	"Georgy Girl"	Nominated	
1967	Leslie Bricusse	Doctor Dolittle	"Talk to the Animals"	Won	
1968	Jule Styne	Funny Girl	"Funny Girl"	Nominated	Shared with Bob Merrill.
1969	Don Black	True Grit	"True Grit"	Nominated	Nominated with Elmer Bernstein.
1970	Leslie Bricusse	Scrooge	"Thank You Very Much"	Nominated	
1972	Don Black	Ben	"Ben"	Nominated	Nominated with Walter Scharf.
1973	Paul McCartney	Live and Let Die	"Live and Let Die"	Nominated	Nominated with Linda McCartney.
1974	Betty Box	Benji	"Benji's Theme (I Feel Love)"	Nominated	Shared with Euel Box.
1976	Don Black	The Pink Panther Strikes Again	"Come to Me"	Nominated	Nominated with Henry Mancini.
1983	Keith Forsey	Flashdance	"Flashdance... What a Feeling"	Won	Shared with Giorgio Moroder and Irene Cara.
1984	Phil Collins	Against All Odds	"Against All Odds (Take a Look at Me Now)"	Nominated	
1985	Rod Temperton	The Color Purple	"Miss Celie's Blues (Sister)".	Nominated	Shared with Quincy Jones and Lionel Richie.
1986	Leslie Bricusse	That's Life!	"Life in a Looking Glass"	Nominated	Shared with Henry Mancini.
1987	George Fenton	Cry Freedom	"Cry Freedom"	Nominated	Shared with Jonas Gwangwa.
1987	Keith Forsey	Beverly Hills Cop II	"Shakedown"	Nominated	Shared with Harold Faltermeyer and Bob Seger.
1987	Albert Hammond	Mannequin	"Nothing's Gonna Stop Us Now"	Nominated	Shared with Diane Warren.
1988	Phil Collins	Buster	"Two Hearts"	Nominated	Shared with Lamont Dozier.
1990	Leslie Bricusse	Home Alone	"Somewhere in My Memory"	Nominated	Shared with John Williams.
1991	Leslie Bricusse	Hook	"When You're Alone"	Nominated	Shared with John Williams.
1991	Robert John Lange	Robin Hood: Prince of Thieves	"(Everything I Do) I Do It for You"	Nominated	Shared with Michael Kamen and Bryan Adams.
1992	Tim Rice	Aladdin	"A Whole New World"	Won	Shared with Alan Menken.
1994	Elton John; Tim Rice	The Lion King	"Can You Feel the Love Tonight"	Won	
1994	Elton John; Tim Rice	The Lion King	"Circle of Life"	Nominated	
1994	Elton John; Tim Rice	The Lion King	"Hakuna Matata"	Nominated	
1995	Robert John Lange	Don Juan DeMarco	"Have You Ever Really Loved a Woman"	Nominated	Shared with Michael Kamen and Bryan Adams.
1996	Robert John Lange	The Mirror Has Two Faces	"I've Finally Found Someone"	Nominated	Shared with Barbra Streisand, Marvin Hamlisch, and Bryan Adams.
1996	Tim Rice; Andrew Lloyd Webber	Evita	"You Must Love Me"	Won	
1999	Phil Collins	Tarzan	"You'll Be in My Heart"	Won	
2000	Sting; David Hartley	The Emperor's New Groove	"My Funny Friend and Me"	Nominated	
2001	Sting	Kate & Leopold	"Until..."	Nominated	
2001	Paul McCartney	Vanilla Sky	"Vanilla Sky"	Nominated	
2002	Adam Clayton; The Edge	Gangs of New York	"The Hands That Built America"	Nominated	Clayton and The Edge are English/Irish musicians. Shared with Bono and Larry Mullen Jr.
2003	Annie Lennox	The Lord of the Rings: The Return of the King	"Into the West"	Won	Shared with Fran Walsh and Howard Shore.
2003	Elvis Costello	Cold Mountain	"Scarlet Tide"	Nominated	Nominated with T-Bone Burnett.
2003	Sting	Cold Mountain	"You Will Be My Ain True Love"	Nominated	
2004	Charles Hart; Andrew Lloyd Webber	The Phantom of the Opera	"Learn to Be Lonely"	Nominated	
2008	M.I.A.	Slumdog Millionaire	"O Saya"	Nominated	Shared with A. R. Rahman.
2008	Peter Gabriel	WALL-E	"Down to Earth"	Nominated	Shared with Thomas Newman.
2010	Dido; Rollo Armstrong	127 Hours	"If I Rise"	Nominated	Shared with A. R. Rahman.
2012	Adele; Paul Epworth	Skyfall	"Skyfall"	Won	
2012	Herbert Kretzmer	Les Misérables	"Suddenly"	Nominated	Kretzmer is a South African-born English. Shared with Alain Boublil and Claude-Michel Schönberg.
2013	Adam Clayton; The Edge	Mandela: Long Walk to Freedom	"Ordinary Love"	Nominated	Clayton and The Edge are English/Irish musicians. Shared with Bono and Larry Mullen, Jr.
2015	Antony Hegarty	Racing Extinction	"Manta Ray"	Nominated	Shared with J. Ralph.
2015	Jimmy Napes; Sam Smith	Spectre	"Writing's On the Wall"	Won	
2016	Sting	Jim: The James Foley Story	"The Empty Chair"	Nominated	Shared with J. Ralph.
2018	Mark Ronson	A Star Is Born	"Shallow"	Won	Shared with Lady Gaga, Anthony Rossomando, and Andrew Wyatt.
2019	Cynthia Erivo	Harriet	"Stand Up"	Nominated	Shared with Joshuah Brian Campbell.
2019	Elton John; Bernie Taupin	Rocketman	"(I'm Gonna) Love Me Again"	Won	
2020	Daniel Pemberton; Celeste Waite	The Trial of the Chicago 7	"Hear My Voice"	Nominated	
2021	Van Morrison	Belfast	"Down to Joy"	Nominated	
2022	David Byrne	Everything Everywhere All at Once	"This Is a Life"	Nominated	Shared with Ryan Lott and Mitski.
2023	Mark Ronson	Barbie	"I'm Just Ken"	Nominated	Shared with Andrew Wyatt.
2024	Elton John; Bernie Taupin	Elton John: Never Too Late	"Never Too Late"	Nominated	Shared with Brandi Carlile and Andrew Watt
2025	Nicholas Pike	Viva Verdi!	"Sweet Dreams of Joy"	Nominated	

== Best Visual Effects ==
Year	Name	Film	Status	Notes
1940	R. T. Layton	The Long Voyage Home	Nominated	Shared with Ray Binger, and Thomas T. Moulton.
1943	Ronald Neame; C. C. Stevens	One of Our Aircraft Is Missing	Nominated	
1946	Tom Howard	Blithe Spirit	Won	
1955	Associated British Picture Corporation Ltd.	The Dam Busters	Nominated	
1958	Tom Howard	Tom Thumb	Won	
1961	Bill Warrington; Chris Greenham	The Guns of Navarone	Won	
1961	Eustace Lycett	The Absent-Minded Professor	Nominated	Shared with Robert A. Mattey.
1964	Peter Ellenshaw; Eustace Lycett	Mary Poppins	Won	Shared with Hamilton Luske.
1965	John Stears	Thunderball	Won	
1967	Albert Whitlock	Tobruk	Nominated	Shared with Howard A. Anderson.
1971	Alan Maley; Eustace Lycett	Bedknobs and Broomsticks	Won	Shared with Danny Lee.
1974	Albert Whitlock	Earthquake	Won	Special Achievement Award for visual effects. Shared with Frank Brendel, and Glen Robinson.
1975	Albert Whitlock	The Hindenburg	Won	Special Achievement Award for visual effects. Shared with Frank Brendel, and Glen Robinson.
1977	John Stears	Star Wars Episode IV: A New Hope	Won	Shared with John Dykstra, Richard Edlund, Grant McCune, and Robert Blalack.
1978	Roy Field; Derek Meddings; Les Bowie; Colin Chilvers; Denys Coop	Superman: The Movie	Won	Bowie was Canadian-born. Posthumous Win for Bowie. Special Achievement Award for visual effects. Shared with Zoran Perisic.
1979	Brian Johnson; Nick Allder; Dennis Ayling	Alien	Won	Shared with H. R. Giger, and Carlo Rambaldi.
1979	Derek Meddings	Moonraker	Nominated	Shared with Paul Wilson, and John Evans.
1979	Peter Ellenshaw; Eustace Lycett	The Black Hole	Nominated	Shared with Art Cruickshank, Danny Lee, Harrison Ellenshaw, and Joe Hale.
1980	Brian Johnson	The Empire Strikes Back	Won	Shared with Richard Edlund, Dennis Muren, and Bruce Nicholson.
1981	Kit West	Dragonslayer	Nominated	Shared with Dennis Muren, Phil Tippett, and Ken Ralston.
1981	Kit West	Raiders of the Lost Ark	Won	Shared with Richard Edlund, Bruce Nicholson, and Joe Johnston.
1984	George Gibbs	Indiana Jones and the Temple of Doom	Won	Shared with Dennis Muren, Michael J. McAlister, and Lorne Peterson.
1985	Kit West	Young Sherlock Holmes	Nominated	Shared with Dennis Muren, John Ellis, and David W. Allen.
1985	Ian Wingrove	Return to Oz	Nominated	Shared with Will Vinton, Zoran Perisic, and Michael Lloyd.
1986	John Richardson	Aliens	Won	Shared with Robert Skotak, Stan Winston, and Susanne Benson.
1988	Richard Williams; George Gibbs	Who Framed Roger Rabbit	Won	Richard Williams was a Canadian–British animator, voice artist, and writer. Shared with Ken Ralston, and Edward Jones.
1989	Richard Conway; Kent Houston	The Adventures of Baron Munchausen	Nominated	
1992	George Gibbs	Alien 3	Nominated	Shared with Richard Edlund, Alec Gillis, and Tom Woodruff Jr.
1993	John Richardson	Cliffhanger	Nominated	Shared with Neil Krepela, John Bruno, and Pamela Easley.
1995	Neal Scanlan	Babe	Won	Shared with Scott E. Anderson, Charles Gibson, and John Cox.
1996	Kit West	Dragonheart	Nominated	Shared with Scott Squires, Phil Tippett, and James Straus.
1997	John Richardson	Starship Troopers	Nominated	Shared with Phil Tippett, Scott E. Anderson, and Alec Gillis.
1998	Nicholas Brooks	What Dreams May Come	Won	Shared with Joel Hynek, Stuart Robertson, and Kevin Mack.
1999	Janek Sirrs; Jon Thum	The Matrix	Won	Shared with John Gaeta and Steve Courtley.
2000	Tim Burke; Neil Corbould; Rob Harvey	Gladiator	Won	Shared with John Nelson.
2004	Tim Burke; John Richardson; Roger Guyett	Harry Potter and the Prisoner of Azkaban	Nominated	Shared with Bill George.
2006	Neil Corbould; Jon Thum	Superman Returns	Nominated	Shared with Richard R. Hoover, and Mark Stetson.
2006	Chas Jarrett	Poseidon	Nominated	Shared with Boyd Shermis, Kim Libreri, and John Frazier.
2007	Ben Morris; Trevor Wood	The Golden Compass	Won	Shared with Michael L. Fink, and Bill Westenhofer.
2008	Chris Corbould; Tim Webber; Nick Davis; Paul Franklin	The Dark Knight	Nominated	
2009	Paul Kavanagh; Roger Guyett	Star Trek	Nominated	Shared with Burt Dalton, and Russell Earl.
2010	Tim Burke; John Richardson; Christian Manz	Harry Potter and the Deathly Hallows – Part 1	Nominated	Shared with Nicholas Aithadi.
2010	Chris Corbould; Paul Franklin; Andrew Lockley; Peter Bebb	Inception	Won	
2010	Janek Sirrs	Iron Man 2	Nominated	Shared with Ben Snow, Ged Wright, and Dan Sudick.
2011	Joss Williams	Hugo	Won	Shared with Rob Legato, Ben Grossmann, and Alex Henning.
2011	Tim Burke; John Richardson; David Vickery	Harry Potter and the Deathly Hallows – Part 2	Nominated	Shared with Greg Butler.
2012	Neil Corbould; Michael Dawson; Phil Brennan	Snow White and the Huntsman	Nominated	Shared with Cedric Nicolas-Troyan.
2012	Charley Henley; Richard Stammers; Martin Hill; Trevor Wood	Prometheus	Nominated	
2012	Janek Sirrs	The Avengers	Nominated	Shared with Jeff White, Guy Williams, and Dan Sudick.
2013	Roger Guyett	Star Trek Into Darkness	Nominated	Shared with Patrick Tubach, Ben Grossmann, and Burt Dalton.
2013	Christopher Townsend	Iron Man 3	Nominated	Shared with Guy Williams, Erik Nash, and Dan Sudick.
2013	Neil Corbould; Tim Webber; Chris Lawrence	Gravity	Won	Shared with David Shirk.
2014	Paul Franklin; Andrew Lockley	Interstellar	Won	Shared with Ian Hunter, and Scott Fisher.
2014	Jonathan Fawkner; Paul Corbould	Guardians of the Galaxy	Nominated	Shared with Stephane Ceretti, and Nicolas Aithadi.
2014	Richard Stammers	X-Men: Days of Future Past	Nominated	Shared with Lou Pecora, Tim Crosbie, and Cameron Waldbauer.
2015	Chris Lawrence; Richard Stammers; Anders Langlands; Steven Warner	The Martian	Nominated	
2015	Chris Corbould; Roger Guyett; Neal Scanlan	Star Wars: The Force Awakens	Nominated	Shared with Patrick Tubach.
2015	Mark Williams Ardington; Sara Bennett; Andrew Whitehurst; Paul Norris	Ex Machina	Won	
2015	Tom Wood; Andy Williams	Mad Max: Fury Road	Nominated	Shared with Andrew Jackson and Dan Oliver.
2016	Neil Corbould	Rogue One	Nominated	Shared with John Knoll, Mohen Leo, and Hal Hickel.
2016	Paul Corbould; Richard Bluff	Doctor Strange	Nominated	Shared with Stephane Ceretti, and Vincent Cirelli.
2016	Oliver Jones	Kubo and the Two Strings	Nominated	Shared with Steve Emerson, Brian McLean, and Brad Schiff.
2017	Paul Lambert	Blade Runner 2049	Won	Shared with John Nelson, Gerd Nefzer, and Richard R. Hoover.
2017	Christopher Townsend; Jonathan Fawkner	Guardians of the Galaxy Vol. 2	Nominated	Shared with Guy Williams, and Dan Sudick.
2017	Ben Morris; Neal Scanlan; Chris Corbould; Mike Mulholland	Star Wars: The Last Jedi	Nominated	
2018	Paul Lambert; Tristan Myles	First Man	Won	Myles is a British-Canadian. Shared with Ian Hunter, and J. D. Schwalm.
2018	Chris Lawrence; Chris Corbould; Michael Eames; Theo Jones	Christopher Robin	Nominated	
2018	Roger Guyett	Ready Player One	Nominated	Shared with Grady Cofer, Matthew E. Butler, and David Shirk.
2018	Neal Scanlan; Dominic Tuohy	Solo: A Star Wars Story	Nominated	Shared with Rob Bredow, and Patrick Tubach.
2019	Dominic Tuohy	1917	Won	Shared with Guillaume Rocheron, and Greg Butler.
2019	Roger Guyett; Neal Scanlan; Dominic Tuohy	Star Wars: The Rise of Skywalker	Nominated	Shared with Patrick Tubach.
2020	Anders Langlands	Mulan	Nominated	Shared with Sean Faden, Seth Maury, and Steven Ingram.
2020	Andrew Lockley	Tenet	Won	Shared with Andrew Jackson, David Lee, and Scott Fisher.
2020	Matthew Kasmir; Chris Lawrence; Max Solomon; David Watkins	The Midnight Sky	Nominated	
2020	Nick Davis; Greg Fisher; Ben Jones	The One and Only Ivan	Nominated	Shared with Santiago Colomo Martinez.
2021	Paul Lambert; Tristan Myles	Dune	Won	Shared with Brian Connor, and Gerd Nefzer.
2021	Charlie Noble; Joel Green; Jonathan Fawkner; Chris Corbould	No Time to Die	Nominated	
2021	Christopher Townsend	Shang-Chi and the Legend of the Ten Rings	Nominated	Shared with Joe Farrell, Sean Noel Walker, and Dan Oliver.
2022	Anders Langlands; Dominic Tuohy	The Batman	Nominated	Shared with Dan Lemmon, and Russell Earl.
2023	Charley Henley; Neil Corbould	Napoleon	Nominated	Shared with Luc-Ewen Martin-Fenouillet and Simone Coco.
2023	Ian Comley; Andrew Roberts; Neil Corbould	The Creator	Nominated	Shared with Jay Cooper.
2023	Alex Wuttke; Jeff Sutherland; Neil Corbould	Mission: Impossible – Dead Reckoning Part One	Nominated	Shared with Simone Coco.
2024	Luke Millar	Better Man	Nominated	Shared with David Clayton, Keith Herft, and Peter Stubbs
2024	Paul Lambert; Rhys Salcombe	Dune: Part Two	Won	Shared with Stephen James and Gerd Nefzer
2024	Jonathan Fawkner; Paul Corbould	Wicked	Nominated	Shared with Pablo Helman and David Shirk
2025	Robert Harrington; Keith Dawson	F1	Nominated	Shared with Ryan Tudhope and Nicolas Chevallier
2025	David Vickery; Stephen Aplin; Neil Corbould	Jurassic World Rebirth	Nominated	Shared with Charmaine Chan
2025	Charlie Noble; David Zaretti	The Lost Bus	Nominated	Shared with Russell Bowen and Brandon K. McLaughlin

== Best Live Action Short Film ==
Year	Name	Film	Status	Notes
1935	Gaumont British	Wings Over Everest	Won	Shared with Skibo Productions.
1952	London Films	Bridge of Time	Nominated	
1952	Crown Film Unit	Royal Scotland	Nominated	
1952	Norman McLaren	Neighbours	Nominated	
1955	George K. Arthur	On the Twelfth Day	Nominated	
1956	George K. Arthur	The Bespoke Overcoat	Won	
1957	Norman McLaren	A Chairy Tale	Nominated	
1957	James Carr	Foothold on Antarctica	Nominated	
1958	Ian Ferguson	Journey Into Spring	Nominated	
1959	Ian Ferguson	Between the Tides	Nominated	
1959	Peter Sellers	The Running, Jumping and Standing-Still Film	Nominated	
1963	James Hill	Home-Made Car	Nominated	
1963	Christopher Miles	Six-Sided Triangle	Nominated	
1965	Edgar Anstey	Snow	Nominated	
1966	Edgar Anstey	Wild Wings	Won	
1966	Derek Williams	Turkey the Bridge	Nominated	
1974	Julian ChagrinClaude Chagrin	The Concert	Nominated	Chagrin is a British-Israeli comedy actor.
1976	Julian ChagrinClaude Chagrin	The Morning Spider	Nominated	
1982	Andrew Birkin	Sredni Vashtar	Nominated	
1983	Ian Emes	Goodie-Two-Shoes	Nominated	
1989	Jonathan Tammuz	The Childeater	Nominated	Tammuz is a British-Canadian film director.
1990	Peter Cattaneo; Barnaby Thompson	Dear Rosie	Nominated	
1992	Kenneth Branagh	Swan Song	Nominated	
1992	Christian M. Taylor	The Lady in Waiting	Nominated	Taylor is an English-American screenwriter, director, and producer.
1994	Peter Capaldi; Ruth Kenley-Letts	Franz Kafka's It's a Wonderful Life	Won	Tied with Trevor.
1995	Luke Cresswell; Steve McNicholas	Brooms	Nominated	
2004	Andrea Arnold	Wasp	Won	
2005	Martin McDonagh	Six Shooter	Won	McDonagh is Irish-British playwright, screenwriter, producer, and film director, born in London to Irish parents.
2005	Sean Ellis	Cashback	Nominated	Shared with Lene Bausager.
2007	Daniel Barber	The Tonto Woman	Nominated	Shared with Matthew Brown.
2013	Mark Gill; Baldwin Li	The Voorman Problem	Nominated	
2014	Mat Kirkby; James Lucas	The Phone Call	Won	Lucas is a British/New Zealand screenwriter and film producer.
2015	Serena Armitage	Stutterer	Won	Shared with Benjamin Cleary.
2015	Basil Khalil	Ave Maria	Nominated	Khalil is a British-Palestinian filmmaker. Shared with Eric Dupont.
2015	Jamie Donoughue	Shok	Nominated	
2017	Rachel Shenton; Chris Overton	The Silent Child	Won	
2020	Martin Desmond Roe	Two Distant Strangers	Won	Roe is a British-American film and television director, writer and producer. Shared with Travon Free.
2021	Riz Ahmed; Aneil Karia	The Long Goodbye	Won	
2022	Tom Berkeley; Ross White	An Irish Goodbye	Won	
2023	Nazrin Choudhury	Red, White and Blue	Nominated	Shared with Sara McFarlane.
2024	Darwin Shaw	The Last Ranger	Nominated	Shared with Cindy Lee
2025	Lee Knight; James Dean	A Friend of Dorothy	Nominated	
2025	Steve Pinder	Jane Austen's Period Drama	Nominated	Shared with Julia Aks.
2025	Alexandre Singh	Two People Exchanging Saliva	Won	Singh is a British-French filmmaker. Shared with Natalie Musteata

== Special awards ==
Year	Name	Award
1928	Charles Chaplin	Honorary Academy Award for The Circus.
1939	William Cameron Menzies	Honorary Academy Award for Gone With the Wind.
1940	Bob Hope	Honorary Academy Award.
1941	British Ministry of Information	Honorary Academy Award for Target for Tonight.
1942	Noël Coward	Honorary Academy Award for In Which We Serve.
1944	Bob Hope	Honorary Academy Award.
1946	Laurence Olivier	Honorary Academy Award for Henry V.
1947	Albert E. Smith	Honorary Academy Award.
1952	Bob Hope	Honorary Academy Award.
1954	Vincent Winter	Honorary Academy Award for The Little Kidnappers.
1954	Jon Whiteley	Honorary Academy Award for The Little Kidnappers.
1959	Bob Hope	Jean Hersholt Humanitarian Award.
1960	Hayley Mills	Honorary Academy Award for Pollyanna.
1961	Stan Laurel	Honorary Academy Award.
1965	Bob Hope	Honorary Academy Award
1967	Alfred Hitchcock	Irving G. Thalberg Memorial Award.
1969	Cary Grant	Honorary Academy Award.
1971	Charles Chaplin	Honorary Academy Award.
1978	Laurence Olivier	Honorary Academy Award.
1979	Alec Guinness	Honorary Academy Award.
1992	Elizabeth Taylor	Jean Hersholt Humanitarian Award.
1993	Deborah Kerr	Honorary Academy Award.
2000	Jack Cardiff	Honorary Academy Award.
2002	Peter O'Toole	Honorary Academy Award.
2010	Kevin Brownlow	Honorary Academy Award.
2013	Angela Lansbury	Honorary Academy Award.
2016	Anne V. Coates	Honorary Academy Award.

== Nominations and winners ==
No. of wins	No. of nominations
396	1608

== Multiple wins and nominations ==
Wins	Nominations	Individual
5	7	John Barry
4	6	John Box
4	6	Nick Park
4	4	Paul Lambert
3	15	Sandy Powell
3	12	Jenny Beavan
3	11	Stuart Craig
3	7	Charlie Chaplin
3	6	Anthony Powell
3	6	Daniel Day-Lewis
3	5	Adolph Deutsch
3	5	Freddie Young
3	5	Tim Rice
3	5	Mark Coulier
3	3	Vernon Dixon
3	3	James Acheson
3	3	Andrew Lockley
2	24	Andy Nelson
2	16	Roger Deakins
2	11	David Lean
2	9	Jacqueline Durran
2	8	Christopher Nolan
2	6	Charles Rosher
2	6	Maggie Smith
2	6	Michael Caine
2	6	Anthony Hopkins
2	5	Olivia de Havilland
2	5	Jack Cardiff
2	5	Elizabeth Taylor
2	5	Ken Adam
2	5	Michael D. Ford
2	5	Elton John
2	5	Chris Munro
2	4	Peter Ustinov
2	4	Geoffrey Unsworth
2	4	Glenda Jackson
2	4	Chris Menges
2	3	Robert Bolt
2	3	Ruth Prawer Jhabvala
2	3	Malcolm Clarke
2	3	Christopher Hampton
2	3	Atticus Ross
2	5	Emma Thompson
2	2	Vivien Leigh
2	2	Freddie Francis
2	2	David Hildyard
2	2	Richard Attenborough
2	2	Simon Chinn
2	2	Tristan Myles
1	11	Laurence Olivier
1	9	Peter O'Toole
1	9	Paul Massey
1	8	Judi Dench
1	7	Greer Garson
1	7	Nathan Crowley
1	7	Kate Winslet
1	4	Helen Mirren
1	4	Ben Kingsley
1	4	Christian Bale
1	4	Anthony Minghella
1	3	Ronald Colman
1	3	Charles Laughton
1	3	Oswald Morris
1	3	Gary Oldman
1	3	Olivia Colman
1	2	Rachel Weisz
1	2	Steve McQueen
1	2	Peter Straughan
1	2	Eddie Redmayne
1	2	Daniel Kaluuya
0	7	Richard Burton
0	4	Claude Rains
0	3	Douglas Slocombe
0	2	Leslie Howard
0	2	Terence Rattigan

== See also ==
- British Academy Film Awards
- Cinema of Scotland
- Cinema of Wales
- Cinema of Northern Ireland
- Cinema of Ireland
- List of British actors
- Lists of British films
