= Karen Thomas =

Karen Thomas may refer to:

- Karen P. Thomas, composer
- J. Karen Thomas, American actress, singer, and voice artist
- Karen Hartley Thomas, British make-up artist and hairstylist.
- Karen Thomas (curler), 1998 Scott Tournament of Hearts
