= Suzi Battersby =

British make-up artist

- Occupation: Make-up artist

Suzi Battersby is a British make-up artist. She was nominated for an Academy Award in the category Best Makeup and Hairstyling for the film Golda.

== Selected filmography ==
- Dead Snow 2: Red vs. Dead (2014)
- The Kid Who Would Be King (2019)
- Golda (2023; co-nominated with Karen Hartley Thomas and Ashra Kelly-Blue)
- Greatest Days (2023)
