= Ashra Kelly-Blue =

British make-up artist

- Occupation: Make-up artist

Ashra Kelly-Blue is a British make-up artist. She was nominated for an Academy Award in the category Best Makeup and Hairstyling for the film Golda.

== Selected filmography ==
- Golda (2023; co-nominated with Karen Hartley Thomas and Suzi Battersby)
