= Michael D. Ford =

English film art director and set decorator (1928–2018)

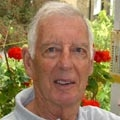
- Ford in 2006
- Born: Michael Dickins Ford; 11 June 1928; England
- Died: 31 May 2018 (aged 89)
- Education: Goldsmiths College
- Occupations: Film art director and set decorator
- Years active: 1960–1999
- Known for: Raiders of the Lost Ark (1981); Titanic (1997)
- Awards: Academy Award for Best Art Direction (1982, 1998)

Michael Dickins Ford (11 June 1928 – 31 May 2018) was an English film art director and set decorator.

== Life and career ==
Born in southern England, Ford trained as an illustrator at Goldsmiths College, London. He worked as a scenic artist before "drifting into" the film industry via commercial television. His first film credit was Man in the Moon (1960); among his first major projects were The Anniversary (1968), with Bette Davis, and Kelly's Heroes (1970).

In 1982, Ford was a co-recipient of the Academy Award for Best Art Direction for his contributions as set decorator to Raiders of the Lost Ark (1981). This was preceded by a nomination for The Empire Strikes Back (1980) and followed by nominations for Return of the Jedi (1983) and Empire of the Sun (1987). He won his second Academy Award in 1998 for his work on Titanic (1997). Ford also served in a design capacity on the James Bond films The Living Daylights (1987), Licence to Kill (1989) and GoldenEye (1995). He died in 2018.
