= Karen Hartley Thomas =

British make-up artist and hairstylist

- Occupations: Make-up artist, hairstylist

Karen Hartley Thomas is a British make-up artist and hairstylist. She was nominated for an Academy Award in the category Best Makeup and Hairstyling for the film Golda.

In addition to her Academy Award nomination, she was nominated for two Primetime Emmy Awards in the category Outstanding Hairstyling for a Miniseries or a Movie.

== Selected filmography ==
- The Scapegoat (2012)
- Le Week-End (2013)
- Get Santa (2014)
- On Chesil Beach (2017)
- The Corrupted (2019)
- The Personal History of David Copperfield (2019)
- The Courier (2020)
- The Duke (2020)
- Persuasion (2022)
- The Son (2022)
- Golda (2023)
- Greatest Days (2023)
- Red, White & Royal Blue (2023)
- One Life (2023)
