= Art Directors Guild Awards 2022 =

Annual US film and television awards ceremony

27th Art Directors Guild Awards
- Date: February 18, 2023

The 27th Art Directors Guild Excellence in Production Design Awards, honoring the best production designers in film, television and media of 2022, was held on February 18, 2023, at the InterContinental Hotel in Los Angeles, California. The nominations were announced on January 9, 2023. Yvette Nicole Brown hosted the ceremony for the second consecutive year.

== Winners and nominees ==
=== Film ===
Excellence in Production Design for a Contemporary Film	Excellence in Production Design for a Period Film
Glass Onion: A Knives Out Mystery – Rick Heinrichs; Bardo, False Chronicle of a Handful of Truths – Eugenio Caballero; Bullet Train – David Scheunemann; Tár – Marco Bittner Rosser; Top Gun: Maverick – Jeremy Hindle	Babylon – Florencia Martin; All Quiet on the Western Front – Christian M. Goldbeck; Elvis – Catherine Martin and Karen Murphy; The Fabelmans – Rick Carter; White Noise – Jess Gonchor
Excellence in Production Design for a Fantasy Film	Excellence in Production Design for an Animated Film
Everything Everywhere All at Once – Jason Kisvarday; Avatar: The Way of Water – Dylan Cole and Ben Procter; The Batman – James Chinlund; Black Panther: Wakanda Forever – Hannah Beachler; Nope – Ruth De Jong	Guillermo del Toro's Pinocchio – Guy Davis and Curt Enderle; Lightyear – Tim Evatt; Marcel the Shell with Shoes On – Liz Toonkel; Puss in Boots: The Last Wish – Nate Wragg; Turning Red – Rona Liu

=== Television ===
Excellence in Production Design for a One-Hour Contemporary Single-Camera Series	Excellence in Production Design for a One-Hour Period Single-Camera Series
Severance (Episode: "Good News About Hell") – Jeremy Hindle (Apple TV+); Better Call Saul (Episodes: "Wine and Roses", "Nippy") – Denise Pizzini (AMC); Euphoria (Episodes: "You Who Cannot See, Think of Those Who Can", "The Theater and Its Double", "All My Life, My Heart Has Yearned for a Thing I Cannot Name") – Jason Baldwin Stewart (HBO); Ozark (Episodes: "The Beginning of the End", "Let the Great World Spin", "City on the Make") – David Bomba (Netflix); The White Lotus (Episode: "Ciao") – Cristina Onori (HBO)	Pachinko (Episode: "Chapter One") – Mara LePere-Schloop (Netflix); The Crown (Episode: "Ipatiev House") – Martin Childs (Netflix); The Gilded Age (Episode: "Never the New") – Bob Shaw (HBO); The Marvelous Mrs. Maisel (Episodes: "Maisel vs. Lennon: The Cut Contest", "How Do You Get to Carnegie Hall?") – Bill Groom (Prime Video); Peaky Blinders (Episode: "Black Day") – Nicole Northridge (Netflix)
Excellence in Production Design for a One-Hour Fantasy Single-Camera Series	Excellence in Production Design for a Half Hour Single-Camera Television Series
The Lord of the Rings: The Rings of Power (Episode: "Adar") – Ramsey Avery (Prime Video); Andor (Episode: "Rix Road") – Luke Hull (Disney+); House of the Dragon (Episode: "The Heirs of the Dragon") – Jim Clay (HBO); Stranger Things (Episode: "Chapter Seven: The Massacre at Hawkins Lab") – Chris Trujillo (Netflix); Wednesday (Episode: "Woe is the Loneliest Number") – Mark Scruton (Netflix)	Our Flag Means Death (Episode: "Pilot") – Ra Vincent (HBO Max); Emily in Paris (Episodes: "What's It All About...", "How to Lose a Designer in 10 Days") – Anne Seibel (Netflix); Hacks (Episode: "Trust the Process") – Alec Contestabile (HBO Max); Only Murders in the Building (Episode: "Framed") – Patrick Howe (Hulu); What We Do in the Shadows (Episodes: "The Grand Opening", "The Night Market", "Pine Barrens") – Shayne Fox (FX)
Excellence in Production Design for a Multi-Camera Series	Excellence in Production Design for a Television Movie or Limited Series
How I Met Your Father (Episode: "Pilot") – Glenda Rovello (Hulu); Bob Hearts Abishola (Episodes: "Inner Boss Bitch", "Two Rusty Tractors", "Estee Lauder and Goat Meat") – Francoise Cherry-Cohen (CBS); The Conners (Episodes: "Sex, Lies, and House Hunting", "The Best Laid Plans", "A Contrabassoon and A Sinking Feeling") – Jerry Dunn (ABC); The Neighborhood (Episode: "Welcome to the Remodel") – Wendell Johnson (CBS); United States of Al (Episodes: "Kiss/Maach", "Divorce/Talaq", "Sock/Jeraab") – Daren Janes (CBS)	Guillermo del Toro's Cabinet of Curiosities – Tamara Deverell (Netflix); Moon Knight – Stefania Cella (Disney+); Obi-Wan Kenobi – Todd Cherniawsky and Doug Chiang (Disney+); Pinocchio – Doug Chiang and Stefan Dechant (Disney+); Station Eleven – Ruth Ammon (HBO Max)
Excellence in Production Design for a Variety Special	Excellence in Production Design for a Variety, Reality, or Competition Series
94th Academy Awards – David Korins (ABC); 64th Annual Grammy Awards – Kristen Merlino (CBS); Hasan Minhaj: The King's Jester – Scott Pask (Netflix); Miley's New Year's Eve Party – Keith Raywood (NBC); Trevor Noah: I Wish You Would – Star Theodos Kahn (Netflix)	Saturday Night Live (Episode: "Host: Jack Harlow") – Keith Raywood, Eugene Lee, Akira Yoshimura, and N. Joseph De Tullio (NBC); A Black Lady Sketch Show (Episodes: "Anybody Have Something I Can Flog Myself With?", "Bounce Them Coochies, Y'All!", "Peaches and Eggplants for Errbody!") – Cindy Chao and Michelle Yu (HBO); Lizzo's Watch Out for the Big Grrrls (Episode: "HBCYOU Band") – James McGowan (Prime Video); RuPaul's Drag Race (Episodes: "Catwalk", "60's Girl Groups", "Daytona Wind") – Gianna Costa (VH1); Waffles + Mochi's Restaurant (Episode: "Honey") – Darcy E. Prevost (Netflix)

=== Short Form ===
Excellence in Production Design for a Commercial	Excellence in Production Design for a Music Video or Webseries
The Lord of the Rings: The Rings of Power: "Title Announcement" – Brian Branstetter; American Horror Stories: "Dollhouse Promo" – Marc Benacerraf; Bud Light Seltzer: "Land of Loud Flavors" – François Audouy; Just Eat & Katy Perry: "Did Somebody Say" – François Audouy; Paramount+: "Wildlife Promo" – Maia Javan	Adele: "I Drink Wine" – Liam Moore; Coldplay x Selena Gomez: "Let Somebody Go" – François Audouy; Kendrick Lamar: "Rich Spirit" – Scott Falconer; Taylor Swift: "Anti-Hero" – Ethan Tobman; Taylor Swift: "Bejeweled" – Ethan Tobman

=== Cinematic Imagery Award ===
- Baz Luhrmann and Catherine Martin

=== Hall of Fame ===
- Natacha Rambova and Terence Marsh (posthumous)

=== Lifetime Achievement Award ===
- Lilly Kilvert
- Luis G. Hoyos
- Janet Kusnick
- Michael Denering

=== William Cameron Menzies Award ===
- Guillermo del Toro
