= Saturn Award for Best Production Design =

Annual US film award

- Awarded for: Best production design of the year for a genre film
- Country: United States
- Presented by: Academy of Science Fiction, Fantasy and Horror Films
- First award: 2009
- Currently held by: Jille Azis and Kasra Farahani for The Fantastic Four: First Steps (2024/2025)
- Website: www.saturnawards.org

The Saturn Award for Best Production Design is one of the annual awards given by the American professional organization, the Academy of Science Fiction, Fantasy and Horror Films. The Saturn Awards, which are the oldest film-specialized awards to reward science fiction, fantasy, and horror achievements (the Hugo Award for Best Dramatic Presentation, awarded by the World Science Fiction Society who reward science fiction and fantasy in various media, is the oldest award for science fiction and fantasy films), included the Best Production Design category for the first time for the 2009 film year.

== Winners and nominees ==
=== 2000s ===
| Year | Production designer(s) | Film |
|---|---|---|
| 2009 (36th) | Rick Carter and Robert Stromberg | Avatar |
| 2009 (36th) | Scott Chambliss | Star Trek |
| 2009 (36th) | Stuart Craig | Harry Potter and the Half-Blood Prince |
| 2009 (36th) | Sarah Greenwood | Sherlock Holmes |
| 2009 (36th) | Philip Ivey | District 9 |
| 2009 (36th) | Alex McDowell | Watchmen |

=== 2010s ===
| Year | Production designer(s) | Film |
|---|---|---|
| 2010 (37th) | Darren Gilford | Tron: Legacy |
| 2010 (37th) | Kathy Altieri | How to Train Your Dragon |
| 2010 (37th) | Guy Hendrix Dyas | Inception |
| 2010 (37th) | Dante Ferretti | Shutter Island |
| 2010 (37th) | Rick Heinrichs | The Wolfman |
| 2010 (37th) | Robert Stromberg | Alice in Wonderland |
| 2011 (38th) | Dante Ferretti | Hugo |
| 2011 (38th) | Stuart Craig | Harry Potter and the Deathly Hallows – Part 2 |
| 2011 (38th) | Tom Foden | Immortals |
| 2011 (38th) | Rick Heinrichs | Captain America: The First Avenger |
| 2011 (38th) | Kim Sinclair | The Adventures of Tintin |
| 2011 (38th) | Bo Welch | Thor |
| 2012 (39th) | Dan Hennah | The Hobbit: An Unexpected Journey |
| 2012 (39th) | Hugh Bateup and Uli Hanisch | Cloud Atlas |
| 2012 (39th) | Sarah Greenwood | Anna Karenina |
| 2012 (39th) | David Gropman | Life of Pi |
| 2012 (39th) | Rick Heinrichs | Dark Shadows |
| 2012 (39th) | Eve Stewart | Les Misérables |
| 2013 (40th) | Dan Hennah | The Hobbit: The Desolation of Smaug |
| 2013 (40th) | Philip Messina | The Hunger Games: Catching Fire |
| 2013 (40th) | Andrew Neskoromny and Carol Spier | Pacific Rim |
| 2013 (40th) | Andy Nicholson | Gravity |
| 2013 (40th) | Jan Roelfs | 47 Ronin |
| 2013 (40th) | Robert Stromberg | Oz the Great and Powerful |
| 2014 (41st) | Nathan Crowley | Interstellar |
| 2014 (41st) | James Chinlund | Dawn of the Planet of the Apes |
| 2014 (41st) | Dennis Gassner | Into the Woods |
| 2014 (41st) | Adam Stockhausen | The Grand Budapest Hotel |
| 2014 (41st) | Peter Wenham | Captain America: The Winter Soldier |
| 2014 (41st) | Charles Wood | Guardians of the Galaxy |
| 2015 (42nd) | Thomas E. Sanders | Crimson Peak |
| 2015 (42nd) | Rick Carter and Darren Gilford | Star Wars: The Force Awakens |
| 2015 (42nd) | Scott Chambliss | Tomorrowland |
| 2015 (42nd) | Sabu Cyril | Baahubali: The Beginning |
| 2015 (42nd) | Colin Gibson | Mad Max: Fury Road |
| 2015 (42nd) | Ed Verreaux | Jurassic World |
| 2016 (43rd) | Rick Carter and Robert Stromberg | The BFG |
| 2016 (43rd) | Doug Chiang and Neil Lamont | Rogue One: A Star Wars Story |
| 2016 (43rd) | Stuart Craig | Fantastic Beasts and Where to Find Them |
| 2016 (43rd) | Guy Hendrix Dyas | Passengers |
| 2016 (43rd) | Owen Paterson | Captain America: Civil War |
| 2016 (43rd) | Charles Wood | Doctor Strange |
| 2017 (44th) | Hannah Beachler | Black Panther |
| 2017 (44th) | Paul Denham Austerberry | The Shape of Water |
| 2017 (44th) | Dennis Gassner | Blade Runner 2049 |
| 2017 (44th) | Sarah Greenwood | Beauty and the Beast |
| 2017 (44th) | Rick Heinrichs | Star Wars: The Last Jedi |
| 2017 (44th) | Hugues Tissandier | Valerian and the City of a Thousand Planets |
| 2018/2019 (45th) | Charles Wood | Avengers: Endgame |
| 2018/2019 (45th) | Bill Brzeski | Aquaman |
| 2018/2019 (45th) | Ruth De Jong | Us |
| 2018/2019 (45th) | Horace Ma Gwong-Wing | Shadow |
| 2018/2019 (45th) | Rick Heinrichs | Dumbo |
| 2018/2019 (45th) | Gemma Jackson | Aladdin |
| 2018/2019 (45th) | John Myhre | Mary Poppins Returns |
| 2019/2020 (46th) | Barbara Ling | Once Upon a Time in Hollywood |
| 2019/2020 (46th) | Rick Carter and Kevin Jenkins | Star Wars: The Rise of Skywalker |
| 2019/2020 (46th) | Nathan Crowley | Tenet |
| 2019/2020 (46th) | Mark Friedberg | Joker |
| 2019/2020 (46th) | Patrick Tatopoulos | Maleficent: Mistress of Evil |
| 2019/2020 (46th) | Ra Vincent | Jojo Rabbit |

=== 2020s ===
| Year | Production designer(s) | Film |
|---|---|---|
| 2021/2022 (50th) | Tamara Deverell | Nightmare Alley |
| 2021/2022 (50th) | Sue Chan | Shang-Chi and the Legend of the Ten Rings |
| 2021/2022 (50th) | James Chinlund | The Batman |
| 2021/2022 (50th) | Fiona Crombie | Cruella |
| 2021/2022 (50th) | Jason Kisvarday | Everything Everywhere All at Once |
| 2021/2022 (50th) | Marcus Rowland | Last Night in Soho |
| 2021/2022 (50th) | Patrice Vermette | Dune |
| 2022/2023 (51st) | Sarah Greenwood | Barbie |
| 2022/2023 (51st) | Dylan Cole and Ben Procter | Avatar: The Way of Water |
| 2022/2023 (51st) | Beth Mickie | Guardians of the Galaxy Vol. 3 |
| 2022/2023 (51st) | Kevin Kavanaugh | John Wick: Chapter 4 |
| 2022/2023 (51st) | Ruth De Jong | Oppenheimer |
| 2022/2023 (51st) | Alec Hammond | Renfield |
| 2023/2024 (52nd) | Patrice Vermette | Dune: Part Two |
| 2023/2024 (52nd) | Naaman Marshall | Alien: Romulus |
| 2023/2024 (52nd) | Mark Scruton | Beetlejuice Beetlejuice |
| 2023/2024 (52nd) | Ray Chan | Deadpool & Wolverine |
| 2023/2024 (52nd) | Daniel T. Dorrance | Kingdom of the Planet of the Apes |
| 2023/2024 (52nd) | Danny Vermette | Longlegs |
| 2024/2025 (53rd) | Jille Azis and Kasra Farahani | The Fantastic Four: First Steps |
| 2024/2025 (53rd) | Dylan Cole and Ben Procter | Avatar: Fire and Ash |
| 2024/2025 (53rd) | Tamara Deverell and Shane Vieau | Frankenstein |
| 2024/2025 (53rd) | Hannah Beachler and Monique Champagne | Sinners |
| 2024/2025 (53rd) | Beth Mickle | Superman |
| 2024/2025 (53rd) | Nathan Crowley and Lee Sandales | Wicked: For Good |

== Multiple nominations ==
5 nominations

- Rick Heinrichs

4 nominations

- Rick Carter
- Sarah Greenwood
- Robert Stromberg

3 nominations

- Stuart Craig
- Charles Wood

2 nominations

- Scott Chambliss
- James Chinlund
- Nathan Crowley
- Guy Hendrix Dyas
- Dante Ferretti
- Dennis Gassner
- Darren Gilford
- Dan Hennah

== Multiple wins ==
2 wins

- Rick Carter
- Dan Hennah
- Robert Stromberg
