= List of accolades received by The Batman (film) =

The Batman accolades
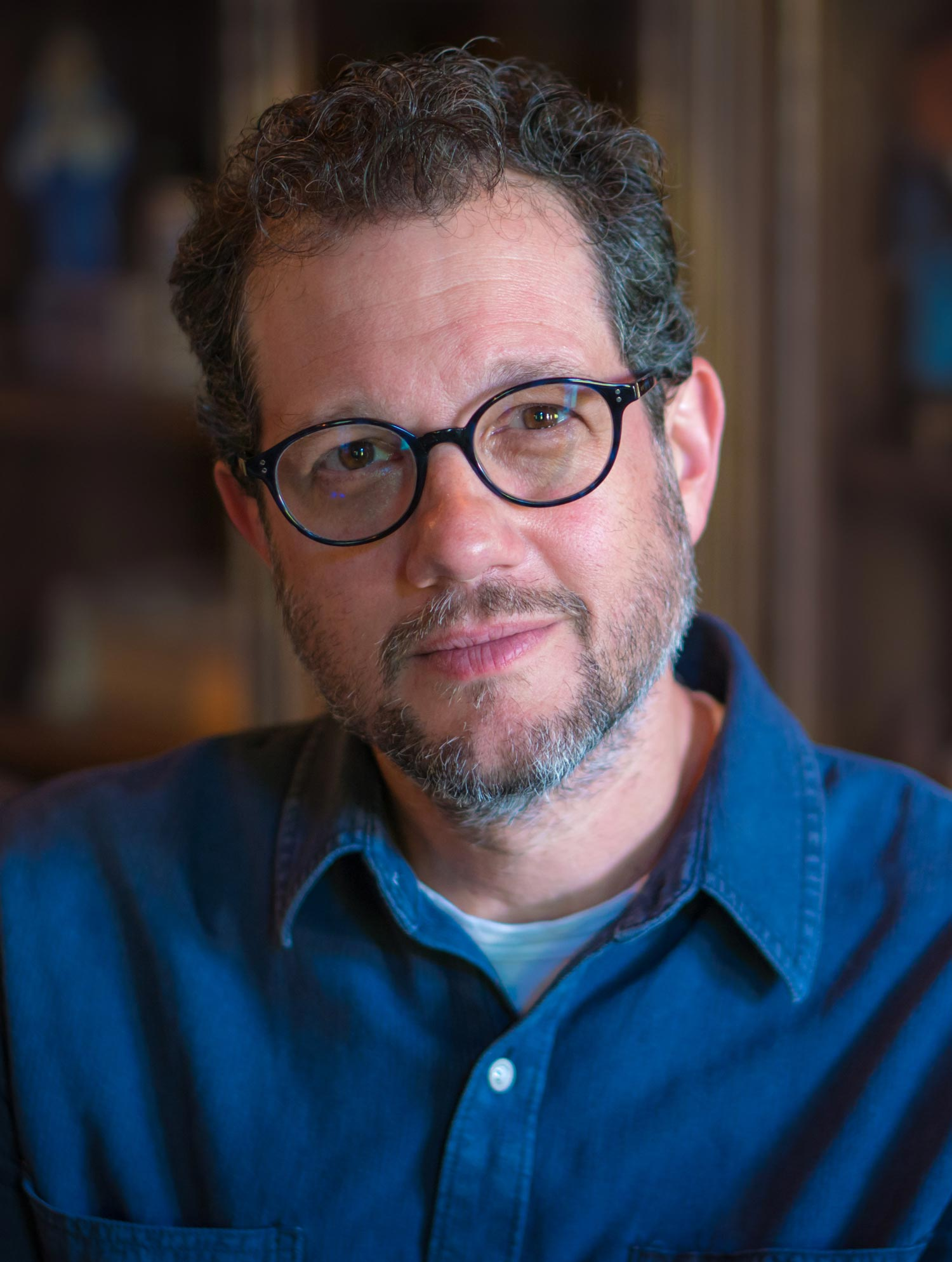
- Composer Michael Giacchino received multiple accolades for his work on the film.
Awards and nominations
Award	Wins	Nominations
Academy Awards	0	3
American Society of Cinematographers Awards	0	1
Art Directors Guild Awards	0	1
Artios Awards	0	1
Austin Film Critics Association Awards	0	1
Black Reel Awards	0	1
British Academy Film Awards	0	4
Chicago Film Critics Association Awards	0	1
Cinema Audio Society Awards	0	1
Critics' Choice Movie Awards	0	3
Critics' Choice Super Awards	2	6
Dallas–Fort Worth Film Critics Association Awards	1	1
Georgia Film Critics Association Awards	2	2
Golden Reel Awards	0	2
Golden Trailer Awards	0	6
Grammy Awards	0	1
Hollywood Critics Association Creative Arts Awards	0	6
Hollywood Critics Association Midseason Film Awards	0	6
Hollywood Music in Media Awards	0	1
Hollywood Professional Association Awards	1	3
Houston Film Critics Society Awards	0	2
London Film Critics' Circle Awards	0	1
Make-Up Artists and Hair Stylists Guild Awards	0	3
MTV Movie & TV Awards	0	4
Online Film Critics Society Awards	0	1
People's Choice Awards	0	3
Satellite Awards	0	1
Saturn Awards	2	12
Screen Actors Guild Awards	0	1
Set Decorators Society of America Awards	0	1
Society of Composers & Lyricists Awards	0	1
St. Louis Film Critics Association Awards	2	2
Visual Effects Society Awards	0	3
Washington D.C. Area Film Critics Association Awards	1	1

Totals (Note: Certain award groups do not simply award one winner. They acknowledge several different recipients, have runners-up, and have third place. Since this is a specific recognition and is different from losing an award, runner-up mentions are considered wins in this award tally. For simplification and to avoid errors, each award in this list has been presumed to have had a prior nomination.)
- Wins: 11
- Nominations: 87

The Batman is a 2022 American superhero film based on the DC Comics character Batman. Directed by Matt Reeves from a screenplay he wrote with Peter Craig, it is a reboot of the Batman film franchise produced by DC Films. Robert Pattinson stars as Bruce Wayne / Batman alongside Zoë Kravitz, Paul Dano, Jeffrey Wright, John Turturro, Peter Sarsgaard, Andy Serkis, and Colin Farrell. The film sees Batman, in his second year fighting crime in Gotham City, uncover corruption with ties to his own family while pursuing the Riddler (Dano), a mysterious serial killer targeting the city's elite.

The Batman premiered at the Lincoln Center in Manhattan on March 1, 2022, and was theatrically released on March 4. Produced on a budget of $185–200 million, The Batman grossed $770.9 million, finishing its theatrical run as the seventh-highest-grossing film of 2022. On the review aggregator website Rotten Tomatoes, the film holds an approval rating of 85% based on 526 reviews.

The Batman garnered awards and nominations in various categories with particular recognition for its acting, make-up, musical score, production design, and visual effects. It received three nominations at the 95th Academy Awards, including Best Visual Effects. At the 76th British Academy Film Awards, the film was nominated for Best Cinematography, Best Production Design, Best Makeup and Hair, and Best Special Visual Effects. It received three nominations at the 28th Critics' Choice Awards. Composer Michael Giacchino received a nomination for Best Score Soundtrack for Visual Media at the Grammy Awards' 65th ceremony. The film won two of twelve nominations at the 50th Anniversary Saturn Awards.

== Accolades ==
Accolades received by The Batman (film)
Award	Date of ceremony	Category	Recipient(s)	Result	Ref.
Academy Awards	March 12, 2023	Best Sound	Stuart Wilson, William Files, Douglas Murray, and Andy Nelson	Nominated	
Academy Awards	March 12, 2023	Best Makeup and Hairstyling	Naomi Donne, Mike Marino, and Mike Fontaine	Nominated	
Academy Awards	March 12, 2023	Best Visual Effects	Dan Lemmon, Russell Earl, Anders Langlands, and Dominic Tuohy	Nominated	
American Society of Cinematographers Awards	March 5, 2023	Outstanding Achievement in Cinematography in Theatrical Releases	Greig Fraser	Nominated	
Art Directors Guild Awards	February 18, 2023	Excellence in Production Design for a Fantasy Film	James Chinlund	Nominated	
Artios Awards	March 9, 2023	The Zeitgeist Award	Cindy Tolan, Lucy Bevan, Nicholas Petrovich, and Olivia Grant	Nominated	
Austin Film Critics Association Awards	January 10, 2023	Best Score	Michael Giacchino	Nominated	
Black Reel Awards	February 6, 2023	Outstanding Supporting Actor	Jeffrey Wright	Nominated	
British Academy Film Awards	February 19, 2023	Best Cinematography	Greig Fraser	Nominated	
British Academy Film Awards	February 19, 2023	Best Production Design	James Chinlund and Lee Sandales	Nominated	
British Academy Film Awards	February 19, 2023	Best Makeup and Hair	Naomi Donne, Mike Marino, and Zoe Tahir	Nominated	
British Academy Film Awards	February 19, 2023	Best Special Visual Effects	Russell Earl, Dan Lemmon, Anders Langlands, and Dominic Tuohy	Nominated	
Chicago Film Critics Association Awards	December 14, 2022	Best Original Score	Michael Giacchino	Nominated	
Cinema Audio Society Awards	March 4, 2023	Outstanding Achievement in Sound Mixing for a Motion Picture – Live Action	Stuart Wilson, Andy Nelson, William Files, Kirsty Whalley, Ryan D. Young, and Darrin Mann	Nominated	
Critics' Choice Movie Awards	January 15, 2023	Best Score	Michael Giacchino	Nominated	
Critics' Choice Movie Awards	January 15, 2023	Best Hair and Makeup	The Batman	Nominated	
Critics' Choice Movie Awards	January 15, 2023	Best Visual Effects	The Batman	Nominated	
Critics' Choice Super Awards	March 16, 2023	Best Superhero Movie	The Batman	Won	
Critics' Choice Super Awards	March 16, 2023	Best Actor in a Superhero Movie	Paul Dano	Nominated	
Critics' Choice Super Awards	March 16, 2023	Best Actor in a Superhero Movie	Colin Farrell	Won	
Critics' Choice Super Awards	March 16, 2023	Best Actor in a Superhero Movie	Robert Pattinson	Nominated	
Critics' Choice Super Awards	March 16, 2023	Best Actress in a Superhero Movie	Zoë Kravitz	Nominated	
Critics' Choice Super Awards	March 16, 2023	Best Villain in a Movie	Paul Dano	Nominated	
Dallas–Fort Worth Film Critics Association Awards	December 19, 2022	Best Cinematography	Greig Fraser	Runner-up	
Georgia Film Critics Association Awards	January 13, 2023	Best Original Score	Michael Giacchino	Won	
Georgia Film Critics Association Awards	January 13, 2023	Best Cinematography	Greig Fraser	Runner-up	
Golden Reel Awards	February 26, 2023	Outstanding Achievement in Sound Editing – Feature Dialogue / ADR	Douglas Murray, William Files, Jacob Riehle, Bobbi Banks, and David V. Butler	Nominated	
Golden Reel Awards	February 26, 2023	Outstanding Achievement in Sound Editing – Feature Effects / Foley	Will Files, Douglas Murray, Chris Terhune, Lee Gilmore, Craig Henighan, Diego Perez, and Phil Barrie	Nominated	
Golden Trailer Awards	July 22, 2021	Best Teaser	"Justice" (Statement Advertising)	Nominated	
Golden Trailer Awards	July 22, 2021	Best Motion/Title Graphics	"Justice Trailer Title Animation" (Devastudios, Inc.)	Nominated	
Golden Trailer Awards	July 22, 2021	Best Sound Editing	"Justice" (Statement Advertising)	Nominated	
Golden Trailer Awards	October 6, 2022	Best Action	The Batman (BOND)	Nominated	
Golden Trailer Awards	October 6, 2022	Best International Poster	The Batman (WORKS ADV)	Nominated	
Golden Trailer Awards	October 6, 2022	Best BTS/EPK for a Feature Film (Under 2 minutes)	"Becoming Catwoman" (SunnyBoy Entertainment)	Nominated	
Grammy Awards	February 5, 2023	Best Score Soundtrack for Visual Media	Michael Giacchino	Nominated	
Hollywood Critics Association Creative Arts Awards	February 24, 2023	Best Cinematography	Greig Fraser	Nominated	
Hollywood Critics Association Creative Arts Awards	February 24, 2023	Best Makeup and Hairstyling	Naomi Donne, Mike Marino, and Zoe Tahir	Nominated	
Hollywood Critics Association Creative Arts Awards	February 24, 2023	Best Production Design	James Chinlund and Lee Sandales	Nominated	
Hollywood Critics Association Creative Arts Awards	February 24, 2023	Best Score	Michael Giacchino	Nominated	
Hollywood Critics Association Creative Arts Awards	February 24, 2023	Best Sound	Stuart Wilson, William Files, Douglas Murray, and Andy Nelson	Nominated	
Hollywood Critics Association Creative Arts Awards	February 24, 2023	Best Stunts	The Batman	Nominated	
Hollywood Critics Association Midseason Film Awards	July 1, 2022	Best Picture	The Batman	Nominated	
Hollywood Critics Association Midseason Film Awards	July 1, 2022	Best Director	Matt Reeves	Nominated	
Hollywood Critics Association Midseason Film Awards	July 1, 2022	Best Supporting Actor	Colin Farrell	Nominated	
Hollywood Critics Association Midseason Film Awards	July 1, 2022	Best Supporting Actor	Paul Dano	Nominated	
Hollywood Critics Association Midseason Film Awards	July 1, 2022	Best Supporting Actress	Zoë Kravitz	Nominated	
Hollywood Critics Association Midseason Film Awards	July 1, 2022	Best Screenplay	Matt Reeves and Peter Craig	Nominated	
Hollywood Music in Media Awards	November 16, 2022	Best Original Score in a Sci-Fi Film	Michael Giacchino (Note: Also for Spider-Man: No Way Home (2021) and Thor: Love and Thunder (2022))	Nominated	
Hollywood Professional Association Awards	November 17, 2022	Outstanding Color Grading – Feature Film	David Cole (FotoKem) (Note: Also for Dune (2021))	Won	
Hollywood Professional Association Awards	November 17, 2022	Outstanding Sound – Feature Film	William Files, Douglas Murray, Lee Gilmore, and Chris Terhune (Pacific Standard Sound)	Nominated	
Hollywood Professional Association Awards	November 17, 2022	Outstanding Visual Effects – Feature Film	Dan Lemmon, Russell Earl, Anthony Smith, Malcolm Humphreys, and Michael James Allen (Industrial Light & Magic)	Nominated	
Houston Film Critics Society Awards	February 18, 2023	Best Visual Effects	The Batman	Nominated	
Houston Film Critics Society Awards	February 18, 2023	Best Stunt Coordination Team	The Batman	Nominated	
London Film Critics' Circle Awards	February 5, 2023	British/Irish Actor of the Year (for body of work)	Colin Farrell	Nominated	
Make-Up Artists and Hair Stylists Guild Awards	February 11, 2023	Best Contemporary Make-Up in a Feature-Length Motion Picture	Naomi Donne, Doone Forsyth, Norma Webb, and Jemma Carballo	Nominated	
Make-Up Artists and Hair Stylists Guild Awards	February 11, 2023	Best Special Make-Up Effects in a Feature-Length Motion Picture	Michael Marino, Mike Fontaine, Yoichi Art Sakamoto, and Göran Lundström	Nominated	
Make-Up Artists and Hair Stylists Guild Awards	February 11, 2023	Best Contemporary Hair Styling in a Feature-Length Motion Picture	Zoe Tahir, Melissa Van Tongeren, Paula Price, and Andrea Lance Jones	Nominated	
MTV Movie & TV Awards	June 5, 2022	Best Movie	The Batman	Nominated	
MTV Movie & TV Awards	June 5, 2022	Best Performance in a Movie	Robert Pattinson	Nominated	
MTV Movie & TV Awards	June 5, 2022	Best Villain	Colin Farrell	Nominated	
MTV Movie & TV Awards	June 5, 2022	Best Kiss	Robert Pattinson and Zoë Kravitz	Nominated	
Online Film Critics Society Awards	January 23, 2023	Best Original Score	Michael Giacchino	Nominated	
People's Choice Awards	December 6, 2022	Movie of 2022	The Batman	Nominated	
People's Choice Awards	December 6, 2022	Action Movie of 2022	The Batman	Nominated	
People's Choice Awards	December 6, 2022	Action Movie Star of 2022	Zoë Kravitz	Nominated	
Satellite Awards	March 3, 2023	Best Visual Effects	Dan Lemmon, Russell Earl, Anders Langlands, and Dominic Tuohy	Nominated	
Saturn Awards	October 25, 2022	Best Superhero Film	The Batman	Nominated	
Saturn Awards	October 25, 2022	Best Actor in a Film	Robert Pattinson	Nominated	
Saturn Awards	October 25, 2022	Best Actress in a Film	Zoë Kravitz	Nominated	
Saturn Awards	October 25, 2022	Best Supporting Actor in a Film	Paul Dano	Nominated	
Saturn Awards	October 25, 2022	Best Supporting Actor in a Film	Colin Farrell	Nominated	
Saturn Awards	October 25, 2022	Best Film Direction	Matt Reeves	Won	
Saturn Awards	October 25, 2022	Best Film Writing (Screenplay)	Matt Reeves and Peter Craig	Nominated	
Saturn Awards	October 25, 2022	Best Film Music (Composing)	Michael Giacchino	Nominated	
Saturn Awards	October 25, 2022	Best Film Editing	William Hoy and Tyler Nelson	Nominated	
Saturn Awards	October 25, 2022	Best Film Production Designer	James Chinlund	Nominated	
Saturn Awards	October 25, 2022	Best Film Costume	Jacqueline Durran, David Crossman, and Glyn Dillon	Won	
Saturn Awards	October 25, 2022	Best Film Make-up	Mike Marino and Naomi Donne	Nominated	
Screen Actors Guild Awards	February 26, 2023	Outstanding Performance by a Stunt Ensemble in a Motion Picture	The Batman	Nominated	
Set Decorators Society of America Awards	February 14, 2023	Best Achievement in Decor/Design of a Science Fiction or Fantasy Feature Film	Lee Sandales and James Chinlund	Nominated	
Society of Composers & Lyricists Awards	February 15, 2023	Outstanding Original Score for a Studio Film	Michael Giacchino	Nominated	
St. Louis Gateway Film Critics Association Awards	December 18, 2022	Best Score	Michael Giacchino	Runner-up	
St. Louis Gateway Film Critics Association Awards	December 18, 2022	Best Cinematography	Greig Fraser	Runner-up	
Visual Effects Society Awards	February 15, 2023	Outstanding Visual Effects in a Photoreal Feature	Dan Lemmon, Bryan Searing, Russell Earl, Anders Langlands, and Dominic Tuohy	Nominated	
Visual Effects Society Awards	February 15, 2023	Outstanding Virtual Cinematography in a CG Project	Dennis Yoo, Michael J. Hall, Jason Desjarlais, and Ben Bigiel	Nominated	
Visual Effects Society Awards	February 15, 2023	Outstanding Compositing & Lighting in a Feature	Beck Veitch, Stephen Tong, Eva Snyder, and Rachel E. Herbert	Nominated	
Washington D.C. Area Film Critics Association Awards	December 12, 2022	Best Original Score	Michael Giacchino	Won	
