= Art Directors Guild Awards 2017 =

Annual US film and television awards ceremony

22nd Art Directors Guild Awards
- Date: January 27, 2018

The 22nd Art Directors Guild Excellence in Production Design Awards, took place on January 27, 2018, at the Hollywood & Highland Center Ray Dolby Ballroom in Hollywood, honoring the best production designers of 2017. Nominations were announced on January 4.

== Winners and nominees ==
=== Film ===
Period Film:

- Paul Denham Austerberry – The Shape of Water
  - Sarah Greenwood – Darkest Hour
  - Nathan Crowley – Dunkirk
  - Jim Clay – Murder on the Orient Express
  - Rick Carter – The Post

Fantasy Film:

- Dennis Gassner – Blade Runner 2049
  - Sarah Greenwood – Beauty and the Beast
  - Rick Heinrichs – Star Wars: The Last Jedi
  - James Chinlund – War for the Planet of the Apes
  - Aline Bonetto – Wonder Woman

Contemporary Film:

- François Audouy – Logan
  - Stefania Cella – Downsizing
  - Rusty Smith – Get Out
  - Chris Jones – Lady Bird
  - Inbal Weinberg – Three Billboards Outside Ebbing, Missouri

Animated Film:

- Harley Jessup – Coco
  - William Cone and Jay Shuster – Cars 3
  - Olivier Adam – Despicable Me 3
  - Grant Freckelton – The Lego Batman Movie
  - Matthew Button – Loving Vincent

=== Television ===
One-Hour Period or Fantasy Single-Camera Television Series:

- Deborah Riley – Game of Thrones (for "Dragonstone", "The Queen's Justice", "Eastwatch")
  - Bo Welch – A Series of Unfortunate Events (for "The Bad Beginning: Part One", "The Reptile Room: Part One", "The Wide Window: Part One")
  - Martin Childs – The Crown (for "A Company of Men", "Beryl", "Dear Mrs. Kennedy")
  - Steve Arnold – Mindhunter (for "Episode 1", "Episode 4", "Episode 9")
  - Chris Trujillo – Stranger Things (for "Chapter Six: The Spy", "Chapter Eight: The Mind Flayer", "Chapter Nine: The Gate")

One-Hour Contemporary Single-Camera Television Series:

- Julie Berghoff – The Handmaid's Tale (for "Offred", "Birth Day", "Nolite Te Bastardes Carborundorum")
  - Patti Podesta – American Gods (for "The Bone Orchard", "The Secret of Spoons", "Head Full of Snow")
  - Andrew Stearn – The Handmaid's Tale (for "The Bridge")
  - Anastasia White – Mr. Robot (for "eps3.0_power-saver-mode.h", "eps3.1_undo.gz", "eps3.2_legacy.so")
  - Ruth De Jong – Twin Peaks (for "Part 1", "Part 8", "Part 15")

Half Hour Single-Camera Television Series:

- Todd Fjelsted – GLOW (for "Pilot", "The Wrath of Kuntar", "The Dusty Spur")
  - Jessica Kender – Future Man (for "Pandora’s Mailbox", "Beyond the Truffledome", "A Date with Destiny")
  - Amy Williams – Master of None (for "Le Nozze", "Thanksgiving", "Amarsi Un Po")
  - Richard Toyon – Silicon Valley (for "Hooli-con", "Server Error")
  - Jim Gloster – Veep (for "Omaha")

Multi-Camera Series:

- Glenda Rovello – Will & Grace (for "11 Years Later", "A Gay Olde Christmas")
  - Stephan Olson – 9JKL (for "Pilot", "Lovers Getaway", "Set Visit")
  - John Shaffner – The Big Bang Theory (for "The Romance Recalibration", "The Separation Agitation", "The Explosion Implosion")
  - John Shaffner – The Ranch (for "Last Dollar (Fly Away)", "Wrapped up in You")
  - Stephan Olson – Superior Donuts (for "Pilot", "Crime Time", "Arthur’s Day Off")

Television Movie or Limited Series:

- Joel Collins – Black Mirror (for "USS Callister")
  - Jeff Mossa – American Horror Story: Cult (for "Election Night", "Winter of Our Discontent")
  - John Paino – Big Little Lies (for "Somebody's Dead", "Living the Dream", "You Get What You Need")
  - Elisabeth Williams – Fargo (for "The Narrow Escape Problem", "The Law of Inevitability", "Who Rules the Land of Denial?")
  - Judy Becker – Feud: Bette and Joan (for "Pilot", "And the Winner Is…", "You Mean All This Time We Could Have Been Friends?")

Variety or Competition Series/Awards or Event Special:

- Schuyler Telleen – Portlandia (for "Portland Secedes", "Ants", "Fred’s Cell Phone Company")
  - Brian Stonestreet – 74th Golden Globe Awards
  - James Pearse Connelly – Bill Nye Saves the World (for "Earth Is a Hot Mess")
  - Keith Raywood, Eugene Lee, Akira Yoshimura and N. Joseph DeTullio – Saturday Night Live (for "Aziz Ansari/Big Sean", "Alec Baldwin/Ed Sheeran", "Larry David/Miley Cyrus")
  - Bruce Rodgers – Super Bowl Halftime Show Starring Lady Gaga

Short Format: Web Series, Music Video or Commercial:

- Jason Edmonds – Star Wars Battlefront II: "Rivalry / PS4"
  - James Chinlund – Apple: "Bulbs"
  - Shane Valentino – Chanel: Gabrielle"
  - Natalie Groce – Katy Perry: "Bon Appétit"
  - Ruth De Jong – Nike: "Equality"
