= François Audouy =

French-American movie production designer

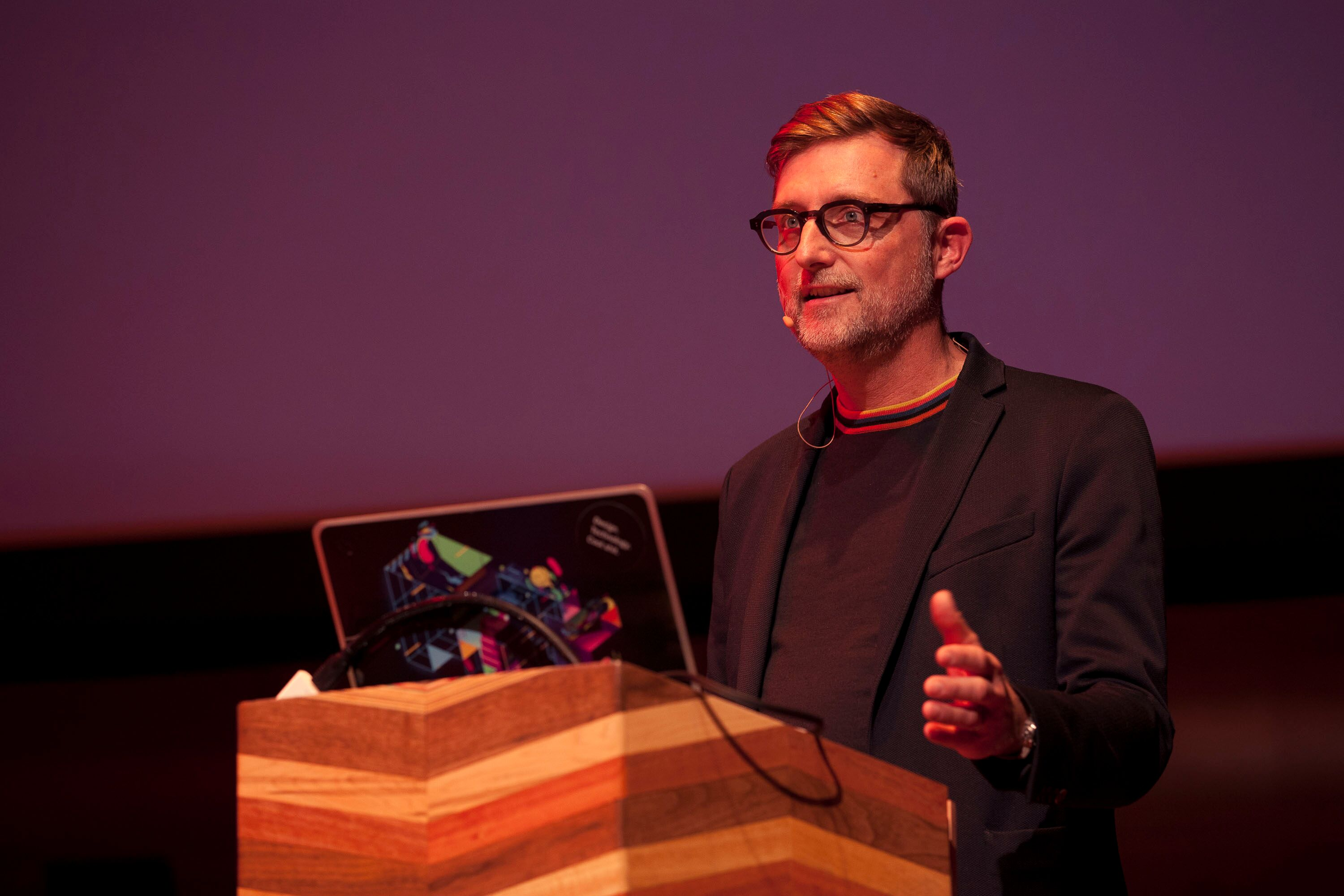
- Audouy speaking at the 2019 Camp conference in Calgary, Alberta, Canada
- Born: June 17, 1974 (age 52); Toulouse, France
- Occupation: Production Designer
- Years active: 2002–present
- Spouse: Véronique Audouy (m. 1998)
- Children: 2, Charlotte and Chloé
- Website: www.audouy.com

François Audouy (French: [odwi]; born June 17, 1974) is a French-American production designer known for his work in feature films, television, and music videos. He is a frequent collaborator with director James Mangold, having designed Logan (2017), Ford v Ferrari (2019), and A Complete Unknown (2024), among others. Audouy has received five Art Directors Guild awards and two Primetime Emmy Award nominations for his work in production design.

== Early life ==
Audouy was born in Toulouse, France and raised in the United States. He developed an early interest in film design and visual storytelling, later pursuing a career in production design.

== Career ==
Audouy began his career in the art department of major motion pictures as a graphic designer and concept artist. He gained industry recognition as an art director before transitioning to production design. His work is noted for its historical accuracy, immersive environments, and innovative approach to set construction. In addition to his work in film, Audouy has designed commercials and music videos.

His first television series, The Residence, is set in an alternate historical timeline and features a fictional President of the United States. The production design of the series was noted for the "dollhouse shots" and scope of reconstruction of the White House executive mansion, and earned Audouy his first Primetime Emmy Award for Outstanding Production Design for a Narrative Contemporary Program (One Hour or More). In 2025, Audouy was announced as the production designer for the third season of American psychological drama television series Euphoria, written and directed by Sam Levinson. The season marked his second television project. Audouy designed the season's expanded visual world, which moved beyond the show's suburban high school setting to locations including the Mexico–United States border, drawing influences from the American Western and classic Hollywood filmmaking. He was nominated for a second Primetime Emmy Award for his work on the series' final season.

== Filmography ==
=== Film ===
| Year | Title | Role | Director |
|---|---|---|---|
| 2002 | Spider-Man | Assistant art director | Sam Raimi |
| 2002 | Men in Black II | Assistant art director | Barry Sonnenfeld |
| 2003 | The Cat in the Hat | Assistant art director | Bo Welch |
| 2004 | The Terminal | Supervising graphic designer | Steven Spielberg |
| 2005 | Charlie and the Chocolate Factory | Art director | Tim Burton |
| 2007 | Transformers | Art director | Michael Bay |
| 2007 | Lions for Lambs | Supervising art director | Robert Redford |
| 2009 | Watchmen | Supervising art director | Zack Snyder |
| 2011 | Green Lantern | Supervising art director | Martin Campbell |
| 2012 | Abraham Lincoln: Vampire Hunter | Production designer | Timur Bekmambetov |
| 2013 | The Wolverine | Production designer | James Mangold |
| 2014 | Dracula Untold | Production designer | Gary Shore |
| 2017 | Logan | Production designer | James Mangold |
| 2019 | Ford v Ferrari | Production designer | James Mangold |
| 2021 | Ghostbusters: Afterlife | Production designer | Jason Reitman |
| 2023 | Air | Production designer | Ben Affleck |
| 2024 | A Complete Unknown | Production designer | James Mangold |
| TBA | Tyrant | Production designer | David Weil |

=== Television ===
| Year | Title | Role | Director(s) |
|---|---|---|---|
| 2025 | The Residence | Production designer | Liza Johnson, Jaffar Mahmood |
| 2026 | Euphoria | Production designer | Sam Levinson |

== Accolades ==
=== Creative Arts Emmy Awards ===
| Year | Work | Episode submission | Category | Result | Ref |
|---|---|---|---|---|---|
| 2025 | The Residence | "The Fall of the House of Usher" | Outstanding Production Design for a Narrative Contemporary Program (One Hour or More) | Nominated | |
| 2026 | Euphoria | "This Little Piggy" | Outstanding Production Design for a Narrative Contemporary Program (One Hour or More) | Nominated | |

=== ADG Excellence in Production Design Awards ===
| Year | Work | Category | Result | Ref |
|---|---|---|---|---|
| 2006 | Charlie and the Chocolate Factory | Excellence in Production Design for a Period or Fantasy Film | Nominated | |
| 2018 | Logan | Excellence in Production Design for a Feature Film | Won | |
| 2020 | Ford v Ferrari | Excellence in Production Design for a Feature Film | Nominated | |
| 2021 | "Falling" by Harry Styles | Excellence in Production Design for a Music Video | Won | |
| 2021 | "My Oh My" by Camila Cabello | Excellence in Production Design for a Music Video | Nominated | |
| 2022 | "Shivers" by Ed Sheeran | Excellence in Production Design for a Music Video | Nominated | |
| 2022 | "All I Know So Far" by Pink | Excellence in Production Design for a Music Video | Nominated | |
| 2022 | "My Universe" by Coldplay and BTS | Excellence in Production Design for a Music Video | Nominated | |
| 2022 | Ghostbusters: Afterlife | Excellence in Production Design for a Fantasy Film | Nominated | |
| 2022 | "Happier Than Ever" by Billie Eilish (Apple Music) | Excellence in Production Design for a Commercial | Won | |
| 2022 | Made to Change (Neom) | Excellence in Production Design for a Commercial | Nominated | |
| 2023 | Did Somebody Say (Just Eat) | Excellence in Production Design for a Commercial | Nominated | |
| 2023 | Seltzer: Land of Loud Flavors (Bud Lite) | Excellence in Production Design for a Commercial | Nominated | |
| 2024 | Scary Fast (MacBook Pro) | Excellence in Production Design for a Commercial | Won | |
| 2025 | Plates (Apple Pay) | Excellence in Production Design for a Commercial | Won | |
| 2025 | A Complete Unknown | Excellence in Production Design for a Feature Film | Nominated | |

=== Satellite Awards ===
| Year | Work | Category | Result | Ref |
|---|---|---|---|---|
| 2019 | Ford v Ferrari | Best Art Direction and Production Design | Nominated | |

=== Set Decorators Society of America Awards ===
| Year | Work | Set Decoration | Category | Result | Ref |
|---|---|---|---|---|---|
| 2025 | A Complete Unknown | Regina Graves | Best Achievement in Decor/Design of a Period Feature Film | Won | |
| 2025 | A Complete Unknown | Regina Graves | Best Picture | Won | |
| 2026 | Euphoria | Anthony Carlino | Best Achievement in Decor/Design of a One Hour Contemporary Series | Nominated | |
