= Art Directors Guild Awards 2023 =

Annual US film and television awards ceremony

28th Art Directors Guild Awards
- Date: February 10, 2024

The 28th Art Directors Guild Excellence in Production Design Awards, honoring the best production designers in film, television and media of 2023, took place on February 10, 2024, at the Ray Dolby Ballroom in Ovation Hollywood, California. The nominations were announced on January 9, 2024. Max Greenfield hosted the ceremony.

== Winners and nominees ==
=== Film ===
Excellence in Production Design for a Contemporary Film	Excellence in Production Design for a Period Film
Saltburn – Suzie Davies; Beau Is Afraid – Fiona Crombie; John Wick: Chapter 4 – Kevin Kavanaugh; The Killer – Donald Graham Burt; Mission: Impossible – Dead Reckoning Part One – Gary Freeman	Oppenheimer – Ruth De Jong; Asteroid City – Adam Stockhausen; Killers of the Flower Moon – Jack Fisk; Maestro – Kevin Thompson; Napoleon – Arthur Max
Excellence in Production Design for a Fantasy Film	Excellence in Production Design for an Animated Film
Poor Things – James Price and Shona Heath; Barbie – Sarah Greenwood; The Creator – James Clyne; Guardians of the Galaxy Vol. 3 – Beth Mickle; Wonka – Nathan Crowley	Spider-Man: Across the Spider-Verse – Patrick O'Keefe; The Boy and the Heron – Yôji Takeshige; Elemental – Don Shank; The Super Mario Bros. Movie – Guillaume Aretos; Teenage Mutant Ninja Turtles: Mutant Mayhem – Yashar Kassai

=== Television ===
Excellence in Production Design for a One-Hour Contemporary Single-Camera Series	Excellence in Production Design for a One-Hour Period Single-Camera Series
Succession (Episode: "America Decides") – Stephen Carter (HBO); Fargo (Episode: "Trials and Tribulations") – Trevor Smith (FX); The Morning Show (Episodes: "The Kármán Line", "Ghost in the Machine", "Love Island") – Nelson Coates (Apple TV+); Poker Face (Episode: "Escape from Shit Mountain") – Judy Rhee (Peacock); Yellowjackets (Episode: "Digestif") – Margot Ready (Showtime)	The Great (Episodes: "You the People", "Fun", "Peter and the Wolf") – Francesca di Mottola (Hulu); The Crown (Episode: "Sleep, Dearie Sleep") – Martin Childs (Netflix); The Gilded Age (Episodes: "His Grace the Duke", "Close Enough to Touch", "Warning Shots") – Bob Shaw (HBO); The Marvelous Mrs. Maisel (Episode: "Susan") – Bill Groom (Prime Video); Perry Mason (Episode: "Chapter Eleven") – Keith Cunningham (HBO)
Excellence in Production Design for a One-Hour Fantasy Single-Camera Series	Excellence in Production Design for a Half Hour Single-Camera Television Series
The Last of Us (Episode: "Infected") – John Paino (HBO); For All Mankind (Episode: "The Bear Hug") – Seth Reed (Apple TV+); Loki (Episode: "Ouroboros") – Kasra Farahani (Disney+); The Mandalorian (Episode: "Chapter 23: The Spies") – Doug Chiang and Andrew L. Jones (Disney+); Silo (Episode: "Machines") – Gavin Bocquet (Apple TV)	Reservation Dogs (Episode: "Deer Lady") – Brandon Tonner-Connolly (FX / Hulu); The Bear (Episode: "Omelette") – Merje Veski (FX / Hulu); Only Murders in the Building (Episodes: "Sitzprobe", "Opening Night") – Patrick Howe (Hulu); Our Flag Means Death (Episodes: "Impossible Birds", "Red Flags", "Man on Fire") – Ra Vincent (Max); What We Do in the Shadows (Episode: "A Weekend at Morrigan Manor") – Shayne Fox (FX)
Excellence in Production Design for a Multi-Camera Series	Excellence in Production Design for a Television Movie or Limited Series
Frasier (Episode: "Moving In") – Glenda Rovello (Paramount+); Bob Hearts Abishola (Episode: "Twerk O' Clock") – Francoise Cherry-Cohen (CBS); Bunk'd (Episode: "The Glitching Hour") – Kelly Hogan (Disney Channel); The Conners (Episode: "Road Trip and Guilt Trip") – Jerry Dunn (ABC); That '90s Show (Episode: "Free Leia") – Greg J. Grande (Netflix)	Beef – Grace Yun (Netflix); All the Light We Cannot See – Simon Elliott (Netflix); Daisy Jones & the Six – Jessica Kender (Prime Video); Lessons in Chemistry – Cat Smith (Apple TV+); A Murder at the End of the World – Alex DiGerlando (FX / Hulu)
Excellence in Production Design for a Variety Special	Excellence in Production Design for a Variety, Reality, or Competition Series
80th Golden Globe Awards – Brian Stonestreet (NBC); 76th Annual Tony Awards – Steve Bass (CBS); Dave Chappelle: The Dreamer – Bruce Ryan (Netflix); Hannah Waddingham: Home for Christmas – Misty Buckley (Apple TV+); The Weeknd: Live at Sofi Stadium – Es Devlin (Max)	Squid Game: The Challenge (Episode: "War") – Mathieu Weekes and Benjamin Norman (Netflix); A Black Lady Sketch Show (Episodes: "I'm Clapping From My Puss", "What Kind of Medicine Does Dr. King Practice?", "Peek-A-Boob, Your Titty's Out") – Cindy Chao and Michele Yu (HBO); History of the World, Part II (Episode: "VIII") – Monica Sotto (Hulu); RuPaul's Drag Race (Episode: "Blame it on the Edit") – Gianna Costa (MTV); Saturday Night Live (Episodes: "Jenna Ortega/The 1975", "Nate Bargatze/Foo Fighters") – Keith Ian Raywood, Akira Yoshimura, and N. Joseph DeTullio (NBC)

=== Short Form ===
Excellence in Production Design for a Commercial	Excellence in Production Design for a Music Video or Webseries
Apple: The New Macbook Pro: "Scary Fast" – François Audouy (TIE); Booking.com: "Somewhere, Anywhere, The Musical" – Florencia Martin (TIE); Dom Pérignon: "Lady Gaga – The Labor of Creation" – Dylan Kahn; Giorgio Armani: "Armani Si" – Annie Beauchamp; M&M's: "Ma&Ya's" – Natalie Groce	Taylor Swift: "I Can See You" – Ethan Tobman; Apple: "The Underdogs: Swiped Mac" – Jason Hougaard; boygenius: "the film" – Jen Dunlap; Lana Del Rey featuring Jon Batiste: "Candy Necklace" – Brandon Mendez; Miley Cyrus: "River" – Kurt Gefke

=== Cinematic Imagery Award ===
- Mimi Leder

=== Hall of Fame ===
- Lawrence G. Paull (posthumous)

=== Lifetime Achievement Award ===
- Greg Papalia
- David Lowery
- Francine West
- Wynn P. Thomas
