= Art Directors Guild Award for Excellence in Production Design for a Period or Fantasy Film =

The Art Directors Guild Award for Excellence in Production Design for a Period or Fantasy Film was an annual award given by the Art Directors Guild between 2000 and 2005.

In 2006, the award was split into two separate categories: Excellence in Production Design for a Period Film and Excellence in Production Design for a Fantasy Film

== Winners and nominees ==
Year	Film	Production Designer(s)
2000	Gladiator	Arthur Max
2000	The Cell	Tom Foden
2000	Crouching Tiger, Hidden Dragon	Tim Yip
2000	Dr. Seuss' How the Grinch Stole Christmas	Michael Corenblith
2000	The Patriot	Kirk M. Petruccelli
2001	Moulin Rouge!	Catherine Martin
2001	A.I. Artificial Intelligence	Rick Carter
2001	Harry Potter and the Sorcerer's Stone	Stuart Craig
2001	The Lord of the Rings: The Fellowship of the Ring	Grant Major
2001	The Man Who Wasn't There	Dennis Gassner
2002	The Lord of the Rings: The Two Towers	Grant Major
2002	Chicago	John Myhre
2002	Gangs of New York	Dante Ferretti
2002	Minority Report	Alex McDowell
2002	Road to Perdition	Dennis Gassner
2003	The Lord of the Rings: The Return of the King	Grant Major
2003	Girl with a Pearl Earring	Ben Van Os
2003	The Last Samurai	Lilly Kilvert
2003	Pirates of the Caribbean: The Curse of the Black Pearl	Brian Morris
2003	Seabiscuit	Jeannine Oppewall
2004	Lemony Snicket's A Series of Unfortunate Events	Rick Heinrichs
2004	The Aviator	Dante Ferretti
2004	Finding Neverland	Gemma Jackson
2004	The Incredibles	Lou Romano
2004	The Phantom of the Opera	Anthony Pratt
2005	Memoirs of a Geisha	John Myhre
2005	Batman Begins	Nathan Crowley
2005	Charlie and the Chocolate Factory	Alex McDowell
2005	Good Night, and Good Luck	James D. Bissell
2005	King Kong	Grant Major
