= Chinlund =

Chinlund is a surname. Notable people with the surname include:

- James Chinlund (born 1971), American production designer
- Nick Chinlund (born 1961), American actor and voice actor
