= Kim Sinclair =

New Zealand set designer

- Born: 10 July 1954 (age 71); Auckland, New Zealand
- Occupation: Art director
- Years active: 1982–present
- Website: http://www.kimsinclair.com/

Kim Sinclair (born 10 July 1954) is an Academy Award-winning art director and production designer from New Zealand. He won the Oscar during the 82nd Academy Awards for Best Art Direction for the film Avatar. He shared it with Rick Carter and Robert Stromberg.

== Selected filmography ==
- Slow West (2015)
- The Dark Horse (2014)
- Man of Steel (2013)
- The Adventures of Tintin (2011)
- Avatar (2009)
- Black Sheep (2006)
- The Legend of Zorro (2005)
- The Last Samurai (2003)
- Beyond Borders (2003)
- Cast Away (2000)
