= Art Directors Guild Award for Excellence in Production Design for an Animated Film =

Film award

The Art Directors Guild Award for Excellence in Production Design for an Animated Film is one of the annual awards given by the Art Directors Guild starting from 2017.

== Winners and nominees ==
=== 2010s ===
Year	Film	Production Designer(s)
2017	Coco	Harley Jessup
2017	Cars 3	William Cone and Jay Shuster
2017	Despicable Me 3	Olivier Adam
2017	The Lego Batman Movie	Grant Freckelton
2017	Loving Vincent	Matthew Button
2018	Isle of Dogs	Adam Stockhausen and Paul Harrod
2018	Dr. Seuss' The Grinch	Colin Stimpson
2018	Incredibles 2	Ralph Eggleston
2018	Ralph Breaks the Internet	Cory Loftis
2018	Spider-Man: Into the Spider-Verse	Justin K. Thompson
2019	Toy Story 4	Bob Pauley
2019	Abominable	Max Boas
2019	Frozen 2	Michael Giaimo
2019	How to Train Your Dragon: The Hidden World	Pierre-Olivier Vincent
2019	The Lion King	James Chinlund

=== 2020s ===
Year	Film	Production Designer(s)
2020	Soul	Steve Pilcher
2020	The Croods: A New Age	Nate Wragg
2020	A Shaun the Sheep Movie: Farmageddon	Matt Perry
2020	Onward	Noah Klocek
2020	Wolfwalkers	Ross Stewart, Tomm Moore and Maria Pareja
2021	Encanto	Ian Gooding and Lorelay Bové
2021	Luca	Daniela Strijleva
2021	The Mitchells vs. the Machines	Lindsey Olivares
2021	Raya and the Last Dragon	Paul Felix, Mingjue Helen Chen and Cory Loftis
2021	Sing 2	Olivier Adam
2022	Guillermo del Toro's Pinocchio	Guy Davis and Curt Enderle
2022	Lightyear	Tim Evatt
2022	Marcel the Shell with Shoes On	Liz Toonkel
2022	Puss in Boots: The Last Wish	Nate Wragg
2022	Turning Red	Rona Liu
2023	Spider-Man: Across the Spider-Verse	Patrick O'Keefe
2023	The Boy and the Heron	Yôji Takeshige
2023	Elemental	Don Shank
2023	The Super Mario Bros. Movie	Guillaume Aretos
2023	Teenage Mutant Ninja Turtles: Mutant Mayhem	Yashar Kassai
2024	The Wild Robot	Raymond Zibach
2024	Flow	Gints Zilbalodis
2024	Inside Out 2	Jason Deamer
2024	Moana 2	Ian Gooding
2024	Wallace & Gromit: Vengeance Most Fowl	Matt Perry
