= Robert Stromberg =

American film director

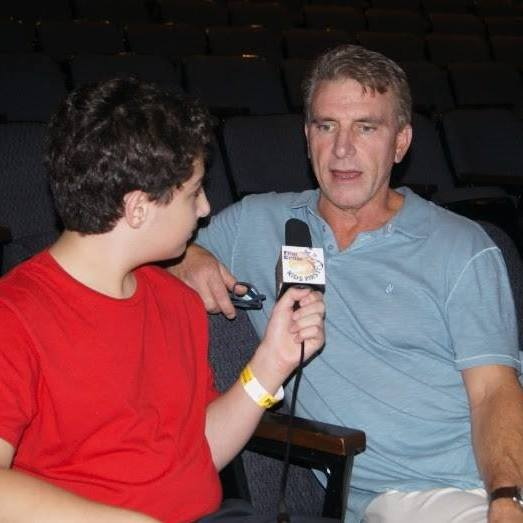
- Stromberg in 2015
- Occupations: Special effects artist, Production designer, Film director
- Years active: 1987–present
- Notable work: Avatar, Alice in Wonderland, Maleficent
- Awards: 2 Academy Awards; 5 Emmy Awards
- Website: https://www.robertstromberg.com

Robert Stromberg is an American special effects artist, production designer, filmmaker, and film director. He is best known for his work on Avatar (2009) and Alice in Wonderland (2010), for which he won consecutive Academy Awards, and for directing Disney's Maleficent (2014).

== Early life and education ==
Stromberg grew up in Carlsbad, California. He attended Carlsbad High School in Carlsbad, California. As a child he pursued drawing and painting, training under a former Disney illustrator who had moved to his community.

== Career ==
His credits include films such as James Cameron's Avatar, Tim Burton's Alice in Wonderland, and Sam Raimi's Oz the Great and Powerful.

He made his directorial debut with the 2014 Disney film Maleficent, a re-imagining of the iconic Disney villain.

=== Matte painting and visual effects ===
Stromberg began his career as a matte painter and visual effects artist, contributing to series such as Star Trek: The Next Generation and Star Trek: Voyager.

=== Production design ===
Stromberg served as production designer on James Cameron's Avatar (2009), which earned him an Academy Award alongside Rick Carter and Kim Sinclair. He followed with another Academy Award win for Tim Burton’s Alice in Wonderland (2010).

== Filmography ==
=== Director ===
Film

- Maleficent (2014)

Television

Year	Title	Notes
2015	What Lives Inside	Branded miniseries
2019	Project Blue Book	2 episodes (Also executive producer)

=== Visual effects ===
Film

Year	Title	Notes
2003	Master and Commander: The Far Side of the World	Oscar nominee

Television

Year	Title	Notes
1990s	Star Trek: The Next Generation	Won Emmy Award; Also matte painter
1995	Star Trek: Voyager	Won Emmy Award
2008	John Adams	Won Primetime Emmy Award
2011–2012	Boardwalk Empire	Won 2 Primetime Emmy Awards

=== Production designer ===
Year	Title	Notes
2009	Avatar	Won Academy Award for Best Production Design
2010	Alice in Wonderland	Won Academy Award
2013	Oz the Great and Powerful	
2016	The BFG	
