= Art Directors Guild Award for Excellence in Production Design for a Feature Film =

Discontinued ADG film award

The Art Directors Guild Award for Excellence in Production Design for a Feature Film was an annual award given by the Art Directors Guild between 1996 and 1999.

Since 2000, this award has been separated into different categories, including Contemporary Film, Fantasy Film, and Period Film.

== Winners and nominees ==
=== 1990s ===
Year	Film	Production Designer(s)
1996	The English Patient	Stuart Craig
1996	The Birdcage	Bo Welch
1996	The Crucible	Lilly Kilvert
1996	Hamlet	Tim Harvey
1996	Mars Attacks!	Wynn Thomas
1997	Titanic	Peter Lamont
1997	Amistad	Rick Carter
1997	Gattaca	Jan Roelfs
1997	L.A. Confidential	Jeannine Oppewall
1997	Men in Black	Bo Welch
1998	What Dreams May Come	Eugenio Zanetti
1998	Elizabeth	John Myhre
1998	Pleasantville	Jeannine Oppewall
1998	Saving Private Ryan	Thomas E. Sanders
1998	Shakespeare in Love	Martin Childs
1999	Sleepy Hollow	Rick Heinrichs
1999	American Beauty	Naomi Shohan
1999	Anna and the King	Luciana Arrighi
1999	The Matrix	Owen Paterson
1999	Titus	Dante Ferretti
