= Ruth De Jong =

American art director and production designer

- Born: San Bernardino, California, U.S.
- Education: Texas Christian University (BFA)
- Occupations: Production designer, art director
- Spouse: Charlie Skinner

Ruth De Jong is an American production designer and art director. She is known for her long creative partnership with production designer Jack Fisk, and for her work on films directed by Paul Thomas Anderson, Terrence Malick, and Jordan Peele. She was nominated for an Academy Award in the category Best Production Design for the film Oppenheimer. She was also nominated for a Primetime Emmy Award for her work on Twin Peaks.

== Early life and education ==
De Jong was born in San Bernardino, California, and moved to Charlottesville, Virginia at age 12. She attended Texas Christian University (TCU) in Fort Worth, Texas, where she played on the women's soccer team and earned a Bachelor of Fine Arts in painting and photography in 2004. She also worked as a freelance photographer for the Fort Worth Star-Telegram during her time at TCU. After graduating, she was accepted to the Pennsylvania Academy of the Fine Arts for graduate study in painting but deferred enrollment to work in film, ultimately not attending.

== Career ==
De Jong's entry into film came through production designer Jack Fisk, the husband of actress Sissy Spacek and father of De Jong's childhood friend Schuyler Fisk. Fisk recruited her to assist him on Paul Thomas Anderson's There Will Be Blood (2007). She worked her way up through the art department before making her debut as a production designer on Kenneth Lonergan's Manchester by the Sea (2016).

David Lynch recommended De Jong to design the 2017 continuation of Twin Peaks after Fisk was unavailable; the project earned her an Primetime Emmy Award nomination. She subsequently designed Jordan Peele's Us (2019) and Nope (2022), and Christopher Nolan's Oppenheimer (2023), for which she received both an Academy Award nomination and the ADG Award for Excellence in Production Design for a Period Film. She reteamed with Nolan for The Odyssey (2026).

Outside of film, De Jong co-founded De Jong & Co., a furniture and interior design firm, with her brothers Peter and Philip.

== Personal life ==
De Jong is married to location manager Charlie Skinner, whom she met on a commercial shoot in 2014. They have a daughter, Sadie, born in 2019, and own a ranch in Livingston, Montana as well as a loft in Downtown Los Angeles.

== Filmography ==
=== As production designer ===
- Swedish Auto (2006)
- Familiar Strangers (2008)
- Dead Man's Burden (2012)
- Manchester by the Sea (2016)
- Twin Peaks (2017, TV)
- Yellowstone (2018, TV)
- Us (2019)
- Nope (2022)
- Oppenheimer (2023)
- The Odyssey (2026)

=== As art director ===
- The Future (2011)
- Inherent Vice (2014)
- Knight of Cups (2015)
- Song to Song (2017)

=== As assistant art director ===
- Water for Elephants (2011)
- The Master (2012)
- To the Wonder (2012)

=== Other film credits ===
- I'm Reed Fish (2006) — set dresser
- There Will Be Blood (2007) — production assistant
- The Tree of Life (2011) — art department coordinator

== Selected awards and nominations ==
In 2024, Jong received the Art Directors Guild Award for Excellence in Production Design for a Period Film award at the 28th Annual Art Directors Guild Awards.
