= Ben Procter (production designer) =

American art director and production designer

- Education: University of California, Los Angeles
- Occupations: Production designer; art director; concept artist
- Years active: 2000–present
- Known for: Avatar film series

Ben Procter is an American art director and production designer. He is best known for his work on the Avatar film series, serving as a concept art director on the first film (2009) and as the co-production designer for Avatar: The Way of Water (2022) and Avatar: Fire and Ash (2025). For The Way of Water, he received a nomination for the Academy Award for Best Production Design at the 95th Academy Awards.

== Early life and education ==
Procter attended the University of California, Los Angeles (UCLA), where he graduated with a degree in fine arts. He struggled to find work as a concept artist immediately following graduation, but his portfolio of traditional paintings eventually landed him an internship in the matte painting department at Industrial Light & Magic (ILM).

== Career ==
Procter worked in the video game industry for several years before transitioning into film. He moved to Hollywood in 2001 and established himself as a lead robot illustrator for Transformers (2007) and an art director on its sequels, Transformers: Revenge of the Fallen (2009) and Transformers: Dark of the Moon (2011).

In 2010, Procter served as an art director for Tron: Legacy. He secured his first credit as a lead production designer on the film Ender's Game (2013), where he was responsible for visualizing the film's interface technology and environments.

Procter's long-standing collaboration with director James Cameron began with the first Avatar film, where he worked as a concept art director focusing on the mechanical elements of the human technology. He returned to the franchise as a co-production designer alongside Dylan Cole for Avatar: The Way of Water, and Avatar: Fire and Ash, tasked with designing the human "hard surface" assets (such as human bases, space craft and vehicles) in contrast to Cole's focus on the organic world of Pandora.

== Filmography ==
=== Film ===
Year	Title	Role	Notes
2006	Superman Returns	Concept artist	
2007	Transformers	Lead robot illustrator	
2009	Avatar	Concept art director	
2009	Transformers: Revenge of the Fallen	Art director	
2010	Tron: Legacy	Art director	
2011	Transformers: Dark of the Moon	Art director	
2012	Prometheus	Art director	
2013	Ender's Game	Production designer	
2014	Transformers: Age of Extinction	Art director	
2022	Avatar: The Way of Water	Production designer	Co-nominated with Dylan Cole and Vanessa Cole for the Academy Award for Best Production Design
2025	Avatar: Fire and Ash	Production designer	
