= The Batman (film) =

2022 superhero film by Matt Reeves

- Theatrical release poster
- Directed by: Matt Reeves
- Written by: Matt Reeves; Peter Craig
- Based on: Characters from DC
- Produced by: Dylan Clark; Matt Reeves
- Starring: Robert Pattinson; Zoë Kravitz; Paul Dano; Jeffrey Wright; John Turturro; Peter Sarsgaard; Andy Serkis; Colin Farrell
- Cinematography: Greig Fraser
- Edited by: William Hoy; Tyler Nelson
- Music by: Michael Giacchino
- Production companies: Warner Bros. Pictures; DC Films; 6th & Idaho; Dylan Clark Productions
- Distributed by: Warner Bros. Pictures
- Release dates: March 1, 2022 (Lincoln Center); March 4, 2022 (United States)
- Running time: 176 minutes
- Country: United States
- Language: English
- Budget: $185–200 million
- Box office: $772.3 million

The Batman is a 2022 American superhero film directed by Matt Reeves from a screenplay he wrote with Peter Craig. Based on the DC Comics character Batman, it is a reboot of the Batman film franchise. Robert Pattinson stars as Bruce Wayne / Batman alongside Zoë Kravitz, Paul Dano, Jeffrey Wright, John Turturro, Peter Sarsgaard, Andy Serkis, and Colin Farrell. The film follows Batman, in his second year fighting crime in Gotham City, as he uncovers corruption with ties to his own family while pursuing the Riddler (Dano), a mysterious serial killer and terrorist targeting the city's elite. Warner Bros. Pictures distributed the film, which Reeves and Dylan Clark produced for DC Films.

A Batman film for the DC Extended Universe (DCEU) franchise was announced in October 2014, with Ben Affleck starring as the titular character. He signed on to also direct, produce, and co-write The Batman by 2016, but had reservations about the project and stepped down in January 2017. Reeves took over the following month and reworked the story, removing the DCEU connections to focus on a younger version of the character earlier in his vigilante career compared to Affleck's portrayal. Reeves worked on the script with Craig and Mattson Tomlin, and sought to explore Batman's detective aspects more than previous films, drawing inspiration from the films of Alfred Hitchcock and the New Hollywood era, and comics such as "Year One" (1987), The Long Halloween (1996–97), and Ego (2000).

Following Affleck's departure as the star in January 2019, Pattinson was cast in May, and additional actors joined later that year. Filming took place from January 2020 to March 2021 and was halted for several months due to the COVID-19 pandemic. The production occurred throughout the United Kingdom, with location shooting in England and Scotland, as well as on soundstages at Warner Bros. Studios Leavesden. Cinematographer Greig Fraser shot the film with Industrial Light & Magic's StageCraft virtual production technology, while Michael Giacchino composed the musical score. The film has over 1,500 visual effects shots and is one of the longest superhero films ever made. The Batman used an extensive viral marketing campaign during and after production.

After facing multiple delays caused by the COVID-19 pandemic, The Batman was theatrically released in the United States on March 4, 2022, three days after premiering at Lincoln Center in New York City. The film received positive reviews from critics, with praise for Reeves's approach, the performances of Pattinson and Kravitz, and the cinematography and score, although the tone, runtime, and third act received some criticism. Batman's depiction and characterization prompted critical analysis from several commentators, as did themes exploring class conflict and inequality. It was a commercial success, grossing over $772 million worldwide against a $185–200 million budget, making it the seventh-highest-grossing film of 2022 and Warner Bros.'s highest-grossing pandemic release. Its financial performance set several pandemic-era box office records, particularly for IMAX screenings. The film was nominated for three Academy Awards and received numerous other accolades. The Batman is intended to start a trilogy and a shared universe called the "Batman Epic Crime Saga". A sequel, The Batman: Part II, is scheduled for release on February 18, 2028, while a spin-off television series starring Farrell, The Penguin, debuted on HBO in late 2024.

== Plot ==
On Halloween, Gotham City mayor Don Mitchell Jr. is murdered by a masked serial killer, the Riddler. Reclusive billionaire Bruce Wayne, who has operated for two years as the vigilante Batman, investigates the murder alongside Lieutenant Jim Gordon, much to the disdain of the Gotham City Police Department (GCPD); the Riddler leaves a message for Batman at the crime scene. The following night, the Riddler kills the police commissioner, Pete Savage, and leaves another message for Batman. Batman and Gordon discover that the Riddler left a thumb drive in Mitchell's car; it contains images of Mitchell's affair with a woman, Annika Kosolov, at the Iceberg Lounge—a nightclub operated by the Penguin, crime boss Carmine Falcone's lieutenant. While questioning the Penguin, who pleads ignorance, Batman notices that Annika's roommate, Selina Kyle, works at the club as a waitress. Annika disappears; while searching for answers, Batman and Selina discover that Savage and Mitchell were on Falcone's payroll, as is district attorney Gil Colson.

The Riddler abducts Colson, straps a timed collar bomb to his neck, and sends him to interrupt Mitchell's funeral. When Batman arrives, the Riddler calls him via a phone duct-taped to Colson and threatens to detonate the bomb if Colson cannot answer three riddles. Colson refuses to answer the third—the name of the informant who gave the GCPD information that led to a historic drug bust ending mob boss Salvatore Maroni's operation—and is killed. Batman and Gordon deduce that the informant may be the Penguin and track him to a drug deal. They discover that Maroni's operation was transferred to Falcone, with many corrupt officers involved. Selina inadvertently exposes them when she arrives to steal money and discovers Annika's corpse in the trunk of a car. Batman captures the Penguin after a car chase, but he and Gordon learn that the Penguin is not the informant.

Batman and Gordon follow the Riddler's trail to the ruins of an orphanage initially funded by Bruce's deceased parents, Thomas and Martha Wayne, where they learn that the Riddler holds a grudge against the Wayne family for failing the orphanage. Bruce's butler and caretaker, Alfred Pennyworth, is hospitalized after opening a letter bomb addressed to Bruce. The Riddler leaks evidence that Thomas, who was running for mayor before he was murdered, hired Falcone to kill a journalist whom Maroni controlled and who was writing a story about Martha's family history of mental illness. Bruce confronts Alfred, who maintains that Thomas only asked Falcone to threaten the journalist into silence; upon learning that Falcone had murdered the journalist, Thomas planned to turn both himself and Falcone over to the police. Alfred suspects that Falcone had Thomas and Martha killed to silence them.

Selina reveals to Batman that Falcone is her father. After discovering that Falcone killed Annika because she learned he was the informant, Selina attempts to kill him, but Batman and Gordon arrive in time to stop her. Gordon arrests Falcone, but the Riddler kills Falcone with a sniper rifle moments later. The Riddler gives himself up and is unmasked as forensic accountant Edward Nashton; he is incarcerated in Arkham State Hospital, where he tells Batman he took inspiration from him when targeting the corrupt. Batman learns that Nashton has planted car bombs and cultivated an online following that plans to assassinate Mayor-elect Bella Reál. The bombs destroy the seawall around Gotham and flood the city. Nashton's followers attempt to kill Reál at her victory celebration in an arena, but Batman and Selina stop them. Batman saves the crowds in the flooding arena from electrocution and leads them to safety. In the aftermath, Nashton befriends another inmate, (Note: Identified off-screen as the Joker) while Selina deems Gotham beyond saving and leaves. Batman continues to aid the city's recovery efforts and vows to inspire hope in Gotham rather than exacting vengeance.

== Cast ==
- Robert Pattinson as Bruce Wayne / Batman:
  A reclusive billionaire who obsessively protects Gotham City as a masked vigilante to cope with his traumatic past. Batman is around 30 years old and not yet an experienced crime fighter. Director Matt Reeves wanted to explore the character before he becomes experienced. Reeves and Pattinson described Batman as an insomniac who cannot differentiate between the Batman persona and his "recluse rockstar" public identity as Bruce, with Reeves comparing his obsession with Batman to that of a drug addiction. Pattinson said the film questions the nature of heroism, as Batman is more flawed than traditional superheroes and unable to control himself, seeking to process his rage and inflict his perceived justice. Reeves considered The Batman a story about Batman learning that he must not exact vengeance, but inspire hope. Oscar Novak portrays a young Bruce, while Rick English was Pattinson's stunt double.
- Zoë Kravitz as Selina Kyle / Catwoman:
  A nightclub waitress, drug dealer, and cat burglar who meets Batman while searching for her missing roommate; her moral ambiguity challenges Batman's black-and-white view of good and evil. Kravitz said the character is gradually becoming a femme fatale while discovering herself and surviving. She described her as a mysterious character with unclear motivations who represents femininity in contrast to Batman's masculinity. She said the pair are partners in crime, drawn together by their desire to fight for vulnerable people. Reeves saw Selina as allowing Batman to be aware of his sheltered upbringing and change his mind regarding preconceived assumptions he had about Gotham's corruption. Kravitz focused more on Selina than her Catwoman persona because she wanted to focus on the character's emotional journey. She also interpreted Selina as bisexual, which the character is depicted as in some comics.
- Paul Dano as Edward Nashton / The Riddler:
  A forensic accountant inspired by Batman to become a serial killer. He targets the elite of Gotham and live-streams his crimes. An orphan raised in abject poverty, the Riddler resents Gotham's affluent people for ignoring the less fortunate. Nashton seeks to expose Gotham's corruption by taunting Batman and law enforcement with riddles. Reeves said Batman inspiring the Riddler reflects the idea from the comics that he creates his own enemies and that the Riddler's attack on Gotham gives the character a political agenda as a terrorist-like figure. He found the similarity between Batman and the Riddler's goals unsettling. He likened the Riddler to the Zodiac Killer for their practice of communicating with ciphers and riddles. Dano wanted his performance to balance the real-life inspirations with the Batman franchise's theatricality. Joseph Walker portrays a young Nashton. Due to citogenesis, the Riddler uses the alias "Patrick Parker".
- Jeffrey Wright as Jim Gordon:
  An ally of Batman in the Gotham City Police Department (GCPD). He is the only GCPD officer whom Batman trusts, and they work together to solve the Riddler case. Similar to director Christopher Nolan's The Dark Knight Trilogy (2005–2012), Gordon begins as a police lieutenant in The Batman, allowing his progression to police commissioner to be depicted in subsequent films. Wright felt that starting Gordon as the lieutenant enabled him to play a larger role than previous film iterations. Reeves felt that Batman and Gordon's partnership was emphasized more than in previous Batman films, and he compared them to Carl Bernstein (Dustin Hoffman) and Bob Woodward (Robert Redford) from All the President's Men (1974).
- John Turturro as Carmine Falcone:
  A Gotham crime boss who maintains substantial control over Gotham's affairs, he is the Riddler's primary target as well as Selina's father. Turturro described Falcone as dangerous, while Reeves said he appeared to be a "genteel mobster", but has a dark history, comparing him to Noah Cross (John Huston) from Chinatown (1974). The Batman implies that Falcone played a role in Batman's origin story by ordering the murder of Thomas and Martha Wayne. Falcone wears vintage sunglasses throughout the film, as Turturro felt the character needed a "mask".
- Peter Sarsgaard as Gil Colson: Gotham's district attorney, whom Sarsgaard described as untruthful and "distasteful".
- Andy Serkis as Alfred Pennyworth:
  Batman's butler and mentor, though they have a strained relationship and rarely speak. Pattinson described Alfred as Batman's only confidant, even though Alfred believes he is insane. Alfred is used to structure and order due to his military background, which is also reflected in his attire and demeanor. To illustrate Alfred's physical appearance as a military veteran, Reeves conceived the idea of him using a cane, while Serkis suggested incorporating his facial scars. Serkis said Alfred was part of the secret service before joining the Wayne Enterprises security team; his background led to him acting more as a teacher or mentor to Bruce rather than the father figure he needed during Bruce's childhood. Reeves noted that Alfred was forced into becoming Bruce's parental figure despite being inexperienced and young, and feels guilty that his flawed parenting of Bruce might have led to his obsession with Batman.
- Colin Farrell as Oz / The Penguin:
  Falcone's disfigured chief lieutenant who operates the Iceberg Lounge, the nightclub where Selina works. He is not yet the crime kingpin he is depicted as in the comics and dislikes being referred to as the Penguin. Reeves described the Penguin as a "mid-level mobster" with some showmanship who has been underestimated and desires more. Reeves compared the Penguin to Fredo Corleone (John Cazale) from The Godfather (1972) because he feels insignificant within a crime family of competent and powerful men. Farrell wore heavy prosthetics and a fat suit created by makeup artist Mike Marino, which made him look unrecognizable and took two to four hours to apply. Producer Dylan Clark said that during the production of the spin-off series The Penguin (2024), the Penguin's surname was shortened from the original comic book name, Cobblepot, to simply "Cobb" to help make the character more grounded.

Supporting cast members include: Jayme Lawson as Bella Reál, a mayoral candidate for Gotham City who Reeves said represents hope; Gil Perez-Abraham as Martinez, a GCPD officer; Peter McDonald as William Kenzie, a corrupt GCPD officer; Alex Ferns as Pete Savage, the GCPD commissioner; Con O'Neill as Mackenzie Bock, the GCPD chief; and Rupert Penry-Jones as Don Mitchell Jr., Gotham's mayor. Barry Keoghan makes a cameo appearance as the Joker, an enemy of Batman incarcerated in Arkham State Hospital; he is credited as "Unseen Arkham Prisoner". Other cast members are: twins Charlie and Max Carver as Iceberg Lounge bouncers (credited as "The Twins"); Hana Hrzic as Annika Kosolov, Selina's friend, an Iceberg Lounge waitress murdered by Falcone; Jay Lycurgo as a young gang member; Akie Kotabe as a train passenger; Sandra Dickinson as Dory, Bruce's housekeeper; and Luke Roberts and Stella Stocker as Bruce's parents, Thomas and Martha Wayne, respectively.

== Production ==
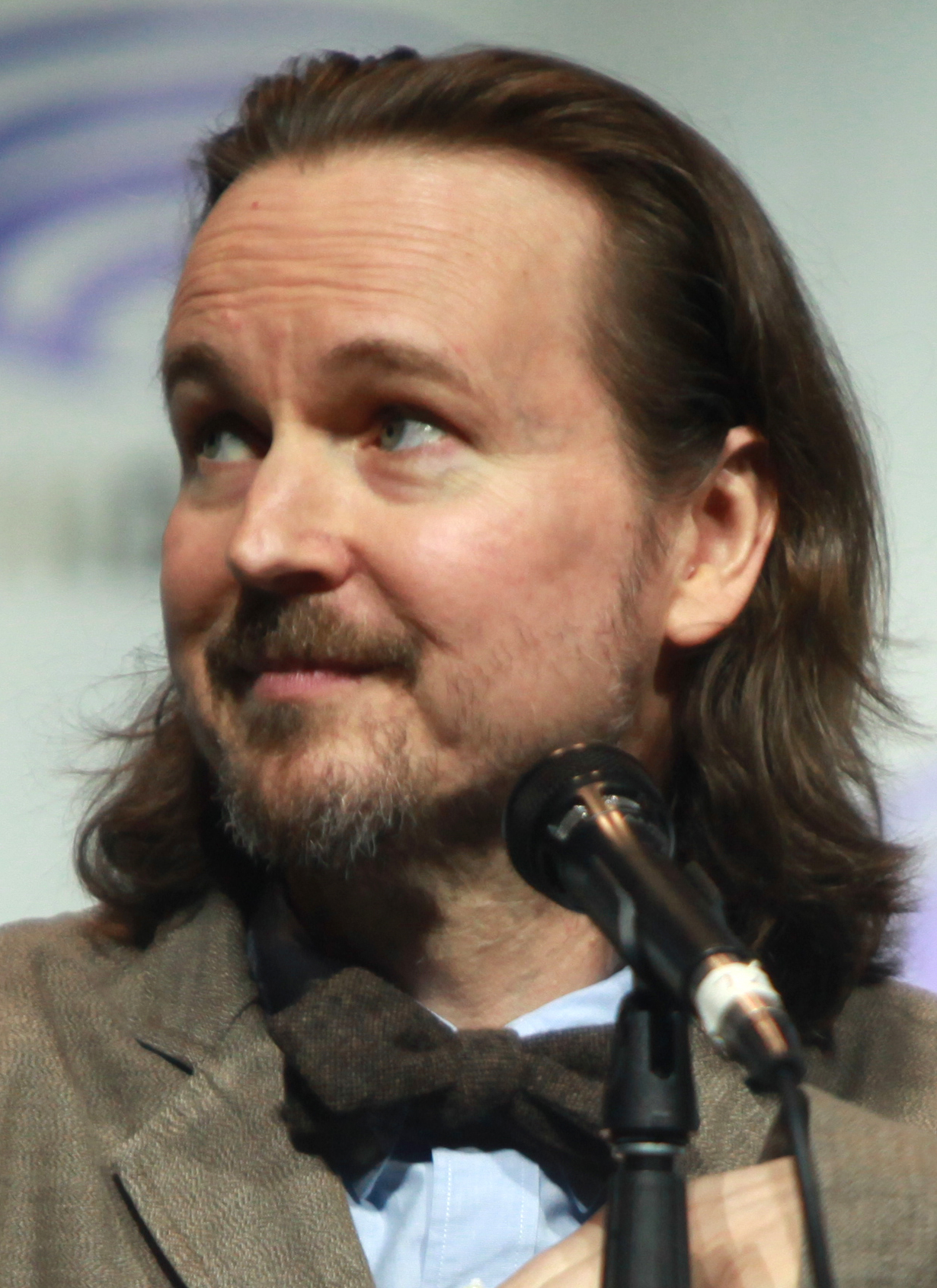
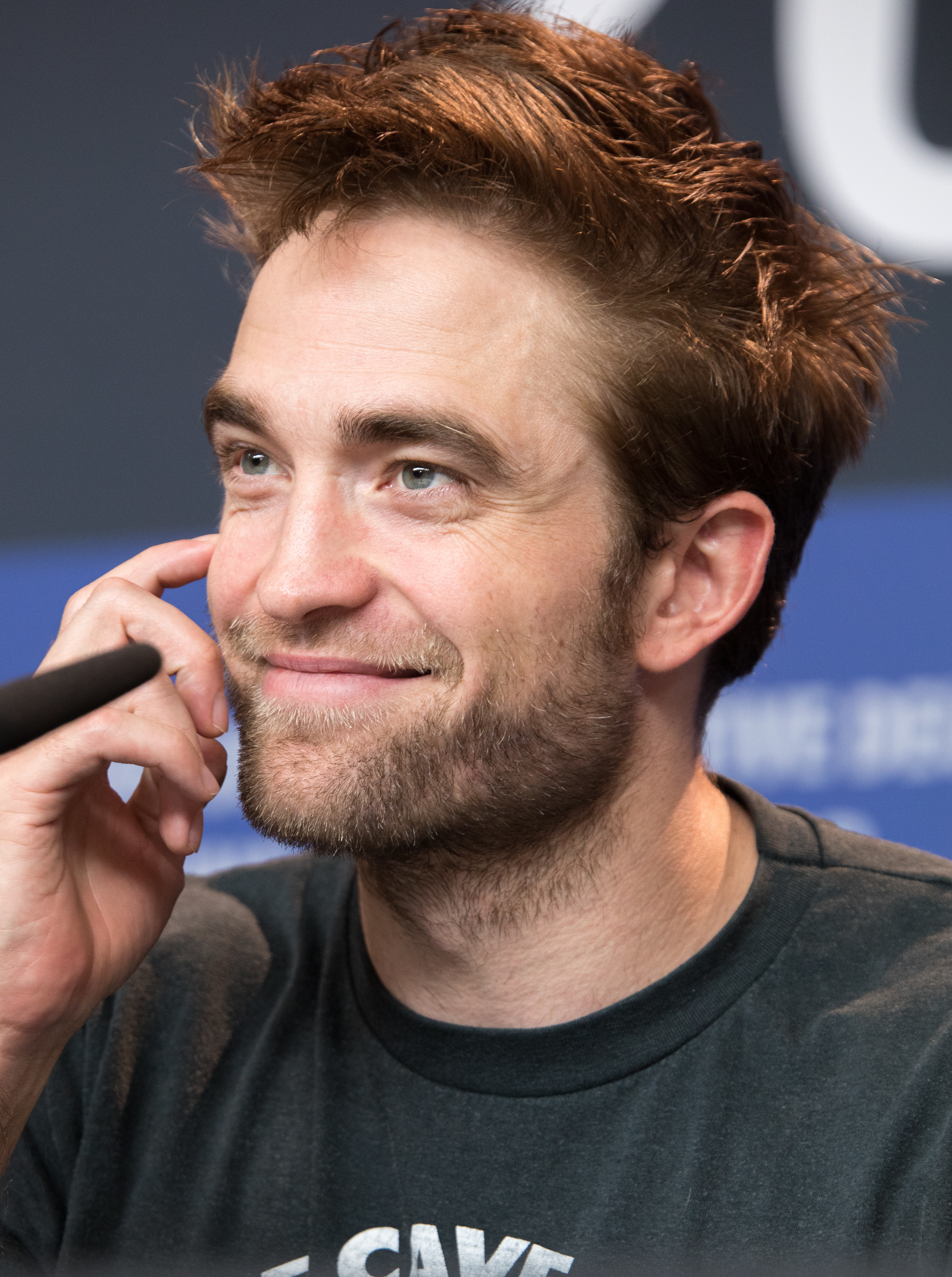
Matt Reeves took over as writer and director from Ben Affleck and focused on a younger version of the character, portrayed by Robert Pattinson.

After Ben Affleck was cast as Bruce Wayne / Batman for the DC Extended Universe (DCEU) franchise in 2013, he began developing a standalone Batman film for him to star in, which Warner Bros. Pictures announced in October 2014. Affleck was also attached to direct and co-write the script with Geoff Johns by July 2015, and they finished the first draft in March 2016. In October, Affleck revealed the film was titled The Batman. A planned sequel to the DCEU team-up film Justice League (2017) was later delayed to accommodate The Batman, but the reception to the earlier DCEU film Batman v Superman: Dawn of Justice (2016), co-starring Affleck, prompted Warner Bros. to re-evaluate its approach to the DCEU, which led to Affleck's The Batman being "sidelined". Affleck began to have reservations about directing the film, and announced his departure as director in January 2017, but he still planned to star and produce. He cited script issues and felt he would not enjoy directing it. Chris Terrio turned in a rewrite of the script at that time.

Matt Reeves, a longtime Batman fan, was hired to replace Affleck as director in February 2017. Reeves reworked the film to focus on Batman earlier in his vigilante career, emphasized the character's detective side more than previous Batman films, and separated it from the DCEU. Reeves wanted The Batman to be a noir film from Batman's perspective, and he wrote a new script with Mattson Tomlin and Peter Craig, drawing inspiration from the comic books Batman: The Long Halloween (1996–97), Dark Victory (1999–2000), "Year One" (1987), Ego (2000), and "Zero Year" (2013–14), as well as the character's earlier comic book runs. Reeves was also inspired by films from the New Hollywood era, including The French Connection (1971), Klute (1971), Chinatown (1974), All the President's Men (1976), Taxi Driver (1976), and by the films of Alfred Hitchcock.

In January 2019, Affleck confirmed that he was no longer starring due to various personal issues. Robert Pattinson was subsequently cast as Batman in May, which was subject to initial backlash from some fans, and was followed by additional castings later that year, particularly for members of Batman's rogues gallery. Reeves spent more time on fewer camera angles, a meticulous process he developed while directing the television series Felicity (1998–2002). James Chinlund was set as the production designer, while Greig Fraser served as the cinematographer, reteaming with Reeves after working on his film Let Me In (2010). The production used the StageCraft virtual production technology that Fraser helped develop for Industrial Light & Magic (ILM) on the Disney+ Star Wars series The Mandalorian (2019–2023), particularly for consistent golden hour lighting inspired by the lighting from In the Mood for Love (2000).

Principal photography began in January 2020 in London, under the working title Vengeance, and wrapped in March 2021. Around a quarter of filming was completed before production was disrupted by the COVID-19 pandemic, beginning two months after filming started. Reeves used the production shutdown to review the already-shot footage to plan for the remainder of filming and explored the film's tone, but did not rewrite the script during this time. Filming resumed in September after facing several setbacks. Location shooting also took place in Scotland, Liverpool, and Chicago, along with soundstage work at Warner Bros. Studios Leavesden. Dan Lemmon served as the visual effects supervisor, after previously collaborating with Reeves on his Planet of the Apes films. Over 1,500 visual effects shots were created between Wētā FX, ILM, Scanline VFX, and Crafty Apes. The editing process during and after filming was particularly challenging due to the pandemic, with Warner Bros. implementing strict protocols that prevented co-editors William Hoy and Tyler Nelson from directly interacting with Reeves. After initially editing from their homes during the early months of the pandemic, Hoy and Nelson used several AVID editing systems to replicate Reeves's fast-paced, collaborative editing style from isolated rooms on the Warner Bros. Studios Burbank lot throughout 2021. The Batman is the longest Batman film and the third-longest superhero film after Zack Snyder's Justice League (2021) and Avengers: Endgame (2019). The film was produced by Warner Bros. Pictures, DC Films, Reeves's 6th & Idaho, and Dylan Clark Productions, on a budget of $185–200 million, with Pattinson earning a salary of $3 million.

== Music ==
Reeves announced that his frequent collaborator Michael Giacchino would compose the score in October 2019, by which time Giacchino had already written the main theme. Giacchino completed the score in October 2021, and his main theme was released as a single on January 20, 2022. The full soundtrack album was released on February 25. The Nirvana song "Something in the Way" (1991) appears twice in the film. The song has a similar bassline to Giacchino's score, which he clarified was a coincidence and explained he was fortunate that his work "lied in perfectly against that song." "Ave Maria" by Franz Schubert is also featured and was performed by the Tiffin Boys' Choir and Dano.

== Marketing ==
Test footage of Robert Pattinson wearing the Batsuit, which was released by Matt Reeves to promote the film, generated discussion about his approach to the Batman character.

Reeves released "moody, red-saturated" test footage of Pattinson in his Batman costume on February 13, 2020. It included early music written by Giacchino, and generated discussion about the film's approach to Batman. Chris Evangelista of SlashFilm thought Pattinson's Batman looked much different from previous film depictions, while Richard Newby of The Hollywood Reporter identified the costume's various references to past incarnations. Newby also speculated the possibility that the costume's bat emblem on the chest could be the same pistol used to kill Batman's parents in his origin story. The footage's use of red also led to discussions of how The Batman would differ tonally from prior adaptations. On March 4, Reeves released an image of the film's Batmobile, which Dino-Ray Ramos of Deadline Hollywood felt was "sexier and more streamlined" than earlier versions, evoking "James Bond–meets–Fast and Furious energy" that seemed appropriate for Pattinson's character.

Reeves debuted a teaser trailer during the virtual DC FanDome event on August 22, featuring a remix of Nirvana's "Something in the Way" combined with Giacchino's score. The trailer received 34 million views within 24 hours, and according to CNET's Bonnie Burton and Jennifer Bisset, "set the internet on fire". They noted its somber, grim tone. Katrina Nattress of Spin and John Saavedra at Den of Geek respectively described its depiction of Gotham City as "dystopic" and "nightmarish". Adam Chitwood of Collider praised what he saw as a "genuinely refreshing" approach to depicting the world of Batman, with Saavedra writing it made The Batman look more like a detective story than a superhero film. Alex Abad-Santos of Vox felt the film had more in common with the R-rated Batman spin-off Joker (2019) than other contemporary DC films. Abad-Santos also noted that some critics disliked the trailer's dark tone, as previous Batman films were tonally similar, but felt The Batman could provide further nuance to his character and thematic commentary regarding "carte-blanche reactionary violence" and "retribution rewarded with material wealth".

Reeves and Pattinson discussed the film at the Warner Bros. CinemaCon panel on August 24, 2021, where a sizzle reel of new footage was shown. Reeves, Pattinson, and Kravitz debuted a second trailer as the finale of DC FanDome on October 16. Daniel Chin at The Ringer said the trailer had been highly anticipated and felt it did not disappoint. He and other commentators highlighted the trailer's dark, violent, and brutal approach to the character, which Chin felt was consistent with the teaser trailer. Adam B. Vary of Variety specifically compared the tone to Christopher Nolan's "gritty" The Dark Knight films, believing The Batman would be darker and more violent than even those films. Several commentators highlighted Farrell's physical transformation as the Penguin. A Japanese trailer released on December 12 led to speculation that the Joker would appear after fans spotted a figure resembling the character on a newspaper prop in the footage.

Warner Bros. launched a viral marketing campaign in December 2021 with the website rataalada.com; Rata alada is Spanish for "winged rat". The website allowed users to engage in simulated conversations with the Riddler, and solving his riddles unlocked promotional material. The final reward for the website was the deleted scene where Batman meets Keoghan's Joker in Arkham. A third trailer, titled "The Bat and the Cat", was released on December 27 and focuses on Batman and Catwoman's relationship. SlashFilm's Jeremy Mathai already felt the film's marketing had been great and was impressed that this was "yet another incredible trailer". Asha Barbaschow and Rob Bricken of Gizmodo opined that Pattinson looked like a better Batman than Bale and Affleck, and were intrigued by the idea of the Riddler positioning himself as an "agent of justice" and the film's potential alternations to Batman's origin story. WarnerMedia spent $135 million promoting the film, including over $28 million on television advertisements, and licensed a significant amount of merchandise for what it described as the largest Batman merchandise collection in a decade. Batman-related Google Search queries independently began displaying a Bat-Signal Easter egg in February 2022. At the same time, a prequel novel, Before the Batman: An Original Movie Novel, was written by David Lewman and was also released on February 1. It explores the origins of Batman and the Riddler. After The Batman's release in March, Reeves announced the DC Black Label prequel comic book series The Riddler: Year One (2022–23), which Dano wrote and further explores the Riddler's origin.

== Release ==
=== Theatrical ===
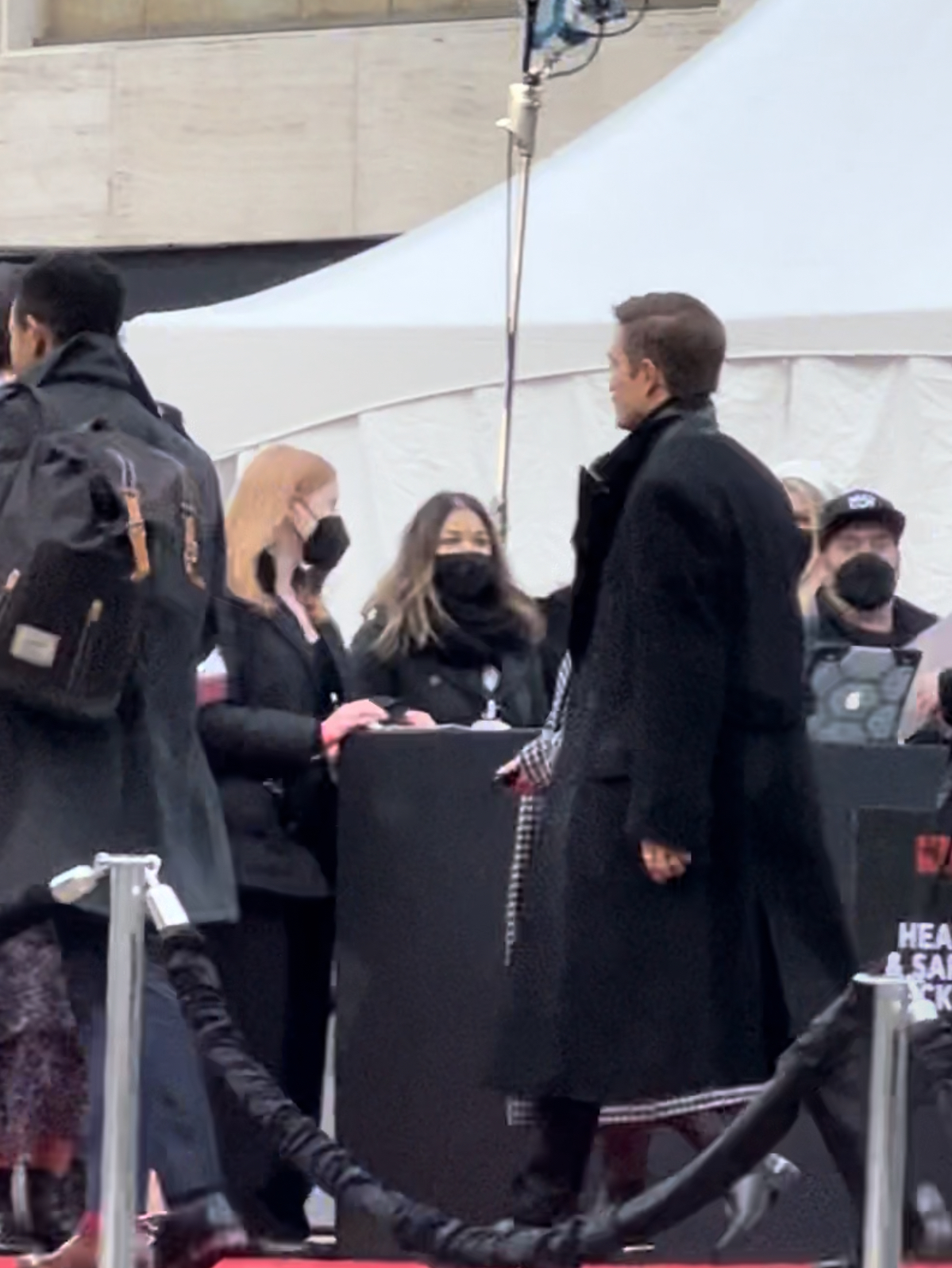
Robert Pattinson at the New York City premiere of The Batman

Special screenings for The Batman were held in Paris and London in late February 2022. The film's world premiere was held at Lincoln Center in New York City on March 1, 2022, alongside 350 advance IMAX screenings across the United States, ahead of its wide release by Warner Bros. Pictures on March 4. It was the first Warner Bros.–distributed film in over a year that did not stream on HBO Max simultaneously with its theatrical release during the COVID-19 pandemic. The film was originally set for release on June 25, 2021, but was delayed twice, initially to October 1, 2021, and then to the March 2022 date, both times after Warner Bros. adjusted its release schedule due to the pandemic. The Batman was the first superhero film released in China since DC's Wonder Woman 1984 (2020), after multiple others were denied releases in 2021. In February 2022, Warner Bros. canceled the film's Russian release due to the 2022 Russian invasion of Ukraine.

=== Home media ===
The Batman was released for digital download and streaming on HBO Max on April 18, 2022, followed by its linear television premiere on HBO on April 23. Warner Bros. Home Entertainment released the film for Blu-ray, Ultra HD Blu-ray, and DVD on May 24. According to Samba TV, 720,000 American households streamed the film during its first day of release on HBO Max. It also had the most successful premiere for any film on HBO Max in Latin America. Samba TV reported that by the end of its first week, the film had been watched by 4.1 million American households. This was higher than the viewership for nearly all day-and-date films released on HBO Max and the second best for a film on the platform during the first week of release, behind Mortal Kombat (2021), which had a viewership of 4.3 million households.

== Reception ==
=== Box office ===
The Batman grossed $369.3 million in the United States and Canada, and $402.9 million in other territories, for a worldwide total of $772.3 million. It is the seventh-highest-grossing film of 2022, as well as the highest-grossing serial killer film. The film's IMAX performance helped raise the IMAX Corporation's overall first-quarter revenue ($60 million) by 55% and its global box office ($173.2 million) by 57% from the same period in 2021. Deadline Hollywood calculated the film's net profit as $177 million, accounting for production budgets, marketing, talent participations, and other costs; box office grosses and home media revenue placed it seventh on their list of 2022's "Most Valuable Blockbusters".

In the U.S. and Canada, The Batman was projected to gross $115–170 million from 4,417 theaters in its opening weekend, and around $330–475 million for its total domestic box office. Tickets for the advance IMAX screenings sold out within a day of going on sale on February 8, 2022. The film made $57 million on its first day in the U.S. and Canada, which included $17.6 million from Thursday night previews and $4 million from Tuesday and Wednesday advanced screenings. It grossed $134 million in its opening weekend, becoming the second film released during the COVID-19 pandemic to gross over $100 million in the U.S. and Canada in its opening weekend, after Spider-Man: No Way Home (2021). It also became Warner Bros.' highest-grossing pandemic era film domestically in just three days, surpassing Dune (2021). More than 65% of the audience in the opening weekend was male, while more than 60% were 18–34 years old. The film stayed atop the box office in its second weekend, grossing $66.5 million for a 50% drop. The third weekend saw it gross $36.7 million, a fall of 45%, while also making it the second film in the pandemic era to make more than $300 million in the U.S. and Canada. In the fourth weekend it was displaced to the second spot by The Lost City, earning $20.5 million for a drop of 44%.

In South Korea, The Batman opened to $1.7 million, the biggest opening in the country in 2022. Through March 2, it had earned $5.3 million across eight countries. In France, it earned $2.1 million, the highest opening of 2022. Through March 4, it had earned an estimated $54 million in 74 countries outside the U.S. and Canada. In the United Kingdom, it opened to $6.4 million, the second-highest opening in the country during the pandemic. It had the second-highest pandemic opening in Spain as well, earning $1.2 million. It grossed around $124.2 million by the end of the week in 74 countries outside the U.S. and Canada, and ranked first in 73 of them during the weekend. It earned $22.3 million globally in IMAX theaters, the second-highest opening weekend for the chain since December 2019. This was also the highest opening for a movie outside the U.S. and Canada in 2022, the highest for Warner in the pandemic era, as well as the third biggest overall during the pandemic. Additionally, it had the second-highest opening weekend of the pandemic era in sixteen countries including the United Kingdom ($18.1 million), Mexico ($12.1 million), Australia ($9.3 million), Brazil ($8.8 million), France ($8.4 million), Germany ($5.1 million), South Korea ($4.4 million), Italy ($4.1 million), Spain ($3.7 million), and India ($3.4 million). It also earned the biggest opening weekend for Warner Bros. in 62 countries during the pandemic and its biggest-ever opening weekend in seven countries.

The film earned $66.6 million from 76 markets outside the U.S. and Canada in its sophomore weekend for a 42% drop, including a $3.2 million opening in Japan. The film reached the $500 million milestone on March 17, becoming the eighth pandemic-era film to do so, while also becoming Warner Bros.' highest-grossing film during the pandemic. In its third weekend, it made $49.1 million in countries other than the U.S. and Canada, a drop of 46%. In China, it opened to a $11.8 million weekend according to Artisan Gateway while 30–43% of the theaters were closed, the best opening in the country for an American film in 2022, acquiring the top position at the box office. It grossed $25.3 million during the fourth weekend for a fall of 49%, including $3.1 million in China, where it was displaced by Moonfall. It crossed the $750 million-milestone on April 17, becoming the fifth pandemic era film to do so, with the largest running-total countries being the United Kingdom ($53.2 million), Mexico ($30.7 million), Australia ($27 million), France ($25.9 million), Brazil ($22.6 million), China ($22.5 million), Germany ($18.9 million), Spain ($11.8 million), Italy ($11.2 million), and Japan ($10 million).

=== Critical response ===
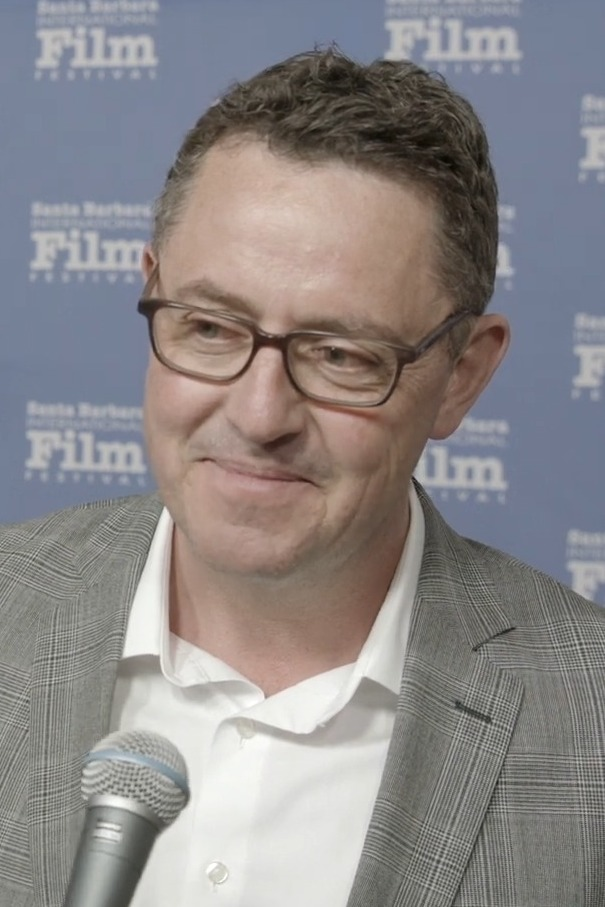
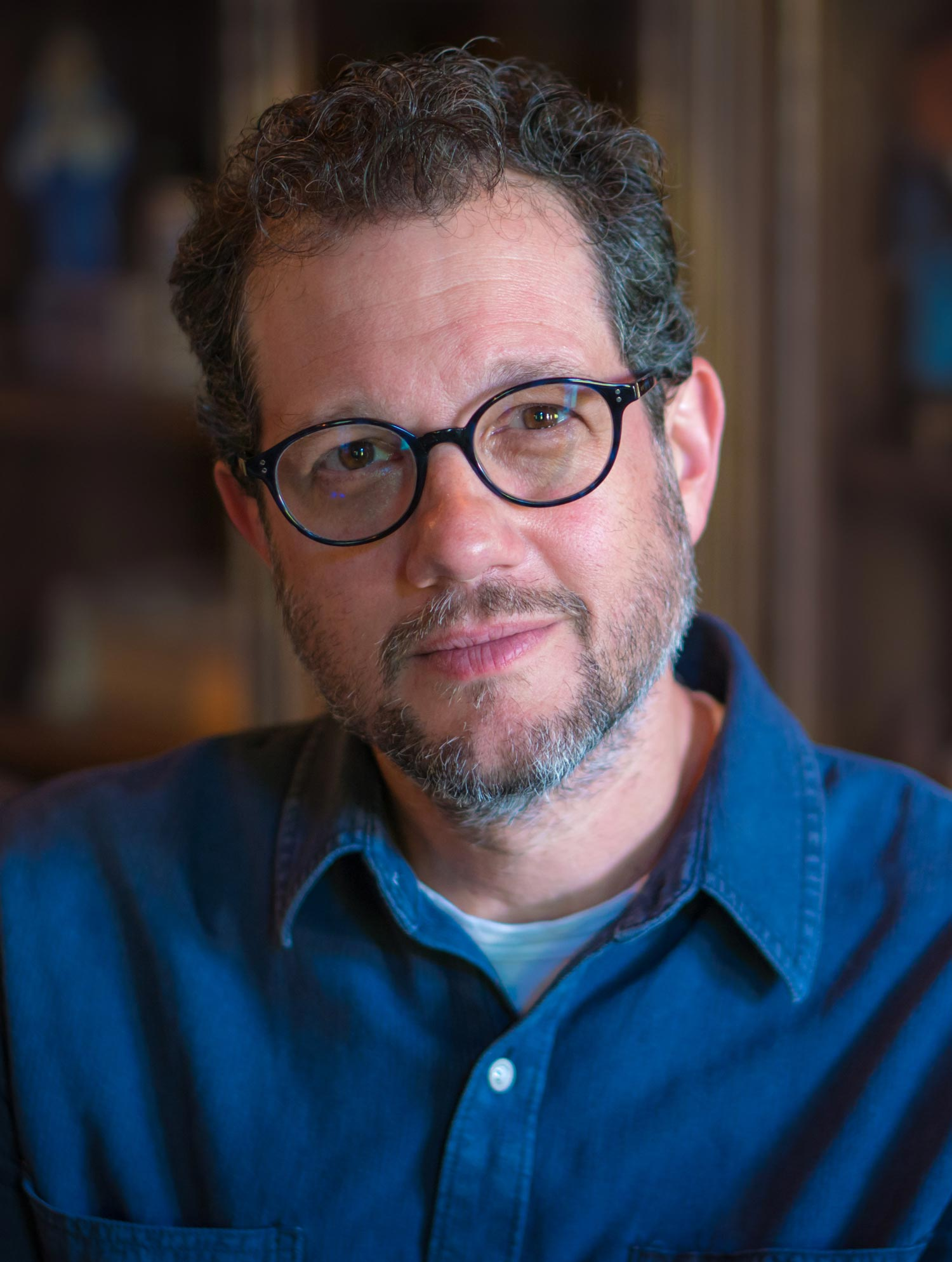
The cinematography work by Greig Fraser and composer Michael Giacchino's score received positive responses from critics.

Critics hailed The Batman as one of the best Batman films and a revival of the franchise, praising Reeves's grounded direction and focus on the titular character, the noir detective narrative, Pattinson and Kravitz's performances, the cinematography, and the score. However, the dark, serious tone and the long runtime received mixed responses, while the third act drew some criticism. On review aggregator Rotten Tomatoes, 85% of 526 critics gave the film a positive review and an average rating of 7.7/10. The website's critics' consensus reads, "A grim, gritty, and gripping super-noir, The Batman ranks among the Dark Knight's bleakest—and most thrillingly ambitious—live-action outings." Metacritic assigned the film a weighted average score of 72 out of 100, based on 68 critics, indicating "generally favorable" reviews. Audiences surveyed by CinemaScore gave it an average of "A−" on an A-to-F scale, while those polled at PostTrak gave it an 87% positive score and four-and-a-half out of five stars, with 71% saying they would definitely recommend it.

IGN contributor Alex Stedman rated it 10 out of 10, commending its accuracy to the comics, the performances of Pattinson and Kravitz, and the film's production values. He particularly noted the chemistry between Pattinson and Kravitz, calling Kravitz's performance the best in the film. Adam Nayman of The Ringer favorably compared the film's technical aspects and visual style to works by Alfred Hitchcock. However, he criticized the final act and found the climax underwhelming, feeling it echoed Joker (2019) too closely. Despite these critiques, Nayman appreciated how the film handled Batman's psychology. Jason Mottram of The National called it "one of the darkest and most compelling comic-book movies of the modern era", hailing the performances, action, and story, particularly Reeves's portrayal of the Penguin and Batman as the "'World's Greatest Detective'".

Digital Spy reviewer Ian Sandwell highlighted the film's "film-noir vibes" and strong production values, lauding its focus on Batman as a detective, which he felt justified the runtime. Clarisse Loughrey from The Independent admired the visual aesthetic for blending realism with Gothic elements, but felt the runtime was excessive, and rated it four out of five. David Rooney of The Hollywood Reporter praised the film's "intelligent, emotionally nuanced storytelling", its exploration of institutional corruption, and its unique Gothic identity, though he wished for more levity. Peter Debruge at Variety admired the film's noir elements and its interrogation of the superhero concept, finding it relevant to contemporary issues. Alex Abad-Santos of Vox appreciated the film's detective-oriented story and exploration of Batman's character.

However, some critics were less enthusiastic. Richard Brody of The New Yorker liked the first two hours but felt the characters were underdeveloped, reducing the impact of the climax. Ann Hornaday from The Washington Post rated it one-and-a-half out of four, criticizing its dark visuals, runtime, and reliance on dialogue, although she appreciated Pattinson's performance. Mick LaSalle of the San Francisco Chronicle also gave a negative review, finding the political commentary and tone unvaried, and criticizing the film's length. Similarly, A. O. Scott of The New York Times praised the performances and score but found the dark visuals and exposition overwhelming. Kim Newman of Sight and Sound criticized the film's length and felt the secondary characters were underdeveloped. However, he enjoyed the detective aspects and visuals.

=== Accolades ===
At the 95th Academy Awards, The Batman received nominations for Best Sound, Best Makeup and Hairstyling, and Best Visual Effects. The film's other nominations include four British Academy Film Awards and three Critics' Choice Movie Awards.

== Thematic analysis ==
=== Class conflict and inequality ===
Class conflict is a central concept featured in The Batman, with Marco Vito Oddo of Collider asserting that the main theme is social inequality. Three of the primary characters—Batman, the Riddler, and Catwoman—are orphans from different economic backgrounds. Whereas Batman grew up in privilege, the Riddler only knew torment, while Catwoman experienced hardship. The Riddler's frustration with his upbringing leads to him lashing out against the wealthy, reflecting that criminality is born from desperation. JM Mutore of The A.V. Club and Susana Polo of Polygon said the Riddler falls into "the trap of villains who are right", opining that he is correct to expose the corruption that has harmed the unfortunate. Chrishaun Baker of Inverse added that the film never frames the Riddler's frustration as wrong, though Brandon Zachary of Comic Book Resources argued that the Riddler is "inherently wrong" to think that change can be achieved through violence even if his motivations are understandable.

Zachary wrote that Batman, Catwoman, and the Riddler's upbringings give each character a different worldview: Batman's is narrow and binary, the Riddler adopts a "bitter and cruel" method to fight corruption that harms innocents, and Catwoman acknowledges the corrupting power of wealth but only becomes violent when her friends are harmed. The film draws parallels between Batman and his adversaries, the Riddler and Catwoman, who serve as foils to the character. Adam Nayman of The Ringer felt the film highlighted the themes of duality between Batman and his foes, and opined that Batman and the Riddler feel like "secret siblings" rather than "two different case studies in forlorn orphan psychology". Catwoman and the Riddler make Batman realize that poverty and inequality are the roots of Gotham's troubles, and inspire him to become an agent of hope and use his wealth to prevent social inequality. Baker wrote that the film ends with Batman realizing he "has to fight for the will of the people, amongst the people, against the very same institutions that make hollow promises to protect them".

=== Depiction of Batman ===
Chrishaun Baker of Inverse said that previous Batman films tend to reflect right-wing themes, with directors Tim Burton and Christopher Nolan's adaptations respectively featuring libertarian and "vaguely authoritarian" depictions of Batman. The Batman departs by questioning Batman's ethics and focusing on his material wealth. The film highlights that Batman's wealth does not alleviate his suffering and explores the idea that he should be more philanthropic; initially, Batman does not realize he is taking his wealth for granted and could be using it to help Gotham. The A.V. Club's JM Mutore felt The Batman was more direct in addressing the issue than previous Batman films, but "circumvents this argument" by portraying Thomas Wayne's attempt at philanthropy as only leading to corruption. Baker felt the film directly addresses the issue by having progressive mayoral candidate Bella Reál confront Bruce about his wealth. Conversely, The Ringer's Adam Nayman argued the film does not focus on his class as much as previous films did because he is depicted as a recluse.

The Batman also explores grief, trauma, and the "horror" of living with post-traumatic stress disorder through Batman. Batman's initial antagonism towards Alfred and apathy towards Catwoman's situation stem from the death of his parents and his inability to communicate with people due to his fear of suffering more emotional pain. His obsession with solving the Riddler case is a method of coping with the trauma of losing his parents. In contrast, his obsession with being Batman is the result of channeling his rage into what Marcus Shorter of Bloody Disgusting called a "dogmatic dedication to his chosen crimefighting craft". The film concludes with Batman recognizing that he must process his trauma to help improve Gotham. Batman's relationship with law enforcement differs from that in previous Batman films. Burton's films depict the police as an incompetent force that Batman supersedes, while Nolan's films depict them as willing to bend the law to assist him. The Batman portrays Batman as having a hostile relationship with the Gotham police, who view him as a criminal. Baker said that "[e]very time Batman interacts with the police, there's a palpable sense of discomfort; to them, Batman represents a level of oversight that they're not used to having to contend with".

== Future ==
The Batman is intended to start its own film trilogy and shared universe called the "Batman Epic Crime Saga", which also includes the spin-off television series The Penguin (2024). DC Studios has classified these as part of its "DC Elseworlds" label, remaining set in a separate continuity from its franchise, the DC Universe (DCU). DC Studios did consider integrating Pattinson's Batman and Reeves's plans into the DCU before rejecting such a notion. Reeves has plans for multiple film and television spin-offs from The Batman centered on members of Batman's rogues gallery.

=== Sequel ===
The Batman: Part II is scheduled to be released on February 18, 2028, with Reeves returning as the director and co-writer with Mattson Tomlin. The sequel was announced in April 2022, but production was delayed multiple times while Reeves meticulously worked on the script, which was completed in June 2025, and filming started a year later. Pattinson returns alongside Jeffrey Wright as Jim Gordon, Andy Serkis as Alfred Pennyworth, Colin Farrell as the Penguin, Jayme Lawson as Mayor Bella Reál, and Gil Perez-Abraham as GCPD officer Martinez, with Barry Keoghan also expected to return as the Joker. They are set to be joined by Sebastian Stan as Harvey Dent, Scarlett Johansson as his wife Gilda, and Charles Dance as his father, Charles Dent, alongside Sebastian Koch and Brian Tyree Henry in undisclosed roles. Part II focuses on Batman's Bruce Wayne alter ego, more than previous Batman films, as he investigates another case that explores further corruption and division within Gotham City in the aftermath of its flooding.

=== Spin-off series ===
The eight-episode HBO series The Penguin aired from September 19 to November 10, 2024. It explores the Penguin's rise to power in Gotham's criminal underworld following the events of The Batman. Farrell stars as the Penguin, and was an executive producer with Reeves, Clark, showrunner Lauren LeFranc, and lead director Craig Zobel. HBO Max was developing the series by September 2021, and ordered it as a limited series in March 2022, after The Batman's release. Cristin Milioti co-stars as Sofia Gigante (née Falcone), the daughter of Carmine Falcone, who appears as a younger version in flashbacks, portrayed by Mark Strong, while Clancy Brown plays Salvatore Maroni. Additional actors reprising their roles from The Batman in The Penguin are Jayme Lawson as Bella Reál, Peter McDonald as William Kenzie, and Con O'Neill as Mackenzie Bock. A potential second season was reported to be "in limbo" by August 2026.

HBO Max began developing another spin-off series centered on the Gotham City Police Department (GCPD) in July 2020. Terence Winter was hired as the showrunner for the police procedural prequel series, set during Batman's first year fighting crime. The series would focus on the corruption in Gotham and the GCPD, and follow a particular crooked cop in a "battle for his soul", inspired by the film Prince of the City (1981). Winter left due to creative differences in November, and was replaced by Joe Barton in January 2021. HBO still had creative issues with the project, especially with its protagonist being a corrupt cop, and encouraged Reeves to focus on existing comic characters instead. In March 2022, Reeves said the series was on indefinite hold, but that initial work led to a new series based on the Arkham State Hospital, envisioning a horror tone, depicting Arkham as a haunted house while building upon its introduction in the film, and exploring the origins of different characters related to it. Showrunner and director Antonio Campos was developing the Arkham series for the DCU by that October, when the GCPD series was being developed again. Both series were no longer moving forward by July 2024, though some elements of the GCPD series were integrated into The Penguin. Reeves explained that HBO was interested in moving forward with spin-offs that focused on the "marquee characters" associated with Batman. Lesley Goldberg at The Ankler reported in August 2026 that HBO and DC Studios had heard pitches for series focused on Catwoman and Poison Ivy, but turned down both; Reeves had previously expressed interest in a Catwoman spin-off and had informal discussions with HBO about it. By October 2026, LeFranc was in negotiations to produce the Poison Ivy series, which would remain separate from The Batman.
