= Dylan Cole =

American painter

Dylan Cole is an American Digital Matte-Painter and concept artist specializing in work for film, television, and video games. Cole received a degree in fine arts from UCLA. He is best known for his work on feature films like The Lord of the Rings trilogy, Avatar and its sequel, Daredevil, Alice in Wonderland, Tron: Legacy, Maleficent and The Chronicles of Riddick. He recently published his first book, The Otherworldly Adventures of Tyler Washburn.

== Matte-painting community ==
Cole co-authored the book D'artiste Matte Painting: Digital Artists Master Class in which he shares of his work process and industry experiences throughout his career, and through the Gnomon Workshop has released instructional DVDs featuring his digital matte painting techniques.

== Recognition ==
=== Awards and nominations ===
As part of the team that created the artwork for James Cameron's 2009 film Avatar Cole received a 2010 Directors Guild of America Award for Excellence in Production Design. He also received nominations from Art Directors Guild for Excellence In Production Design For A Fantasy Feature Film for both Alice in Wonderland and Tron: Legacy. Cole stated that his inspiration for the forests of Avatar came from a trip on the Kuranda Skyrail.

== Partial filmography ==
- Daredevil (2003)
- The Lord of the Rings: The Return of the King (2003)
- Van Helsing (2004)
- The Chronicles of Riddick (2004)
- I, Robot (2004)
- Little Black Book (2004)
- Sky Captain and the World of Tomorrow (2004)
- The Aviator (2004)
- Flight of the Phoenix (2004)
- The Ring Two (2005)
- A Sound of Thunder (2005)
- Herbie: Fully Loaded (2005)
- Four Brothers (2005)
- The Chronicles of Narnia: The Lion, the Witch and the Wardrobe (2005)
- The Fast and the Furious: Tokyo Drift (2006)
- Superman Returns (2006)
- Evan Almighty (2007)
- The Kite Runner (2007)
- The Golden Compass (2007)
- 3:10 to Yuma (2007)
- Pirates of the Caribbean: At World's End (2007)
- Speed Racer (2008)
- The Mummy: Tomb of the Dragon Emperor (2008)
- The Spiderwick Chronicles (2008)
- John Adams (7 episodes, 2008) (TV)
- Eagle Eye (2008)
- G.I. Joe: The Rise of Cobra (2009)
- The Road (2009)
- Avatar (2009)
- Land of the Lost (2009)
- 2012 (2009)
- Clash of the Titans (2010)
- Alice in Wonderland (2010)
- Tron: Legacy (2010)
- Transformers: Dark of the Moon (2011)
- Avatar: The Way of Water (2022)
