= Rick Heinrichs =

American film producer

Richard Heinrichs (born 1954) is an American production designer, effects artist, art director and film producer. He is well known for his frequent collaborations with director Tim Burton and his work on the Pirates of the Caribbean series, Ang Lee's Hulk and The Nightmare Before Christmas. He started his career on visual effects on the other world sequence in The Watcher in the Woods, Tim Burton's Hansel and Gretel and Vincent to later work on Alfred Hitchcock Presents and Nutcracker: The Motion Picture. He also worked on Frankenweenie. He won the Academy Award for Best Art Direction for Sleepy Hollow at the 72nd Academy Awards, and received further nominations for Lemony Snicket's A Series of Unfortunate Events (2004) and Pirates of the Caribbean: Dead Man's Chest (2006).

He also contributed conceptional designs for Tim Burton's failed Superman Lives project.

== Biography ==
Heinrichs grew up in Baltimore. He graduated from Boston University in 1976 with a degree in fine arts. Heinrichs then joined California Institute of the Arts, where he met Tim Burton and became a regular collaborator of his. The two initially collaborated on The Fox and the Hound at Disney.

== Filmography ==
Year	Title	Director	Notes	Awards
1980	The Watcher in the Woods	John Hough; Vincent McEveety	alien designer: Other World sequence	
1982	Vincent	Tim Burton	producer additional designer, sculptor	
1982	Hansel and Gretel	Tim Burton	producer stop-motion animator	
1984	Frankenweenie	Tim Burton	associate producer	
1984	The Adventures of Buckaroo Banzai Across the 8th Dimension	W. D. Richter	stop motion animator: Greenlite	
1985	Pee-wee's Big Adventure	Tim Burton	animated effect supervisor	
1986	Alfred Hitchcock Presents: "The Jar"	Tim Burton	special effects	
1986	Faerie Tale Theatre: "Aladdin and His Wonderful Lamp"	Tim Burton	models and effects	
1986	Nutcracker: The Motion Picture	Carroll Ballard	model and miniatures supervisor	
1988	Beetlejuice	Tim Burton	visual effects consultant	
1989	Ghostbusters II	Ivan Reitman	set designer	
1990	Joe Versus the Volcano	John Patrick Shanley	set designer	
1990	Edward Scissorhands	Tim Burton	set designer	
1991	To the Moon, Alice	Jessie Nelson	set designer	
1991	Soapdish	Michael Hoffman	assistant art director	
1991	The Fisher King	Terry Gilliam	set designer	
1992	Batman Returns	Tim Burton	art director	
1993	Last Action Hero	John McTiernan	art director	
1993	The Nightmare Before Christmas	Henry Selick	visual consultant	
1995	Tall Tale	Jeremiah S. Chechik	art director	
1995	Fallen Angels	various	production designer	Nominated - CableACE Awards≥ for Art Direction in a Dramatic Special or Series/Movie or Miniseries
1996	Fargo	Joel Coen, Ethan Coen	production designer	Nominated - 20/20 Awards for Art Direction
1998	The Big Lebowski	Joel Coen, Ethan Coen	production designer	
1999	Sleepy Hollow	Tim Burton	production designer	Won - Art Directors Guild Award for Excellence in Production Design for a Feature Film; Won - Awards Circuit Community Awards for Best Art Direction; Won - Las Vegas Film Critics Society Awards for Best Production Direction; Won - Los Angeles Film Critics Association Awards for Best Production Direction; Won - Online Film & Television Association for Best Production Direction; Won - Satellite Award for Best Art Direction and Production Design
2000	Bedazzled	Harold Ramis	production designer	
2001	Planet of the Apes	Tim Burton	production designer	
2003	Hulk	Ang Lee	production designer	
2004	Lemony Snicket's A Series of Unfortunate Events	Brad Silberling	production designer actor	Won - Art Directors Guild Award for Excellence in Production Design for a Feature Film; Nominated - International Cinephile Society Awards for Best Production Design; Nominated - Online Film & Television Association for Best Production Design
2006	Pirates of the Caribbean: Dead Man's Chest	Gore Verbinski	production designer	Nominated - Art Directors Guild Award for Excellence in Production Design for a Feature Film
2007	Pirates of the Caribbean: At World's End	Gore Verbinski	production designer	Nominated - Art Directors Guild Award for Excellence in Production Design for a Feature Film
2010	The Wolfman	Joe Johnston	production designer	
2011	Captain America: The First Avenger	Joe Johnston	production designer	Nominated - Art Directors Guild Award for Excellence in Production Design for a Feature Film
2012	Dark Shadows	Tim Burton	production designer	
2012	Frankenweenie	Tim Burton	production designer	Nominated - Annie Awards for Best Production Design
2014	Big Eyes	Tim Burton	production designer	
2017	Star Wars: The Last Jedi	Rian Johnson	production designer	Nominated - Art Directors Guild Award for Excellence in Production Design for a Feature Film; Nominated - Awards Circuit Community Awards for Best Art Direction; Nominated - Georgia Film Critics Association for Best Art Direction; Nominated - Online Film & Television Association for Best Production Design
2019	Dumbo	Tim Burton	production designer	Nominated - Art Directors Guild for Excellence in Production Design Award
2020	Prop Culture	Jason C. Henry	Himself	
2022	Glass Onion: A Knives Out Mystery	Rian Johnson	production designer	
2025	The Gorge	Scott Derrickson	production designer	
2025	Wake Up Dead Man	Rian Johnson	production designer	

== Accolades ==
=== Academy Awards ===
Year	Nominated work	Category	Result
1999	Sleepy Hollow	Best Art Direction	Won
2004	Lemony Snicket's A Series of Unfortunate Events	Best Art Direction	Nominated
2006	Pirates of the Caribbean: Dead Man's Chest	Best Art Direction	Nominated

=== British Academy Film Awards ===
Year	Nominated work	Category	Result
1999	Sleepy Hollow	Best Production Design	Won
2006	Pirates of the Caribbean: Dead Man's Chest	Best Production Design	Nominated
2014	Big Eyes	Best Production Design	Nominated

=== Saturn Awards ===
Year	Nominated work	Category	Result
2010	The Wolfman	Saturn Award for Best Production Design	Nominated
2011	Captain America: The First Avenger	Saturn Award for Best Production Design	Nominated
2012	Dark Shadows	Saturn Award for Best Production Design	Nominated
2017	Star Wars: The Last Jedi	Saturn Award for Best Production Design	Nominated
2019	Dumbo	Saturn Award for Best Production Design	Nominated
