= Rick Carter =

American production designer and art director

- Born: 1952 (age 73–74); Los Angeles, California, U.S.
- Occupations: Production designer, art director
- Years active: 1976–present
- Notable work: Back to the Future Part II and III, Jurassic Park, Forrest Gump, Avatar, Star Wars: The Rise of Skywalker

Rick Carter (born 1952, Los Angeles, California) is an American production designer and art director. He is best known for his collaborations with directors Steven Spielberg and Robert Zemeckis, particularly on the films Back to the Future Part II, Back to the Future Part III, Jurassic Park, Forrest Gump, The Polar Express, War Horse, and Lincoln. He is also known for his work on James Cameron's Avatar, and for the J. J. Abrams-directed Star Wars films The Force Awakens and The Rise of Skywalker. He is a two-time winner of the Academy Award for Best Production Design for his work on Avatar and Lincoln.

== Early life and education ==
Carter's father was publicist, and later, motion picture producer, Dick Carter. His mother, Ruth, was a one-time Life magazine staffer, and later Realtor in Southern California.

Carter's student days at UCSC were spent painting. Participating in a film panel at 2011's "Bridging the Gap" Arts Division event, the former Art major joined then Arts Dean David Yager in revisiting his alma mater and reliving the unique experience of his UCSC days.

== Career ==
=== Beginnings ===
A conscientious objector to the Vietnam War, he dropped out of the University of California at Berkeley and eventually entered the art department for the first time as an assistant on Hal Ashby’s Bound for Glory (1976) followed by James Bridges’ The China Syndrome (1979).

Film

His first credit as art director was with Ashby again on Second-Hand Hearts (1981), but art-directing The Goonies in 1985 was a pivotal job for the designer, as it led to another key meeting for Carter: with that film's writer and producer Steven Spielberg. The two hit it off and began a close working relationship that endures to the present day.

== Filmography ==
Year	Title	Director	Notes
1989	Three Fugitives	Francis Veber	
1989	Back to the Future Part II	Robert Zemeckis	
1990	Back to the Future Part III	Robert Zemeckis	
1992	Death Becomes Her	Robert Zemeckis	
1993	Jurassic Park	Steven Spielberg	Also wrote an unused draft of the film
1994	Forrest Gump	Robert Zemeckis	
1997	The Lost World: Jurassic Park	Steven Spielberg	
1997	Amistad	Steven Spielberg	
2000	What Lies Beneath	Robert Zemeckis	With William James Teegarden
2000	Cast Away	Robert Zemeckis	
2001	A.I. Artificial Intelligence	Steven Spielberg	
2004	The Polar Express	Robert Zemeckis	With Doug Chiang
2005	War of the Worlds	Steven Spielberg	
2005	Munich	Steven Spielberg	
2009	Avatar	James Cameron	With Robert Stromberg
2011	Sucker Punch	Zack Snyder	
2011	War Horse	Steven Spielberg	
2012	Lincoln	Steven Spielberg	
2015	Star Wars: The Force Awakens	J. J. Abrams	With Darren Gilford
2016	The BFG	Steven Spielberg	With Robert Stromberg
2017	The Post	Steven Spielberg	
2019	Star Wars: The Rise of Skywalker	J. J. Abrams	With Kevin Jenkins
2022	The Fablemans	Steven Spielberg	

== Accolades ==
List of awards and nominations
Ceremony	Category	Year	Film	Result	Ref.
Academy Awards	Best Production Design	1994	Forrest Gump	Nominated	
Academy Awards	Best Production Design	2009	Avatar (shared with Robert Stromberg)	Won	
Academy Awards	Best Production Design	2011	War Horse	Nominated	
Academy Awards	Best Production Design	2012	Lincoln	Won	
Academy Awards	Best Production Design	2022	The Fabelmans	Nominated	
British Academy Film Awards	Best Production Design	2010	Avatar (shared with Robert Stromberg)	Won	
British Academy Film Awards	Best Production Design	2012	War Horse	Nominated	
British Academy Film Awards	Best Production Design	2013	Lincoln	Nominated	
British Academy Film Awards	Best Production Design	2016	Star Wars: The Force Awakens	Nominated	
Critics' Choice Movie Awards	Best Production Design	2009	Avatar (shared with Kim Sinclair and Robert Stromberg)	Won	
Critics' Choice Movie Awards	Best Production Design	2011	War Horse	Nominated	
Critics' Choice Movie Awards	Best Production Design	2012	Lincoln	Nominated	
Critics' Choice Movie Awards	Best Production Design	2022	The Fabelmans	Nominated	
Satellite Awards	Best Production Design	1997	Amistad	Nominated	
Satellite Awards	Best Production Design	2012	Lincoln	Won	
Satellite Awards	Best Production Design	2022	The Fabelmans	Nominated	
Saturn Awards	Best Production Design	2010	Avatar (shared with Robert Stromberg)	Won	
Saturn Awards	Best Production Design	2016	Star Wars: The Force Awakens	Nominated	
Saturn Awards	Best Production Design	2017	The BFG (shared with Robert Stromberg)	Won	
Saturn Awards	Best Production Design	2021	Star Wars: The Rise of Skywalker	Nominated	
