= James Chinlund =

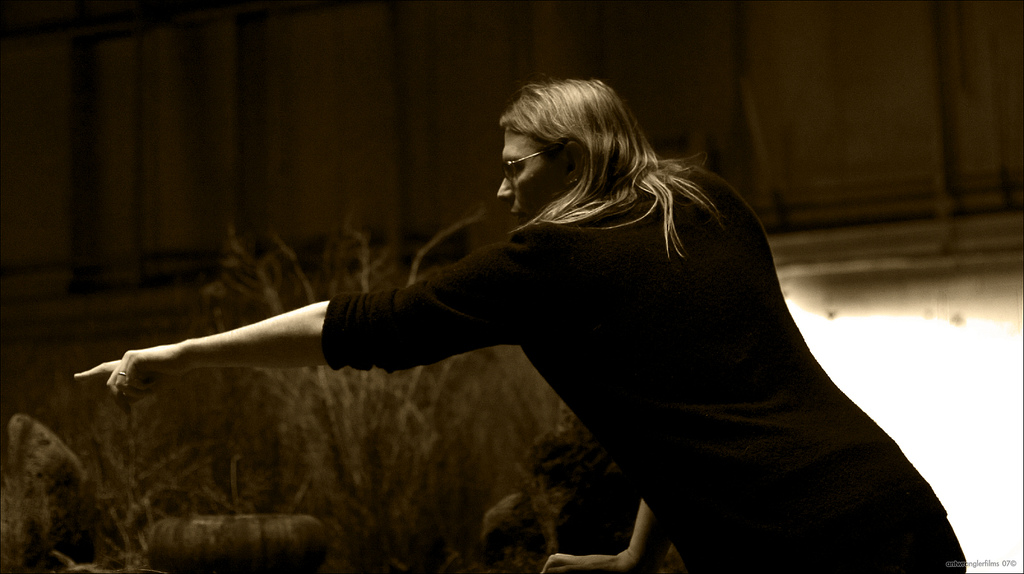
- Born: March 17, 1971 (age 55); New York City, US
- Occupation: Production designer

James Chinlund (born March 17, 1971) is an American production designer. He was born and raised in New York City and studied Fine Art at CalArts in Los Angeles, with a focus on sculpture and large scale installation art works. After graduating, Chinlund returned to New York and started his career in film, first as a carpenter, before finding opportunities as a Production Designer on music videos and independent films. During this period he first worked with frequent collaborator Darren Aronofsky (Requiem for a Dream, The Fountain) in addition to other directors in the New York independent film world including: Todd Solondz (Storytelling), Paul Schrader (Auto Focus) and Spike Lee (25th Hour).

After a short break from features to help care for his young daughter, Chinlund returned to the feature world in 2012 to work on The Avengers for Marvel which set a record for the highest grossing opening weekend ever. Since then he has been nominated six times for Art Director's Guild Awards. Two for his work on the Fox films Dawn of the Planet of the Apes and War for the Planet of the Apes directed by Matt Reeves, and most recently for his work on The Lion King directed by Jon Favreau which was the first feature film ever shot entirely in Virtual Reality. Over the years James has been active in the commercial and fashion worlds as well. Collaborators include: Inez van Lamsweerde and Vinoodh Matadin, Rupert Sanders, Spike Jonze, Marc Forster, Lance Acord, Gus Van Sant and Harmony Korine. James was a production designer on The Batman directed by Matt Reeves, which was released on March 4, 2022.

== Awards ==
- 2009 Art Directors Guild Award for Excellence in Production Design for a commercial or music video
- 2010 AICP Honors for Visual Style

== Filmography ==
- Saturn (1999)
- Requiem for a Dream (2000)
- Lift (2001)
- Storytelling (2001)
- Auto Focus (2002)
- 25th Hour (2002)
- The Final Cut (2004)
- The Fountain (2006)
- Towelhead (2007)
- The Avengers (2012)
- Dawn of the Planet of the Apes (2014)
- War for the Planet of the Apes (2017)
- The Lion King (2019)
- The Batman (2022)
- The Smashing Machine (2025)
- Narnia: The Magician's Nephew (2027)

== Press ==
- Avengers deconstructed: Helicarrier, Stark Tower design secrets - LA Times May 24, 2012
- Designing The Avengers: The Art of Marvel's Most Ambitious Movie - io9 May 2, 2012
- Brand new Avengers concept art takes us inside S.H.I.E.L.D.'s hardware! - io9 January 7, 2013
- Production designer James Chinlund illuminates Puma "Lift" - Boards Magazine March 24, 2009
- This Is How You Design the Avengers' Helicarrier - IGN May 24, 2012
- Film Decor: The Avengers
- Art Directors Guild Magazine

== Sources ==
- Art Directors Guild Magazine
- James Chinlund at IMDb
- James Chinlund | Movies and Biography
- Production Designer: videos featuring James Chinlund
