= List of accolades received by Dune: Part Two =

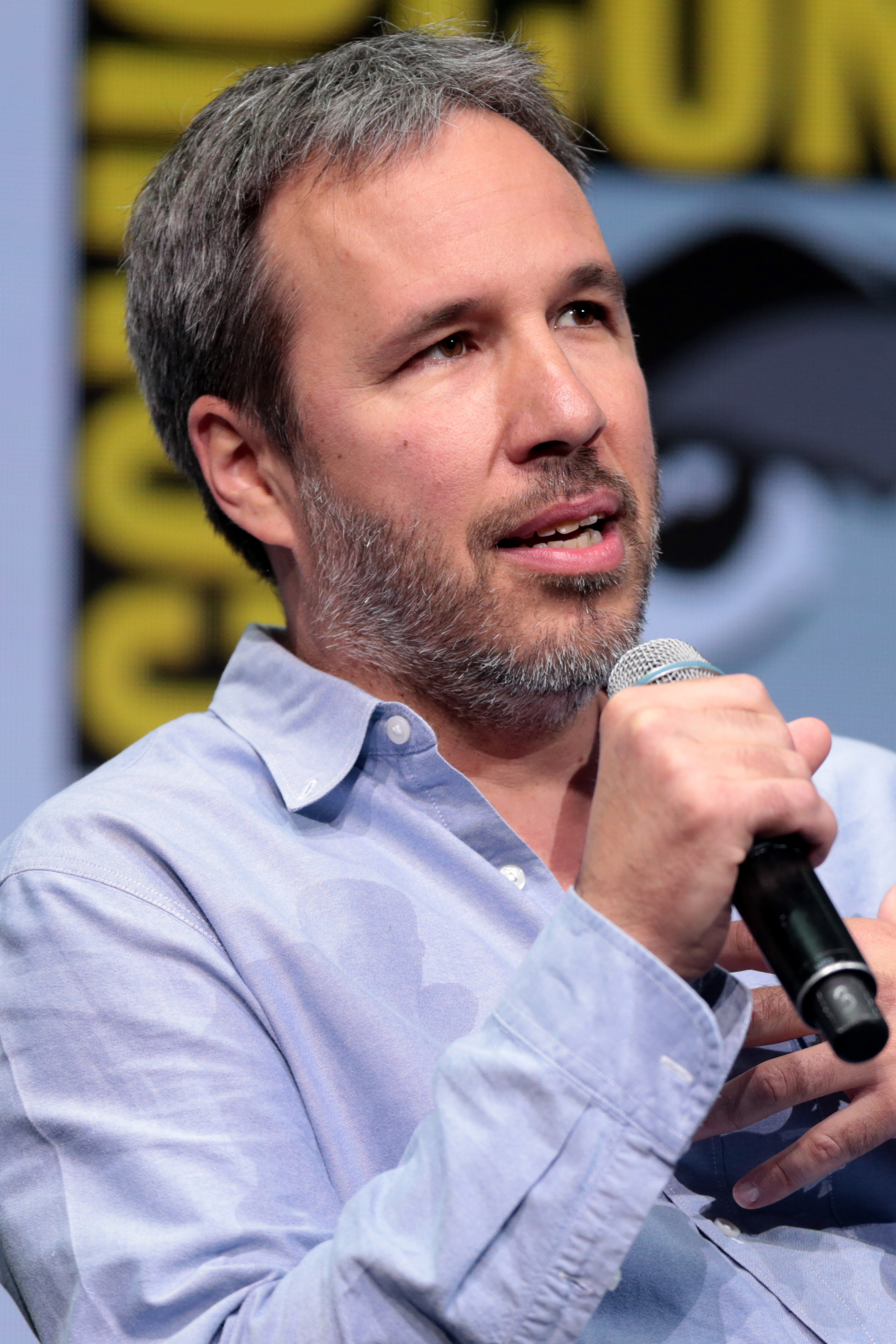
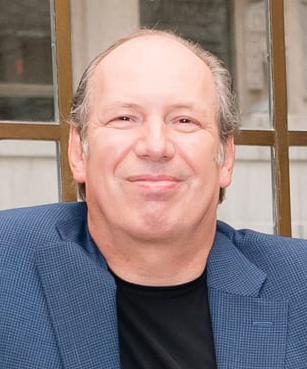
- As with its predecessor, the film received critical acclaim for its technical aspects, direction by Denis Villeneuve, and musical score by Hans Zimmer.
Accolades
| Award | Wins | Nominations |
| AACTA International Awards | 0 | 2 |
| AARP Movies for Grownups Awards | 0 | 1 |
| Academy Awards | 2 | 5 |
| Advanced Imaging Society | 3 | 3 |
| Alliance of Women Film Journalists Awards | 0 | 2 |
| American Cinema Editors Awards | 0 | 1 |
| American Film Institute Awards | 1 | 1 |
| American Society of Cinematographers Awards | 0 | 1 |
| Art Directors Guild Awards | 0 | 1 |
| Artios Awards | 0 | 1 |
| Astra Film and Creative Arts Awards | 4 | 16 |
| Astra Midseason Movie Awards | 3 | 7 |
| Austin Film Critics Association Awards | 1 | 8 |
| British Academy Film Awards | 2 | 7 |
| British Society of Cinematographers | 0 | 1 |
| Camerimage | 0 | 1 |
| Capri Hollywood International Film Festival | 2 | 2 |
| Chicago Film Critics Association Awards | 0 | 5 |
| Cinema Audio Society Awards | 1 | 2 |
| Clio Entertainment Awards | 1 | 1 |
| Costume Designers Guild Awards | 0 | 1 |
| Critics Choice Awards | 1 | 10 |
| Critics' Choice Super Awards | 2 | 5 |
| Dallas–Fort Worth Film Critics Association Awards | 3 | 3 |
| Dorian Awards | 0 | 2 |
| Dublin Film Critics' Circle Awards | 1 | 1 |
| Florida Film Critics Circle Awards | 2 | 5 |
| Georgia Film Critics Association Awards | 5 | 7 |
| Golden Globe Awards | 0 | 2 |
| Golden Reel Awards | 1 | 3 |
| Golden Tomato Awards | 3 | 4 |
| Golden Trailer Awards | 4 | 9 |
| Gotham Awards | 1 | 1 |
| Grammy Awards | 1 | 1 |
| Hollywood Critics Association Midseason Film Awards | 0 | 1 |
| Hollywood Music in Media Awards | 1 | 1 |
| Hollywood Professional Association Awards | 2 | 3 |
| Houston Film Critics Society | 1 | 6 |
| Hugo Awards | 1 | 1 |
| IFTA Awards | 0 | 1 |
| IndieWire Critics Poll | 2 | 2 |
| International Cinephile Society | 0 | 1 |
| International Film Music Critics Association | 0 | 1 |
| Kansas City Film Critics Circle Awards | 2 | 8 |
| Kids' Choice Awards | 0 | 2 |
| Location Managers Guild Awards | 0 | 2 |
| London Film Critics' Circle Awards | 0 | 2 |
| Movieguide Awards | 0 | 1 |
| NAACP Image Awards | 0 | 1 |
| New York Film Critics Online Awards | 0 | 2 |
| Online Film Critics Society Awards | 6 | 10 |
| Palm Springs International Film Festival | 1 | 1 |
| Producers Guild of America Awards | 0 | 1 |
| San Diego Film Critics Society Awards | 5 | 12 |
| San Francisco Bay Area Film Critics Circle Awards | 0 | 3 |
| Santa Barbara International Film Festival | 1 | 1 |
| Satellite Awards | 2 | 9 |
| Saturn Awards | 5 | 14 |
| Screen Actors Guild Awards | 0 | 1 |
| Seattle Film Critics Society Awards | 1 | 10 |
| Set Decorators Society of America Awards | 0 | 1 |
| SFFILM | 1 | 1 |
| Society of Composers & Lyricists Awards | 0 | 1 |
| St. Louis Film Critics Association Awards | 6 | 12 |
| Toronto Film Critics Association Awards | 1 | 1 |
| Vancouver Film Critics Circle Awards | 1 | 1 |
| Visual Effects Society Awards | 4 | 7 |
| Washington D.C. Area Film Critics Association Awards | 1 | 7 |
| Winter IndieWire Honors | 1 | 1 |
| World Soundtrack Awards | 0 | 2 |
| Writers Guild of America Awards | 0 | 1 |

Totals (Note: Certain award groups do not simply award one winner. They acknowledge several different recipients, have runners-up, and have third place. Since this is a specific recognition and is different from losing an award, runner-up mentions are considered wins in this award tally. For simplification and to avoid errors, each award in this list has been presumed to have had a prior nomination.)
- Wins: 91
- Nominations: 255

Dune: Part Two is a 2024 American epic science fiction film directed by Denis Villeneuve, and written by Villeneuve and Jon Spaihts. It serves as a sequel for Dune (2021), both adapted from Frank Herbert's 1965 novel Dune. It follows Paul Atreides as he unites with the Fremen people of the desert planet Arrakis to wage war against House Harkonnen. The ensemble cast includes Timothée Chalamet, Zendaya, Rebecca Ferguson, Josh Brolin, Stellan Skarsgård, Dave Bautista, Charlotte Rampling, and Javier Bardem, who all reprise their roles from the first film. Austin Butler, Florence Pugh, Christopher Walken, and Léa Seydoux also joined the cast.

Following the success of the first film, production for the sequel was greenlit in October 2021. Dune: Part Two had its world premiere at the Auditorio Nacional in Mexico City on February 6, 2024, and was released in theaters in the United States on March 1, 2024. The film grossed $714.4 million worldwide against a budget of $190 million, surpassing its predecessor's box office performance. It was met with positive reviews from critics. On the review aggregator Rotten Tomatoes, the film achieved an average rating of 8.4/10, with 92% of 456 critics' reviews being positive.

Dune: Part Two has received multiple awards and nominations through various categories with praise directed to Villeneuve's direction and Hans Zimmer's score, as well as the film's technical aspects including its cinematography (Greig Fraser), film editing (Joe Walker), costume design (Jacqueline West), production design (Patrice Vermette and Shane Vieau), sound, and visual effects. At the 82nd Golden Globe Awards, the film received nominations for Best Motion Picture – Drama and Best Original Score; while at the 30th Critics' Choice Awards, it garnered ten nominations, including Best Picture and won Best Visual Effects. Furthermore, at the 78th British Academy Film Awards, the film received seven nominations and won two for Best Sound and Best Special Visual Effects. At the 52nd Saturn Awards, it received the most nominations for film with fourteen, winning five, including Best Science Fiction Film.

The film was also named one of the top 10 films of 2024 by the American Film Institute.

== Accolades ==
| Award | Date of ceremony | Category | Recipient(s) | Result | Ref. |
|---|---|---|---|---|---|
| AACTA International Awards | February 7, 2025 | Best Film | Dune: Part Two | Nominated | |
| AACTA International Awards | February 7, 2025 | Best Direction | Denis Villeneuve | Nominated | |
| AARP Movies for Grownups Awards | February 8, 2025 | Best Screenwriter | Denis Villeneuve and Jon Spaihts | Nominated | |
| Academy Awards | March 2, 2025 | Best Picture | Mary Parent, Cale Boyter, Tanya Lapointe, and Denis Villeneuve | Nominated | |
| Academy Awards | March 2, 2025 | Best Cinematography | Greig Fraser | Nominated | |
| Academy Awards | March 2, 2025 | Best Production Design | Patrice Vermette and Shane Vieau | Nominated | |
| Academy Awards | March 2, 2025 | Best Sound | Gareth John, Richard King, Ron Bartlett, and Doug Hemphill | Won | |
| Academy Awards | March 2, 2025 | Best Visual Effects | Paul Lambert, Stephen James, Rhys Salcombe, and Gerd Nefzer | Won | |
| Advanced Imaging Society | February 7, 2025 | Best Feature Film – Live Action | Dune: Part Two | Won | |
| Advanced Imaging Society | February 7, 2025 | Best Theatrical Scene or Sequence | Riding the Sandworm | Won | |
| Advanced Imaging Society | February 7, 2025 | Best Use of High Dynamic Range – Feature Film | Dune: Part Two | Won | |
| Alliance of Women Film Journalists | January 7, 2025 | Best Cinematography | Greig Fraser | Nominated | |
| Alliance of Women Film Journalists | January 7, 2025 | Best Stunt Performance | Alex Jay (for Zendaya) | Nominated | |
| American Cinema Editors Awards | March 14, 2025 | Best Edited Feature Film (Drama, Theatrical) | Joe Walker | Nominated | |
| American Film Institute Awards | December 5, 2024 | Top 10 Films | Dune: Part Two | Honored | |
| American Society of Cinematographers | February 23, 2025 | Theatrical Feature Film | Greig Fraser | Nominated | |
| Art Directors Guild Awards | February 15, 2025 | Excellence in Production Design for a Fantasy Feature Film | Patrice Vermette | Nominated | |
| Artios Awards | February 12, 2025 | Big Budget – Drama | Francine Maisler, Kathy Driscoll-Mohler, Molly Rose, and Dixie Chassay | Nominated | |
| Astra Film and Creative Arts Awards | December 8, 2024 | Best Picture | Dune: Part Two | Nominated | |
| Astra Film and Creative Arts Awards | December 8, 2024 | Best Director | Denis Villeneuve | Nominated | |
| Astra Film and Creative Arts Awards | December 8, 2024 | Best Adapted Screenplay | Denis Villeneuve and Jon Spaihts | Won | |
| Astra Film and Creative Arts Awards | December 8, 2024 | Best Cast Ensemble | Dune: Part Two | Nominated | |
| Astra Film and Creative Arts Awards | December 8, 2024 | Best Casting | Francine Maisler | Nominated | |
| Astra Film and Creative Arts Awards | December 8, 2024 | Best Cinematography | Greig Fraser | Won | |
| Astra Film and Creative Arts Awards | December 8, 2024 | Best Costume Design | Jacqueline West | Nominated | |
| Astra Film and Creative Arts Awards | December 8, 2024 | Best Film Editing | Joe Walker | Nominated | |
| Astra Film and Creative Arts Awards | December 8, 2024 | Best Makeup and Hairstyling | Dune: Part Two | Nominated | |
| Astra Film and Creative Arts Awards | December 8, 2024 | Best Marketing Campaign | Dune: Part Two | Nominated | |
| Astra Film and Creative Arts Awards | December 8, 2024 | Best Original Score | Hans Zimmer | Nominated | |
| Astra Film and Creative Arts Awards | December 8, 2024 | Best Production Design | Patrice Vermette and Shane Vieau | Nominated | |
| Astra Film and Creative Arts Awards | December 8, 2024 | Best Sound | Dune: Part Two | Won | |
| Astra Film and Creative Arts Awards | December 8, 2024 | Best Stunts | Dune: Part Two | Nominated | |
| Astra Film and Creative Arts Awards | December 8, 2024 | Best Stunt Coordinator | Lee Morrison | Nominated | |
| Astra Film and Creative Arts Awards | December 8, 2024 | Best Visual Effects | Dune: Part Two | Won | |
| Astra Midseason Movie Awards | July 3, 2024 | Best Picture | Dune: Part Two | Won | |
| Astra Midseason Movie Awards | July 3, 2024 | Best Director | Denis Villeneuve | Won | |
| Astra Midseason Movie Awards | July 3, 2024 | Best Actor | Timothée Chalamet | Nominated | |
| Astra Midseason Movie Awards | July 3, 2024 | Best Supporting Actor | Austin Butler | Won | |
| Astra Midseason Movie Awards | July 3, 2024 | Best Supporting Actress | Rebecca Ferguson | Nominated | |
| Astra Midseason Movie Awards | July 3, 2024 | Best Screenplay | Denis Villeneuve and Jon Spaihts | Nominated | |
| Astra Midseason Movie Awards | July 3, 2024 | Best Stunts | Dune: Part Two | Nominated | |
| Austin Film Critics Association | January 6, 2025 | Best Picture | Dune: Part Two | 7th place | |
| Austin Film Critics Association | January 6, 2025 | Best Director | Denis Villeneuve | Nominated | |
| Austin Film Critics Association | January 6, 2025 | Best Adapted Screenplay | Denis Villeneuve and Jon Spaihts | Nominated | |
| Austin Film Critics Association | January 6, 2025 | Best Ensemble | Dune: Part Two | Nominated | |
| Austin Film Critics Association | January 6, 2025 | Best Cinematography | Greig Fraser | Nominated | |
| Austin Film Critics Association | January 6, 2025 | Best Editing | Joe Walker | Nominated | |
| Austin Film Critics Association | January 6, 2025 | Best Original Score | Hans Zimmer | Nominated | |
| Austin Film Critics Association | January 6, 2025 | Best Stunt Work | Dune: Part Two | Nominated | |
| British Academy Film Awards | February 16, 2025 | Best Director | Denis Villeneuve | Nominated | |
| British Academy Film Awards | February 16, 2025 | Best Cinematography | Greig Fraser | Nominated | |
| British Academy Film Awards | February 16, 2025 | Best Editing | Joe Walker | Nominated | |
| British Academy Film Awards | February 16, 2025 | Best Make Up & Hair | Love Larson and Eva von Bahr | Nominated | |
| British Academy Film Awards | February 16, 2025 | Best Production Design | Patrice Vermette and Shane Vieau | Nominated | |
| British Academy Film Awards | February 16, 2025 | Best Sound | Ron Bartlett, Doug Hemphill, Gareth John, and Richard King | Won | |
| British Academy Film Awards | February 16, 2025 | Best Special Visual Effects | Paul Lambert, Stephen James, Gerd Nefzer, and Rhys Salcombe | Won | |
| British Society of Cinematographers | February 1, 2025 | Best Cinematography in a Feature Film | Greig Fraser | Nominated | |
| Camerimage | November 23, 2024 | Golden Frog for Best Cinematography | Greig Fraser | Nominated | |
| Capri Hollywood International Film Festival | January 2, 2025 | Best Film Editing | Joe Walker | Honored | |
| Capri Hollywood International Film Festival | January 2, 2025 | Best Visual Effects | Dune: Part Two | Honored | |
| Chicago Film Critics Association | December 12, 2024 | Best Art Direction / Production Design | Dune: Part Two | Nominated | |
| Chicago Film Critics Association | December 12, 2024 | Best Cinematography | Greig Fraser | Nominated | |
| Chicago Film Critics Association | December 12, 2024 | Best Costume Design | Jacqueline West | Nominated | |
| Chicago Film Critics Association | December 12, 2024 | Best Original Score | Hans Zimmer | Nominated | |
| Chicago Film Critics Association | December 12, 2024 | Best Use of Visual Effects | Dune: Part Two | Nominated | |
| Cinema Audio Society Awards | February 22, 2025 | Filmmaker Award | Denis Villeneuve | Honored | |
| Cinema Audio Society Awards | February 22, 2025 | Outstanding Achievement in Sound Mixing for Motion Pictures – Live Action | Production Sound Mixer: Gareth John; Re-Recording Mixers: Ron Bartlett and Doug Hemphill; Scoring Mixer: Alan Meyerson; ADR Mixer: Jason Oliver; Foley Mixers: Tavish Grade and Mikel Parraga-Wills | Nominated | |
| Clio Entertainment Awards | November 14, 2024 | Home Entertainment: Social Media Campaign | "Social Campaign" by Okperfect | Won | |
| Costume Designers Guild Awards | February 6, 2025 | Excellence in Sci-Fi/Fantasy Film | Jacqueline West | Nominated | |
| Critics Choice Awards | February 7, 2025 | Best Picture | Dune: Part Two | Nominated | |
| Critics Choice Awards | February 7, 2025 | Best Director | Denis Villeneuve | Nominated | |
| Critics Choice Awards | February 7, 2025 | Best Adapted Screenplay | Denis Villeneuve and Jon Spaihts | Nominated | |
| Critics Choice Awards | February 7, 2025 | Best Cinematography | Greig Fraser | Nominated | |
| Critics Choice Awards | February 7, 2025 | Best Costume Design | Jacqueline West | Nominated | |
| Critics Choice Awards | February 7, 2025 | Best Editing | Joe Walker | Nominated | |
| Critics Choice Awards | February 7, 2025 | Best Hair and Makeup | Hair and Makeup Team | Nominated | |
| Critics Choice Awards | February 7, 2025 | Best Production Design | Patrice Vermette and Shane Vieau | Nominated | |
| Critics Choice Awards | February 7, 2025 | Best Score | Hans Zimmer | Nominated | |
| Critics Choice Awards | February 7, 2025 | Best Visual Effects | Paul Lambert, Stephen James, Rhys Salcombe, and Gerd Nefzer | Won | |
| Critics' Choice Super Awards | August 7, 2025 | Best Science Fiction/Fantasy Movie | Dune: Part Two | Won | |
| Critics' Choice Super Awards | August 7, 2025 | Best Actor in a Science Fiction/Fantasy Movie | Austin Butler | Nominated | |
| Critics' Choice Super Awards | August 7, 2025 | Best Actor in a Science Fiction/Fantasy Movie | Timothée Chalamet | Won | |
| Critics' Choice Super Awards | August 7, 2025 | Best Actress in a Science Fiction/Fantasy Movie | Zendaya | Nominated | |
| Critics' Choice Super Awards | August 7, 2025 | Best Villain in a Movie | Austin Butler | Nominated | |
| Dallas–Fort Worth Film Critics Association | December 18, 2024 | Best Picture | Dune: Part Two | 4th place | |
| Dallas–Fort Worth Film Critics Association | December 18, 2024 | Best Director | Denis Villeneuve | 3rd place | |
| Dallas–Fort Worth Film Critics Association | December 18, 2024 | Best Cinematography | Greig Fraser | Won | |
| Dorian Awards | February 13, 2025 | Genre Film of the Year | Dune: Part Two | Nominated | |
| Dorian Awards | February 13, 2025 | Visually Striking Film of the Year | Dune: Part Two | Nominated | |
| Dublin Film Critics' Circle | December 19, 2024 | Best Cinematography | Greig Fraser | 2nd place | |
| Florida Film Critics Circle | December 20, 2024 | Best Adapted Screenplay | Denis Villeneuve and Jon Spaihts | Nominated | |
| Florida Film Critics Circle | December 20, 2024 | Best Art Direction / Production Design | Dune: Part Two | Won | |
| Florida Film Critics Circle | December 20, 2024 | Best Cinematography | Greig Fraser | Nominated | |
| Florida Film Critics Circle | December 20, 2024 | Best Original Score | Hans Zimmer | Nominated | |
| Florida Film Critics Circle | December 20, 2024 | Best Visual Effects | Dune: Part Two | Won | |
| Georgia Film Critics Association | January 7, 2025 | Best Picture | Dune: Part Two | Runner-up | |
| Georgia Film Critics Association | January 7, 2025 | Best Director | Denis Villeneuve | Won | |
| Georgia Film Critics Association | January 7, 2025 | Best Adapted Screenplay | Denis Villeneuve and Jon Spaihts | Nominated | |
| Georgia Film Critics Association | January 7, 2025 | Best Ensemble | Dune: Part Two | Nominated | |
| Georgia Film Critics Association | January 7, 2025 | Best Cinematography | Greig Fraser | Won | |
| Georgia Film Critics Association | January 7, 2025 | Best Original Score | Hans Zimmer | Runner-up | |
| Georgia Film Critics Association | January 7, 2025 | Best Production Design | Patrice Vermette and Shane Vieau | Runner-up | |
| Golden Globe Awards | January 5, 2025 | Best Motion Picture – Drama | Dune: Part Two | Nominated | |
| Golden Globe Awards | January 5, 2025 | Best Original Score | Hans Zimmer | Nominated | |
| Golden Reel Awards | February 23, 2025 | Outstanding Achievement in Sound Editing – Feature Dialogue / ADR | Supervising Dialogue Editor: Martin Kwok; Dialogue Editors: Ray Beentjes, Polly McKinnon, and Stefanie Ng; ADR Editor: David Bach; Crowd Editors: Alexis Feodoroff, and Justin Webster | Nominated | |
| Golden Reel Awards | February 23, 2025 | Outstanding Achievement in Sound Editing – Feature Effects / Foley | Supervising Sound Editor: Richard King; Sound Designers: Dave Whitehead, Michael Babcock, Lee Gilmore, and Randy Torres; Sound Effects Editors: Brent Burge, Hayden Collow, Melanie Graham, Michael Mitchell, Jeff Sawyer, Matt Stutter, and Chris Terhune; Supervising Foley Editor: Chris Flick; Foley Editor: Willard Overstreet; Foley Artists: John Cucci and Dan O'Connell | Won | |
| Golden Reel Awards | February 23, 2025 | Outstanding Achievement in Music Editing – Feature Motion Picture | Supervising Music Editors: Clint Bennett and Ryan Rubin; Music Editor: Joe E. Rand | Nominated | |
| Golden Tomato Awards | January 16, 2025 | Best Movie | Dune: Part Two | Won | |
| Golden Tomato Awards | January 16, 2025 | Best Wide Release Movie | Dune: Part Two | Won | |
| Golden Tomato Awards | January 16, 2025 | Best Sci-Fi Movie | Dune: Part Two | Won | |
| Golden Tomato Awards | January 16, 2025 | Fan Favorite Movie | Dune: Part Two | Nominated | |
| Golden Trailer Awards | June 29, 2023 | Best Fantasy Adventure | Dune: Part Two | Nominated | |
| Golden Trailer Awards | June 29, 2023 | The Don LaFontaine Award for Best Voice Over | "Breathtaking" | Nominated | |
| Golden Trailer Awards | May 30, 2024 | Best Action/Thriller TrailerByte for a Feature Film | "Cruel World" (Intermission Film) | Nominated | |
| Golden Trailer Awards | May 30, 2024 | Best Digital – Drama | "Epic Story" (REBEL) | Nominated | |
| Golden Trailer Awards | May 30, 2024 | Best Digital – Fantasy Adventure | "Collection" (REBEL) | Won | |
| Golden Trailer Awards | May 30, 2024 | Best Fantasy/Adventure | Wild Card Creative Group | Won | |
| Golden Trailer Awards | May 30, 2024 | Best Fantasy Adventure TV Spot | "One Destiny" (Wild Card Creative Group) | Won | |
| Golden Trailer Awards | May 30, 2024 | Best Original Score | Wild Card Creative Group | Won | |
| Golden Trailer Awards | May 30, 2024 | Best Sound Editing | Wild Card Creative Group | Nominated | |
| Gotham Awards | December 2, 2024 | Director Tribute | Denis Villeneuve | Honored | |
| Grammy Awards | February 2, 2025 | Best Score Soundtrack for Visual Media | Hans Zimmer | Won | |
| Hollywood Critics Association Midseason Film Awards | June 30, 2023 | Most Anticipated Film | Dune: Part Two | Nominated | |
| Hollywood Music in Media Awards | November 20, 2024 | Best Original Score – Sci-Fi/Fantasy Film | Hans Zimmer | Won | |
| Hollywood Professional Association Awards | November 7, 2024 | Outstanding Color Grading – Live Action Theatrical Feature | David Cole (FotoKem) | Won | |
| Hollywood Professional Association Awards | November 7, 2024 | Outstanding Editing – Theatrical Feature | Joe Walker | Nominated | |
| Hollywood Professional Association Awards | November 7, 2024 | Outstanding Sound – Theatrical Feature | Richard King, Dave Whitehead, Martin Kwok, Ron Bartlett, Doug Hemphill, and Andrew Bock (Warner Bros. Post Production Creative Services) | Won | |
| Houston Film Critics Society | January 14, 2025 | Best Picture | Dune: Part Two | Nominated | |
| Houston Film Critics Society | January 14, 2025 | Best Director | Denis Villeneuve | Nominated | |
| Houston Film Critics Society | January 14, 2025 | Best Cinematography | Greig Fraser | Nominated | |
| Houston Film Critics Society | January 14, 2025 | Best Original Score | Hans Zimmer | Nominated | |
| Houston Film Critics Society | January 14, 2025 | Best Visual Effects | Dune: Part Two | Won | |
| Houston Film Critics Society | January 14, 2025 | Best Stunt Coordination Team | Dune: Part Two | Nominated | |
| Hugo Awards | August 16, 2025 | Best Dramatic Presentation (Long Form) | Dune: Part Two | Won | |
| IFTA Awards | February 14, 2025 | Best International Film | Dune: Part Two | Nominated | |
| IndieWire Critics Poll | December 16, 2024 | Best Film | Dune: Part Two | 8th place | |
| IndieWire Critics Poll | December 16, 2024 | Best Cinematography | Dune: Part Two | 6th place | |
| International Cinephile Society | February 9, 2025 | Best Sound Design | Richard King and Dave Whitehead | Nominated | |
| International Film Music Critics Association | February 27, 2025 | Best Original Score for a Fantasy/Science Fiction Film | Hans Zimmer | Nominated | |
| Kansas City Film Critics Circle | January 4, 2025 | Best Film | Dune: Part Two | Runner-up | |
| Kansas City Film Critics Circle | January 4, 2025 | Best Director | Denis Villeneuve | Nominated | |
| Kansas City Film Critics Circle | January 4, 2025 | Best Actor | Timothée Chalamet | Nominated | |
| Kansas City Film Critics Circle | January 4, 2025 | Best Adapted Screenplay | Denis Villeneuve and Jon Spaihts | Nominated | |
| Kansas City Film Critics Circle | January 4, 2025 | Best Cinematography | Greig Fraser | Nominated | |
| Kansas City Film Critics Circle | January 4, 2025 | Best Original Score | Hans Zimmer | Nominated | |
| Kansas City Film Critics Circle | January 4, 2025 | Best Science Fiction/Fantasy/Horror | Dune: Part Two | Runner-up | |
| Kansas City Film Critics Circle | January 4, 2025 | Best Stunt Ensemble | Dune: Part Two | Nominated | |
| Kids' Choice Awards | July 13, 2024 | Favorite Movie Actress | Zendaya | Nominated | |
| Kids' Choice Awards | July 13, 2024 | Favorite Villain | Austin Butler | Nominated | |
| Location Managers Guild International Awards | August 24, 2024 | Outstanding Film Commission | The Royal Film Commission – Jordan | Nominated | |
| Location Managers Guild International Awards | August 24, 2024 | Outstanding Locations in a Period Feature Film | Dune: Part Two | Nominated | |
| London Film Critics' Circle | February 2, 2025 | Director of the Year | Denis Villeneuve | Nominated | |
| London Film Critics' Circle | February 2, 2025 | Technical Achievement Award | Visual Effects (Paul Lambert) | Nominated | |
| Movieguide Awards | March 6, 2025 | Best Movie for Mature Audiences | Dune: Part Two | Nominated | |
| NAACP Image Awards | February 22, 2025 | Outstanding Original Score for Television/Motion Picture | Dune: Part Two (Original Motion Picture Soundtrack) (WaterTower Music) | Nominated | |
| Nebula Awards | June 7, 2025 | Ray Bradbury Award | Dune: Part 2 | Won | |
| New York Film Critics Online | December 16, 2024 | Best Cinematography | Greig Fraser | Nominated | |
| New York Film Critics Online | December 16, 2024 | Best Use of Music | Dune: Part Two | Nominated | |
| Online Film Critics Society | January 27, 2025 | Best Picture | Dune: Part Two | 7th place | |
| Online Film Critics Society | January 27, 2025 | Best Director | Denis Villeneuve | Nominated | |
| Online Film Critics Society | January 27, 2025 | Best Adapted Screenplay | Dune: Part Two | Nominated | |
| Online Film Critics Society | January 27, 2025 | Best Cinematography | Dune: Part Two | Won | |
| Online Film Critics Society | January 27, 2025 | Best Costume Design | Dune: Part Two | Won | |
| Online Film Critics Society | January 27, 2025 | Best Editing | Dune: Part Two | Nominated | |
| Online Film Critics Society | January 27, 2025 | Best Original Score | Dune: Part Two | Nominated | |
| Online Film Critics Society | January 27, 2025 | Best Production Design | Dune: Part Two | Won | |
| Online Film Critics Society | January 27, 2025 | Best Visual Effects | Dune: Part Two | Won | |
| Online Film Critics Society | January 27, 2025 | Technical Achievement Award: Sound | Dune: Part Two | Honored | |
| Palm Springs International Film Festival | January 2, 2025 | Visionary Award | Denis Villeneuve | Honored | |
| Producers Guild of America Awards | February 8, 2025 | Darryl F. Zanuck Award for Outstanding Producer of Theatrical Motion Pictures | Mary Parent, Cale Boyter, Tanya Lapointe, and Denis Villeneuve | Nominated | |
| San Diego Film Critics Society | December 9, 2024 | Best Picture | Dune: Part Two | Nominated | |
| San Diego Film Critics Society | December 9, 2024 | Best Director | Denis Villeneuve | Won | |
| San Diego Film Critics Society | December 9, 2024 | Best Adapted Screenplay | Denis Villeneuve and Jon Spaihts | Runner-up | |
| San Diego Film Critics Society | December 9, 2024 | Best Ensemble | Dune: Part Two | Nominated | |
| San Diego Film Critics Society | December 9, 2024 | Best Cinematography | Greig Fraser | Nominated | |
| San Diego Film Critics Society | December 9, 2024 | Best Costume Design | Jacqueline West | Nominated | |
| San Diego Film Critics Society | December 9, 2024 | Best Editing | Joe Walker | Nominated | |
| San Diego Film Critics Society | December 9, 2024 | Best Production Design | Patrice Vermette | Runner-up | |
| San Diego Film Critics Society | December 9, 2024 | Best Sound Design | Dune: Part Two | Won | |
| San Diego Film Critics Society | December 9, 2024 | Best Use of Music | Dune: Part Two | Nominated | |
| San Diego Film Critics Society | December 9, 2024 | Best Visual Effects | Dune: Part Two | Runner-up | |
| San Diego Film Critics Society | December 9, 2024 | Best Stunt Choreography | Dune: Part Two | Nominated | |
| San Francisco Bay Area Film Critics Circle | December 15, 2024 | Best Adapted Screenplay | Denis Villeneuve and Jon Spaihts | Nominated | |
| San Francisco Bay Area Film Critics Circle | December 15, 2024 | Best Cinematography | Greig Fraser | Nominated | |
| San Francisco Bay Area Film Critics Circle | December 15, 2024 | Best Production Design | Zsuzsanna Sipos, Patrice Vermette, and Shane Vieau | Nominated | |
| Santa Barbara International Film Festival | February 11, 2025 | Arlington Artist of the Year | Timothée Chalamet | Honored (Note: Also for A Complete Unknown) | |
| Satellite Awards | January 26, 2025 | Best Motion Picture – Drama | Dune: Part Two | Nominated | |
| Satellite Awards | January 26, 2025 | Best Director | Denis Villeneuve | Nominated | |
| Satellite Awards | January 26, 2025 | Best Cinematography | Greig Fraser | Won | |
| Satellite Awards | January 26, 2025 | Best Costume Design | Jacqueline West | Nominated | |
| Satellite Awards | January 26, 2025 | Best Film Editing | Joe Walker | Won | |
| Satellite Awards | January 26, 2025 | Best Original Score | Hans Zimmer | Nominated | |
| Satellite Awards | January 26, 2025 | Best Production Design | Patrice Vermette and Shane Vieau | Nominated | |
| Satellite Awards | January 26, 2025 | Best Sound (Editing and Mixing) | Gareth John, Richard King, Ron Bartlett, and Doug Hemphill | Nominated | |
| Satellite Awards | January 26, 2025 | Best Visual Effects | Paul Lambert, Stephen James, Rhys Salcombe, and Gerd Nefzer | Nominated | |
| Saturn Awards | February 2, 2025 | Best Science Fiction Film | Dune: Part Two | Won | |
| Saturn Awards | February 2, 2025 | Best Film Direction | Denis Villeneuve | Won | |
| Saturn Awards | February 2, 2025 | Best Actor in a Film | Timothée Chalamet | Nominated | |
| Saturn Awards | February 2, 2025 | Best Supporting Actor in a Film | Josh Brolin | Nominated | |
| Saturn Awards | February 2, 2025 | Best Supporting Actor in a Film | Austin Butler | Nominated | |
| Saturn Awards | February 2, 2025 | Best Supporting Actress in a Film | Rebecca Ferguson | Won | |
| Saturn Awards | February 2, 2025 | Best Supporting Actress in a Film | Zendaya | Nominated | |
| Saturn Awards | February 2, 2025 | Best Film Screenwriting | Denis Villeneuve and Jon Spaihts | Nominated | |
| Saturn Awards | February 2, 2025 | Best Film Costume Design | Jacqueline West | Nominated | |
| Saturn Awards | February 2, 2025 | Best Film Editing | Joe Walker | Nominated | |
| Saturn Awards | February 2, 2025 | Best Film Make Up | Donald Mowat, Love Larson, and Eva von Bahr | Nominated | |
| Saturn Awards | February 2, 2025 | Best Film Music | Hans Zimmer | Nominated | |
| Saturn Awards | February 2, 2025 | Best Film Production Design | Patrice Vermette | Won | |
| Saturn Awards | February 2, 2025 | Best Film Visual / Special Effects | Paul Lambert, Stephen James, Rhys Salcombe, and Gerd Nefzer | Won | |
| Screen Actors Guild Awards | February 23, 2025 | Outstanding Action Performance by a Stunt Ensemble in a Motion Picture | Dune: Part Two | Nominated | |
| Seattle Film Critics Society | December 16, 2024 | Best Picture | Dune: Part Two | Nominated | |
| Seattle Film Critics Society | December 16, 2024 | Best Director | Denis Villeneuve | Nominated | |
| Seattle Film Critics Society | December 16, 2024 | Best Ensemble | Dixie Chassay and Francine Maisler (casting directors) | Nominated | |
| Seattle Film Critics Society | December 16, 2024 | Best Cinematography | Greig Fraser | Nominated | |
| Seattle Film Critics Society | December 16, 2024 | Best Costume Design | Jacqueline West | Nominated | |
| Seattle Film Critics Society | December 16, 2024 | Best Editing | Joe Walker | Nominated | |
| Seattle Film Critics Society | December 16, 2024 | Best Production Design | Patrice Vermette and Shane Vieau | Nominated | |
| Seattle Film Critics Society | December 16, 2024 | Best Visual Effects | Paul Lambert, Stephen James, and Rhys Salcombe | Won | |
| Seattle Film Critics Society | December 16, 2024 | Best Action Choreography | Lee Morrison (Stunt Coordinator); Roger Yuan (Fight Choreographer) | Nominated | |
| Seattle Film Critics Society | December 16, 2024 | Villain of the Year | Feyd-Rautha Harkonnen (as portrayed by Austin Butler) | Nominated | |
| Set Decorators Society of America Awards | February 7, 2025 | Best Achievement in Décor/Design of a Fantasy or Science Fiction Film | Shane Vieau and Patrice Vermette | Nominated | |
| SFFILM Awards | December 9, 2024 | Irving M. Levin Award for Film Direction | Denis Villeneuve | Honored | |
| Society of Composers & Lyricists | February 12, 2025 | Outstanding Original Score for a Studio Film | Hans Zimmer | Nominated | |
| St. Louis Film Critics Association | December 15, 2024 | Best Film | Dune: Part Two | Won | |
| St. Louis Film Critics Association | December 15, 2024 | Best Director | Denis Villeneuve | Won | |
| St. Louis Film Critics Association | December 15, 2024 | Best Adapted Screenplay | Denis Villeneuve and Jon Spaihts | Runner-up | |
| St. Louis Film Critics Association | December 15, 2024 | Best Ensemble | Dune: Part Two | Nominated | |
| St. Louis Film Critics Association | December 15, 2024 | Best Cinematography | Greig Fraser | Runner-up | |
| St. Louis Film Critics Association | December 15, 2024 | Best Costume Design | Jacqueline West | Nominated | |
| St. Louis Film Critics Association | December 15, 2024 | Best Editing | Joe Walker | Nominated | |
| St. Louis Film Critics Association | December 15, 2024 | Best Production Design | Zsuzsanna Sipos, Patrice Vermette, and Shane Vieau | Nominated | |
| St. Louis Film Critics Association | December 15, 2024 | Best Score | Hans Zimmer | Nominated | |
| St. Louis Film Critics Association | December 15, 2024 | Best Action Film | Dune: Part Two | Runner-up | |
| St. Louis Film Critics Association | December 15, 2024 | Best Visual Effects | Paul Lambert, Stephen James, Rhys Salcombe, and Gerd Nefzer | Won | |
| St. Louis Film Critics Association | December 15, 2024 | Best Scene | Riding the Sandworm | Nominated | |
| Toronto Film Critics Association | December 15, 2024 | Best Adapted Screenplay | Denis Villeneuve and Jon Spaihts | Runner-up | |
| Vancouver Film Critics Circle | February 18, 2025 | Best Director | Denis Villeneuve | Won | |
| Visual Effects Society Awards | February 11, 2025 | Outstanding Visual Effects in a Photoreal Feature | Paul Lambert, Brice Parker, Stephen James, Rhys Salcombe, and Gerd Nefzer | Nominated | |
| Visual Effects Society Awards | February 11, 2025 | Outstanding Created Environment in a Photoreal Feature | Daniel Rhein, Daniel Anton Fernandez, Marc James Austin, and Christopher Anciaume (for "The Arrakeen Basin") | Won | |
| Visual Effects Society Awards | February 11, 2025 | Outstanding Effects Simulations in a Photoreal Feature | Nicholas Papworth, Sandy la Tourelle, Lisa Nolan, and Christopher Phillips (for "Atomic Explosions and Wormriding") | Won | |
| Visual Effects Society Awards | February 11, 2025 | Outstanding Compositing & Lighting in a Feature | Christopher Rickard, Francesco Dell'Anna, Paul Chapman, and Ryan Wing (for "Wormriding, Geidi Prime, and the Final Battle") | Won | |
| Visual Effects Society Awards | February 11, 2025 | Outstanding Virtual Cinematography in a CG Project | Greig Fraser, Xin Steve Guo, Sandra Murta, and Ben Wiggs (for "Arrakis") | Won | |
| Visual Effects Society Awards | February 11, 2025 | Outstanding Model in a Photoreal or Animated Project | Andrew Hodgson, Timothy Russell, Erik Lehmann, and Louie Cho (for "The Harkonnen Harvester") | Nominated | |
| Visual Effects Society Awards | February 11, 2025 | Emerging Technology Award | Ben Kent, Guillaume Gales, Mairead Grogan, and Johanna Barbier (for "Nuke CopyCat") | Nominated | |
| Washington D.C. Area Film Critics Association | December 8, 2024 | Best Director | Denis Villeneuve | Nominated | |
| Washington D.C. Area Film Critics Association | December 8, 2024 | Best Adapted Screenplay | Denis Villeneuve and Jon Spaihts | Nominated | |
| Washington D.C. Area Film Critics Association | December 8, 2024 | Best Acting Ensemble | Dune: Part Two | Nominated | |
| Washington D.C. Area Film Critics Association | December 8, 2024 | Best Cinematography | Greig Fraser | Nominated | |
| Washington D.C. Area Film Critics Association | December 8, 2024 | Best Editing | Joe Walker | Won (Note: Tied with Sean Baker for Anora) | |
| Washington D.C. Area Film Critics Association | December 8, 2024 | Best Production Design | Patrice Vermette and Shane Vieau | Nominated | |
| Washington D.C. Area Film Critics Association | December 8, 2024 | Best Stunts | Dune: Part Two | Nominated | |
| Winter IndieWire Honors | December 5, 2024 | Visionary Award | Denis Villeneuve | Honored | |
| World Soundtrack Awards | October 17, 2024 | Film Composer of the Year | Hans Zimmer | Nominated (Note: Also for The Creator) | |
| World Soundtrack Awards | October 17, 2024 | Public Choice Award | Dune: Part Two | Nominated | |
| Writers Guild of America Awards | February 15, 2025 | Best Adapted Screenplay | Denis Villeneuve and Jon Spaihts | Nominated | |

== See also ==
- List of accolades received by Dune (2021 film)
