= Cello Metal =

Cello Metal may refer to:

- Cello metal, a subgenre of heavy metal music
- Cello Metal (album), a 2015 album by Tina Guo
