= Ray of Light (Tina Guo album) =

Studio album by Tina Guo
- Released: March 14, 2014
- Recorded: 2014
- Studio: Guo Industries
- Genre: Classical crossover, Neo-classical Metal
- Length: 25.12
- Label: Self Released (Guo Industries)

Tina Guo chronology
Eternity (2013)	Ray of Light (2014)	A Cello Christmas (2014)

Ray of Light is the fourth studio album by Tina Guo. It was released on March 14, 2014. Guo wrote the song "Ray of Light" within this album for Ray Armando Morabito, back in 2013.

== Track listing ==
1. Letter to You 2:33
2. A Love Story 2:35
3. Midnight Sun 2:00
4. Could It Be 4:16
5. Goodnight 0:59
6. Fantasies 1:16
7. Forest Dreams 0:53
8. January in Italy 2:34
9. Love Conquers All 2:43
10. Prelude Fantasies for Electric Cello 2:54
11. More Than Words 3:51
12. Ray of Light 0:50
13. Trio for Lawnmower and 2 Cellos 1:12
14. Unity 3:26
15. Genesis Rising 3:10

== Release history ==
Country	Date	Format	Label	Catalogue
USA	March 4, 2014	CD, digital download	Self Released	
