= Game On! (album) =

Studio album by Tina Guo
- Released: 10 February 2017
- Recorded: 2017
- Studio: Guo Industries
- Genre: Modern classical, symphonic rock, symphonic metal
- Length: 58.53
- Label: Sony Masterworks
- Producer: Steve Mazzaro, Tina Guo

Tina Guo chronology
Inner Passion (2016)	Game On! (2017)	Dies Irae (2021)

Game On! is the eighth studio album by Tina Guo and it is themed around video game music. It was recorded in Los Angeles and released on 10 February 2017. It also featured the Budapest Symphony Orchestra and the vocals from Kvitrafn.

== Track listing ==
1. "The Legends of Zelda" – 5:58
2. "Final Fantasy VII" – 6:34
3. "Chrono Trigger" – 2:51
4. "World of Warcraft" – 5:03
5. "Skyrim" – 3:42
6. "Uncharted - Nate's Theme" – 3:11
7. "Super Mario Bros" – 3:33
8. "Pokémon" – 3:04
9. "Journey" – 5:09
10. "The Witcher 3: Wild Hunt" – 2:48
11. "Halo" – 4:13
12. "Metal Gear Solid" – 4:25
13. "Call of Duty:Modern Warfare 2" – 3:51
14. "Tetris" - 4:14

== Release history ==
Country	Date	Format	Label	Catalogue
United States	10 February 2017	CD, digital download	Sony Masterworks	
