= Inner Passion =

Studio album by Peter Kater and Tina Guo
- Released: 26 February 2016
- Recorded: 2015
- Genre: New Age, Modern Classical, Improvisational
- Label: Hearts of Space Records

Peter Kater and Tina Guo chronology
Cello Metal (2015)	Inner Passion (2016)	Game On! (2017)

Inner Passion is the 2016 duet album by pianist Peter Kater and cellist Tina Guo. The album was fully improvised upon the musicians' first musical meeting. It debuted at number four on the Billboard New Age Albums chart. Inner Passion received a Grammy Award nomination for Best New Age Album at the 59th Annual Grammy Awards.

== Track listing ==
No.	Title	Length
1.	"First Embrace"	6:00
2.	"Lotus Moon"	5:09
3.	"Self Discovery"	5:04
4.	"River of the Sun"	4:38
5.	"Within Silence"	9:54
6.	"Heart to Heart"	5:39
7.	"Spaces Above"	5:56
8.	"Spirits Entwined"	7:00
9.	"Inner Passion"	1:12
