= Eternity (Tina Guo album) =

Studio album by Tina Guo
- Released: May 14, 2013
- Recorded: 2013
- Studio: Guo Industries
- Genre: Neoclassical metal, Symphonic Metal
- Length: 38.40
- Label: Self Released

Tina Guo chronology
The Journey (2011)	Eternity (2013)	Ray of Light (2014)

Eternity is the third studio album by Tina Guo. It was released on May 14, 2013.

== Track listing ==
1. My Soul Awaits 4:25
2. Sanctus 2:32
3. Battle Of Zharafin 1:33
4. Ray Of Love 2:49
5. Ghost Of War 2:11
6. The Port 2:55
7. Apocalypse 3:09
8. Darkness 2:50
9. So This Is Love 2:44
10. New Beginnings 2:02
11. To Be In Your Arms Again 4:02
12. Kiss The Sky 3:03
13. Breathe Me In 4:29

== Release history ==
Country	Date	Format	Label	Catalogue
China	March 4, 2013	CD, digital download	Self Released	
