= The Journey (Tina Guo album) =

Studio album by Tina Guo
- Released: December 12, 2011
- Recorded: 2011
- Studio: Guo Industries
- Genre: Pop, Classical, New age
- Length: 52:21
- Label: Convexe Entertainment

Tina Guo chronology
Autumn Winds (2011)	The Journey (2011)	Eternity (2013)

The Journey is the second studio album by Tina Guo. It was released on December 12, 2011. The album featured the Budapest Symphony Orchestra and the composers from Nuno Malo, Frédéric Chopin and Astor Piazzolla.

== Track listing ==
1. Lament 4:20
2. Introduction and Polonaise Brillante in C Major, for Cello and Piano, Op. 3 9:06
3. Le Grand Tango 11:16
4. Winter Star 5:10
5. Winter Starlight 5:09
6. The Awakening 5:06
7. Lacrimosa 1:59
8. Sunlight 1:05
9. The Journey Home 2:54
10. Forbidden City 3:59
11. Queen Bee 2:17

== Release history ==
Country	Date	Format	Label	Catalogue
Canada	December 12, 2011	CD, digital download	Self-released	76
