= Dune: Part Two =

2024 film by Denis Villeneuve

- Theatrical release poster
- Directed by: Denis Villeneuve
- Screenplay by: Denis Villeneuve; Jon Spaihts
- Based on: Dune by Frank Herbert
- Produced by: Mary Parent; Cale Boyter; Patrick McCormick; Tanya Lapointe; Denis Villeneuve
- Starring: Timothée Chalamet; Zendaya; Rebecca Ferguson; Josh Brolin; Austin Butler; Florence Pugh; Dave Bautista; Christopher Walken; Léa Seydoux; Stellan Skarsgård; Charlotte Rampling; Javier Bardem
- Cinematography: Greig Fraser
- Edited by: Joe Walker
- Music by: Hans Zimmer
- Production company: Legendary Pictures
- Distributed by: Warner Bros. Pictures
- Release dates: February 6, 2024 (Auditorio Nacional); March 1, 2024 (United States)
- Running time: 165 minutes
- Country: United States
- Language: English
- Budget: $190 million
- Box office: $715 million

Dune: Part Two is a 2024 American epic space opera film directed by Denis Villeneuve, from a screenplay he wrote with Jon Spaihts. A sequel to Dune (2021), it is the second film in a two-part adaptation of Frank Herbert's 1965 science fiction novel Dune, and is the second of a trilogy of films developed by Legendary Pictures. Timothée Chalamet leads an ensemble cast as Paul Atreides, an exiled monarch who allies with the Fremen to overthrow House Harkonnen as part of a quest to become a messianic figure. Villeneuve produced Dune: Part Two with his wife and business partner Tanya Lapointe, Mary Parent and Cale Boyter of Legendary Pictures, and Patrick McCormick. Funding came from a distribution agreement between Legendary and Warner Bros. Pictures, as well as tax subsidies from Hungarian, Jordanian, and Abu Dhabi governments.

Parent and Boyter pursued the idea of a Dune film after obtaining rights to the novel in 2016. Villeneuve's deal with Legendary mandated the book's adaptation in two films. A sequel was approved in October 2021, and production started almost immediately. Villeneuve intended for Dune: Part Two to explore Paul's evolution into an increasingly unscrupulous character. Principal photography took place in Hungary, Italy, Jordan, Namibia, and the United Arab Emirates from July to December 2022. Creative decisions exemplified the production's expanded scope and changes in visual presentation, such as shooting partially in black-and-white infrared light. Hans Zimmer composed the film's soundtrack, building upon his earlier work in Dune.

Dune: Part Two premiered in Mexico City on February 6, 2024, and was released globally the week of March 1. The film was a critical and commercial success; it became 2024's seventh highest-grossing film at the box office with $715 million, and was chosen as one of the best ten films of the year by the American Film Institute. Critics praised Dune: Part Two for its onscreen world and acting, but debated about the writing. The film was nominated for five awards at the 97th Academy Awards (including Best Picture), winning two, and received numerous accolades mostly for technical achievement. A sequel based on Herbert's 1969 novel Dune Messiah, Dune: Part Three, is scheduled for release on December 18, 2026.

== Plot ==
Following the defeat of House Atreides by House Harkonnen, (Note: As depicted in Dune (2021)) Princess Irulan—daughter of the Padishah Emperor, Shaddam Corrino IV—records in her journal her father's betrayal of the Atreides. On the planet Arrakis, a Fremen tribe led by Stilgar accompanies Paul Atreides and his pregnant Bene Gesserit mother Lady Jessica to Sietch Tabr. Some Fremen suspect they are spies, while Stilgar and others see signs of the prophecy that a mother and son from the "Outer World" will bring prosperity to Arrakis.

After Paul defeats Jamis in a duel, the Fremen accept Paul. Stilgar commands Jessica to succeed Sietch Tabr's dying Reverend Mother by ritually drinking the normally fatal Water of Life. Jessica uses her Bene Gesserit training to transmute the poisonous liquid and survive, inheriting the memories of past Reverend Mothers. The liquid prematurely awakens the mind of her unborn daughter, Alia, allowing Jessica to communicate with her. Chani and her friend Shishakli correctly deduce that the prophecy is a Bene Gesserit myth fabricated to manipulate the Fremen. Nonetheless, Chani begins to respect Paul after he declares that he only seeks to fight alongside the Fremen, not rule them.

Paul and Chani fall in love as he immerses himself in Fremen culture—learning their language, becoming a Fedaykin fighter, riding a sandworm, and raiding Harkonnen spice-harvesting operations. Paul adopts the Fremen names Usul (Note: transl. "the strength of a pillar") and Muad'Dib. (Note: transl. "kangaroo mouse") Due to the spice raids, Baron Vladimir Harkonnen replaces his older nephew Rabban as the ruler of Arrakis with his favored nephew, Feyd-Rautha. Lady Margot Fenring is sent by the Bene Gesserit to evaluate Feyd-Rautha as a prospective Kwisatz Haderach.

Jessica travels south to unite with Fremen fundamentalists who strongly believe in the prophecy. Paul remains in the north, fearful that his visions of an apocalyptic holy war will come to pass if he goes south as a messiah. During a raid on a smuggler spice harvester, Paul reunites with his mentor Gurney Halleck, who leads Paul to House Atreides' hidden atomic warheads. Paul is forced to journey south after Feyd-Rautha unleashes a devastating attack on Sietch Tabr and kills Shishakli. Upon arrival in the south, Paul drinks the Water of Life and falls into a coma. Jessica uses The Voice to compel Chani to save Paul; she gives Paul a mixture of her tears with the Water of Life, which awakens him. With his emerging prescience, Paul perceives countless possible futures and identifies a narrow path to victory, along with a vision of an adult Alia on a water-covered Arrakis. He also discovers that his mother is the Baron's daughter and that the Bene Gesserit orchestrated her union with Duke Leto Atreides to merge Harkonnen and Atreides bloodlines in their plan to create the Kwisatz Haderach.

Paul declares himself the messianic figure Lisan al Gaib after gaining the southern Fremen's support by demonstrating his ability to know their deepest thoughts. He threatens to destroy the spice fields, forcing Emperor Shaddam to come to Arrakis with Irulan and his elite Sardaukar soldiers. The Fremen launch an offensive using atomic weapons and sandworms, overpowering the Sardaukar. Gurney leads a Fremen assault on Arrakeen, killing Rabban.

After capturing the Imperial court and executing Vladimir Harkonnen, Paul challenges Shaddam for the throne and, to Chani's dismay, demands to marry Irulan. More Great Houses (which were secretly summoned by the Baron) arrive in orbit but Paul threatens to destroy the spice fields if they intervene. Feyd-Rautha, who volunteers to be Shaddam's champion, is killed by Paul in a duel. Irulan agrees to marry Paul on the condition that he spare her father. Shaddam surrenders but the Houses reject Paul's ascendancy, so he orders the Fremen to attack the orbiting fleet. As Stilgar leads the Fremen onto the captured Sardaukar ships, Jessica and Alia reflect on the beginning of Paul's holy war. A devastated Chani refuses to bow to Paul and departs alone on a sandworm.

== Cast ==
- Timothée Chalamet as Paul Atreides, the exiled Duke of Arrakis and head of House Atreides who sides with the Fremen to overthrow the tyrannical House Harkonnen
- Zendaya as Chani, a young and rebellious Fremen warrior who is Paul's love interest
- Rebecca Ferguson as Lady Jessica, Paul's Bene Gesserit mother and concubine to Paul's late father and predecessor, Leto Atreides
- Josh Brolin as Gurney Halleck, the former military leader of House Atreides and Paul's mentor and friend
- Austin Butler as Feyd-Rautha, Baron Vladimir Harkonnen's youngest nephew and heir ("na-Baron") to House Harkonnen
- Florence Pugh as Princess Irulan, the Emperor's eldest daughter, heiress presumptive and Bene Gesserit initiate.
- Dave Bautista as Rabban, nephew of Baron Vladimir Harkonnen and older brother of Feyd-Rautha
- Christopher Walken as Emperor Shaddam IV, the Padishah Emperor of the Known Universe and head of House Corrino
- Léa Seydoux as Lady Margot Fenring, a Bene Gesserit and close friend of the Emperor
- Souheila Yacoub as Shishakli, a Fremen warrior and Chani's friend
- Stellan Skarsgård as Baron Vladimir Harkonnen, the head of House Harkonnen and former steward of Arrakis, who is an enemy of the Atreides and the uncle of Feyd-Rautha and Rabban
- Charlotte Rampling as Reverend Mother Mohiam, a Bene Gesserit Reverend Mother and the Emperor's Truthsayer
- Javier Bardem as Stilgar, the leader of the Fremen tribe at Sietch Tabr
- Alison Halstead as the Maker Keeper, a keeper of the Water of Life in the Fremen tribe.

Anya Taylor-Joy makes an uncredited cameo appearance as Alia Atreides, Paul's unborn sister who appears in his premonitions. She also has the ability to communicate to Jessica in utero. Babs Olusanmokun and Roger Yuan play Jamis and Lieutenant Lanville, continuing their work from Dune. Stephen McKinley Henderson filmed scenes as Thufir Hawat, while Tim Blake Nelson portrayed an undisclosed character, but their scenes were omitted from the final cut. Both actors were given a "Special Thanks" credit by Villeneuve.

== Production ==
=== Development ===
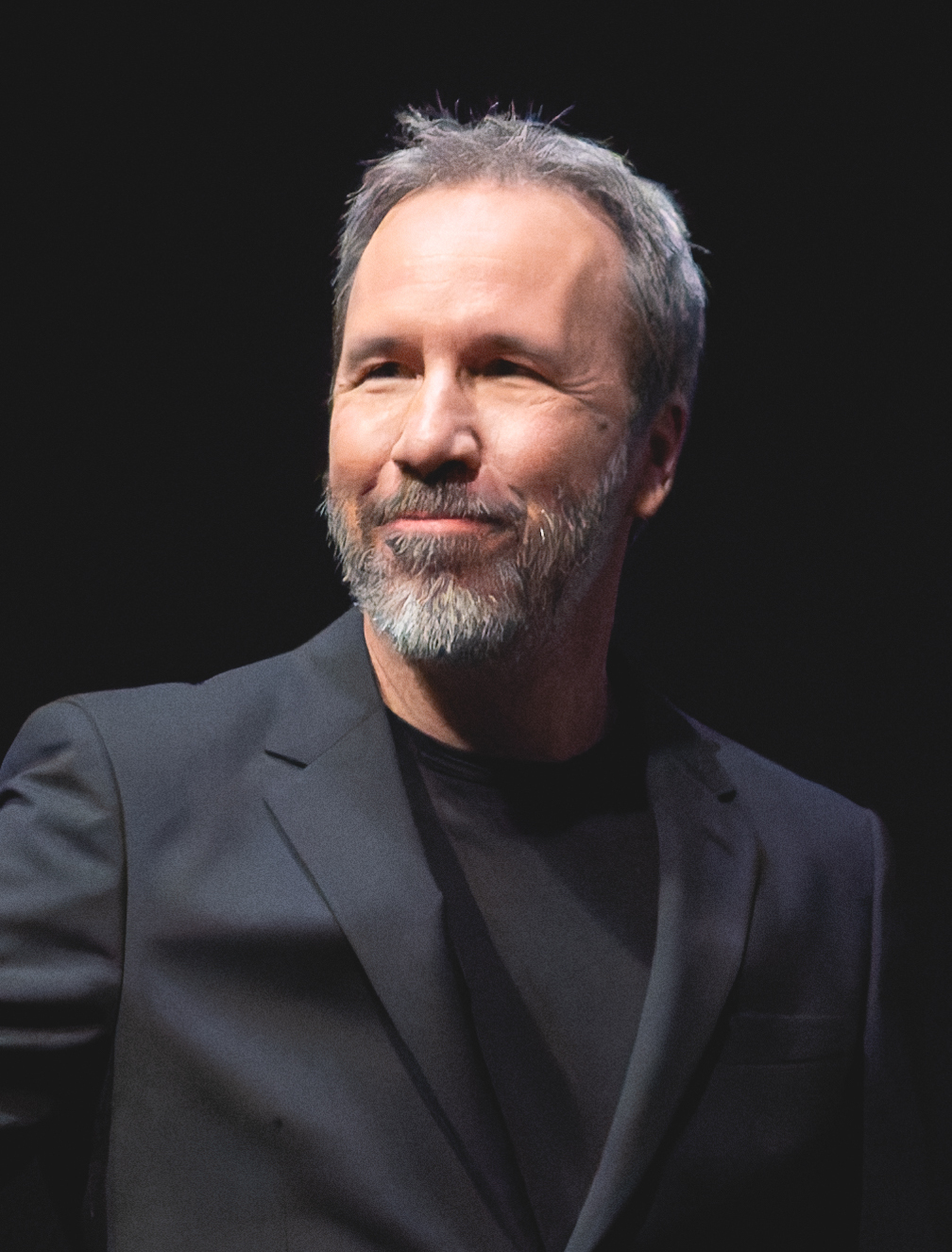
Denis Villeneuve in 2024

In 2011, Legendary Pictures executive Mary Parent and her producer Cale Boyter purchased the film rights to Frank Herbert's science fiction novel Dune (1965) from the Herbert estate. It took until late 2016 to complete the transfer of ownership as a result of development hurdles related, but not limited, to turnover and changes in legal representation. Parent then began considering a director from a shortlist of filmmakers including Denis Villeneuve. She pursued Villeneuve after coming across a magazine transcript of his interview at the 73rd Venice International Film Festival, where he stated creating a Dune film was a lifelong dream. They started negotiating toward the end of the year, and by January 2017, Villeneuve was signed to a multi-picture deal as director, which mandated the novel's adaptation in two films. Villeneuve said he would've rejected a one-picture deal as he believed the book was too dense to be adapted in a single film.

Legendary released Dune in the US on October 22, 2021 through a distribution pact with Warner Bros. Pictures. (Note: The deal stipulated that Legendary Pictures provide 80% of funding for Dune, with WarnerMedia covering the remaining share. This arrangement continued for Dune: Part Two despite the preexisting Legendary–Warner Bros. deal expiring, thanks to an exemption clause in Legendary's distribution agreement with Sony Pictures, which came into effect in November 2022.) The film saw immediate box office success, prompting the studios to commission Dune: Part Two the following week. Warner Bros. coordinated a simultaneous release campaign that distributed Dune in theaters and through HBO Max for one month, which drew strong negative reactions from Legendary executives and Villeneuve over concerns about the film's profit-making viability. Hence, the studios approved Dune: Part Two guaranteeing a 45-day rollout in theaters, brokered by Villeneuve as a condition of their agreement. Given that they planned to release Dune: Part Two within two years, the film went into production almost immediately. Villeneuve and screenwriter Eric Roth were already working on the script to a sequel in the time leading up to Dune's launch.

=== Writing ===
Villeneuve described Dune: Part Two as an "epic war movie" grounded in the relationship between Paul and Chani. The Writers Guild of America West (WGAW) credits the director and Jon Spaihts as the writers of the film's completed script. Roth and Craig Mazin are credited for "additional literary material", which the WGAW designates to screenwriters who contribute to scripts in a non-authorship capacity. Roth developed an early treatment, and Mazin was tasked with refining the screenplay within a month.

Villeneuve intended the film's Paul to become unscrupulous to indicate a cautionary tale about his transformation into the long-prophesied messiah, similar to Herbert's treatment in the books. His main approach was to expand Chani's role in the story by presenting her as a skeptic of the prophecy, as such that Paul's character arc unravels to viewers from her perspective. Accentuating this effect is their romance. The end of Paul's arc therefore marks the point at which Chani emerges as the protagonist. It also signifies, according to Villeneuve, the story's shift to a tragedy because "[Paul] loves the people, and their culture, and he will betray what he loves in order to rule, to get power." The director took inspiration from Katsuhiro Otomo's animated film Akira (1988) to plot Paul's arc.

The main characters introduced in Dune: Part Two are Princess Irulan, Emperor Shaddam IV, Lady Margot Fenring, and Feyd-Rautha, Paul's nemesis. The film's Irulan fulfills the role of the in-universe narrator, although not as prominently featured as her book counterpart. She is the first to suspect that Paul is in hiding rather than dead. On the other hand, Fenring has a substantially larger presence as a result of the film story's emphasis on the Bene Gesserit. Villeneuve described Feyd-Rautha as a "Olympic sword master mixed with a psychotic serial killer". Dune: Part Two frames him as a foil for Paul. In appearance, he is bald, chiseled, and meant to exude sex appeal unlike the other Harkonnen. This differs from the novel's portrayal of Feyd-Rautha as a sullen, dark-haired teenage boy.

One challenge the filmmakers faced was their treatment of Alia as, despite being an important character in Dune canon, she is no more than a few years old in the original novel. In response, Villeneuve abridged the novel's chain of events to escalate tension in the plot and establish both the circumstance of Alia's birth and the Water of Life's perceived power. She features in Dune: Part Two as an adult in one of Paul's dreams though does not appear in real time.

=== Casting ===
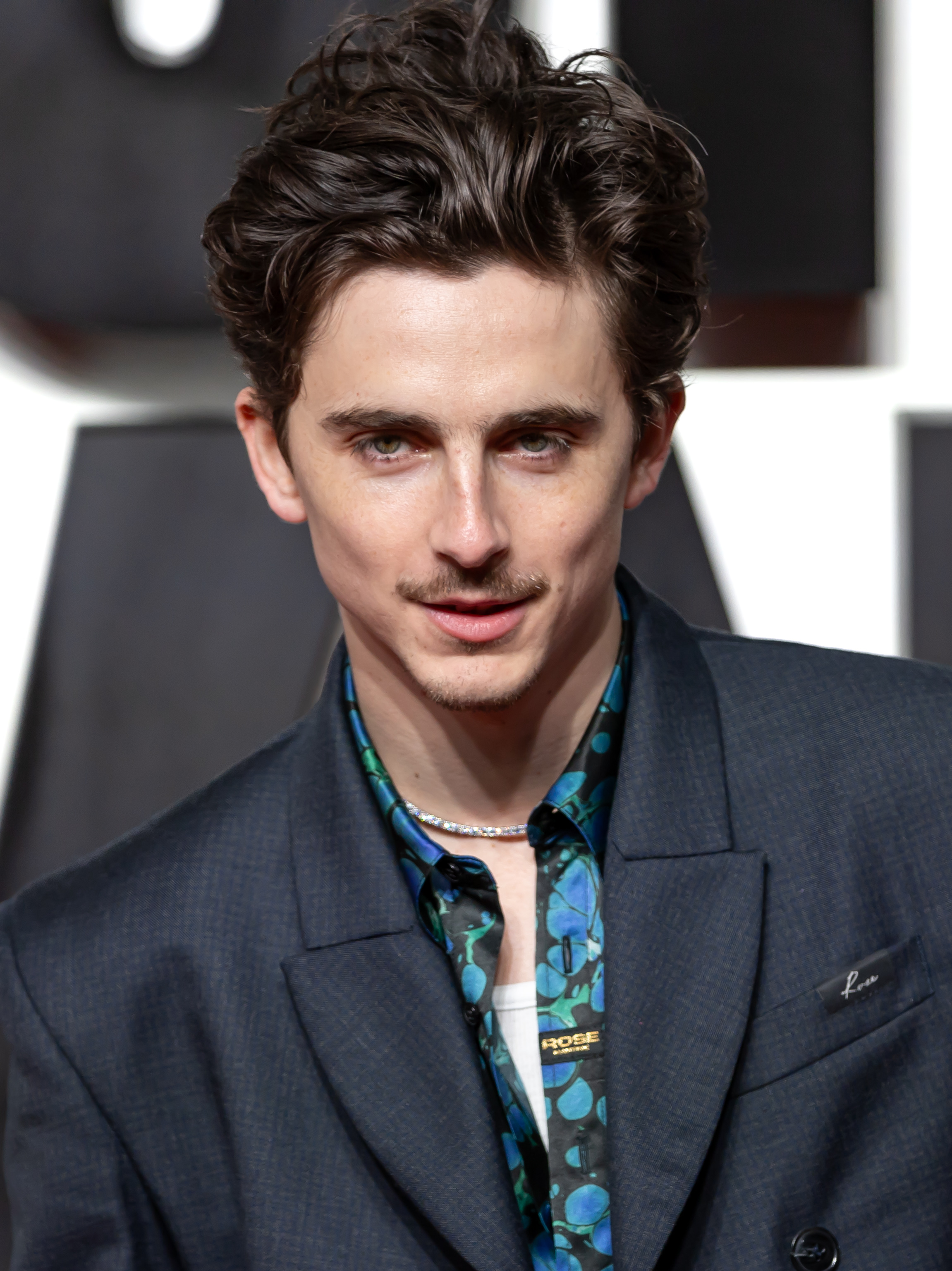
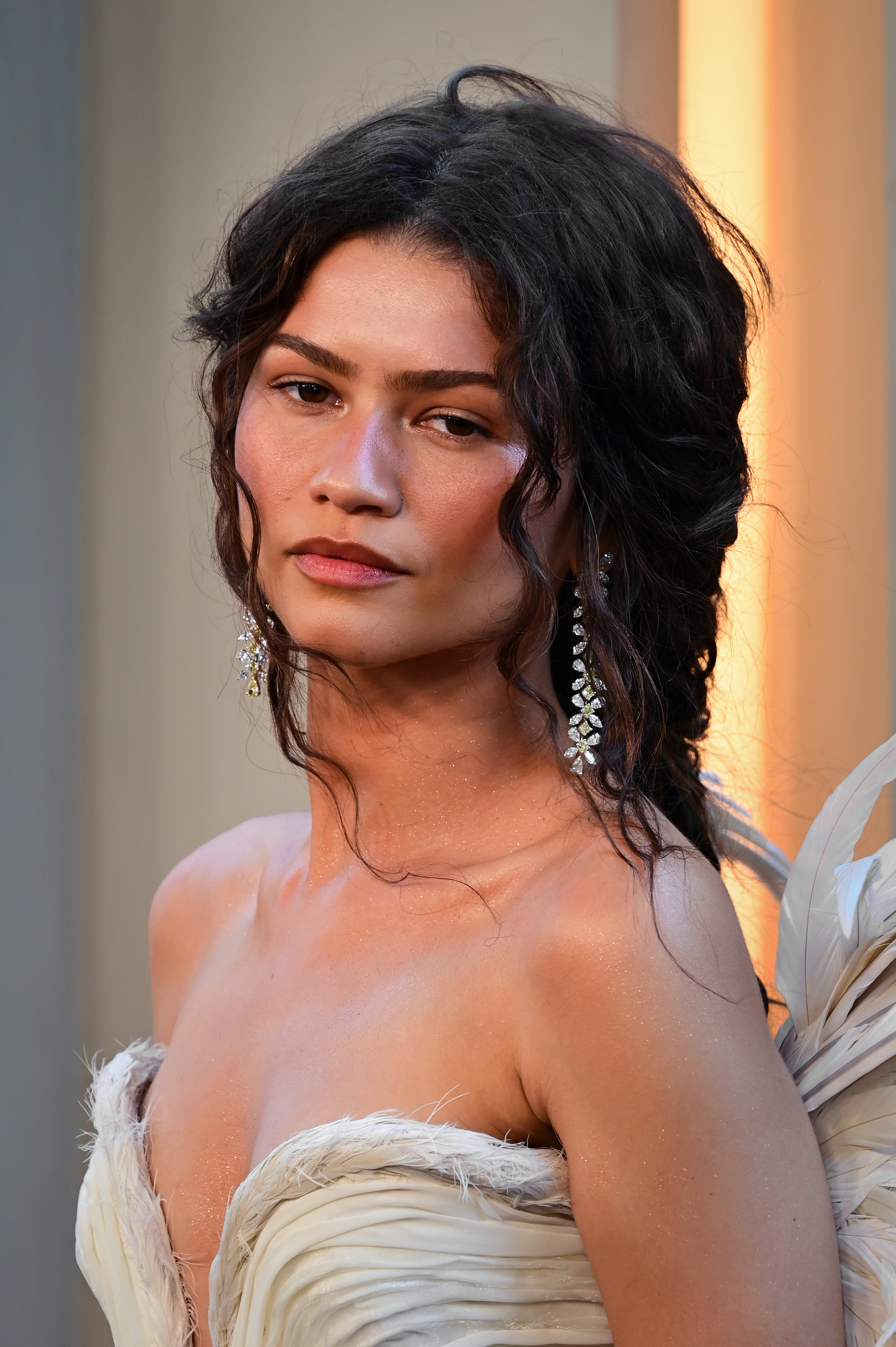
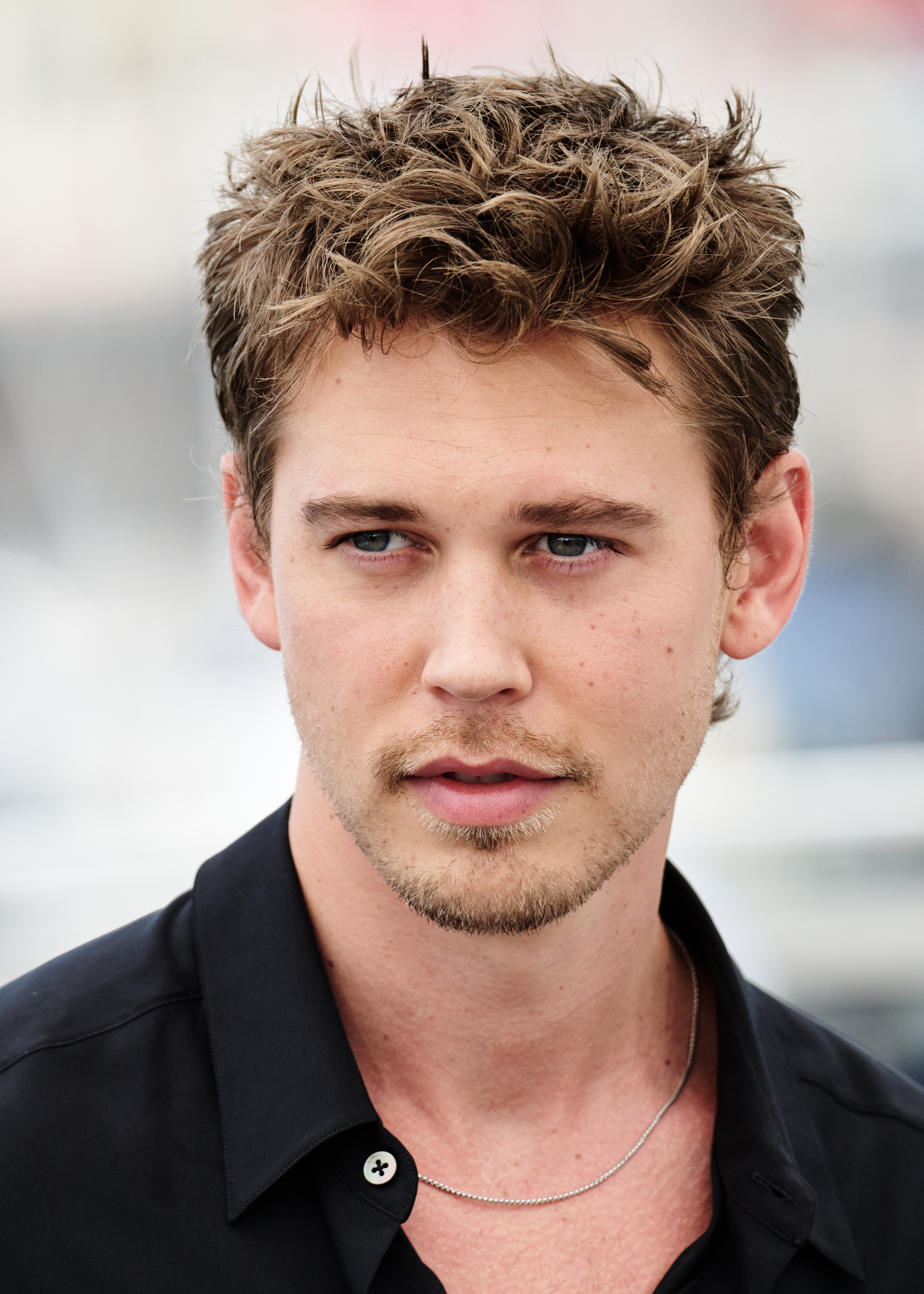
Left to right: Timothee Chalamet (pictured in 2025), Zendaya (2026), and Austin Butler (2025)

An ensemble of twelve actors received top billing in Dune: Part Two, the majority reprising roles from Dune. The actors trained with David and Jessie Peterson—a husband-and-wife team of linguists—to master Chakobsa, the film's constructed language spoken by the Fremen peoples. Dialect coach Fabien Enjalric was brought on to develop an individual's speech to sound as if they were a native speaker.

Of the ensemble's new actors, Florence Pugh and Austin Butler were the first significant casting choices. Butler was signed as Feyd-Rautha without an audition, having just completed filming for the Baz Luhrmann-directed biopic Elvis (2022). To play Feyd-Rautha, he trained in knife-fighting and improved his physique with a four month-long fitness regimen. Butler modeled Feyd-Rautha's speaking voice after Skarsgård's Baron under the notion that Feyd-Rautha would have adopted certain traits from his uncle while growing up around him. Butler cited Gary Oldman and Heath Ledger as influences upon his performance.

Villeneuve felt Christopher Walken exhibited a "vulnerability and humanity" as Shaddam IV, his first role in four years. Walken spent about three weeks on the set shooting his scenes. By July 2022, Léa Seydoux and Souheila Yacoub had rounded out the principal cast. Dune: Part Two was Seydoux's first mainstream film since No Time to Die (2021); she had been most interested in the prospect of working with Villeneuve. Producers kept Anya Taylor-Joy's cameo as Alia discreet until the London premiere of the film in February 2024. Taylor-Joy had met with Villeneuve for another part in Dune: Part Two. Her obligations to Furiosa: A Mad Max Saga (2024) nearly caused a scheduling conflict, given that it was filming around the same time, but Villeneuve struck a deal with the studios to facilitate her casting in a smaller role.

=== Filming ===
Principal photography began two days ahead of schedule on July 18, 2022 in Budapest, Hungary, which remained the film's base of production. A two-day pre-shooting session preceded the production in early July, taking place at the Brion tomb, located within a municipal cemetery in Altivole, Italy. The site doubled for the imperial court in scenes featuring Irulan and Shaddam. Filmmakers scouted gardens in Florence and Rome beforehand. Dune: Part Two's Budapest shoot was staged mostly from constructed sets at Hungexpo, a 103,000 sq ft (9,600 m^{2}) convention center, and Origo Studios; the production required considerably more space for sets than Dune. Elsewhere, filming occurred at the Varga Márton Múzeum's Japanese gardens and the Pantheon of the Workers' Movement, a mausoleum in the Fiume Road Graveyard.

Production designer Patrice Vermette and manager Duncan Broadfoot spent several weeks scouting deserts in Jordan and the United Arab Emirates before filming started. They chose the Liwa Oasis in Abu Dhabi for footage among the sand dunes, whereas in Jordan, filmmakers captured landscape shots of canyons and other rock formations, such as Wadi Rum, al-Siq, and Dabet Hanut. Certain scenes were staged during golden hour, a phenomenon of daytime whereby the Sun's low altitude relative to the horizon produces reddish light. In total, it took around two months for the camera crew to complete filming in West Asia. A 20-person second unit shot footage of coastal desert in Namibia on the final day of principal photography, and, after five-and-a-half months, filming wrapped on December 12, 2022. Dune: Part Two qualified for tax rebates of at least 25% on in-state costs from the Hungarian, Jordanian, and the municipal Abu Dhabi governments.

Selected filming locations

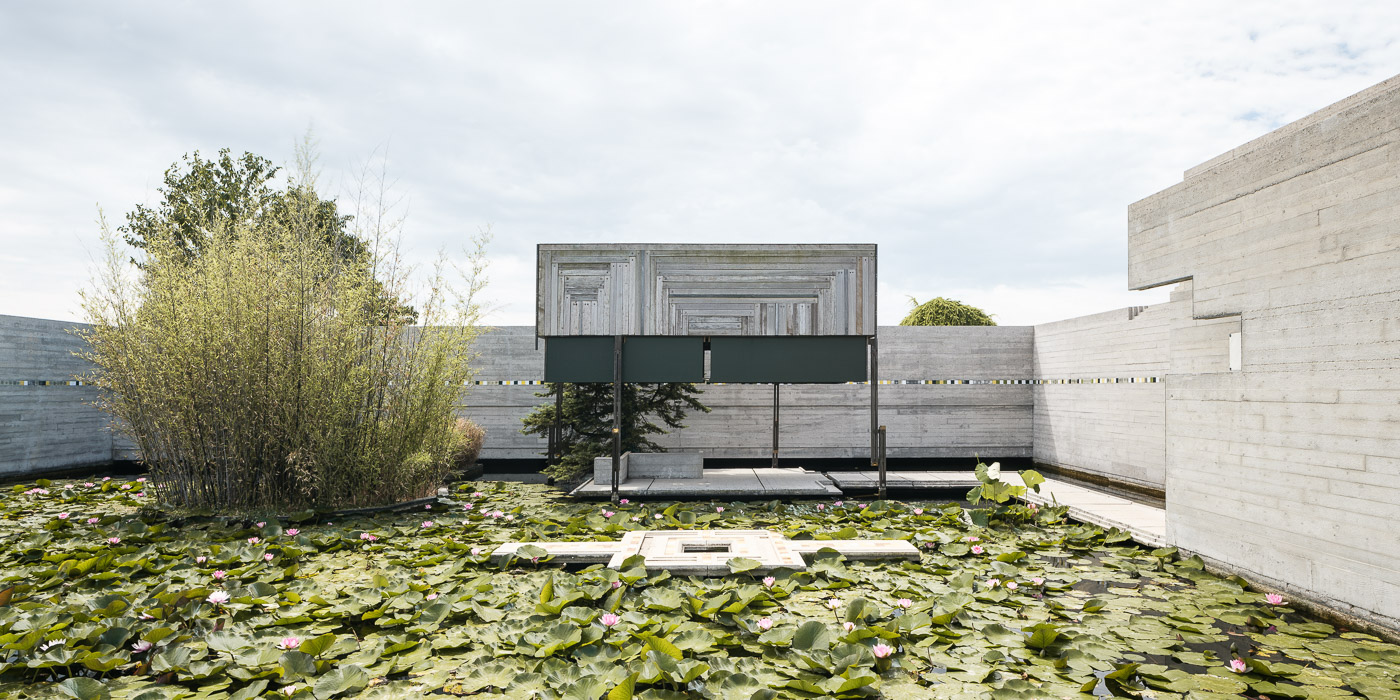
Meditation pavillion of the Brion tomb, Italy (pictured in 2021)

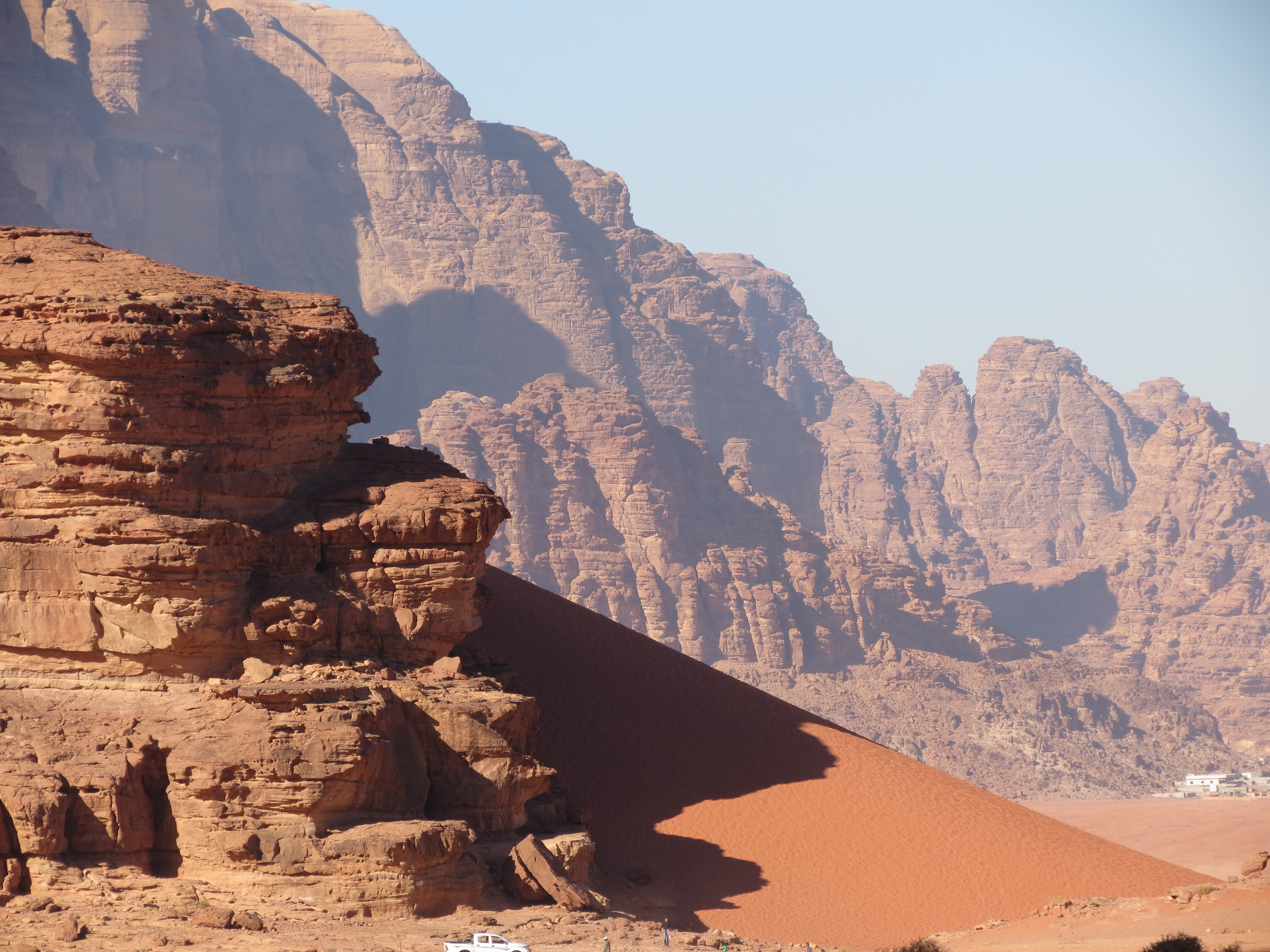
Shot of Wadi Rum, Jordan (2012)

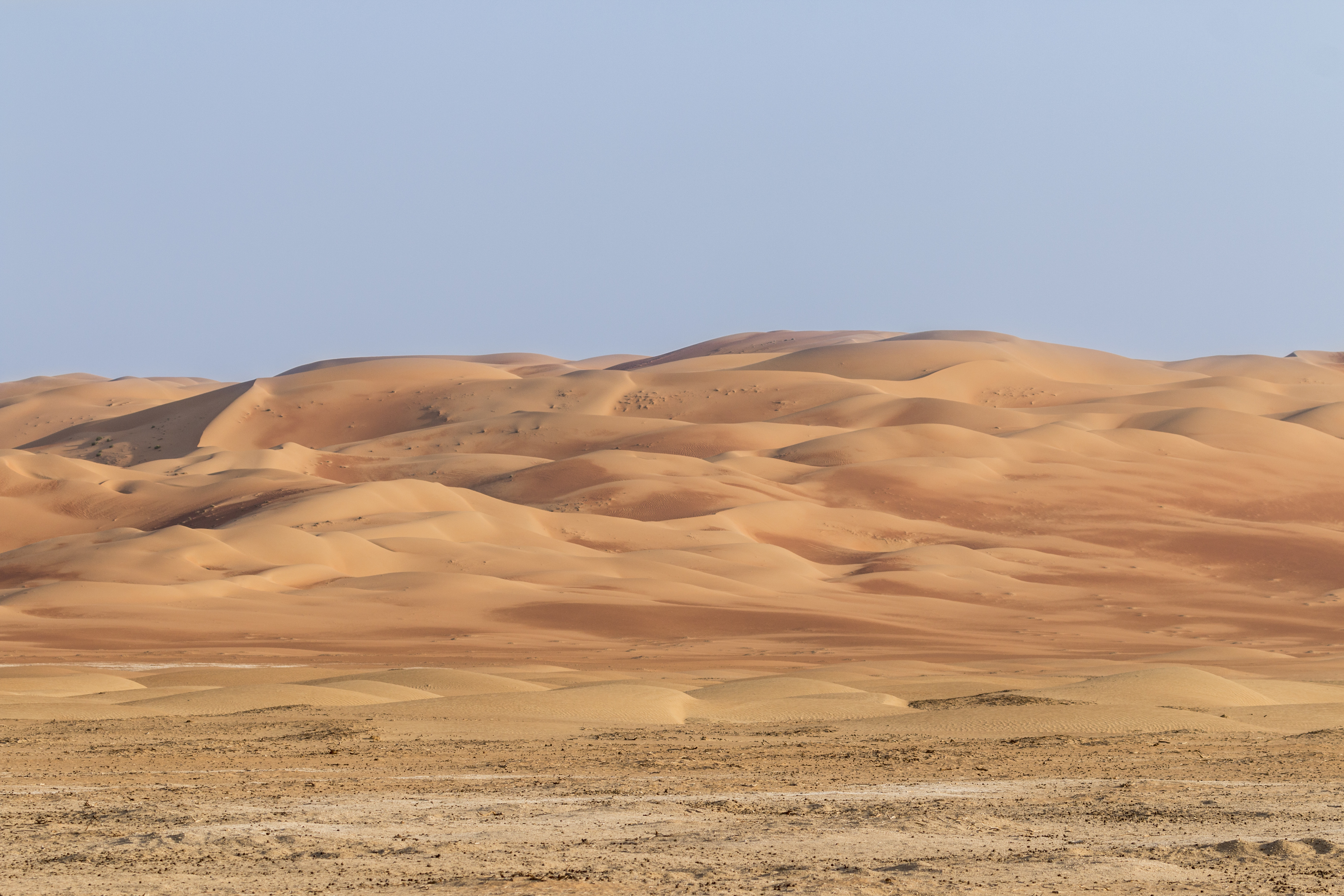
Panoramic view of sand dunes near Liwa Oasis, United Arab Emirates (2018)

=== Cinematography ===
Infrared photographic still of Butler in character as Feyd-Rautha. One reason the filmmakers shot in infrared light was to establish Feyd-Rautha as a menacing and physically imposing character.

Director of photography Greig Fraser called Dune: Part Two, the filmmaker's second project with Villeneuve, his most difficult undertaking due to the film's scale. Villeneuve's instruction for the sets was to "challenge ourselves and make sure we expanded our language and brought a feeling of novelty." In the three months of pre-production, they planned to use camera movements as a means of illustrating Paul's evolution as a character. Fraser relied on spherical lenses to produce the onscreen world.

Once filming began, the crew tested the refurbished Soviet lenses from Iron Glass that Fraser had used for The Batman (2022), but they were considered inadequate for the needs of the production. Fraser instead obtained nine Iron Glass MKII Prime lenses in 37mm, 58mm, and 85mm. The choice of lens was contingent on the type of scene portrayed. Fraser used Moviecam, which was sharp in texture, to photograph arena fights and the sandworm sequence, and Iron Glass and Optica Elite Prime lenses for Paul-centric and landscape scenes as the imaging produced was soft. Production filmed Dune: Part Two in 1.43:1 aspect ratio with an Arri Alexa 65 camera and, to a lesser extent, Alexa LF and Mini LF cameras. The setup, says Fraser, lent more options to execute the film's IMAX cut.

Problems arose during the shooting of the film's opening sequence, wherein Harkonnen troops ambush Paul and Lady Jessica. It was filmed in twelve locations because the scene's aesthetics could not be sufficiently conveyed with the logistics of a single site. Preparation lasted months, and shots were timed with a combination of drone footage, lidar scans, photogrammetry, and 3D graphics software Unreal Engine. Some of the production coincided with a partial solar eclipse on October 25, 2022, which filmmakers used as a backdrop. Villeneuve neither anticipated shooting during an actual event nor conceived the scene within the setting of an eclipse, but made the changes to evoke a "frightening surreal look". To achieve a more saturated red composition, Fraser deployed an Alexa LF camera with an optical filter designed to obstruct green and blue wavelengths.

At the same time, Villeneuve endeavored to create exteriors of the Harkonnen home planet Giedi Prime, since only an interior set had been shown in the first film at night. He and Fraser deliberated about ideas as the novel did not contain much detail about the planet. They envisioned Giedi Prime as a plastic, black-and-white industrial world, the result of the host star emitting no color. For this portion of Dune: Part Two, the filmmakers replaced the standardized infrared cut-off filters in the cameras with 87C filters, which blocked light perceptible to the human eye to create a desaturated, high resolution infrared image. Fraser utilized this practice for Zero Dark Thirty (2012) and Rogue One: A Star Wars Story (2016). The use of infrared filters also corresponded to aims for a visual effect that would confirm Feyd-Rautha's physicality and cruelty in the gladiator duel, the most prominently featured Giedi Prime scene. Fraser compared the footage to "that sort of ghoulish look that you get from that light at night from security cameras."

=== Visual effects ===
Dune: Part Two's 2,156 visual effects shots were supervised by Paul Lambert and developed by DNEG, Territory Studio, Wiley Co. VFX, RodeoFX, and Moving Picture Company. The artists devoted most of their work to fleshing out the main action sequences and the sandworms. Lambert described Fraser's shooting setup as "a godsend" because he had to plan for shots from just one camera rather than multiple. Filmmakers spent 22 months developing the visual effects.

A small filmmaking crew led by Villeneuve's wife and producing partner Tanya Lapointe visualized the worm wrangling sequences while Villeneuve was busy directing other scenes. The decision was influenced by the logistical complexities and Villeneuve's demands to film some of the footage in the desert. The shoot's first two months occurred in Budapest before finishing in the UAE. Two sets were constructed at the Budapest soundstages and stood in for the worm. The largest platform set was immobile, which meant the actors, visual effects, and camerawork simulated the movements and travel speed. In one instance, the camera recorded from an ascender rig moving at 23 feet per second to simulate the creature's (and Paul's) plunge into a dust cloud.

Fraser drew from images of miners next to large machinery to achieve perspective. Production's camera setup for Paul's worm ride shifts between shots from various angles of Paul, onlookers, and the animal actively resisting. Footage showing Paul hooked on the sandworm's back came from the soundstages. One of the soundstage sets was a cylindrical structure that reflected sunlight with a sand-colored chroma key surface. Within the structure was a worm skin platform mounted on a motion base to replicate the physics of the act. Camera crew brought an industrial fan to blast up to a ton of dust per day to emulate dust clouds. The shot of Paul's first grasp of the worm contains the sequence's most sophisticated visual effects work. Employing lighting, dust, and wind effects, it involved the worm skin platform rotating above a 90 degree tilt, creating the illusion of Paul dangling in midair. The portrayal of Paul's descent into the dune required the construction of an artificial sandpit supported underneath by three steel tubes that, when pulled by tractors, would cave in. Chalamet's stunt double Lorenz Hideyoshi stood in for the actor in these scenes.

An early action sequence featured Harkonnen soldiers raiding a "spice harvester", a large mining vehicle that was generated digitally from several structures as it was too massive to construct as a practical set. They include industrial tractors equipped with large black screens from which to cast shadows and steel structures standing in for the spice harvester's legs. The sequence makes use of multiple camera perspectives shot from a Sikorsky UH-60 Black Hawk helicopter and a crane that were then composited. For the gladiator duel, filmmakers left most of the scene intact except for footage with an actor whose tattoos had penetrated through his costume, taking Lambert months to fix. Another scene which posed a challenge encompassed the creation of fireworks-like explosions in Giedi Prime. The filmmakers rendered them to imitate the effect of ink diffusing in alcohol.

=== Costumes ===
Costume designer Jacqueline West sought out a broad range of modern and medieval references for the approximately 4,000 pieces in Dune: Part Two. Reference material was based off Villeneuve's description of Arrakis as "the beginning of a new world, a world starting over." West assembled a large team to devise the costumes, often remaking clothing and jewelry sourced from Turkey, Morocco, Japan, and Russia, among other countries. Clothing choices of the established characters, such as Paul and Lady Jessica, reflected changes in the story.

West's first conversation with Villeneuve about Part Two concerned the design of the "stillsuit", a Fremen bodysuit that produces drinkable water by recycling moisture from the host. These stillsuits were worn by the end of filming for Dune; West redesigned them with goggles and garments that were one-and-a-half inches thick. Additional wardrobe were prepared for the Fremen actors for combat and worm wrangling. West said she adorned Chalamet in cloaks to project a "sage, monk-like quality" for his character, while Zendaya was dressed in more linen and silk caftans to emphasize her silhouette. The designers styled the Harkonnen in black leather and spandex fashions reminiscent of the work of Swiss artist H. R. Giger, with chains and accessories made from animal bone as adornments. Costumes of background performers in the gladiator battle incorporated an elongated hat that West stated was akin to a montera. Feyd-Rautha's wardrobe included wools and vinyl pieces. Sometimes, designers reconstructed costumes that did not appear black in test shots of the infrared cameras.

Much of the crew's costume-making efforts focused on the Bene Gesserit. West attempted to create costumes suggestive of each character's status and piety, crediting Catholic, Islamic, and Tarot imagery as influences. As opposed to Dune, Dune: Part Two clothes Lady Jessica in modest robes inscribed with the Fremen alphabet, drawing on the fashion of the Tuareg people of North Africa. Her costumes become more extravagant by the film's final sequences. West varied fits to indicate Jessica's pregnancy. Fenring is seen in an embellished blue taffeta gown similar in style to a habit, which was inspired by 1950s haute couture fashion and Balenciaga. West's vision for Irulan was to dress to create "constrained but glamorous" looks, represented in gowns and beaded headpieces constructed on a molding of Pugh's head. Designers produced the most elaborate costume, a chainmail dress, in two weeks.

=== Music ===
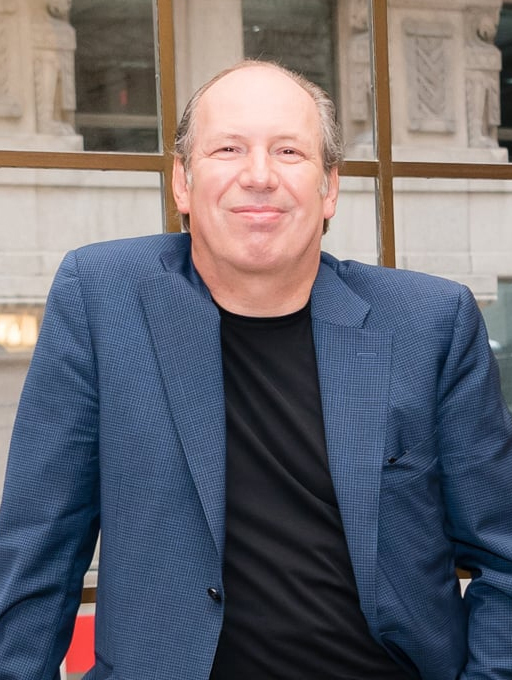
Hans Zimmer in 2018

Dune: Part Two's score was composed by Hans Zimmer, with five musicians from his live band—Loire Cotler, Pedro Eustache, Guthrie Govan, Tina Guo, and Juan Garcia-Herreros—serving as performers. Zimmer had already composed 90 minutes of music by the time the first film was running in theaters. Rather than using an orchestra, the completed score expands upon the composer's earlier work in Dune with a dissonant, ambient sound. Zimmer said the few melodies in the music were intended to accentuate the film's portrayal of human connection in a hostile world. Settings determined the tone and choice of instrumentation. The musicians recorded the Dune: Part Two score with percussion, synthesizers manufactured by Expressive E and Haken Audio, an electric cello, feedback produced through an audio processor, resonators, and a modified duduk, a reed woodwind instrument originating from Armenia. Zimmer cites alienation and loneliness as the core musical themes.

On February 15, 2024, Warner Bros. imprint WaterTower Music debuted two singles, "A Time of Quiet Between the Storms" and "Harvester Attack", to support the soundtrack's release. The 24-track album was released on all digital and physical formats a week later on February 23.

== Release ==
=== Marketing ===
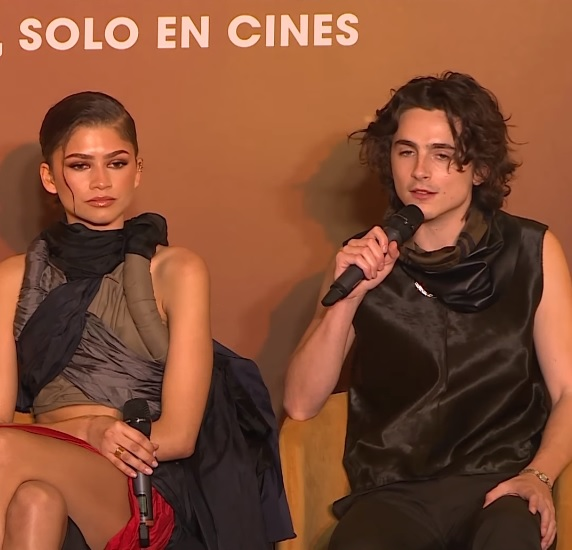
Zendaya and Chalamet at a Dune: Part Two photo call, Mexico City

Dune: Part Two premiered on February 6, 2024 at the Auditorio Nacional in Mexico City. Villeneuve and the actors spent the month embarking on a publicity tour with red carpet premieres in Paris (February 12), London (February 15), and Seoul (February 21), before closing with the film's US premiere on February 25 at Lincoln Center in New York. Several weeks prior, Dune: Part Two was shown in a private screening at a palliative care facility in Quebec, organized by Villeneuve, Lapointe, and nonprofit executive Josée Gagnon for a terminally ill resident with who they had correspondence. Attendees were required to put away their phones and sign non-disclosure agreements.

Warner Bros. oversaw the marketing campaign for Dune: Part Two at a cost of $100–155 million. (Note: Initial box office reports estimated that the advertising expenditures ran to $100 million. Deadline Hollywood later calculated the budget at $155 million in a piece for their annual "Most Valuable Blockbuster" series.) It launched the promotional cycle with a trade show exhibit at CinemaCon in April 2023, unveiling the first trailer. This was followed by the dissemination of said trailer, a theatrical release poster, and new footage of the actors in character online that May. The studio released two more trailers in June and December 2023. Further presentation panels at CineEurope and CCXP entailed interviews with the ensemble and, in the latter, a screening of the first ten minutes of the film. Warner Bros. previewed Dune: Part Two in conjunction with their February 2024 re-release of Christopher Nolan's Tenet (2020), running a week before its debut in theaters. The film was advertised with TV-commercial spots, short-form videos on the social media platform TikTok, video game expansion packs, and product sponsorships from Xbox, Hamilton Watch Company, Samsung, Smartwater, Nio Inc., and McFarlane Toys. In particular, TikTok clips showcasing red carpet fashions generated significant interest, according to one marketing study conducted by Vievo Media. A merchandising partnership for the Gundam franchise film Mobile Suit Gundam SEED Freedom (2024) saw the reproduction of Dune: Part Two's release poster with Freedom's lead characters, Lacus Clyne and Kira Yamato, in place of Chani and Paul.

Shot of the sandworm popcorn bucket, 2024

In January 2024, images of a then-forthcoming Dune-themed popcorn bucket from AMC Theatres, which featured a sandworm design, went viral and became an meme that compared the item to an artificial vagina. Reactions to the bucket received millions of views on TikTok, and it was the topic of jokes in US late-night television. The public scrutiny led interviewers to ask the filmmakers for their reactions. AMC's chief content officer Elizabeth Frank stated that the company would continue production of collectible popcorn buckets in a Variety interview in April 2024, despite claims that "we would have never created [the sandworm bucket] knowing it would be celebrated or mocked." At that time, the sandworm buckets were being resold for as high as $175.

Dune: Part Two was subject to several changes in the exhibition schedule. Originally set for an October 20, 2023 release date, Legendary and Warner Bros. postponed the film into November and again to March 15, 2024 in the wake of a protracted labor strike by SAG-AFTRA. The studios expedited the release by two weeks to March 1 when the strikes resolved. That week saw the film open in 71 countries in addition to the United States and Canada, starting in February 28. In North America and Europe, Dune: Part Two was released in IMAX 15-perforation 70 mm and standard 5-perforation 70 mm formats at select cinemas.

=== Home media ===
Warner Bros. Home Entertainment released Dune: Part Two digitally on April 16, 2024, and Blu-ray, DVD and Ultra HD Blu-ray on May 14. Both formats contain four featurettes detailing the fictional world and behind-the-scenes footage about the production, the sandworms, vehicle props, sound design and the actors. It finished as the year's second bestselling film in the United Kingdom with 817,000 units. Dune: Part Two debuted on HBO Max on May 21.

== Reception ==
=== Box office ===
Dune: Part Two grossed $282.7 million in the US and Canada (39.5% of the total) and $432.7 million overseas (60.5%) for a worldwide total of $715 million, making it the seventh highest-grossing film of 2024. Of that figure, about $145 million derived from IMAX screenings. Deadline Hollywood estimated that the film yielded $184.3 million in net profit, factoring in total revenue plus the costs for marketing, production, residuals, interest, administrative overhead, and gross participation fees. Film industry prognosticators and rival studios determined that it would have to surpass $500 million to generate a profit. Beyond North America, Dune: Part Two was most successful in the United Kingdom and China with $48.1 million from each as of April 2024. France, Germany, and Australia rounded out the film's five best-performing markets.

In the US and Canada, after grossing $12 million from advanced screenings, Dune: Part Two opened in 4,050 theaters. The film's $82.5 million opening gross was double Dune's and considerably higher than the box office projections from Warner Bros. CinemaScore polls conducted during opening night found that moviegoers gave an average grade of A on a scale of A+ to F. The majority of the exit polling respondents were men and skewed younger, with approximately 55% between the ages of 18 and 34. On the second weekend, Dune: Part Two experienced a 44% drop at the box office with $46.2 million, placing second to Kung Fu Panda 4. It remained the second highest-grossing film in the following weeks, the theater count staying above 3,000 by the March 24 weekend. The film's IMAX exhibition sustained the box office performance, resulting in an extension of the schedule by the studios in mid-April. Other factors cited were positive word-of-mouth, the cast's perceived star power and the film's exclusive theatrical window. Dune: Part Two finished its theatrical run in the US and Canada on May 16, 2024.

Internationally, Dune: Part Two's overall March 1 weekend rank was first at $100.02 million against projections to gross $85–90 million. The UK comprised the biggest share of the gross, where the film took $11.8 million. This was followed by France ($9.8 million), Germany ($9.1 million), South Korea ($6.9 million), and Australia ($6 million). The IMAX debut broke several box office records and, in the case of South Africa, consumed half of the film's local gross. In the next week, Dune: Part Two saw a 35% reduction in box office sales ($81 million), buoyed in part by an expansion in China that led to an opening gross of $20 million. The film averaged drops in sales of up to 42% several weeks thereafter. By the beginning of April, the offshore gross of Dune: Part Two was approaching $400 million.

=== Critical response ===
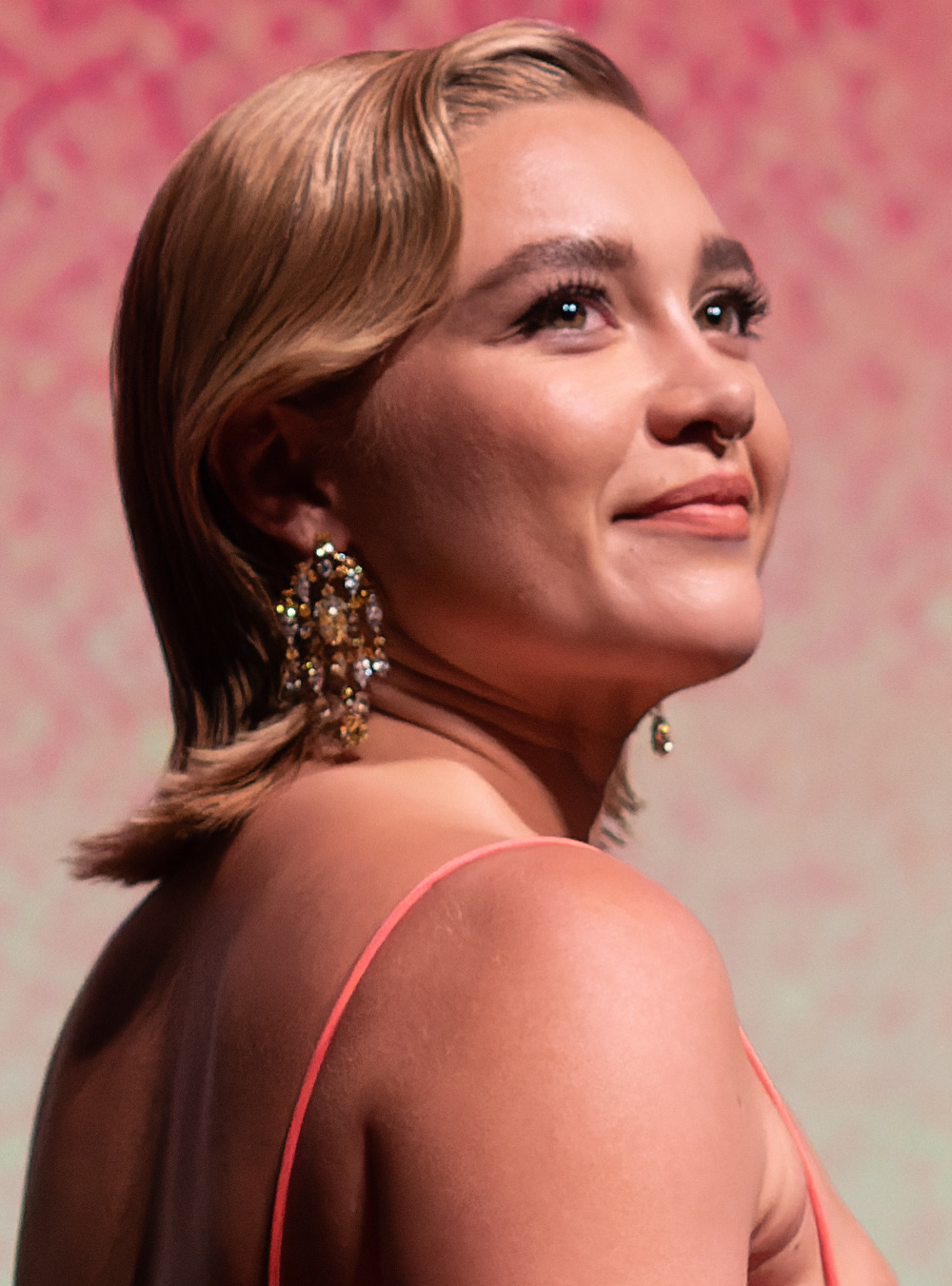
Florence Pugh (pictured in 2022) was one of several actors whose performance was praised, despite some critics viewing her role as largely inconsequential.

Dune: Part Two was well received in the media. The American Film Institute cited it as one of the top ten films of 2024, with the organization's write up saying the film "unleashes all the powers of the art form to fulfill the prophecy of its predecessor." Dune: Part Two drew near unanimous praise for its fictional world, which critics recognized for its craftsmanship and sense of immersion. (Note: Attributed to multiple references:)

A recurring subject in the reviews was the actors' performances. The tone was generally positive, the ensemble described as "exceptional" and "impressive". The media gave individual notices to Chalamet, Zendaya, Butler, Pugh, Ferguson, Bardem, Walken, Bautista, Skarsgård, and Seydoux for their acting, which, according to The Washington Post, highlighted Villeneuve's "brilliant job of casting." (Note: Attributed to multiple references:) Often, critics singled out Butler for further praise for his portrayal of Feyd-Rautha in appearance and expression, the actor noted for exuding an "arresting snarl and strut." (Note: Attributed to multiple references:) Chalamet's work received more conflicting reviews ranging from "a bit flat" to a career best, with Little White Lies writing that he forms the ensemble's emotional core with Zendaya and Ferguson. There were minor objections to Dune: Part Two related to characterization; for example, a few journalists viewed the film's Irulan as largely inconsequential, even though Pugh was praised for exhibiting "quiet pools of respite in an otherwise frenetic, sensorially relentless epic." (Note: Attributed to multiple references:) Conversational scenes involving Paul and Chani drew a wider spectrum of responses centering on a perceived chemistry or lack thereof between Chalamet and Zendaya, (Note: Attributed to multiple references:) but they were dismissed by others, such as Time Out and The Boston Globe, as material hampering the main story and said actors.

Reviews further examined the execution of the film story and themes. There was appreciation for the plot from several critics, who ascribed improvements in storytelling to a more streamlined treatment of events. (Note: Attributed to multiple references:) Despite the praise, a loss of narrative momentum was cited as a flaw of Feyd-Rautha-centric scenes and, more frequently, the film's closing scenes, the latter resulting in a lackluster climax, according to Peter Bradshaw. (Note: Attributed to multiple references:) Mick LaSalle criticized Dune: Part Two's moral tale about seemingly good people succumbing to corruption, believing it made the struggles of the characters difficult to care about. One debate concerned whether the film's interpretation of imperialism and colonialism was sharp. David Sims said much of the enjoyable moments derive from Paul's understanding of Fremen life, though others argued Dune: Part Two did not go far enough in its exploration of imperialism, either for presenting the Fremen as a secondary focus or failing to interrogate the Atreides' connection to the ruling elites. Some of the discourse concentrates on a view of the story within the framework of a white savior narrative; whereas The Boston Globe wrote this was an effect of efforts "almost as bad as if these notions hadn't been interrogated at all", the Salon writer maintained that Dune: Part Two undermines conventional Hollywood depictions of a white savior by instead portraying Paul as a hero-turned-villain. Another source of criticism was the film's use of West Asian and North African cultural motifs, which some critics argued expunged book material and real world geopolitical context.

On the review aggregation website Rotten Tomatoes, Dune: Part Two holds an approval rating of 92% from 466 reviews, with an average rating of 8.4/10. The site's critics consensus reads, "Visually thrilling and narratively epic, Dune: Part Two continues Denis Villeneuve's adaptation of the beloved sci-fi series in spectacular form." Metacritic, which employs a weighted average, assigned the film a score of 79 out of 100 based on reviews of 62 critics, suggesting "generally favorable reviews".

=== Accolades ===
Dune: Part Two entered the 97th Academy Awards season with five nominations, including for Best Picture and Best Cinematography. This was half the amount Dune received, and film industry discourse occasionally focused on Dune: Part Two's diminished Academy Award recognition. Some of the filmmakers criticized the lack of Best Original Score and Best Director nominations specifically. The former was attributed to an independent review by the Academy of Motion Picture Arts and Sciences, which dictated that Zimmer's reuse of material from Dune breached the organization's eligibility requirements for scores of sequels. Even so, the film won two Oscars for Best Sound and Best Visual Effects.

At the 52nd Saturn Awards, Dune: Part Two led the candidates with fourteen nominations, garnering five for Best Science Fiction Film, Best Director (Villeneuve), Best Supporting Actress (Ferguson), Best Production Design (Vermette), and Best Special Effects (Lambert, Rhys Salacombe, Gred Nefzer, Stephen James). Additional wins came at the 29th Satellite Awards (two from nine nominations), the 30th Critics' Choice Awards (one from ten), the 78th British Academy Film Awards (two from seven), and the 67th Grammy Awards, among others. (Note: Attributed to multiple references:)

== Sequel ==
Villeneuve was contemplating a trilogy of films as early as 2021. The third film, Dune: Part Three, will adapt the events in Dune Messiah (1969) with a story taking place 17 years after Dune: Part Two. Villeneuve said he intended to work after Chalamet had aged, probably to correspond with the passage of time in the fictional world. Nevertheless, he started writing the screenplay in 2023, and Legendary announced development of the film in April 2024. Dune: Part Three is scheduled for release on December 18, 2026 and is expected to be Villeneuve's final Dune film.

== See also ==
- List of films featuring eclipses
- List of films split into multiple parts
