= Tina Guo =

Chinese-American cello player (born 1985)

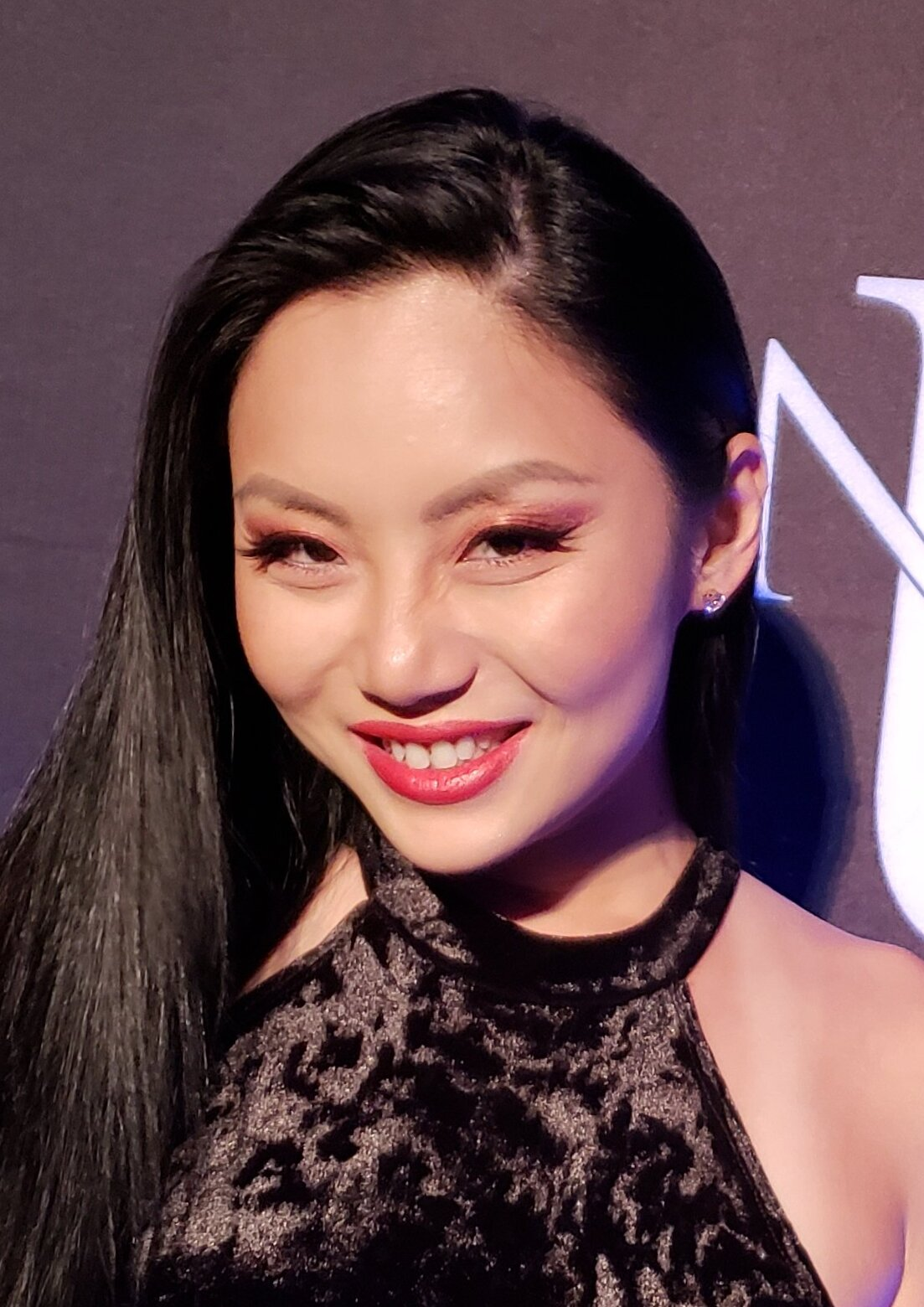
- Guo in 2018

Background information
- Born: 28 October 1985 (age 40); Shanghai, China
- Genres: Classical rock; new-age; heavy metal; industrial metal
- Occupation: Musician
- Instruments: Cello; erhu; vocals
- Years active: 1994–present
- Labels: Guo Industries; Sony Music
- Website: www.tinaguo.com

Tina Guo (Chinese: 郭婷娜; pinyin: Guō Tíngnà) (born 28 October 1985) is a Chinese-born American cellist and erhuist from San Diego. Her international career as a cellist, erhuist, and composer is characterized by videos featuring theatrical backdrops and elaborate costumes, a range of genres, and an improvisatory style in film, television, and video game scores.

She has appeared as a soloist with the San Diego Symphony the National Symphony Orchestra (Mexico), the Thessaloniki State Symphony Orchestra in Greece (Κρατική Ορχήστρα Θεσσαλονίκης), the Petrobras Symphony in Brazil, and the Vancouver Island Symphony in British Columbia. She also performed with violinist Midori Goto in Dvorak's American String Quartet at Walt Disney Concert Hall in Los Angeles, and completed four national tours of Mexico and Italy performing the Shostakovich, Dvorak, Haydn, and Saint-Saëns Cello Concertos. She toured as a featured guest with Al Di Meola, Yoshiki of X Japan, and recently appeared with the Tenerife Symphony and Choir in the Canary Islands performing "Batman: The Dark Knight" Suite at the Tenerife International Film Festival, featured on Electric Cello. In February 2019, she toured with the Victoria Symphony. On August 1, 2019, she joined the German symphonic metal band Beyond the Black at Wacken Open Air Festival. She also performed with Swedish power metal band Sabaton on their headlining of the festival and recorded with them in 2021 the song “Steel Commanders”.

== Early life ==
Tina Guo was born in Shanghai, China to father Lu-Yan Guo, a concert cellist, and mother Fei-Fei Soong, a concert violinist, who are the current artistic directors of the California International Music and Art Festival, an annual event held in San Diego, California. Tina began playing piano at the age of 3 in China. At age five, she moved to the United States with her family, and began violin lessons with her mother.

== Career ==
In 2007, she toured Australia with Metaphor, an all-girl crossover band. Guo played with the Foo Fighters at the 2008 Grammy Awards, and with Off the Deep End she played at the wrap party for the Sundance Film Festival.

With Midori Gotō, she played in Antonín Dvořák's String Quartet No. 12 at Walt Disney Concert Hall in Los Angeles. With pianist William Joseph, she performed in Mallorca, Spain for the International Philanthropy Summit.

From 2011 to 2013, Guo toured as the featured electric cellist with Cirque du Soleil's Michael Jackson: The Immortal World Tour.

Guo performed alongside Johnny Marr of the Smiths and Hans Zimmer at the Premiere of Inception, and in a sold-out concert for DreamWorks with Hans Zimmer and John Powell, featuring her as soloist on electric cello and erhu. In 2015, she performed for the League of Legends World Championship to a sold-out arena at Staples Center in Los Angeles and an audience of 33 million streaming online. Guo was featured on the Electric Cello in a super-band for the event with The Crystal Method, Wes Borland (Limp Bizkit), Danny Lohner (NIN), Joe Letz (Combichrist), and the Hollywood Scoring Orchestra. Guo has also been a featured performer at Comic Con, BlizzCon, and with Video Games Live. In 2015, Guo was featured with video game music band Critical Hit, performing at most of the Wizard World Comic Cons. She featured in Baroque rock group Vivaldianno's "City of Mirrors" Tour which appeared in arenas throughout Europe in June 2015.

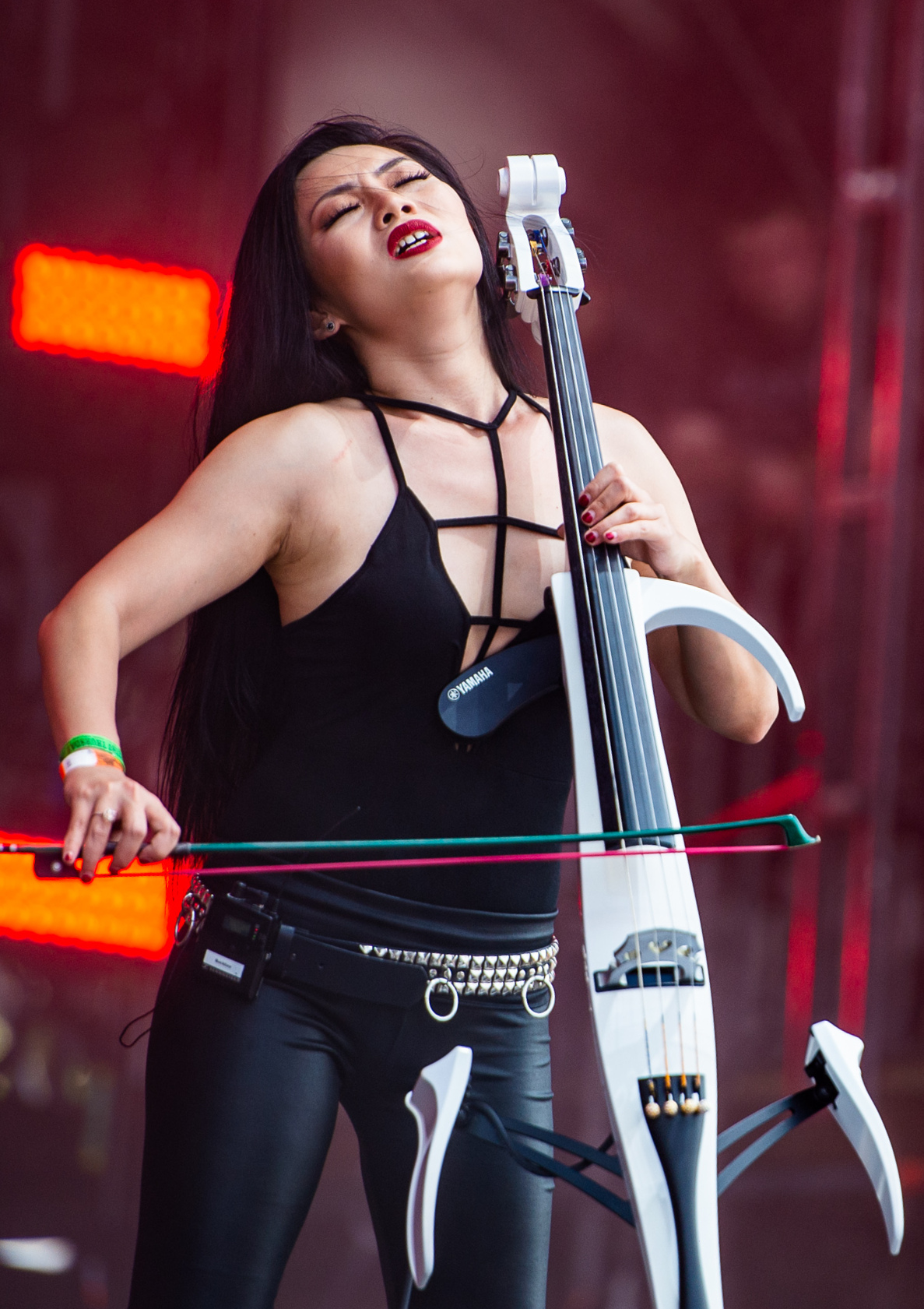
Guo performing with Beyond the Black at Wacken Open Air 2019

Guo was featured on The Ellen DeGeneres Show playing "Beat It" on electric cello, and also performed at the American Country Music Awards with Carrie Underwood, on Dancing with the Stars with Carlos Santana and India Arie, Jimmy Kimmel Live with Ellie Goulding, the Lopez Show with Far East Movement, the Grammy Awards with the Foo Fighters, at the MTV Movie Awards, on American Idol, at San Diego Comic-Con featured on the electric cello in the Battlestar Galactica Orchestra, and with Brazilian guitarist Victor Biglione in a Jimi Hendrix Tribute Concert at the Copacabana Palace in Rio de Janeiro. She also performed at the Sundance Film Festival, the Playboy Mansion, and has shared the stage with The Tenors, Stevie Wonder, Peter Gabriel, Josh Groban, John Legend, LeAnn Rimes, Chris Isaak, Il Divo, Ariana Grande, Lupe Fiasco, Common, Jennifer Hudson, and Michael McDonald. Corporate clients have included Microsoft, Cephalon Biopharmaceutics, Adecco, and the PGA.

The instrumental metal music video for her song "Queen Bee" won Best Short Film/Music Video at the Downtown Los Angeles Film Festival. Her songs "Queen Bee" and "Forbidden City" are also available for download to play for Rock Band on Xbox 360 and PlayStation 3. Metal Hammer Magazine UK described Guo as "an international sensation" and she was also featured in Glamour Magazine Russia with a two-page spread.

Guo has toured with blues guitarist Joe Bonamassa as part of a diverse all-acoustic backup band, and Hans Zimmer.

By October 2017, she toured as a headlining act to promote her album "Game On!" with John Huldt on guitar, Kfir Melamed on bass and Frank Klepacki on drums.

In December 2018, she took on the God of War main theme song and collaborated with Inon Zur.

== Recordings ==
Guo recorded her first solo CD, Autumn Winds, a classical/new-age album. Her other album releases include The Journey, Eternity, Ray of Light, Tina Guo & Composers for Charity, A Cello Christmas, Cello Metal, a full length metal album and Hollywood's Greatest Themes, an album of famous soundtracks re-imagined, Game On! and her recent album was Dies Irae.

Guo is featured on screen in commercials for Mazda6, and United Airlines, and was also a featured soloist in Cirque Du Soleil's Michael Jackson: The Immortal World Tour from 2011 to 2013 performing in sold-out arenas around the world. Guo performed to 2 million audience members worldwide with the tour, and they topped the charts for 2 years as the highest-grossing tour in America and sold-out shows in arenas worldwide. Guo is also featured on the Epic Records/Jackson Estate release "Immortal," replacing the original guitar solo in "Beat It" with an Electric Cello/Guitar Battle-style duet with guitarist Greg Howe.

Guo was the cello soloist on the scores of Sherlock Holmes, Iron Man 2, Clash of the Titans, Red Riding Hood, Abduction, Olympus Has Fallen, Escape Plan, CSI: NY, Vikings, The Borgias, Sleepy Hollow, Iron Chef America, Blizzard's Diablo III, Call of Duty: Black Ops II, Revelation Online 2015 by Chinese game giant Netease, and Journey, which was nominated for a Grammy Award for Best Score Soundtrack for Visual Media. Guo can also be heard on the soundtracks of Inception, Hancock, Battle: Los Angeles, The Hangover Part II, Predators, Fast Five, Arthur, No Strings Attached, Beginners, Public Enemies, Rango, The Rite, X-Men: First Class, Your Highness, Yogi Bear, The Mentalist, Family Guy, American Dad!, The Cleveland Show, King of the Hill, Dunkirk, Pirates of the Caribbean: Dead Men Tell No Tales, commercials for the iPhone, Under Armour, and many others. Guo also contributed Electric Cello to the creation of elements that were used by Sound Designer Scott Martin Gershin in the creation of the Kaijus in Pacific Rim. Her arrangement and performance of "The Flight of the Bumble-Bee" was featured in the end credits for The Heartbreak Kid and she was an additional composer on the feature film Persecuted. The Tina Guo Sample Library by Cinesamples is one of the most popular cello solo libraries available on the market today, used by composers and producers in countless media music projects.

Guo is featured on the cello in an instrumental set piece for the 100th episode of My Little Pony: Friendship Is Magic.

Guo has recorded on hundreds of albums, with artists such as John Legend, Ciara, David Archuleta, and Big K.R.I.T. She was featured on Al B. Sure!'s new single, "I Love It," from his upcoming album Honey I'm Home and was also featured on Two Steps From Hell's album SkyWorld.

Inner Passion, her 2016 collaboration with pianist Peter Kater for Hearts of Space Records, debuted at number four on the Billboard New Age Albums chart.

She is also notable as the soloist on electric cello creating the theme for Wonder Woman in the 2016 film Batman v. Superman: Dawn of Justice with Hans Zimmer, which she reprised in the Wonder Woman standalone film with Rupert Gregson-Williams as well as its 2020 sequel, Wonder Woman 1984, with Zimmer once again. In October 2018, she featured on the Jennifer Thomas album 'The Fire Within'. In 2021, she recorded together with Swedish metal band Sabaton on the song and music video "Steel Commanders". She was a featured guest on Kamelot's thirteenth studio album, The Awakening.

== Instruments ==
Guo performs on an 1878 Gand & Bernardel cello. On electric cello, she plays the Custom Tina Guo Model Yamaha SVC-200; she is endorsed by Yamaha and played their instrument at the NAMM Show 2009.

== Personal life ==
Guo's first published work as an author is "Event Horizons of Yin and Yang", a collection of philosophical prose and poetry.

Guo was married to Ray Armando Morabito, an electronic music producer. She is currently in a relationship with Kreator bassist Frédéric Leclercq.

== Discography ==
- Autumn Winds (2011)
- The Journey (2011)
- Eternity (2013)
- Ray of Light (2014)
- A Cello Christmas (2014)
- Cello Metal (2015)
- Inner Passion (2016) (with Peter Kater)
- Game On! (2017)
- Winter Night: Traces In The Snow (2020) (with Leo Z)
- Dies Irae (2021)

=== Cello contributions ===
| Year | Title | Notes |
|---|---|---|
| 2007 | The Heartbreak Kid | —N/a |
| 2007 | Captain Titan's Special G | Short film |
| 2008 | Sky Pilot | Short film |
| 2008 | Hancock | —N/a |
| 2008 | 1895 | —N/a |
| 2009 | Grace | —N/a |
| 2009 | Live Evil | —N/a |
| 2009 | Sherlock Holmes | —N/a |
| 2010 | Clash of the Titans | —N/a |
| 2010 | Iron Man 2 | —N/a |
| 2010 | Predators | —N/a |
| 2010 | Inception | —N/a |
| 2010 | Beginners | —N/a |
| 2010 | 1 a Minute | —N/a |
| 2010 | Level 26: Dark Prophecy | —N/a |
| 2010 | Yogi Bear | —N/a |
| 2011 | The Rite | —N/a |
| 2011 | Rango | —N/a |
| 2011 | Red Riding Hood | —N/a |
| 2011 | Battle: Los Angeles | —N/a |
| 2011 | Your Highness | —N/a |
| 2011 | Arthur | —N/a |
| 2011 | Fast Five | —N/a |
| 2011 | The Hangover Part II | —N/a |
| 2011 | X-Men: First Class | —N/a |
| 2011 | Abduction | —N/a |
| 2011 | Restoring the Light | —N/a |
| 2011 | Dig | —N/a |
| 2012 | Journey | Video game |
| 2012 | Call of Duty: Black Ops II | Video game |
| 2012 | No God, No Master | —N/a |
| 2013 | Olympus Has Fallen | —N/a |
| 2014 | The Dark Valley | —N/a |
| 2014 | Persecuted | —N/a |
| 2014 | Damaged | Television film |
| 2015 | Doppia luce | Short film |
| 2015 | The Daughters of Eve | Short film |
| 2015 | The Heavy Load | Short film |
| 2015 | Run Fast | Short film |
| 2015 | Martyrs | —N/a |
| 2015 | Assassin's Creed Syndicate | Video game |
| 2015 | James | Short film |
| 2016 | Standoff | —N/a |
| 2016 | The Monkey King 2 | —N/a |
| 2016 | Pitbull: New Orders | —N/a |
| 2016 | Batman v Superman: Dawn of Justice | —N/a |
| 2016 | Shadow of the Beast | Video game |
| 2016 | The Trees of Eden | Short film |
| 2017 | The Boss Baby | —N/a |
| 2017 | Pirates of the Caribbean: Dead Men Tell No Tales | —N/a |
| 2017 | Wonder Woman | —N/a |
| 2017 | Dunkirk | —N/a |
| 2017 | Lego Marvel Super Heroes 2 | Video game |
| 2017 | In My Steps | —N/a |
| 2017 | Bullet Head | —N/a |
| 2017 | Nisabdham | Tamil film |
| 2018 | Qi | Short film |
| 2018 | Sticks | Short film |
| 2018 | Extinction | Video game |
| 2018 | Controlled Chaos | Nita Strauss's album |
| 2019 | Dark Phoenix | —N/a |
| 2019 | Jing Hua | Short film |
| 2019 | Erica | Video game |
| 2020 | Cyberpunk 2077 | Video game |
| 2020 | Wonder Woman 1984 | —N/a |
| 2021 | Dune | —N/a |
| 2021 | Tomb Raider Reloaded | Video game |
| 2021 | The Choice 2 | Egyptian serial |
| 2021 | South of Heaven | —N/a |
| 2021 | Army of Thieves | —N/a |
| 2022 | Metal Lords | —N/a |
| 2022 | Top Gun: Maverick | —N/a |
| 2022 | Endling - Extinction is Forever | Video game |
| 2023 | The Awakening | Kamelot album |
| 2023 | Gran Turismo | —N/a |
| 2023 | The Creator | —N/a |
| 2024 | Dune: Part Two | —N/a |
| 2024 | 3 Body Problem | TV series |
| 2024 | Rite Here Rite Now | Live Performance - If You Have Ghosts |
| 2026 | Death Above Life (Deluxe Edition) | Orbit Culture album |
