= Autumn Winds =

Studio album by Tina Guo
- Released: May 17, 2011
- Recorded: 2011
- Studio: Guo Industries
- Genre: Neoclassical, New-age
- Length: 40:39

Tina Guo chronology
Autumn Winds (2011)	The Journey (2011)

Autumn Winds is the debut studio album by Tina Guo. It was released on May 17, 2011. The album features composers from Johann Sebastian Bach, Jules Massenet, Lu-Yan Guo, Gabriel Fauré, Thomas DiCandia and Nikolai Rimsky-Korsakov.

== Track listing ==
1. I Lost My Love in the Wind 6:10
2. Air 5:08
3. Melody (Elegy) 2:20
4. Ice Lake 3:20
5. The Peace Variations 2:47
6. Jesu, Joy of Man's Desiring 3:44
7. Meditation from Thais 5:37
8. Apres un reve 3:29
9. A Song With No Words 6:23
10. (The Tragedy Of) The Bumble-Bee 1:41

== Release history ==
Country	Date	Format	Label	Catalogue
USA	May 17, 2011	CD, digital download	Self released	
