= Cale Boyter =

American film producer

- Born: June 28, 1972 (age 54)
- Occupation: Film producer

Cale Boyter (born June 28, 1972) is an American film producer. He was nominated for two Academy Awards in the category Best Picture for the films Dune and Dune: Part Two.

== Selected filmography ==
- Dumb and Dumberer: When Harry Met Lloyd (2003)
- Elf (2003)
- The Butterfly Effect (2004)
- Blade: Trinity (2004)
- A History of Violence (2005)
- Wedding Crashers (2005)
- Just Friends (2005)
- Grilled (2006)
- How to Eat Fried Worms (2006)
- Tenacious D in The Pick of Destiny (2006)
- Shoot 'Em Up (2007)
- Semi-Pro (2008)
- Journey to the Center of the Earth (2008)
- Pride and Glory (2008)
- Ghosts of Girlfriends Past (2009)
- Noah (2014)
- The SpongeBob Movie: Sponge Out of Water (2015)
- Monster Trucks (2016)
- Same Kind of Different as Me (2017)
- Pacific Rim Uprising (2018)
- Detective Pikachu (2019)
- Dune (2021; co-nominated with Mary Parent and Denis Villeneuve)
- The Machine (2023)
- Dune: Part Two (2024; co-nominated with Mary Parent, Tanya Lapointe and Denis Villeneuve)
- A Minecraft Movie (2025)
- Dune: Part Three (2026)
- Street Fighter (2026)
- Animal Friends (2027)
- A Minecraft Movie Squared (2027)
- Gundam (TBA)
