= Cello Metal (album) =

Studio album by Tina Guo
- Released: 4 August 2015
- Recorded: 2015
- Studio: Guo Industries
- Genre: Heavy metal; Thrash metal; Symphonic metal; Groove metal
- Length: 45:18
- Label: Sony Masterworks

Tina Guo chronology
A Cello Christmas (2014)	Cello Metal (2015)	Inner Passion (2016)

Cello Metal is the sixth studio album by Tina Guo. It features John 5 and Al Di Meola and was released on 4 August 2015.

== Track listing ==
No.	Title	Length
1.	"Child of Genesis"	4:59
2.	"The God Particle"	5:16
3.	"Eternal Night"	3:21
4.	"Sanitarium"	6:28
5.	"Iron Man"	5:45
6.	"The Trooper"	4:16
7.	"Raining Blood"	4:08
8.	"Cowboys From Hell (Introduction)"	0:43
9.	"Cowboys From Hell"	4:04
10.	"Forbidden City"	3:59
11.	"Queen Bee"	2:19

== Release history ==
Country	Date	Format	Label	Catalogue
Europe and USA	4 August 2015	CD, digital download	Sony Masterworks	
