= List of accolades received by Dune (2021 film) =

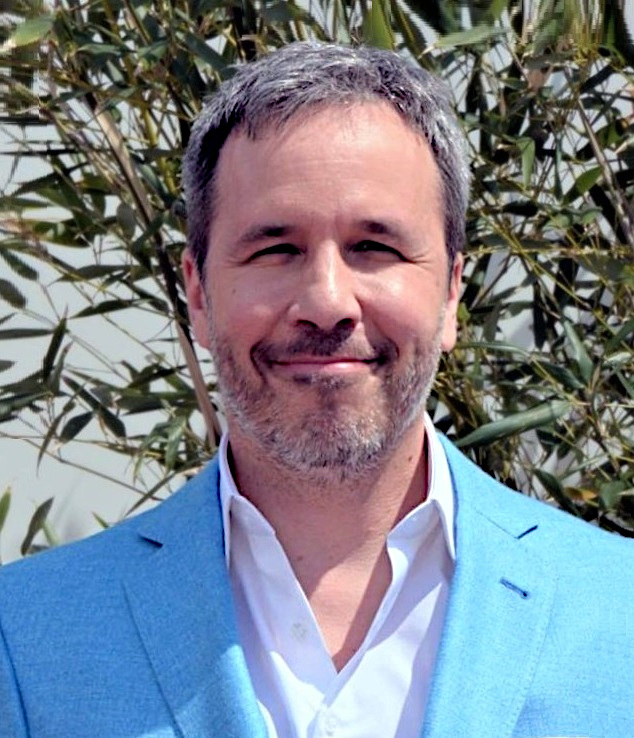
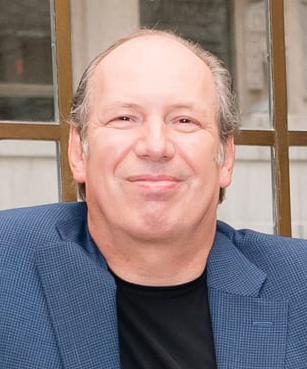
- Denis Villeneuve received critical acclaim for directing and co-writing the film, and Hans Zimmer earned praise for composing the musical score.
Accolades
Award	Wins	Nominations
AACTA International Awards	1	2
AARP Movies for Grownups Awards	0	1
Academy Awards	6	10
Actors and Actresses Union Awards	0	1
Alliance of Women Film Journalists Awards	0	3
American Cinema Editors Awards	0	1
American Film Institute Awards	1	1
American Society of Cinematographers Awards	1	1
Art Directors Guild Awards	1	1
Austin Film Critics Association Awards	1	8
British Academy Film Awards	5	11
Camerimage	1	1
Chicago Film Critics Association Awards	1	6
Cinema Audio Society Awards	1	1
Costume Designers Guild Awards	1	1
Critics' Choice Movie Awards	3	10
Critics' Choice Super Awards	2	3
Dallas–Fort Worth Film Critics Association Awards	4	4
David di Donatello	0	1
Directors Guild of America Awards	0	1
Dorian Awards	1	3
Dragon Awards	1	1
Dublin Film Critics' Circle Awards	3	3
Florida Film Critics Circle Awards	3	4
Georgia Film Critics Association Awards	3	5
Golden Globe Awards	1	3
Golden Reel Awards	1	3
Golden Trailer Awards	1	6
Grammy Awards	0	1
Grande Prêmio do Cinema Brasileiro	0	1
Hollywood Critics Association Awards	4	10
Hollywood Music in Media Awards	1	1
Hollywood Professional Association Awards	1	2
Houston Film Critics Society Awards	3	5
Hugo Awards	1	1
IndieWire Critics Poll	2	2
International Cinephile Society Awards	0	2
International Film Music Critics Association Awards	0	2
London Film Critics Circle Awards	1	3
Los Angeles Film Critics Association Awards	1	1
Lumiere Awards	2	2
MTV Millennial Awards	0	1
MTV Movie & TV Awards	0	2
National Board of Review Awards	1	1
New York Film Critics Online Awards	1	1
Nickelodeon Kids' Choice Awards	1	1
Online Film Critics Society Awards	2	9
People's Choice Awards	0	4
Producers Guild of America Awards	0	1
San Diego Film Critics Society Awards	3	9
San Francisco Bay Area Film Critics Circle Awards	0	6
Santa Barbara International Film Festival	2	2
Satellite Awards	4	10
Saturn Awards	1	5
Seattle Film Critics Society Awards	3	10
Set Decorators Society of America Awards	1	1
Society of Composers & Lyricists Awards	0	1
St. Louis Gateway Film Critics Association Awards	2	8
Toronto Film Critics Association Awards	0	1
USC Scripter Awards	0	1
Visual Effects Society Awards	4	6
Washington D.C. Area Film Critics Association Awards	3	6
Writers Guild of America Awards	0	1
World Soundtrack Awards	0	1

Totals (Note: Certain award groups do not simply award one winner. They acknowledge several different recipients, have runners-up, and have third place. Since this is a specific recognition and is different from losing an award, runner-up mentions are considered wins in this award tally. For simplification and to avoid errors, each award in this list has been presumed to have had a prior nomination.)
- Wins: 89
- Nominations: 220

Dune is a 2021 American epic science fiction film directed by Denis Villeneuve and written by Villeneuve, Jon Spaihts, and Eric Roth. It is the first of a two-part adaptation of the 1965 novel of the same name by Frank Herbert, primarily covering the first half of the book. Set in the far future, the film follows Paul Atreides as his family, the noble House Atreides, is thrust into a war for the deadly and inhospitable desert planet Arrakis. The ensemble cast includes Timothée Chalamet, Rebecca Ferguson, Oscar Isaac, Josh Brolin, Stellan Skarsgård, Dave Bautista, Stephen McKinley Henderson, Zendaya, David Dastmalchian, Chang Chen, Sharon Duncan-Brewster, Charlotte Rampling, Jason Momoa, and Javier Bardem.

Originally scheduled for a late 2020 release, Dune was delayed by the COVID-19 pandemic. The film made its world premiere at the 78th Venice International Film Festival on September 3, 2021. Warner Bros. Pictures released the film simultaneously in over 4,000 theaters in the United States and Canada and through the HBO Max streaming service on October 22, 2021. The film grossed a worldwide total of $406 million on a $165 million budget. Rotten Tomatoes, a review aggregator, surveyed 498 reviews and judged 83% to be positive.

Dune garnered many awards and nominations in a variety of categories with particular praise for Villeneuve's direction as well as its musical score, visual effects, cinematography, production design, sound effects, and film editing. It garnered ten nominations at the 94th Academy Awards, including Best Picture, and went on to win a leading six awards for Best Original Score, Best Sound, Best Cinematography, Best Production Design, Best Film Editing, and Best Visual Effects. At the 75th British Academy Film Awards, the film received eleven nominations and received five awards for Best Cinematography, Best Original Music, Best Production Design, Best Sound, and Best Special Visual Effects.

The film earned three nominations at the 79th Golden Globe Awards, winning one for Best Original Score. Dune was nominated for ten awards at the 27th Critics' Choice Awards; it won three for Best Production Design, Best Visual Effects, and Best Score. In addition, both the American Film Institute and the National Board of Review selected the film as one of the top ten films of the year.

== Accolades ==
Accolades received by Dune (2021 film)
Award	Date of ceremony	Category	Recipients	Result	Ref.
AACTA International Awards	January 26, 2022	Best Film	Dune	Nominated	
AACTA International Awards	January 26, 2022	Best Direction	Denis Villeneuve	Won	
AARP Movies for Grownups Awards	March 18, 2022	Best Director	Denis Villeneuve	Nominated	
Academy Awards	March 27, 2022	Best Picture	Mary Parent, Denis Villeneuve, and Cale Boyter	Nominated	
Academy Awards	March 27, 2022	Best Adapted Screenplay	Eric Roth, Jon Spaihts, and Denis Villeneuve	Nominated	
Academy Awards	March 27, 2022	Best Original Score	Hans Zimmer	Won	
Academy Awards	March 27, 2022	Best Costume Design	Jacqueline West and Robert Morgan	Nominated	
Academy Awards	March 27, 2022	Best Sound	Mac Ruth, Mark Mangini, Theo Green, Doug Hemphill, and Ron Bartlett	Won	
Academy Awards	March 27, 2022	Best Film Editing	Joe Walker	Won	
Academy Awards	March 27, 2022	Best Makeup and Hairstyling	Donald Mowat, Love Larson, and Eva von Bahr	Nominated	
Academy Awards	March 27, 2022	Best Cinematography	Greig Fraser	Won	
Academy Awards	March 27, 2022	Best Production Design	Zsuzsanna Sipos and Patrice Vermette	Won	
Academy Awards	March 27, 2022	Best Visual Effects	Paul Lambert, Tristan Myles, Brian Connor, and Gerd Nefzer	Won	
Actors and Actresses Union Awards	March 14, 2022	Best Male Performance in an International Production	Javier Bardem	Nominated	
Alliance of Women Film Journalists Awards	January 25, 2022	Best Screenplay, Adapted	Jon Spaihts, Denis Villeneuve, and Eric Roth	Nominated	
Alliance of Women Film Journalists Awards	January 25, 2022	Best Cinematography	Greig Fraser	Nominated	
Alliance of Women Film Journalists Awards	January 25, 2022	Best Editing	Joe Walker	Nominated	
American Cinema Editors Awards	March 5, 2022	Best Edited Feature Film – Dramatic	Joe Walker	Nominated	
American Film Institute Awards	March 11, 2022	Top 10 Movies of the Year	Dune	Won	
American Society of Cinematographers Awards	March 20, 2022	Outstanding Achievement in Cinematography in Theatrical Releases	Greig Fraser	Won	
Art Directors Guild Awards	March 5, 2022	Excellence in Production Design for a Fantasy Film	Patrice Vermette	Won	
Austin Film Critics Association Awards	January 11, 2022	Best Film	Dune	Nominated	
Austin Film Critics Association Awards	January 11, 2022	Best Director	Denis Villeneuve	Nominated	
Austin Film Critics Association Awards	January 11, 2022	Best Adapted Screenplay	Jon Spaihts, Denis Villeneuve, and Eric Roth	Nominated	
Austin Film Critics Association Awards	January 11, 2022	Best Original Score	Hans Zimmer	Nominated	
Austin Film Critics Association Awards	January 11, 2022	Best Cinematography	Greig Fraser	Nominated	
Austin Film Critics Association Awards	January 11, 2022	Best Film Editing	Joe Walker	Won	
Austin Film Critics Association Awards	January 11, 2022	Best Stunt	Dune	Nominated	
Austin Film Critics Association Awards	January 11, 2022	Best Ensemble	Dune	Nominated	
British Academy Film Awards	March 13, 2022	Best Film	Mary Parent, Cale Boyter, and Denis Villeneuve	Nominated	
British Academy Film Awards	March 13, 2022	Best Adapted Screenplay	Jon Spaihts, Denis Villeneuve, and Eric Roth	Nominated	
British Academy Film Awards	March 13, 2022	Best Casting	Francine Maisler	Nominated	
British Academy Film Awards	March 13, 2022	Best Cinematography	Greig Fraser	Won	
British Academy Film Awards	March 13, 2022	Best Costume Design	Robert Morgan and Jacqueline West	Nominated	
British Academy Film Awards	March 13, 2022	Best Editing	Joe Walker	Nominated	
British Academy Film Awards	March 13, 2022	Best Makeup and Hair	Love Larson and Donald Mowat	Nominated	
British Academy Film Awards	March 13, 2022	Best Original Music	Hans Zimmer	Won	
British Academy Film Awards	March 13, 2022	Best Production Design	Patrice Vermette and Zsuzsanna Sipos	Won	
British Academy Film Awards	March 13, 2022	Best Sound	Mac Ruth, Mark Mangini, Doug Hemphill, Theo Green, and Ron Bartlett	Won	
British Academy Film Awards	March 13, 2022	Best Special Visual Effects	Brian Connor, Paul Lambert, Tristan Myles, and Gerd Nefzer	Won	
Camerimage	November 20, 2021	Bronze Frog	Greig Fraser	Won	
Chicago Film Critics Association Awards	December 15, 2021	Best Original Score	Hans Zimmer	Nominated	
Chicago Film Critics Association Awards	December 15, 2021	Best Costume Design	Robert Morgan and Jacqueline West	Nominated	
Chicago Film Critics Association Awards	December 15, 2021	Best Editing	Joe Walker	Nominated	
Chicago Film Critics Association Awards	December 15, 2021	Best Cinematography	Greig Fraser	Nominated	
Chicago Film Critics Association Awards	December 15, 2021	Best Art Direction/Production Design	Dune	Nominated	
Chicago Film Critics Association Awards	December 15, 2021	Best Use of Visual Effects	Dune	Won	
Cinema Audio Society Awards	March 19, 2022	Outstanding Achievement in Sound Mixing for a Motion Picture – Live Action	Mac Ruth, Ron Bartlett, Douglas Hemphill, Alan Meyerson, Tommy O'Connell, and Don White	Won	
Costume Designers Guild Awards	March 9, 2022	Excellence in Sci-Fi/Fantasy Film	Jacqueline West and Robert Morgan	Won	
Critics' Choice Movie Awards	March 13, 2022	Best Picture	Dune	Nominated	
Critics' Choice Movie Awards	March 13, 2022	Best Director	Denis Villeneuve	Nominated	
Critics' Choice Movie Awards	March 13, 2022	Best Adapted Screenplay	Jon Spaihts, Denis Villeneuve, and Eric Roth	Nominated	
Critics' Choice Movie Awards	March 13, 2022	Best Cinematography	Greig Fraser	Nominated	
Critics' Choice Movie Awards	March 13, 2022	Best Production Design	Patrice Vermette and Zsuzsanna Sipos	Won	
Critics' Choice Movie Awards	March 13, 2022	Best Editing	Joe Walker	Nominated	
Critics' Choice Movie Awards	March 13, 2022	Best Costume Design	Jacqueline West and Robert Morgan	Nominated	
Critics' Choice Movie Awards	March 13, 2022	Best Hair and Makeup	Dune	Nominated	
Critics' Choice Movie Awards	March 13, 2022	Best Visual Effects	Dune	Won	
Critics' Choice Movie Awards	March 13, 2022	Best Score	Hans Zimmer	Won	
Critics' Choice Super Awards	March 17, 2022	Best Science Fiction/Fantasy Movie	Dune	Won	
Critics' Choice Super Awards	March 17, 2022	Best Actor in a Science Fiction/Fantasy Movie	Timothée Chalamet	Nominated	
Critics' Choice Super Awards	March 17, 2022	Best Actress in a Science Fiction/Fantasy Movie	Rebecca Ferguson	Won	
Dallas–Fort Worth Film Critics Association Awards	December 20, 2021	Best Picture	Dune	Runner-up	
Dallas–Fort Worth Film Critics Association Awards	December 20, 2021	Best Director	Denis Villeneuve	Runner-up	
Dallas–Fort Worth Film Critics Association Awards	December 20, 2021	Best Cinematography	Greig Fraser	Won	
Dallas–Fort Worth Film Critics Association Awards	December 20, 2021	Best Musical Score	Hans Zimmer	Won	
David di Donatello	May 3, 2022	Best Foreign Film	Dune	Nominated	
Directors Guild of America Awards	March 12, 2022	Outstanding Directing – Feature Film	Denis Villeneuve	Nominated	
Dorian Awards	March 17, 2022	Best Director	Denis Villeneuve	Nominated	
Dorian Awards	March 17, 2022	Most Visually Striking Film	Dune	Won	
Dorian Awards	March 17, 2022	Best Film Music	Hans Zimmer	Nominated	
Dragon Awards	September 5, 2022	Best Science Fiction or Fantasy Movie	Dune	Won	
Dublin Film Critics' Circle Awards	December 21, 2021	Best Picture	Dune	2nd place	
Dublin Film Critics' Circle Awards	December 21, 2021	Best Director	Denis Villeneuve	2nd place	
Dublin Film Critics' Circle Awards	December 21, 2021	Best Cinematography	Greig Fraser	Won	
Florida Film Critics Circle Awards	December 22, 2021	Best Cinematography	Greig Fraser	Nominated	
Florida Film Critics Circle Awards	December 22, 2021	Best Score	Hans Zimmer	Won	
Florida Film Critics Circle Awards	December 22, 2021	Best Art Direction/Production Design	Dune	Won	
Florida Film Critics Circle Awards	December 22, 2021	Best Visual Effects	Dune	Won	
Georgia Film Critics Association Awards	January 14, 2022	Best Picture	Dune	Nominated	
Georgia Film Critics Association Awards	January 14, 2022	Best Director	Denis Villeneuve	Nominated	
Georgia Film Critics Association Awards	January 14, 2022	Best Cinematography	Greig Fraser	Won	
Georgia Film Critics Association Awards	January 14, 2022	Best Production Design	Patrice Vermette, Richard Roberts, and Zsuzsanna Sipos	Won	
Georgia Film Critics Association Awards	January 14, 2022	Best Original Score	Hans Zimmer	Won	
Golden Globe Awards	January 9, 2022	Best Motion Picture – Drama	Dune	Nominated	
Golden Globe Awards	January 9, 2022	Best Director	Denis Villeneuve	Nominated	
Golden Globe Awards	January 9, 2022	Best Original Score	Hans Zimmer	Won	
Golden Reel Awards	March 13, 2022	Outstanding Achievement in Sound Editing – Dialogue and ADR for Feature Film	David Bach	Nominated	
Golden Reel Awards	March 13, 2022	Outstanding Achievement in Sound Editing – Sound Effects and Foley for Feature Film	Theo Green, Mark Mangini, Dave Whitehead, Phil Barrie, Lee Gilmore, Greg Ten Bosch, Robert Kellough, Piero Mura, Christopher Bonis, Andy Malcolm, Goro Koyama, and Sandra Fox	Won	
Golden Reel Awards	March 13, 2022	Outstanding Achievement in Sound Editing – Feature Music	Clint Bennett, Ryan Rubin, and Peter Myles	Nominated	
Golden Trailer Awards	July 22, 2021	Best Fantasy Adventure	"Vision" (Wild Card)	Nominated	
Golden Trailer Awards	July 22, 2021	Best Teaser	"Test" (Wild Card)	Nominated	
Golden Trailer Awards	October 6, 2022	Best Sound Editing	"Odeon International Trailer" (Mob Scene)	Nominated	
Golden Trailer Awards	October 6, 2022	Best Original Score	"Time" (Wild Card)	Won	
Golden Trailer Awards	October 6, 2022	Best Action TV Spot	"Protect" (AV Squad)	Nominated	
Golden Trailer Awards	October 6, 2022	Best Fantasy Adventure TV Spot	"Frightened" (Mark Woollen & Associates)	Nominated	
Grammy Awards	April 3, 2022	Best Score Soundtrack for Visual Media	Hans Zimmer	Nominated	
Grande Prêmio do Cinema Brasileiro	August 10, 2022	Best International Film	Dune	Nominated	
Hollywood Critics Association Awards	February 28, 2022	Best Picture	Dune	Nominated	
Hollywood Critics Association Awards	February 28, 2022	Best Director	Denis Villeneuve	Won	
Hollywood Critics Association Awards	February 28, 2022	Best Score	Hans Zimmer	Won	
Hollywood Critics Association Awards	February 28, 2022	Best Cinematography	Greig Fraser	Won	
Hollywood Critics Association Awards	February 28, 2022	Best Production Design	Patrice Vermette	Nominated	
Hollywood Critics Association Awards	February 28, 2022	Best Film Editing	Joe Walker	Nominated	
Hollywood Critics Association Awards	February 28, 2022	Best Stunts	Dune	Nominated	
Hollywood Critics Association Awards	February 28, 2022	Best Costume Design	Robert Morgan and Jacqueline West	Nominated	
Hollywood Critics Association Awards	February 28, 2022	Best Hair & Makeup	Donald Mowat, Eva Von Bahr, and Love Larson	Nominated	
Hollywood Critics Association Awards	February 28, 2022	Best Visual Effects	Brian Connor, Gerd Nefzer, Paul Lambert, and Tristan Myles	Won	
Hollywood Music in Media Awards	November 17, 2021	Best Original Score in a Sci-Fi/Fantasy Film	Hans Zimmer	Won	
Hollywood Professional Association Awards	November 17, 2022	Outstanding Color Grading – Feature Film	David Cole (FotoKem) (Note: Also for The Batman)	Nominated	
Hollywood Professional Association Awards	November 17, 2022	Outstanding Sound – Feature Film	Mark Mangini, Theo Green, Doug Hemphill, Ron Bartlett, and Mac Ruth (Formosa Group)	Won	
Houston Film Critics Society Awards	January 19, 2022	Best Picture	Dune	Nominated	
Houston Film Critics Society Awards	January 19, 2022	Best Director	Denis Villeneuve	Nominated	
Houston Film Critics Society Awards	January 19, 2022	Best Original Score	Hans Zimmer	Won	
Houston Film Critics Society Awards	January 19, 2022	Best Cinematography	Greig Fraser	Won	
Houston Film Critics Society Awards	January 19, 2022	Best Visual Effects	Dune	Won	
Hugo Awards	September 4, 2022	Best Dramatic Presentation, Long Form	Jon Spaihts, Denis Villeneuve, Eric Roth, and Frank Herbert	Won	
IndieWire Critics Poll	December 13, 2021	Best Director	Denis Villeneuve	4th Place	
IndieWire Critics Poll	December 13, 2021	Best Cinematography	Greig Fraser	2nd Place	
International Cinephile Society Awards	February 6, 2022	Best Production Design	Patrice Vermette, Tom Brown, Richard Roberts, and Zsuzsanna Sipos	Nominated	
International Cinephile Society Awards	February 6, 2022	Best Sound Design	Phil Barrie, Theo Green, Mark A. Mangini, and David Whitehead	Nominated	
International Film Music Critics Association Awards	February 17, 2022	Film Score of the Year	Hans Zimmer	Nominated	
International Film Music Critics Association Awards	February 17, 2022	Best Original Score for a Fantasy/Science Fiction/Horror Film	Hans Zimmer	Nominated	
London Film Critics Circle Awards	February 6, 2022	Film of the Year	Dune	Nominated	
London Film Critics Circle Awards	February 6, 2022	Director of the Year	Denis Villeneuve	Nominated	
London Film Critics Circle Awards	February 6, 2022	Technical Achievement Award	Brian Connor, Paul Lambert, Tristan Myles, and Gerd Nefzer (visual effects)	Won	
Los Angeles Film Critics Association Awards	December 18, 2021	Best Cinematography	Greig Fraser	Runner-up	
Lumiere Awards	March 4, 2022	Best Feature Film – Live Action	Dune	Won	
Lumiere Awards	March 4, 2022	Best Use of High Dynamic Range – Live Action	Dune	Won	
Make-Up Artists and Hair Stylists Guild Awards	February 19, 2022	Best Period and/or Character Make-Up in a Feature-Length Motion Picture	Donald Mowat, Jo-Ann MacNeil, Rocky Faulkner, and Jennifer Stanfield	Nominated	
Make-Up Artists and Hair Stylists Guild Awards	February 19, 2022	Best Special Make-Up Effects in a Feature-Length Motion Picture	Donald Mowat, Love Larson, Eva von Bahr, and Rocky Faulkner	Nominated	
MTV Millennial Awards	July 10, 2022	Movie for the Win	Dune	Nominated	
MTV Movie & TV Awards	June 5, 2022	Best Movie	Dune	Nominated	
MTV Movie & TV Awards	June 5, 2022	Best Performance in a Movie	Timothée Chalamet	Nominated	
National Board of Review Awards	December 3, 2021	Top Ten Films of 2021	Dune	Won	
New York Film Critics Online Awards	December 12, 2021	Top 10 Films of 2021	Dune	Won	
Nickelodeon Kids' Choice Awards	April 9, 2022	Favorite Movie Actress	Zendaya (Note: Also for Spider-Man: No Way Home)	Won	
Online Film Critics Society Awards	January 24, 2022	Best Picture	Dune	Nominated	
Online Film Critics Society Awards	January 24, 2022	Best Director	Denis Villeneuve	Nominated	
Online Film Critics Society Awards	January 24, 2022	Best Adapted Screenplay	Jon Spaihts, Denis Villeneuve, and Eric Roth	Nominated	
Online Film Critics Society Awards	January 24, 2022	Best Cinematography	Greig Fraser	Nominated	
Online Film Critics Society Awards	January 24, 2022	Best Editing	Joe Walker	Nominated	
Online Film Critics Society Awards	January 24, 2022	Best Original Score	Hans Zimmer	Nominated	
Online Film Critics Society Awards	January 24, 2022	Best Production Design	Dune	Nominated	
Online Film Critics Society Awards	January 24, 2022	Best Costume Design	Dune	Won	
Online Film Critics Society Awards	January 24, 2022	Best Visual Effects	Dune	Won	
People's Choice Awards	December 7, 2021	The Movie of 2021	Dune	Nominated	
People's Choice Awards	December 7, 2021	The Drama Movie of 2021	Dune	Nominated	
People's Choice Awards	December 7, 2021	The Drama Movie Star of 2021	Timothée Chalamet	Nominated	
People's Choice Awards	December 7, 2021	The Drama Movie Star of 2021	Jason Momoa	Nominated	
Producers Guild of America Awards	March 19, 2022	Darryl F. Zanuck Award for Outstanding Producer of Theatrical Motion Pictures	Mary Parent, Cale Boyter, and Denis Villeneuve	Nominated	
San Diego Film Critics Society Awards	January 10, 2022	Best Picture	Dune	Nominated	
San Diego Film Critics Society Awards	January 10, 2022	Best Director	Denis Villeneuve	Nominated	
San Diego Film Critics Society Awards	January 10, 2022	Best Cinematography	Greig Fraser	Won	
San Diego Film Critics Society Awards	January 10, 2022	Best Editing	Joe Walker	Nominated	
San Diego Film Critics Society Awards	January 10, 2022	Best Costumes	Jacqueline West and Bob Morgan	Nominated	
San Diego Film Critics Society Awards	January 10, 2022	Best Production Design	Patrice Vermette, Richard Roberts, and Zsuzsanna Sipos	Nominated	
San Diego Film Critics Society Awards	January 10, 2022	Best Sound Design	Theo Green and Dave Whitehead	Won	
San Diego Film Critics Society Awards	January 10, 2022	Best Ensemble	Dune	Nominated	
San Diego Film Critics Society Awards	January 10, 2022	Best Visual Effects	Dune	Won	
San Francisco Bay Area Film Critics Circle Awards	January 10, 2022	Best Director	Denis Villeneuve	Nominated	
San Francisco Bay Area Film Critics Circle Awards	January 10, 2022	Best Adapted Screenplay	Jon Spaihts, Denis Villeneuve, and Eric Roth	Nominated	
San Francisco Bay Area Film Critics Circle Awards	January 10, 2022	Best Cinematography	Greig Fraser	Nominated	
San Francisco Bay Area Film Critics Circle Awards	January 10, 2022	Best Film Editing	Joe Walker	Nominated	
San Francisco Bay Area Film Critics Circle Awards	January 10, 2022	Best Original Score	Hans Zimmer	Nominated	
San Francisco Bay Area Film Critics Circle Awards	January 10, 2022	Best Production Design	Patrice Vermette	Nominated	
Santa Barbara International Film Festival	March 5, 2022	Variety Artisans Award	Greig Fraser (cinematography)	Won	
Santa Barbara International Film Festival	March 5, 2022	Variety Artisans Award	Jacqueline West and Bob Morgan (costume design)	Won	
Satellite Awards	April 2, 2022	Best Motion Picture – Drama	Dune	Nominated	
Satellite Awards	April 2, 2022	Best Director	Denis Villeneuve	Nominated	
Satellite Awards	April 2, 2022	Best Adapted Screenplay	Denis Villeneuve, Eric Roth, and Jon Spaihts	Nominated	
Satellite Awards	April 2, 2022	Best Cinematography	Greig Fraser	Won	
Satellite Awards	April 2, 2022	Best Film Editing	Joe Walker	Won	
Satellite Awards	April 2, 2022	Best Art Direction and Production Design	Patrice Vermette, Richard Roberts, and Zsuzsanna Sipos	Nominated	
Satellite Awards	April 2, 2022	Best Costume Design	Jacqueline West and Robert Morgan	Nominated	
Satellite Awards	April 2, 2022	Best Original Score	Hans Zimmer	Won	
Satellite Awards	April 2, 2022	Best Sound (Editing and Mixing)	Mac Ruth, Mark A. Mangini, Theo Green, Doug Hemphill, and Ron Bartlett	Nominated	
Satellite Awards	April 2, 2022	Best Visual Effects	Paul Lambert, Tristan Myles, Brian Connor, and Gerd Nefzer	Won	
Saturn Awards	October 25, 2022	Best Science Fiction Film	Dune	Nominated	
Saturn Awards	October 25, 2022	Best Actor in a Film	Timothée Chalamet	Nominated	
Saturn Awards	October 25, 2022	Best Film Production Design	Patrice Vermette	Nominated	
Saturn Awards	October 25, 2022	Best Film Costume Design	Bob Morgan and Jacqueline West	Nominated	
Saturn Awards	October 25, 2022	Best Film Make-up	Donald Mowat, Love Larson, and Eva Von Bahr	Won	
Screen Actors Guild Awards	February 27, 2022	Outstanding Performance by a Stunt Ensemble in a Motion Picture	Dune	Nominated	
Seattle Film Critics Society Awards	January 17, 2022	Best Film	Dune	Nominated	
Seattle Film Critics Society Awards	January 17, 2022	Best Director	Denis Villeneuve	Nominated	
Seattle Film Critics Society Awards	January 17, 2022	Best Original Score	Hans Zimmer	Won	
Seattle Film Critics Society Awards	January 17, 2022	Best Cinematography	Greig Fraser	Nominated	
Seattle Film Critics Society Awards	January 17, 2022	Best Film Editing	Joe Walker	Won	
Seattle Film Critics Society Awards	January 17, 2022	Best Production Design	Patrice Vermette, Richard Roberts, and Zsuzsanna Sipos	Nominated	
Seattle Film Critics Society Awards	January 17, 2022	Best Costume Design	Jacqueline West and Bob Morgan	Nominated	
Seattle Film Critics Society Awards	January 17, 2022	Best Visual Effects	Paul Lambert, Tristan Myles, Brian Connor, and Gerd Nefzer	Won	
Seattle Film Critics Society Awards	January 17, 2022	Best Ensemble	Dune	Nominated	
Seattle Film Critics Society Awards	January 17, 2022	Villain of the Year	Baron Vladimir Harkonnen – portrayed by Stellan Skarsgård	Nominated	
Set Decorators Society of America Awards	February 22, 2022	Best Achievement in Décor/Design of a Science Fiction or Fantasy Feature Film	Zsuzsanna Sipos and Patrice Vermette	Won	
Society of Composers & Lyricists Awards	March 8, 2022	Outstanding Original Score for a Studio Film	Hans Zimmer	Nominated	
St. Louis Gateway Film Critics Association Awards	December 19, 2021	Best Director	Denis Villeneuve	Nominated	
St. Louis Gateway Film Critics Association Awards	December 19, 2021	Best Cinematography	Greig Fraser	Nominated	
St. Louis Gateway Film Critics Association Awards	December 19, 2021	Best Editing	Joe Walker	Nominated	
St. Louis Gateway Film Critics Association Awards	December 19, 2021	Best Production Design	Patrice Vermette	Nominated	
St. Louis Gateway Film Critics Association Awards	December 19, 2021	Best Music Score	Hans Zimmer	Won	
St. Louis Gateway Film Critics Association Awards	December 19, 2021	Best Costume Design	Robert Morgan and Jacqueline West	Nominated	
St. Louis Gateway Film Critics Association Awards	December 19, 2021	Best Adapted Screenplay	Dune	Nominated	
St. Louis Gateway Film Critics Association Awards	December 19, 2021	Best Visual Effects	Dune	Won	
Toronto Film Critics Association Awards	January 16, 2022	Best Director	Denis Villeneuve	Runner-up	
USC Scripter Awards	February 26, 2022	Best Adapted Screenplay — Film	Eric Roth, Jon Spaihts, and Denis Villeneuve	Nominated	
Visual Effects Society Awards	March 8, 2022	Outstanding Visual Effects in a Photoreal Feature	Paul Lambert, Brice Parker, Tristan Myles, Brian Connor, and Gerd Nefzer	Won	
Visual Effects Society Awards	March 8, 2022	Outstanding Created Environment in a Photoreal Feature	Rhys Salcombe, Seungjin Woo, Jeremie Touzery, and Marc Austin (for Arrakeen City)	Nominated	
Visual Effects Society Awards	March 8, 2022	Outstanding Model in a Photoreal or Animated Project	Marc Austin, Anna Yamazoe, Michael Chang, and Rachael Dunk (for Royal Ornithopter)	Won	
Visual Effects Society Awards	March 8, 2022	Outstanding Effects Simulations in a Photoreal Feature	Gero Grimm, Ivan Larinin, Hideki Okano, and Zuny An (for Dunes of Arrakis)	Won	
Visual Effects Society Awards	March 8, 2022	Outstanding Compositing and Lighting in a Feature	Gregory Haas, Francesco Dell'Anna, Abhishek Chaturvedi, and Cleve Zhu (for Attack on Arrakeen)	Won	
Visual Effects Society Awards	March 8, 2022	Outstanding Compositing and Lighting in a Feature	Patrick Heinen, Jacob Maymudes, Tj Burke, and James Jooyoung Lee (for Hologram and Hunter Seeker)	Nominated	
Washington D.C. Area Film Critics Association Awards	December 6, 2021	Best Director	Denis Villeneuve	Nominated	
Washington D.C. Area Film Critics Association Awards	December 6, 2021	Best Adapted Screenplay	Jon Spaihts, Denis Villeneuve, and Eric Roth	Nominated	
Washington D.C. Area Film Critics Association Awards	December 6, 2021	Best Cinematography	Greig Fraser	Won	
Washington D.C. Area Film Critics Association Awards	December 6, 2021	Best Production Design	Patrice Vermette, Richard Roberts, and Zsuzsanna Sipos	Won	
Washington D.C. Area Film Critics Association Awards	December 6, 2021	Best Editing	Joe Walker	Nominated	
Washington D.C. Area Film Critics Association Awards	December 6, 2021	Best Score	Hans Zimmer	Won	
Writers Guild of America Awards	March 20, 2022	Best Adapted Screenplay	Jon Spaihts, Denis Villeneuve, and Eric Roth	Nominated	
World Soundtrack Awards	October 22, 2022	Soundtrack Composer of the Year	Hans Zimmer (Note: Also for No Time to Die and The Survivor)	Nominated	

== See also ==
- List of accolades received by Dune: Part Two
