= 5th Hollywood Critics Association Film Awards =

Hollywood Critics Association Film Awards

- Date: February 28, 2022
- Site: Avalon Hollywood, Los Angeles
- Hosted by: Annaleigh Ashford
- Official website: hollywoodcreative.org

Highlights
- Best Picture: CODA
- Most awards: Dune (4)
- Most nominations: Dune (10)

The 5th Hollywood Critics Association Film Awards, presented by the Hollywood Critics Association, took place on February 28, 2022, in Avalon Hollywood. It was originally scheduled to take place on January 8, 2022, but was postponed due to the rising number of COVID-19 cases linked to the Omicron variant. The ceremony was hosted by Annaleigh Ashford.

The nominations were announced on December 2, 2021. Dune received the most nominations with ten, followed by Belfast and CODA with nine each; the latter won Best Picture. In regards to the total number of overall nominations for studios, Netflix led with 27, followed by Warner Bros. with 18 and Focus Features with 17.

== Winners and nominees ==
Winners are listed first and highlighted with boldface.

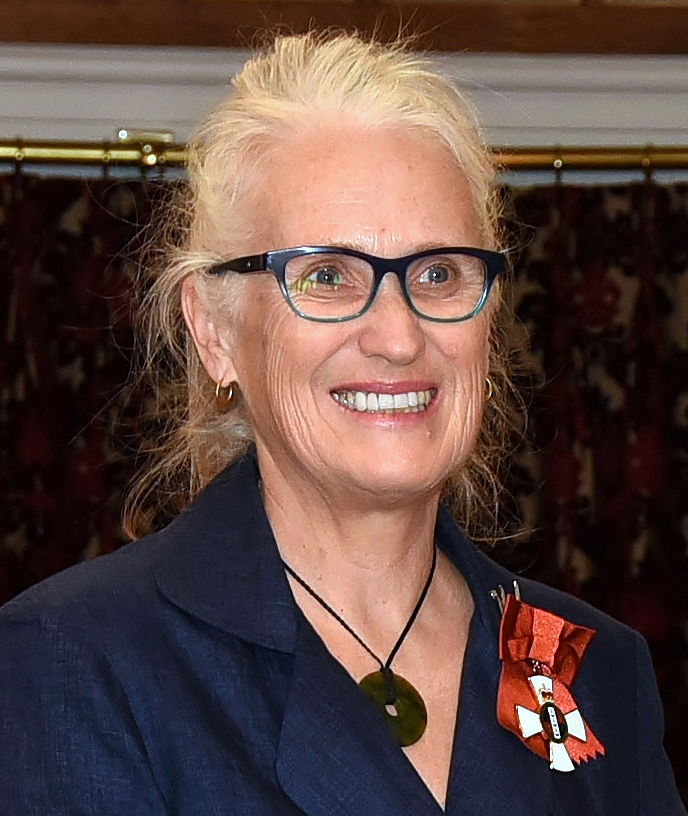
Jane Campion, Best Director co-winner

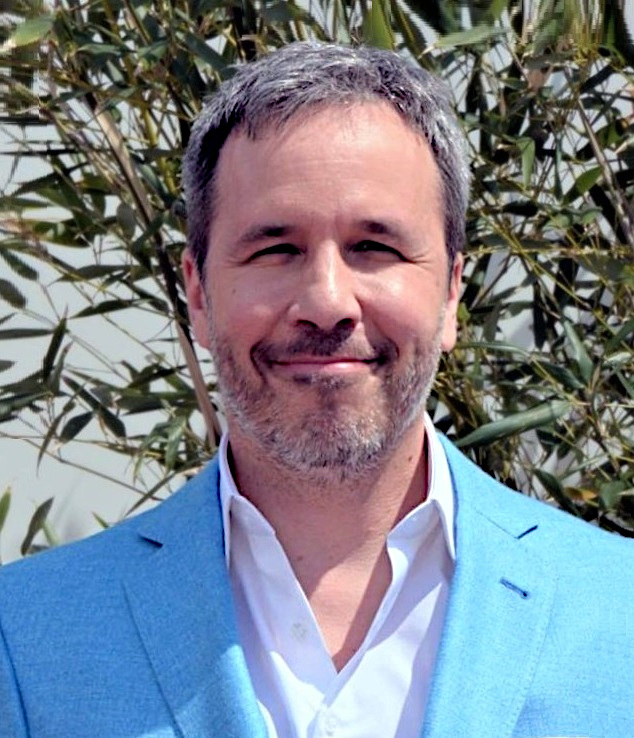
Denis Villeneuve, Best Director co-winner

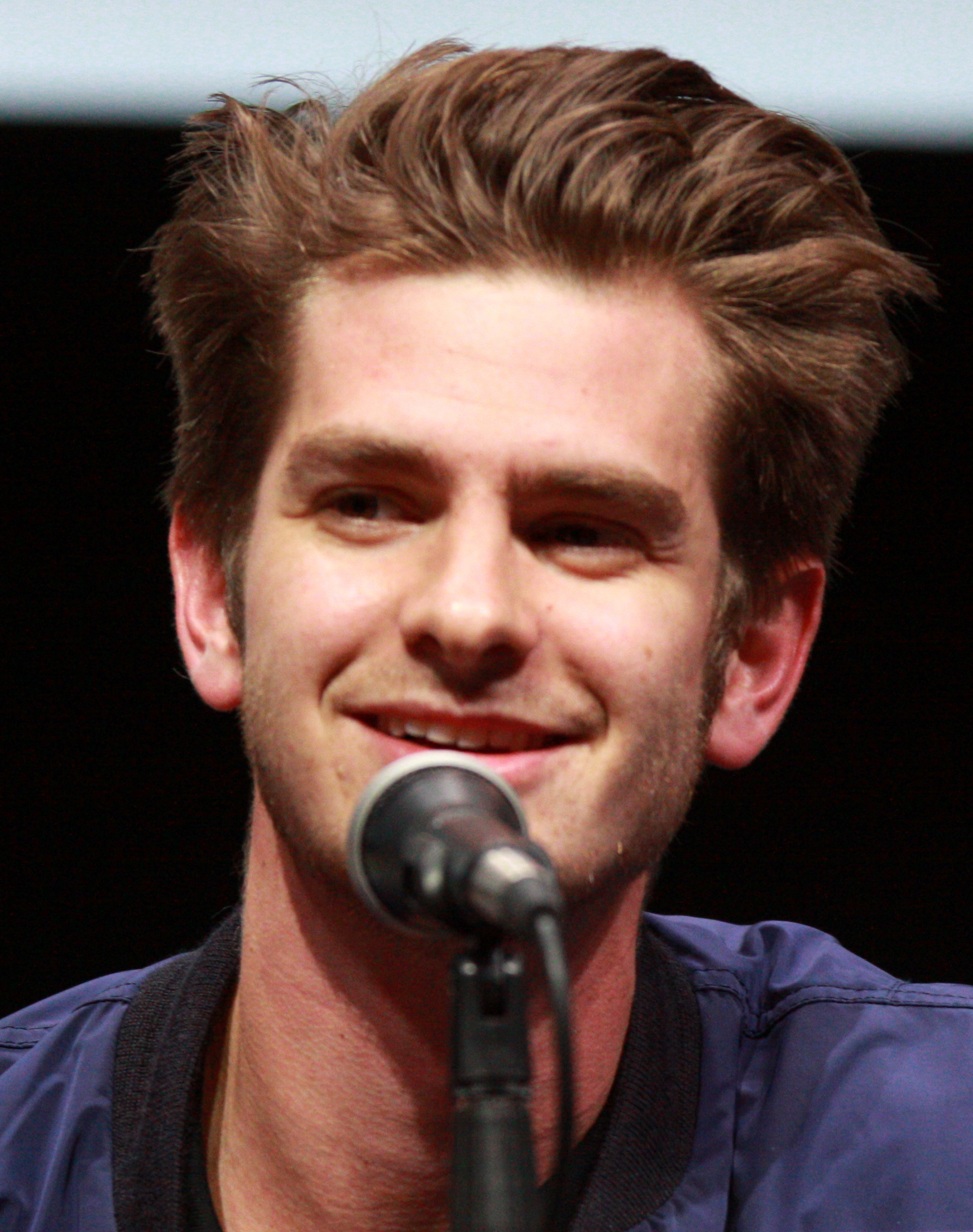
Andrew Garfield, Best Actor winner

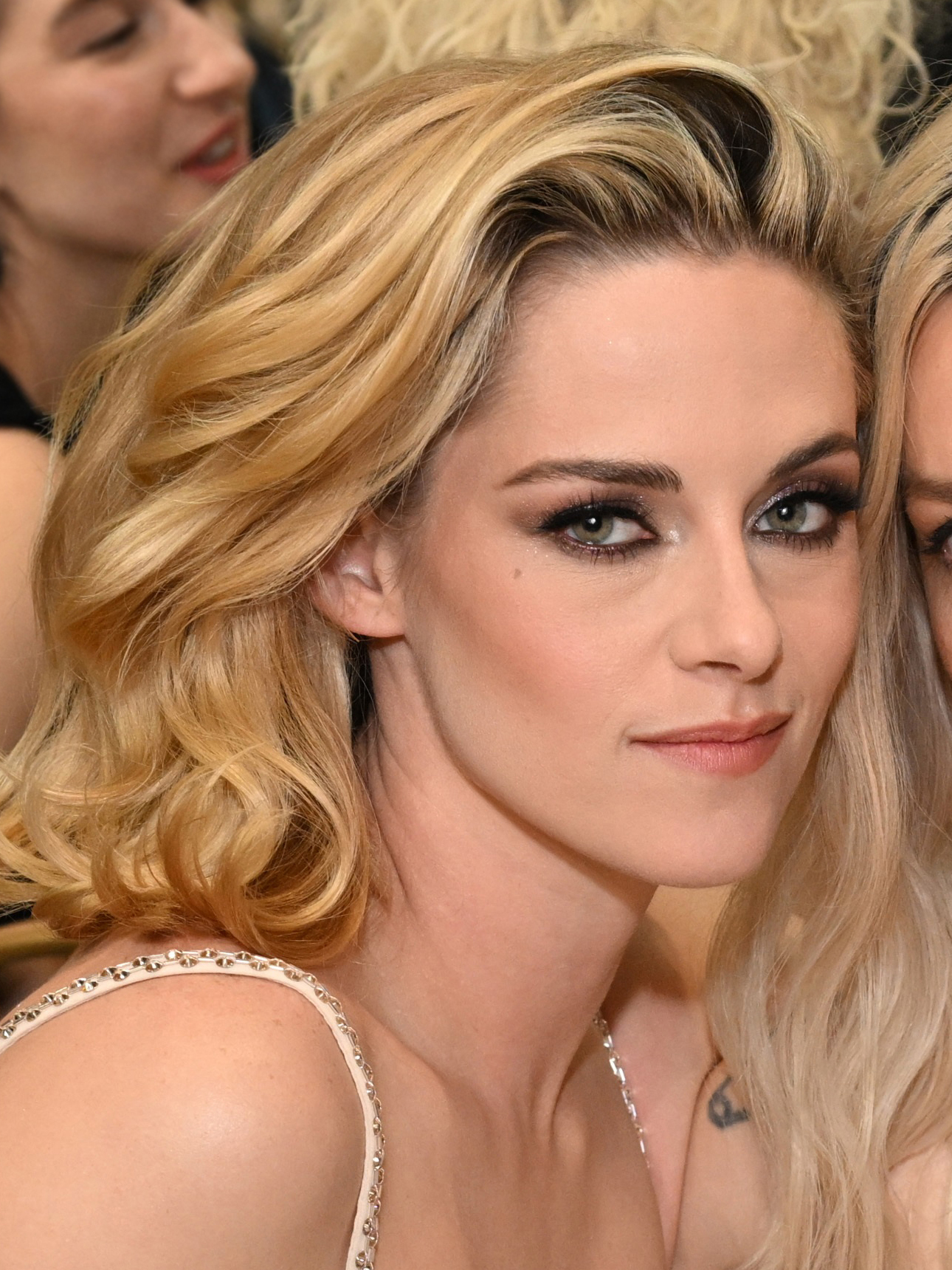
Kristen Stewart, Best Actress winner

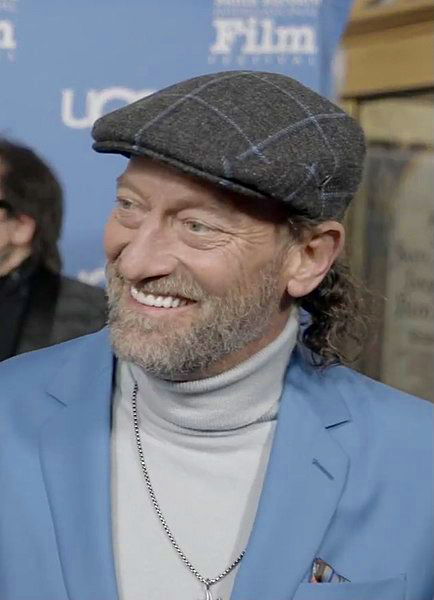
Troy Kotsur, Best Supporting Actor winner

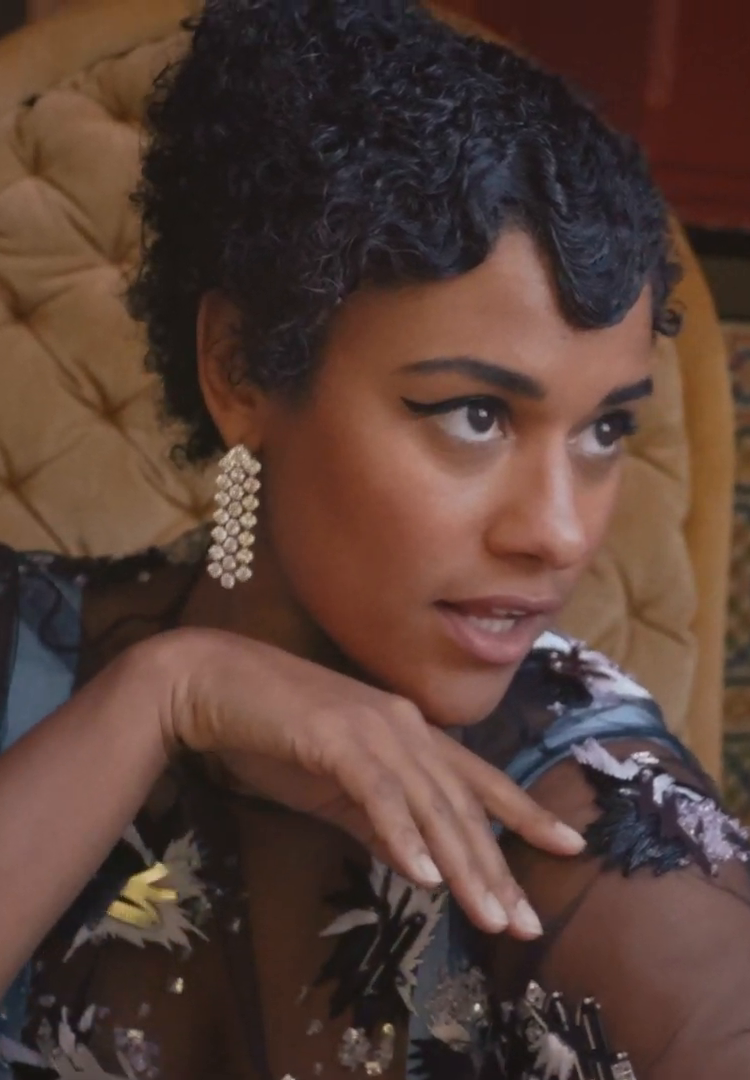
Ariana DeBose, Best Supporting Actress winner

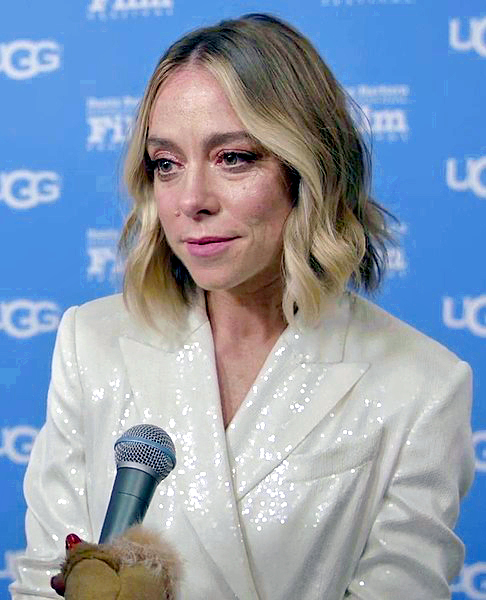
Sian Heder, Best Adapted Screenplay winner

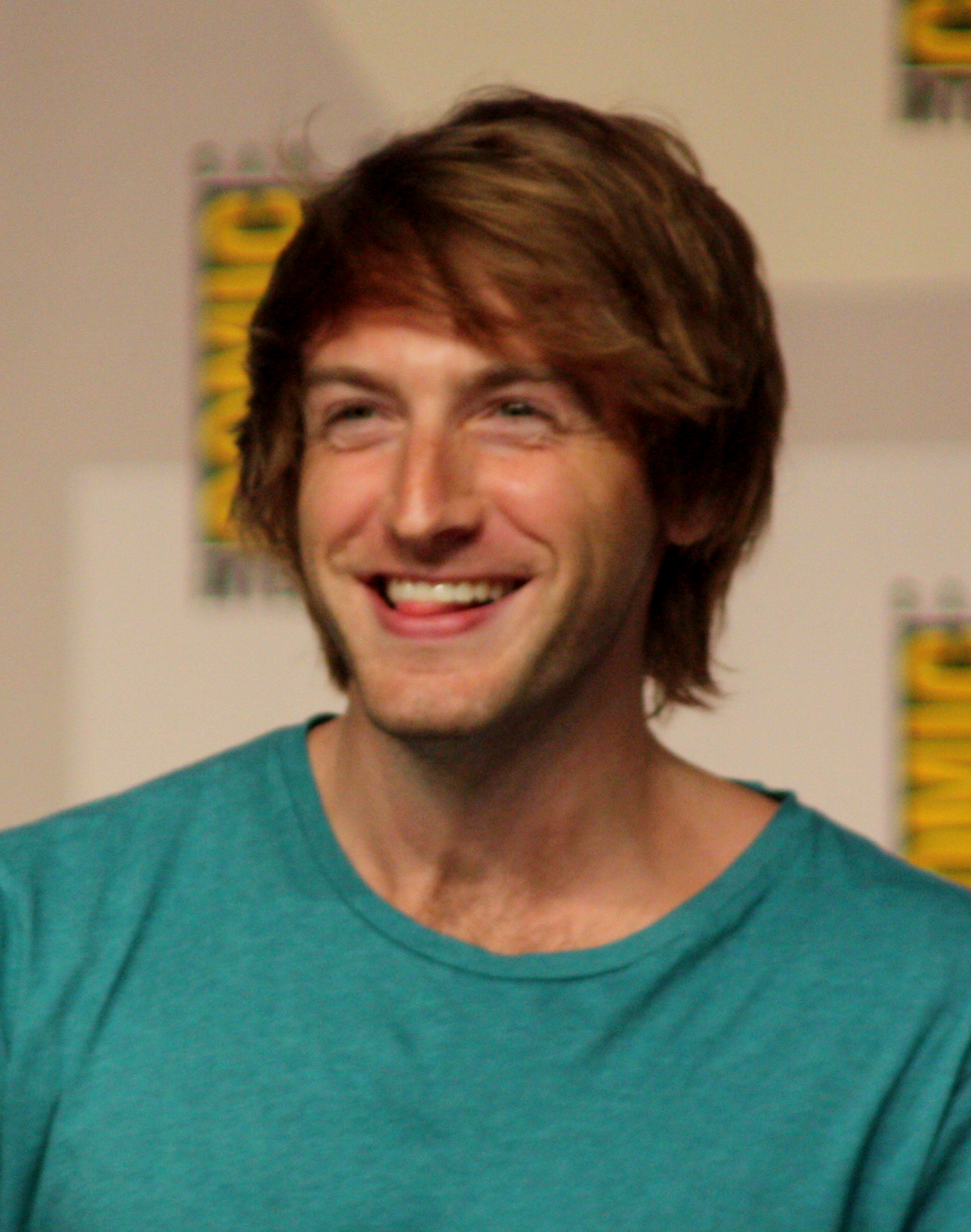
Fran Kranz, Best Original Screenplay winner

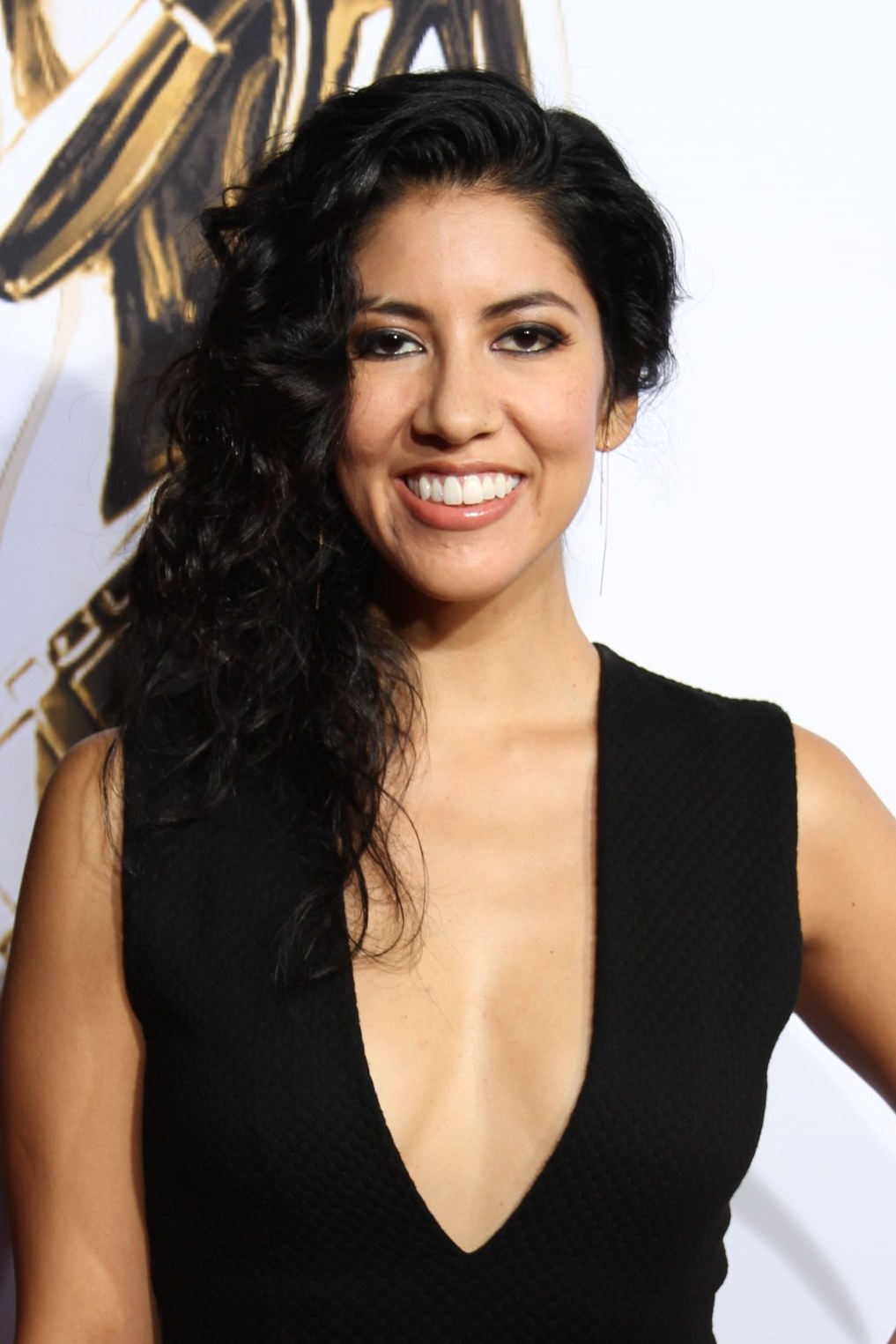
Stephanie Beatriz, Best Animated or VFX Performance winner

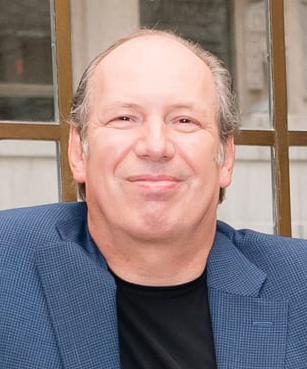
Hans Zimmer, Best Score winner

**Best Picture**: **CODA**; Being the Ricardos; Belfast; Dune; King Richard; Last Night in Soho; Licorice Pizza; The Power of the Dog; Spencer; tick, tick... BOOM!	**Best Director**: **Jane Campion – The Power of the Dog (TIE)**; **Denis Villeneuve – Dune (TIE)**; Guillermo del Toro – Nightmare Alley; Kenneth Branagh – Belfast; Lin-Manuel Miranda – tick, tick... BOOM!; Pablo Larraín – Spencer; Rebecca Hall – Passing; Reinaldo Marcus Green – King Richard; Sian Heder – CODA; Steven Spielberg – West Side Story
**Best Actor**: **Andrew Garfield – tick, tick... BOOM! as Jonathan Larson**; Benedict Cumberbatch – The Power of the Dog as Phil Burbank; Nicolas Cage – Pig as Robin "Rob" Feld; Peter Dinklage – Cyrano as Cyrano de Bergerac; Will Smith – King Richard as Richard Williams	**Best Actress**: **Kristen Stewart – Spencer as Diana Spencer**; Emilia Jones – CODA as Ruby Rossi; Jessica Chastain – The Eyes of Tammy Faye as Tammy Faye; Lady Gaga – House of Gucci as Patrizia Reggiani; Nicole Kidman – Being the Ricardos as Lucille Ball
**Best Supporting Actor**: **Troy Kotsur – CODA as Frank Rossi**; Ciarán Hinds – Belfast as Pop; Jamie Dornan – Belfast as Pa; Jason Isaacs – Mass as Jay Perry; Robin de Jesús – tick, tick... BOOM! as Michael	**Best Supporting Actress**: **Ariana DeBose – West Side Story as Anita**; Aunjanue Ellis – King Richard as Oracene "Brandy" Price; Caitríona Balfe – Belfast as Ma; Marlee Matlin – CODA as Jackie Rossi; Ruth Negga – Passing as Clare Bellew
**Best Cast Ensemble**: **Belfast**; CODA; Don't Look Up; The Harder They Fall; King Richard	**Best Animated or VFX Performance**: **Stephanie Beatriz – Encanto as Mirabel Madrigal**; Abbi Jacobson – The Mitchells vs. the Machines as Katie Mitchell; Jacob Tremblay – Luca as Luca Paguro; John Leguizamo – Encanto as Bruno Madrigal; Sylvester Stallone – The Suicide Squad as Nanaue / King Shark
**Best Original Screenplay**: **Fran Kranz – Mass**; Aaron Sorkin – Being the Ricardos; Edgar Wright and Krysty Wilson-Cairns – Last Night in Soho; Kenneth Branagh – Belfast; Zach Baylin – King Richard	**Best Adapted Screenplay**: **Sian Heder – CODA**; Jane Campion – The Power of the Dog; Maggie Gyllenhaal – The Lost Daughter; Rebecca Hall – Passing; Steven Levenson – tick, tick... BOOM!
**Best Action Film**: **The Harder They Fall**; No Time to Die; Nobody; Shang-Chi and the Legend of the Ten Rings; The Suicide Squad	**Best Animated Film**: **The Mitchells vs. the Machines**; Encanto; Flee; Luca; Raya and the Last Dragon
**Best Comedy or Musical**: **tick, tick... BOOM!**; Cyrano; Free Guy; In the Heights; West Side Story	**Best Documentary**: **Summer of Soul (...Or, When the Revolution Could Not Be Televised)**; Flee; The Rescue; The Sparks Brothers; Val
**Best Horror**: **Last Night in Soho**; Fear Street Trilogy; Malignant; The Night House; A Quiet Place Part II	**Best Indie Film**: **Pig**; CODA; Mass; Shiva Baby; Spencer
**Best International Film**: **Drive My Car**; Flee; A Hero; Titane; The Worst Person in the World	**Best First Feature**: **Lin-Manuel Miranda – tick, tick... BOOM!**; Fran Kranz – Mass; Maggie Gyllenhaal – The Lost Daughter; Michael Sarnoski – Pig; Rebecca Hall – Passing
**Best Short Film**: **Us Again**; Blush; Far from the Tree; Nona; Robin Robin	**Best Score**: **Hans Zimmer – Dune**; Alexandre Desplat – The French Dispatch; Jonny Greenwood – The Power of the Dog; Jonny Greenwood – Spencer; Steven Price – Last Night in Soho
**Best Original Song**: **"Be Alive", sung by Beyoncé – King Richard**; "Beyond the Shore", sung by Emilia Jones – CODA; "Down to Joy", sung by Van Morrison – Belfast; "Every Letter", sung by Peter Dinklage, Haley Bennett, and Kelvin Harrison Jr. – Cyrano; "No Time to Die", sung by Billie Eilish – No Time to Die	**Best Cinematography**: **Greig Fraser – Dune**; Andrew Droz Palermo – The Green Knight; Ari Wegner – The Power of the Dog; Claire Mathon – Spencer; Janusz Kamiński – West Side Story
**Best Production Design**: **Tamara Deverell – Nightmare Alley**; Adam Stockhausen – The French Dispatch; Guy Hendrix Dyas – Spencer; Marcus Rowland – Last Night in Soho; Patrice Vermette – Dune	**Best Film Editing**: **Paul Machliss – Last Night in Soho**; Andrew Weisblum and Myron I. Kerstein – tick, tick... BOOM!; Joe Walker – Dune; Pamela Martin – King Richard; Úna Ní Dhonghaíle – Belfast
**Best Stunts**: **Shang-Chi and the Legend of the Ten Rings**; Black Widow; Dune; No Time to Die; Nobody	**Best Costume Design**: **Jenny Beavan – Cruella**; Bob Morgan and Jacqueline West – Dune; Jacqueline Durran – Spencer; Janty Yates – House of Gucci; Odile Dicks-Mireaux – Last Night in Soho
**Best Hair & Makeup**: **Justin Raleigh, Linda Dowds, and Stephanie Ingram – The Eyes of Tammy Faye**; Ana Lozano, David Craig Forrest, Kim Santantonio, Kyra Panchenko, Michael Ornelaz, Teressa Hill, and Yvonne DePatis Kupka – Being the Ricardos; Carolyn Cousins and Nadia Stacey – Cruella; Donald Mowat, Eva von Bahr, and Love Larson – Dune; Frederic Aspiras, Jana Carboni, Giuliano Mariano, Göran Lundström, and Sarah Nicole Tanno – House of Gucci	**Best Visual Effects**: **Brian Connor, Gerd Nefzer, Paul Lambert, and Tristan Myles – Dune**; Daniele Bigi, Matt Aitken, Neil Corbould, and Stephane Ceretti – Eternals; Bryan Grill, Dan Sudick, Nikos Kalaitzidis, and Swen Gillberg – Free Guy; Christopher Townsend, Dan Oliver, Joe Farrell, and Sean Noel Walker – Shang-Chi and the Legend of the Ten Rings; Dan Sudick, Guy Williams, Jonathan Fawkner, and Kelvin McIlwain – The Suicide Squad

== Honorary awards ==
- Newcomer Award – Jude Hill
- Inspire Award – Aunjanue Ellis
- Game Changer Award – Simu Liu
- Spotlight Award – The Cast of CODA
- Star on the Rise Award – Saniyya Sidney
- International Icon Award – Javier Bardem
- Artisan on the Rise Award – Alice Brooks
- Acting Achievement Award – Nicolas Cage
- Artisans Achievement Award – Greig Fraser
- Filmmaker on the Rise Award – Natalie Morales
- Excellence in Artistry Award – Kenneth Branagh
- Filmmaking Achievement Award – Guillermo del Toro

== Films with multiple wins ==
The following films received multiple awards:

Wins	Film
4	Dune
3	CODA
3	tick, tick... BOOM!
2	Last Night in Soho

== Films with multiple nominations ==
The following films received multiple nominations:

Nominations	Film
10	Dune
9	Belfast
9	CODA
8	King Richard
8	Spencer
8	tick, tick... BOOM!
7	Last Night in Soho
6	The Power of the Dog
4	Being the Ricardos
4	Mass
4	Passing
4	West Side Story
3	Cyrano
3	Encanto
3	Flee
3	House of Gucci
3	No Time to Die
3	Pig
3	Shang-Chi and the Legend of the Ten Rings
3	The Suicide Squad
2	Cruella
2	The Eyes of Tammy Faye
2	Free Guy
2	The French Dispatch
2	The Harder They Fall
2	The Lost Daughter
2	Luca
2	The Mitchells vs. the Machines
2	Nightmare Alley
2	Nobody

== See also ==
- 1st Hollywood Critics Association TV Awards
