= 2021 St. Louis Film Critics Association Awards =

Annual US film awards ceremony

18th StLFCA Awards

December 19, 2021

Best Film:
Licorice Pizza

The nominees for the 18th St. Louis Film Critics Association Awards were announced on December 12, 2021. The winners were announced on December 19, 2021.

== Winners and nominees ==
=== Best Film ===
- Licorice Pizza
  - Belfast
  - The Power of the Dog
  - The Tragedy of Macbeth
  - West Side Story

=== Best Actor ===
- Nicolas Cage – Pig
  - Benedict Cumberbatch – The Power of the Dog
  - Andrew Garfield – tick, tick... BOOM!
  - Will Smith – King Richard
  - Denzel Washington – The Tragedy of Macbeth

=== Best Supporting Actor ===
- Kodi Smit-McPhee – The Power of the Dog
  - Ben Affleck – The Last Duel
  - Bradley Cooper – Licorice Pizza
  - Ciarán Hinds – Belfast
  - Jared Leto – House of Gucci

=== Best Original Screenplay ===
- Mass – Fran Kranz
  - Being the Ricardos – Aaron Sorkin
  - Belfast – Kenneth Branagh
  - Licorice Pizza – Paul Thomas Anderson
  - Pig – Michael Sarnoski (screenplay); Vanessa Block and Michael Sarnoski (story)

=== Best Animated Film ===
- The Mitchells vs. the Machines
  - Encanto
  - Flee
  - Luca
  - Vivo

=== Best International Film ===
- Drive My Car • Japan
  - Flee • Denmark
  - The Hand of God • Italy
  - A Hero • Iran
  - Titane • France

=== Best Cinematography ===
- The Power of the Dog – Ari Wegner
  - Belfast – Haris Zambarloukos
  - Dune – Greig Fraser
  - The Tragedy of Macbeth – Bruno Delbonnel
  - West Side Story – Janusz Kamiński

=== Best Costume Design ===
- Cruella – Jenny Beavan
  - Dune – Robert Morgan and Jacqueline West
  - House of Gucci – Janty Yates
  - Last Night in Soho – Odile Dicks-Mireaux
  - Spencer – Jacqueline Durran

=== Best Score ===
- Dune – Hans Zimmer
  - Don't Look Up – Nicholas Britell
  - The Power of the Dog – Jonny Greenwood
  - Spencer – Jonny Greenwood
  - The Tragedy of Macbeth – Carter Burwell

=== Best Visual Effects ===
- Dune – Brian Connor, Paul Lambert, Tristan Myles, and Gerd Nefzer
  - Black Widow – Geoffrey Baumann, Paul Corbould, Craig Hammack, and Dave Hodgins
  - Finch – Burt Dalton and Scott Stokdyk
  - Free Guy – Swen Gillberg, Bryan Grill, Nikos Kalaitzidis, and Dan Sudick
  - The Tragedy of Macbeth – Michael Huber and Alex Lemke

=== Best Comedy Film ===
- Licorice Pizza
  - Don't Look Up
  - Free Guy
  - The French Dispatch
  - The Mitchells vs. the Machines

=== Best Scene ===
- Licorice Pizza – Driving in reverse
  - Belfast – Buddy freezes as the rioters approach
  - Last Night in Soho – Eloise and Sandi share a dance with Jack
  - tick, tick... BOOM! – Sunday brunch at the diner
  - West Side Story – "America"

=== Best Director ===
- Jane Campion – The Power of the Dog
  - Paul Thomas Anderson – Licorice Pizza
  - Wes Anderson – The French Dispatch
  - Kenneth Branagh – Belfast
  - Steven Spielberg – West Side Story
  - Denis Villeneuve – Dune

=== Best Actress ===
- Kristen Stewart – Spencer
  - Jessica Chastain – The Eyes of Tammy Faye
  - Olivia Colman – The Lost Daughter
  - Lady Gaga – House of Gucci
  - Nicole Kidman – Being the Ricardos

=== Best Supporting Actress ===
- Ann Dowd – Mass
  - Kirsten Dunst – The Power of the Dog
  - Aunjanue Ellis-Taylor – King Richard
  - Rita Moreno – West Side Story
  - Ruth Negga – Passing

=== Best Adapted Screenplay ===
- The Power of the Dog – Jane Campion; based on the novel by Thomas Savage
  - CODA – Sian Heder; based on the film La Famille Bélier (scenario by Victoria Bedos and Stanislas Carré de Malberg, screenplay by Éric Lartigau and Thomas Bidegain)
  - Drive My Car – Ryusuke Hamaguchi and Takamasa Oe; based on the short story by Haruki Murakami
  - Dune – Eric Roth, Jon Spaihts, and Denis Villeneuve; based on the novel by Frank Herbert
  - West Side Story – Tony Kushner; based on the stage play book by Arthur Laurents

=== Best Documentary Film ===
- Flee
  - The Rescue
  - Summer of Soul
  - Tina
  - The Velvet Underground

=== Best Ensemble ===
- Mass
  - Being the Ricardos
  - Belfast
  - The French Dispatch
  - Licorice Pizza

=== Best Editing ===
- Last Night in Soho – Paul Machliss
  - Belfast – Úna Ní Dhonghaíle
  - Dune – Joe Walker
  - Licorice Pizza – Andy Jurgensen
  - West Side Story – Sarah Broshar and Michael Kahn

=== Best Production Design ===
- The French Dispatch – Adam Stockhausen
  - Dune – Patrice Vermette
  - Last Night in Soho – Marcus Rowland
  - Nightmare Alley – Tamara Deverell
  - West Side Story – Adam Stockhausen

=== Best Soundtrack ===
- Cruella
  - Last Night in Soho
  - Licorice Pizza
  - The Tender Bar
  - West Side Story

=== Best Action Film ===
- Shang-Chi and the Legend of the Ten Rings
  - Black Widow
  - Free Guy
  - Nobody
  - No Time to Die

=== Best Horror Film ===
- A Quiet Place Part II
  - Candyman
  - Lamb
  - Last Night in Soho
  - Titane
