= 2021 Seattle Film Critics Society Awards =

Annual US film awards ceremony

6th Seattle Film Critics Society Awards
- Date: January 17, 2022
- Site: Seattle, Washington

Highlights
- Best Picture: Drive My Car
- Most awards: Drive My Car (4)
- Most nominations: The Power of the Dog (11)

The 6th Seattle Film Critics Society Awards were announced on January 17, 2022.

The nominations were announced on January 10, 2022, with The Power of the Dog leading the nominations with eleven, followed by Dune with ten and The Green Knight with nine.

Drive My Car received the most awards with four wins, including Best Picture, Best Director and Best Screenplay. Dune and The Green Knight also received multiple awards with three wins each.

== Winners and nominees ==
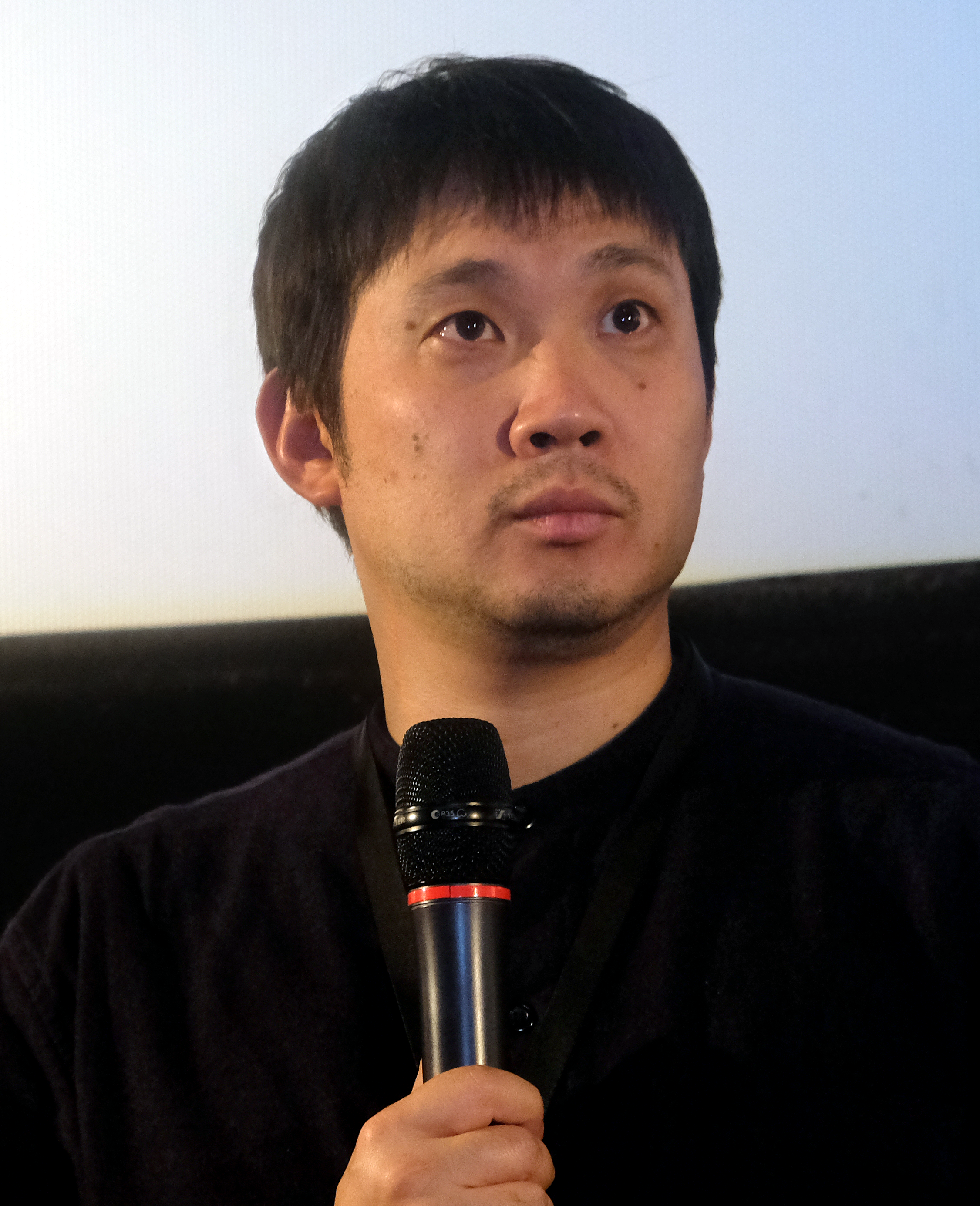
Ryusuke Hamaguchi, Best Director and Best Film Not in the English Language winner, and Best Screenplay co-winner

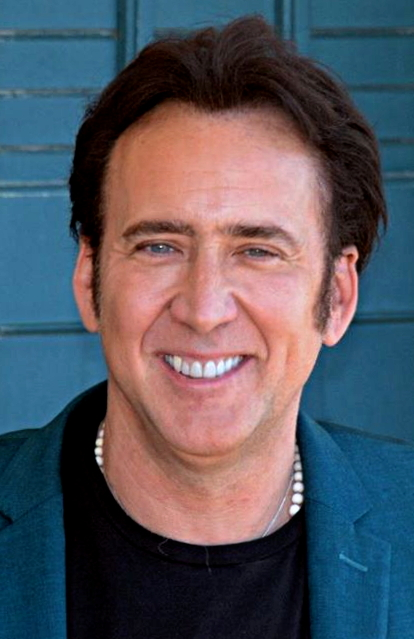
Nicolas Cage, Best Actor winner

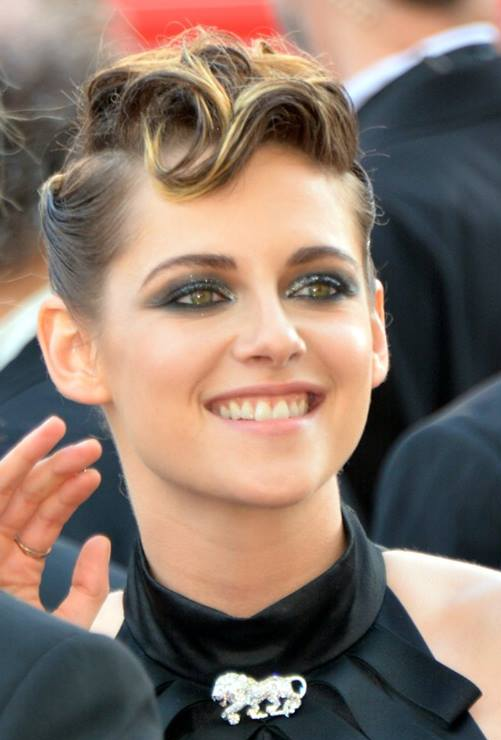
Kristen Stewart, Best Actress winner

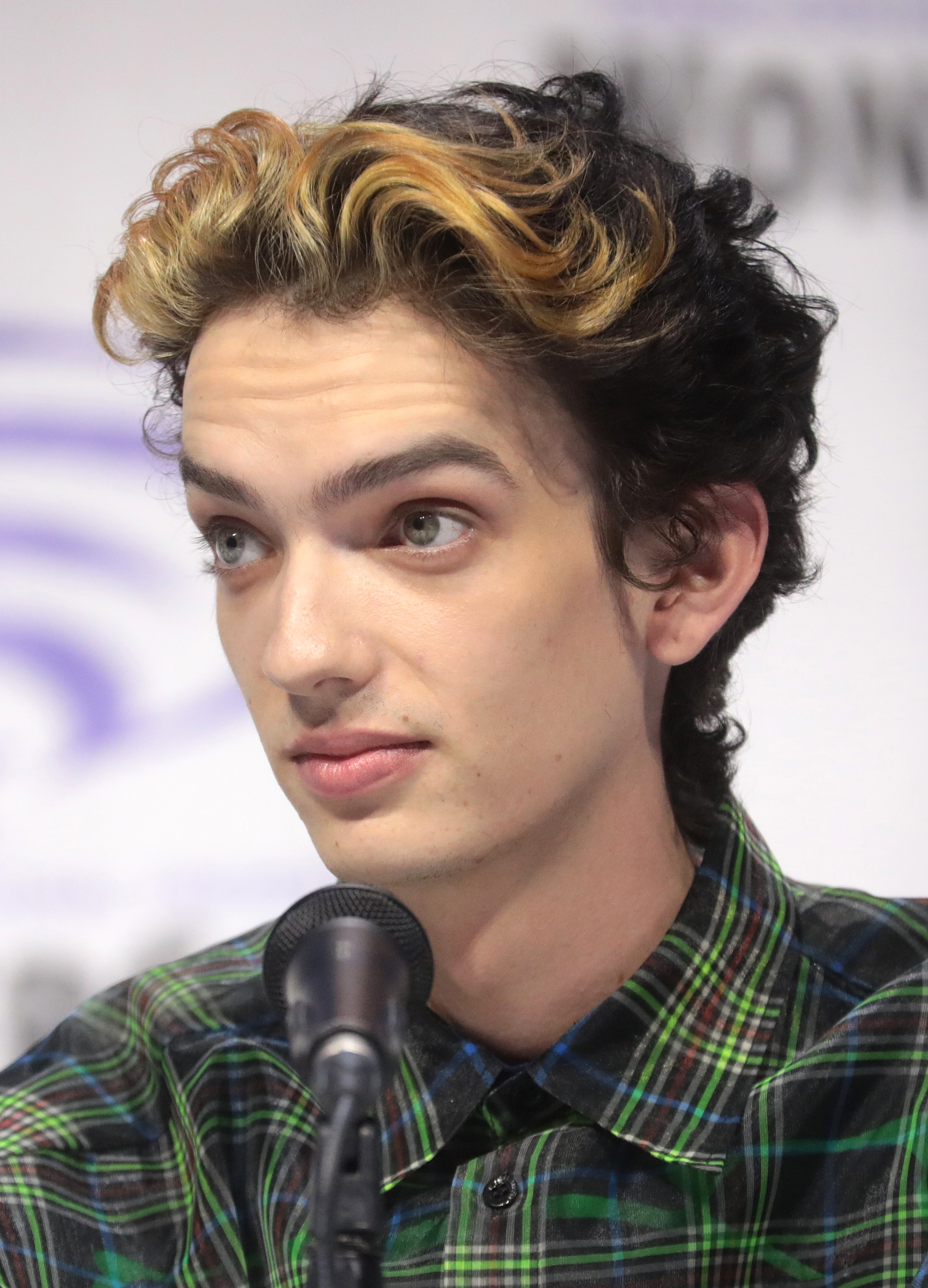
Kodi Smit-McPhee, Best Supporting Actor winner

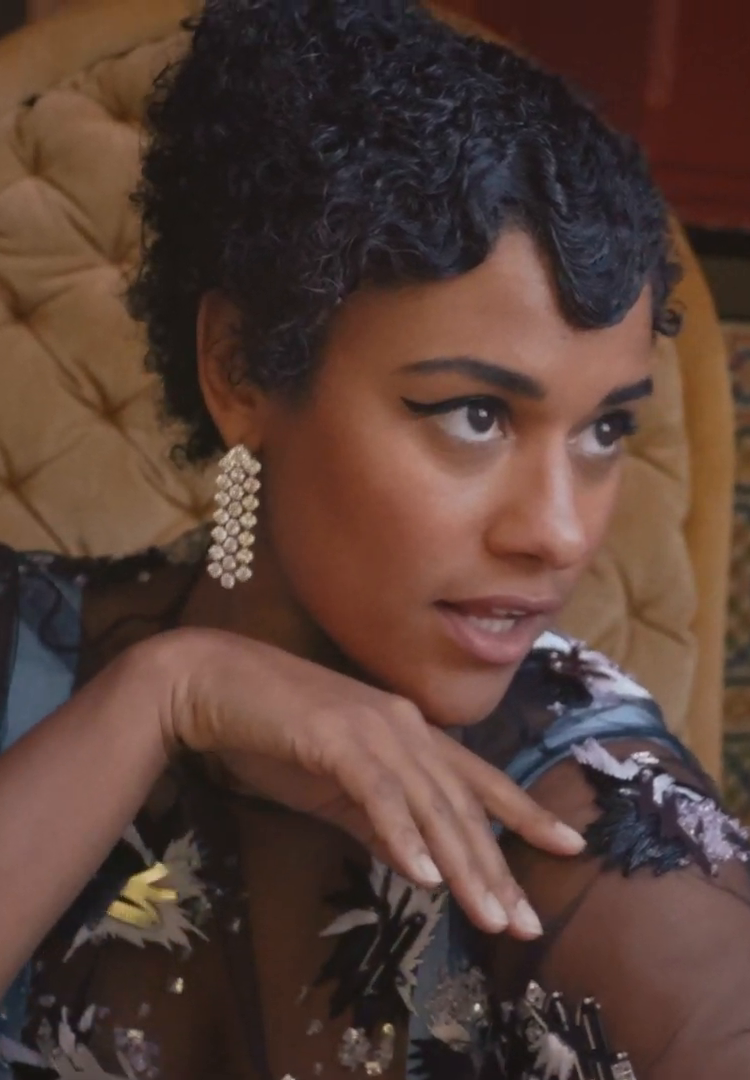
Ariana DeBose, Best Supporting Actress winner

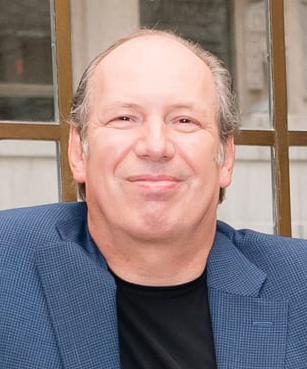
Hans Zimmer, Best Original Score winner

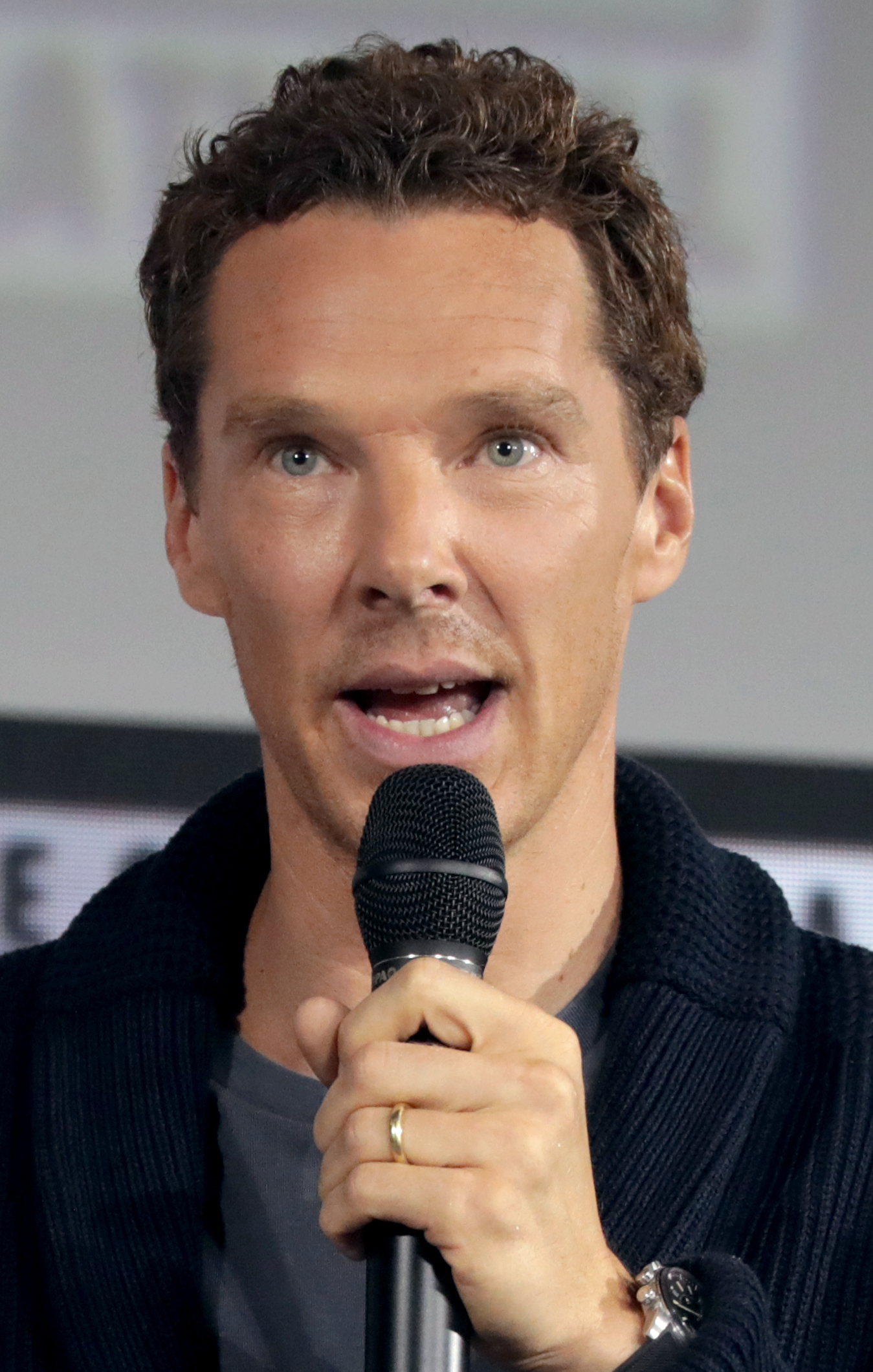
Benedict Cumberbatch, Best Villain winner

Winners are listed first and highlighted in bold.

**Best Picture of the Year**: **Drive My Car (Janus Films)**; CODA (Apple TV+); Dune (Warner Bros.); The Green Knight (A24); In the Heights (Warner Bros.); Licorice Pizza (MGM / United Artists Releasing); Pig (Neon); The Power of the Dog (Netflix); Titane (Neon); West Side Story (20th Century Studios)	**Best Director**: **Ryusuke Hamaguchi – Drive My Car**; Jane Campion – The Power of the Dog; Julia Ducournau – Titane; David Lowery – The Green Knight; Denis Villeneuve – Dune
**Best Actor in a Leading Role**: **Nicolas Cage – Pig as Robin "Rob" Feld**; Benedict Cumberbatch – The Power of the Dog as Phil Burbank; Andrew Garfield – tick, tick... BOOM! as Jonathan Larson; Dev Patel – The Green Knight as Sir Gawain; Simon Rex – Red Rocket as Mikey Davies/Saber	**Best Actress in a Leading Role**: **Kristen Stewart – Spencer as Diana, Princess of Wales**; Lady Gaga – House of Gucci as Patrizia Reggiani; Alana Haim – Licorice Pizza as Alana Kane; Renate Reinsve – The Worst Person in the World as Julie; Agathe Rousselle – Titane as Alexia / Adrien
**Best Actor in a Supporting Role**: **Kodi Smit-McPhee – The Power of the Dog as Peter Gordon**; Colman Domingo – Zola as Abegunde "X" Olawale; Troy Kotsur – CODA as Frank Rossi; Vincent Lindon – Titane as Vincent; Jeffrey Wright – The French Dispatch as Roebuck Wright	**Best Actress in a Supporting Role**: **Ariana DeBose – West Side Story as Anita**; Ann Dowd – Mass as Linda; Kirsten Dunst – The Power of the Dog as Rose Gordon; Aunjanue Ellis – King Richard as Oracene "Brandy" Price; Ruth Negga – Passing as Clare Bellew
**Best Ensemble Cast**: **Mass – Henry Russell Bergstein and Allison Estrin (casting directors)**; Dune – Jina Jay and Francine Maisler (casting directors); In the Heights – Tiffany Little Canfield and Bernard Telsey (casting directors); Licorice Pizza – Cassandra Kulukundis (casting director); The Power of the Dog – Nikki Barrett, Tina Cleary, Carmen Cuba, and Nina Gold (casting directors)	**Best Action Choreography**: **In the Heights**; No Time to Die; Nobody; Raging Fire; Shang-Chi and the Legend of the Ten Rings
**Best Screenplay**: **Drive My Car – Ryusuke Hamaguchi and Takamasa Oe**; The Green Knight – David Lowery; Mass – Fran Kranz; Pig – Michael Sarnoski; The Power of the Dog – Jane Campion	**Best Animated Feature**: **Flee (Neon) – Jonas Poher Rasmussen (director)**; Encanto (Walt Disney Pictures) – Jared Bush and Byron Howard (directors); Charise Castro Smith (co-director); Luca (Walt Disney Pictures) – Enrico Casarosa (director); The Mitchells vs. the Machines (Netflix) – Mike Rianda (director); Jeff Rowe (co-director); Raya and the Last Dragon (Walt Disney Pictures) – Don Hall and Carlos López Estrada (directors); Paul Briggs and John Ripa (co-directors)
**Best Documentary Feature**: **Summer of Soul (...Or, When the Revolution Could Not Be Televised) (Hulu) – Ahmir "Questlove" Thompson (director)**; Billie Eilish: The World's a Little Blurry (Apple TV+) – R. J. Cutler (director); Flee (Neon) – Jonas Poher Rasmussen (director); The Rescue (National Geographic Documentary Films / Greenwich Entertainment) – Jimmy Chin and Elizabeth Chai Vasarhelyi (directors); Woodlands Dark and Days Bewitched: A History of Folk Horror (Severin Films) – Kier-La Janisse (director)	**Best Film Not in the English Language**: **Drive My Car (Janus Films) – Ryusuke Hamaguchi (director)**; Flee (Neon) – Jonas Poher Rasmussen (director); The Hand of God (Netflix) – Paolo Sorrentino (director); Titane (Neon) – Julia Ducournau (director); The Worst Person in the World (Neon) – Joachim Trier (director)
**Best Cinematography**: **The Green Knight – Andrew Droz Palermo**; Dune – Greig Fraser; The Power of the Dog – Ari Wegner; The Tragedy of Macbeth – Bruno Delbonnel; West Side Story – Janusz Kamiński	**Best Costume Design**: **The Green Knight – Malgosia Turzanska**; Cruella – Jenny Beavan; Dune – Jacqueline West and Robert Morgan; House of Gucci – Janty Yates; Spencer – Jacqueline Durran
**Best Film Editing**: **Dune – Joe Walker**; Drive My Car – Azusa Yamazaki; The Power of the Dog – Peter Sciberras; Titane – Jean-Christophe Bouzy; West Side Story – Michael Kahn and Sarah Broshar	**Best Original Score**: **Dune – Hans Zimmer**; The French Dispatch – Alexandre Desplat; The Green Knight – Daniel Hart; The Power of the Dog – Jonny Greenwood; Spencer – Jonny Greenwood
**Best Production Design**: **The Green Knight – Jade Healy (Production Design); Jenny Oman (Set Decoration)**; Dune – Patrice Vermette (Production Design); Zsuzsanna Sipos (Set Decoration); The French Dispatch – Adam Stockhausen (Production Design); Rena DeAngelo (Set Decoration); Nightmare Alley – Tamara Deverell (Production Design); Shane Vieau (Set Decoration); West Side Story – Adam Stockhausen (Production Design); Rena DeAngelo (Set Decoration)	**Best Visual Effects**: **Dune – Paul Lambert, Tristan Myles, Brian Connor, and Gerd Nefzer**; The Green Knight – Eric Saindon and Michael Cozens; The Matrix Resurrections – Dan Glass, Huw J. Evans, Tom Debenham, and J. D. Schwalm; Shang-Chi and the Legend of the Ten Rings – Christopher Townsend, Joe Farrell, Sean Noel Walker, and Dan Oliver; Spider-Man: No Way Home – Kelly Port, Chris Waegner, Scott Edelstein, and Dan Sudick
**Best Youth Performance**: **Emilia Jones – CODA as Ruby Rossi**; Jude Hill – Belfast as Buddy; Cooper Hoffman – Licorice Pizza as Gary Valentine; Woody Norman – C'mon C'mon as Jesse; Joséphine Sanz – Petite Maman as Nelly	**Best Villain**: **Phil Burbank – The Power of the Dog (portrayed by Benedict Cumberbatch)**; Rufus Buck – The Harder They Fall (portrayed by Idris Elba); Baron Vladimir Harkonnen – Dune (portrayed by Stellan Skarsgård); Norman Osborn / Green Goblin – Spider-Man: No Way Home (portrayed by Willem Dafoe); Xu Wenwu – Shang-Chi and the Legend of the Ten Rings (portrayed by Tony Leung)
