= London Film Critics' Circle Award for Technical Achievement =

British film award

The London Film Critics' Circle Award for Technical Achievement or Technical Achievement Award is an annual award given by the London Film Critics' Circle.

== Winners ==
=== 2010s ===
Year	Technical(s)	Film(s)
2011	Maria Djurkovic – production design	Tinker Tailor Soldier Spy
2012	Bill Westenhofer – visual effects	Life of Pi
2013	Tim Webber – visual effects	Gravity
2014	Mica Levi – score	Under the Skin
2015	Edward Lachman – cinematography	Carol
2016	Sturla Brandth Grøvlen – cinematography	Victoria
2017	Dennis Gassner – production design	Blade Runner 2049
2018	Łukasz Żal – cinematography	Cold War
2019	Barbara Ling – production design	Once Upon a Time in Hollywood

=== 2020s ===
Year	Technical(s)	Film(s)
2020	Lucy Pardee – casting	Rocks
2021	Brian Connor, Paul Lambert, Tristan Myles and Gerd Nefzer – visual effects	Dune
2022	Brian Leif Hansen and Guillermo del Toro – animation	Guillermo del Toro's Pinocchio
2023	Mica Levi and Johnnie Burn – music & sound	The Zone of Interest
2024	Jomo Fray – cinematography	Nickel Boys
2025	Ludwig Göransson – music	Sinners

== Multiple wins ==
2 wins

- Mica Levi
