= Houston Film Critics Society Awards 2021 =

American film awards

15th Houston Film Critics Society Awards
- Date: January 19, 2022
- Location: Museum of Fine Arts, Houston, Texas
- Presented by: Houston Film Critics Society
- Website: houstonfilmcritics.com

The 15th Houston Film Critics Society Awards were announced on January 19, 2022, at the Museum of Fine Arts, Houston (MFAH) in Texas. The nominations were announced on January 3, 2022, with The Power of the Dog leading the nominations with nine.

The nominees for the Texas Independent Film Award were announced on December 3, 2021.

== Winners and nominees ==
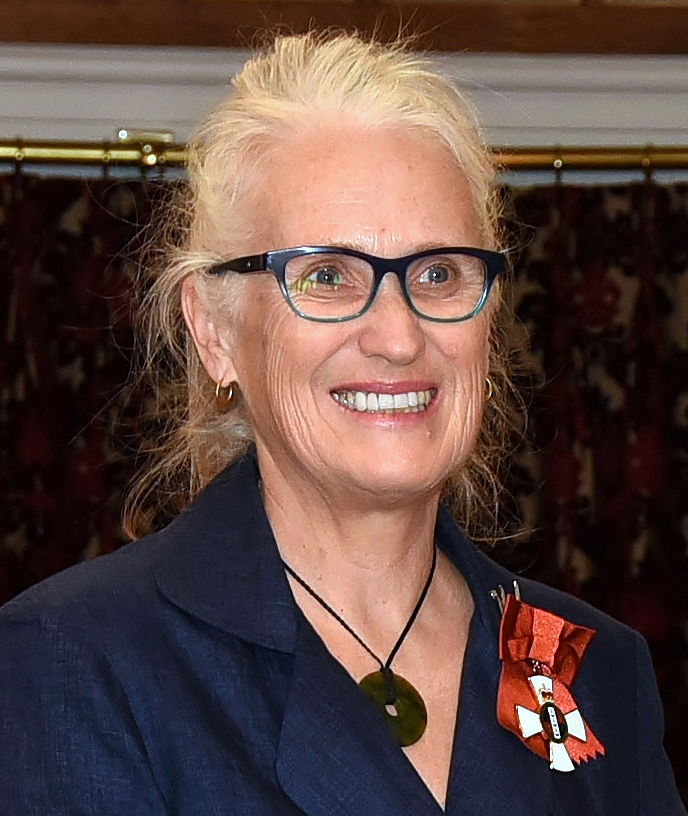
Jane Campion, Best Director and Best Screenplay winner

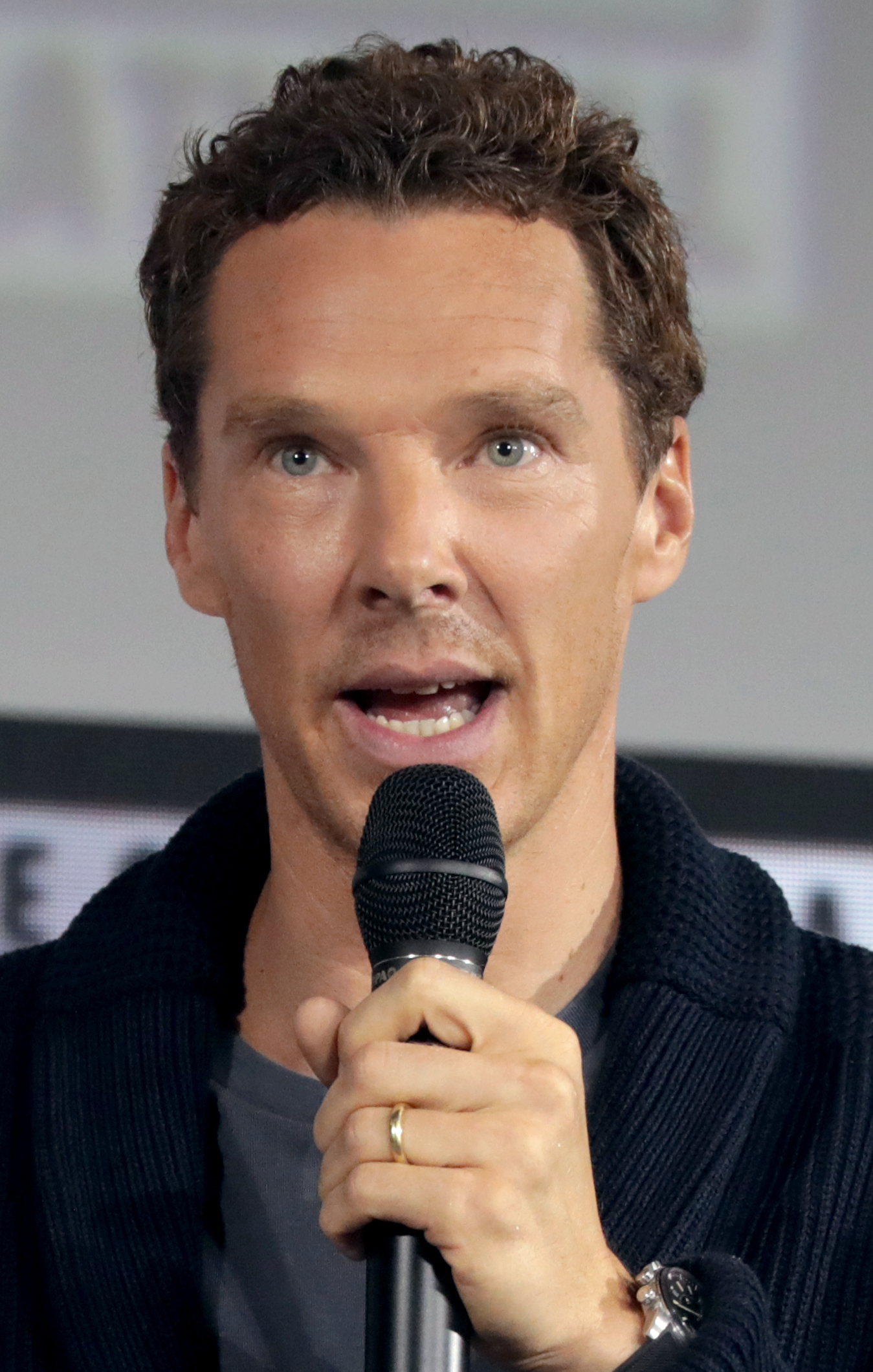
Benedict Cumberbatch, Best Actor winner

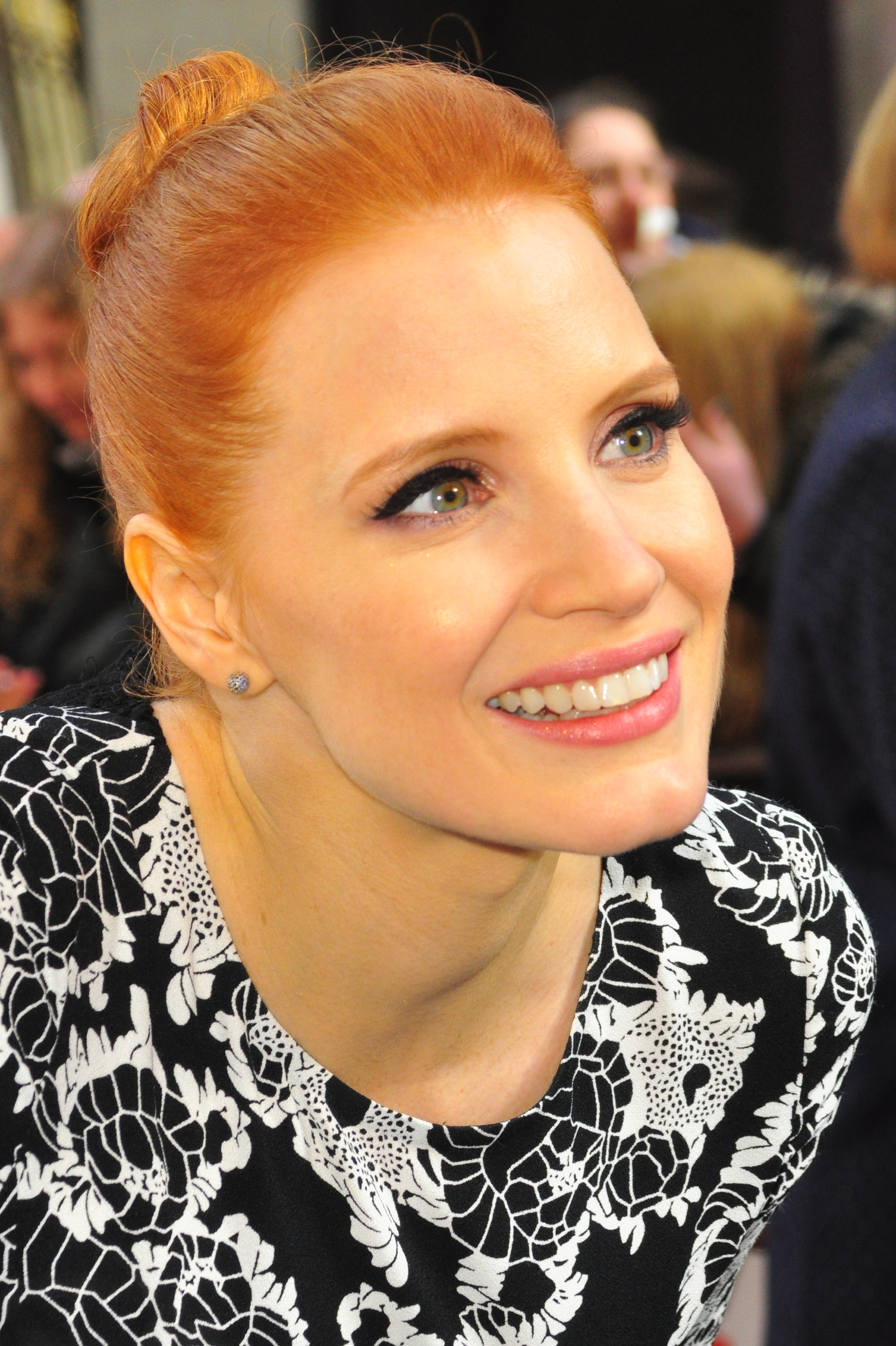
Jessica Chastain, Best Actress winner

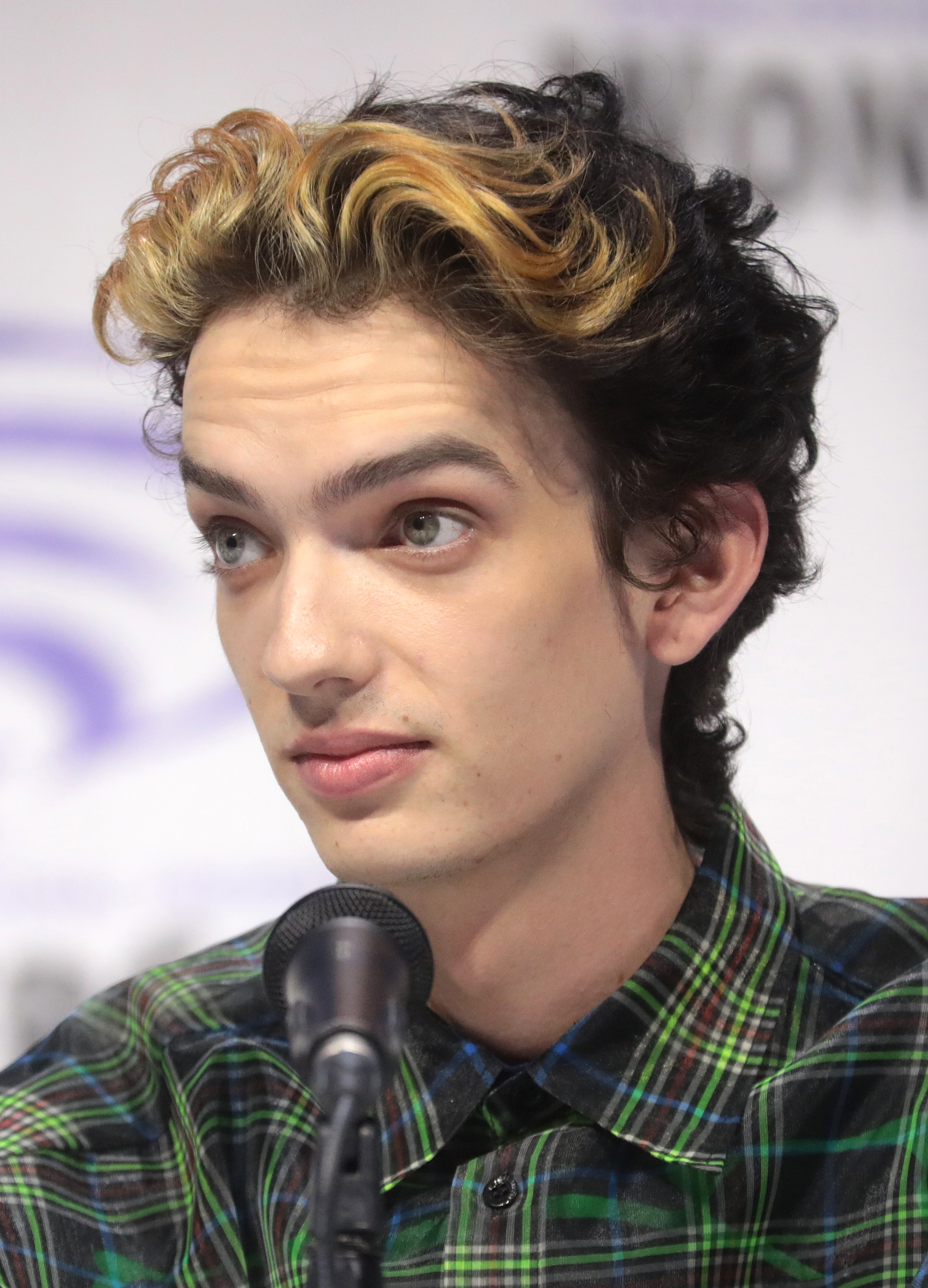
Kodi Smit-McPhee, Best Supporting Actor winner

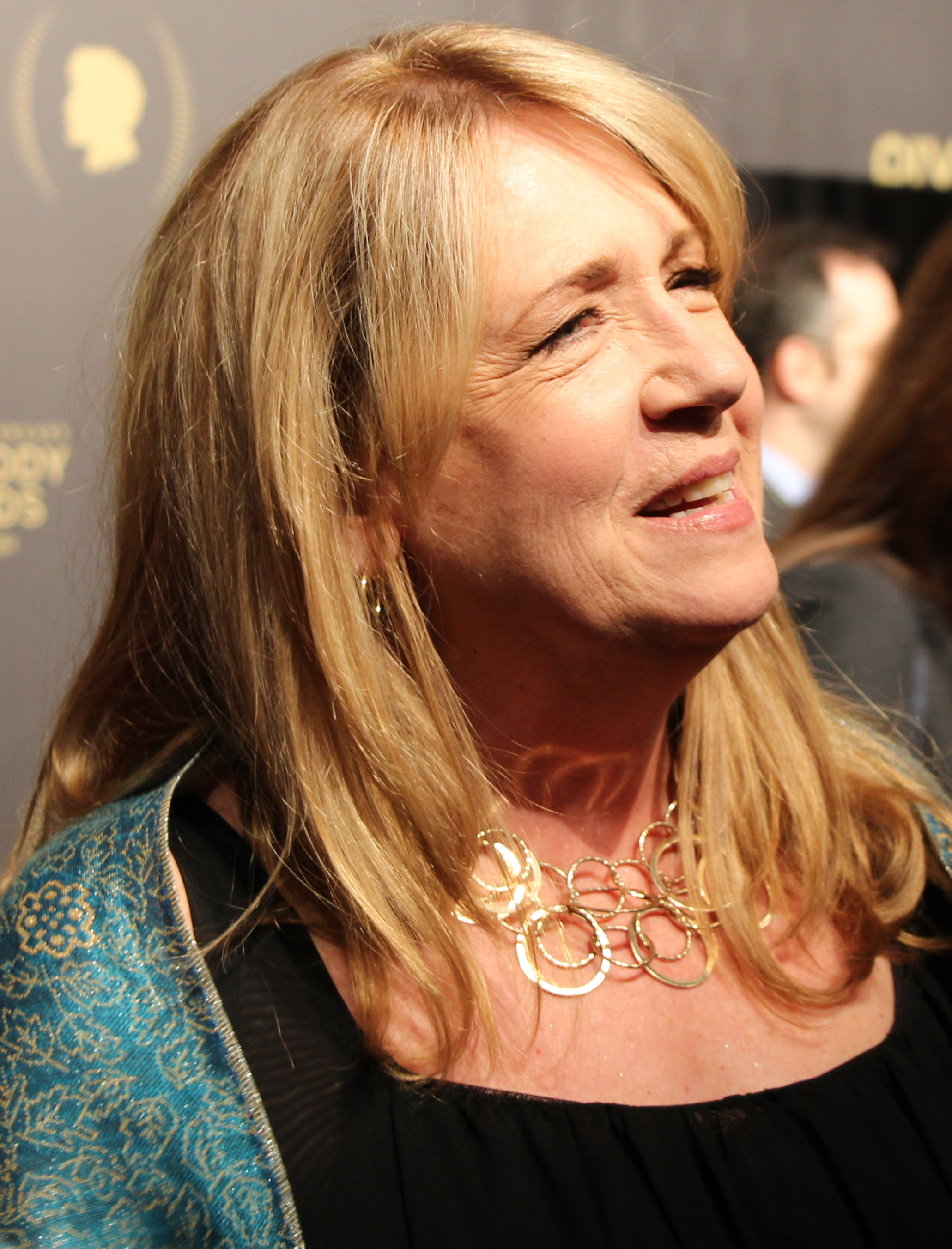
Ann Dowd, Best Supporting Actress winner

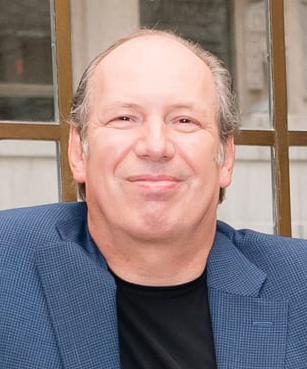
Hans Zimmer, Best Original Score co-winner

Winners are listed first and highlighted with boldface.

Best Picture	Best Director
**The Power of the Dog**; Belfast; CODA; Don't Look Up; Dune; King Richard; Licorice Pizza; Parallel Mothers; tick, tick... BOOM!; The Tragedy of Macbeth	**Jane Campion – The Power of the Dog**; Paul Thomas Anderson – Licorice Pizza; Kenneth Branagh – Belfast; Guillermo del Toro – Nightmare Alley; Denis Villeneuve – Dune
Best Actor	Best Actress
**Benedict Cumberbatch – The Power of the Dog as Phil Burbank**; Peter Dinklage – Cyrano as Cyrano de Bergerac; Andrew Garfield – tick, tick... BOOM! as Jonathan Larson; Will Smith – King Richard as Richard Williams; Denzel Washington – The Tragedy of Macbeth as Lord Macbeth	**Jessica Chastain – The Eyes of Tammy Faye as Tammy Faye Bakker**; Olivia Colman – The Lost Daughter as Leda Caruso; Penélope Cruz – Parallel Mothers as Janis Martinez; Alana Haim – Licorice Pizza as Alana Kane; Emilia Jones – CODA as Ruby Rossi; Kristen Stewart – Spencer as Diana, Princess of Wales
Best Supporting Actor	Best Supporting Actress
**Kodi Smit-McPhee – The Power of the Dog as Peter Gordon**; Andrew Garfield – The Eyes of Tammy Faye as Jim Bakker; Ciarán Hinds – Belfast as Pop; Troy Kotsur – CODA as Frank Rossi; J. K. Simmons – Being the Ricardos as William Frawley	**Ann Dowd – Mass as Linda**; Jessie Buckley – The Lost Daughter as Young Leda Caruso; Ariana DeBose – West Side Story as Anita; Kirsten Dunst – The Power of the Dog as Rose Gordon; Aunjanue Ellis – King Richard as Oracene "Brandy" Price
Best Screenplay	Best Animated Feature
**The Power of the Dog – Jane Campion**; Belfast – Kenneth Branagh; CODA – Sian Heder; Don't Look Up – Adam McKay; Licorice Pizza – Paul Thomas Anderson	**The Mitchells vs. the Machines**; Encanto; Flee; Luca; Raya and the Last Dragon
Best Documentary Feature	Best Foreign Language Feature
**Summer of Soul (...Or, When the Revolution Could Not Be Televised)**; Flee; The Rescue; The Sparks Brothers; Val	**Drive My Car (Japan)**; Flee (Denmark); Parallel Mothers (Spain); Riders of Justice (Denmark); The Worst Person in the World (Norway)
Best Original Score	Best Original Song
**Dune – Hans Zimmer (TIE)**; **The Power of the Dog – Jonny Greenwood (TIE)**; The French Dispatch – Alexandre Desplat; The Harder They Fall – Jeymes Samuel; Spencer – Jonny Greenwood	**"Wherever I Fall – Part I" – Cyrano (music by Bryce Dessner and Aaron Dessner; lyrics by Matt Berninger and Carin Besser)**; "Dos Oruguitas" – Encanto; "Guns Go Bang" – The Harder They Fall; "Just Look Up" – Don't Look Up; "No Time to Die" – No Time to Die
Best Cinematography	Best Visual Effects
**Dune – Greig Fraser**; Nightmare Alley – Dan Laustsen; The Power of the Dog – Ari Wegner; The Tragedy of Macbeth – Bruno Delbonnel; West Side Story – Janusz Kamiński	**Dune – Brian Connor, Paul Lambert, Tristan Myles, and Gerd Nefzer**; The Matrix Resurrections; Shang-Chi and the Legend of the Ten Rings
Best Ensemble Cast	Best Stunt Coordination Team
**Mass**; Belfast; CODA; Nightmare Alley; The Power of the Dog	**No Time to Die**; Black Widow; The Matrix Resurrections; Shang-Chi and the Legend of the Ten Rings; Spider-Man: No Way Home
Cinematic Achievement Award
**Well Go USA**
Texas Independent Film Award
**Red Rocket: Sean Baker visits a down-on-his-luck porn star who revisits his Texas City home**; Amaraica: Tim Sparks introduces an undocumented immigrant who wants to be a U.S. citizen; Playing God: Scott Brignac follows brother-and-sister con artists as they plan a big job; Test Pattern: Shatara Michelle Ford considers race, parenthood, and the freedom to choose; 12 Mighty Orphans: Ty Roberts returns to football in Fort Worth during the Great Depression
