= Kalaitzidis =

Kalaitzidis is a surname. Notable people with the surname include:

- Dimitris Kalaitzidis (born 1957), Greek professional football manager
- Dimitris Kalaitzidis (basketball), Greek basketball player
- Nikos Kalaitzidis, Greek-American visual effects artist
