= Zsuzsanna Sipos =

Hungarian set decorator

- Occupation: Set decorator

Zsuzsanna Sipos is a Hungarian set decorator. She won an Academy Award in the category Best Production Design for the film Dune.

== Selected filmography ==
- Dune (2021; co-won the Academy Award with Patrice Vermette)
- The Invitation (2022)
- Dune: Part Two (2024)
- Borderlands (2024)
- Alien: Romulus (2024)

== See also ==
- List of Hungarian Academy Award winners and nominees
