= Love Larson =

Swedish make-up artist and hair stylist

- Born: 11 June 1978 (age 48); Umeå, Västerbottens län, Sweden
- Other name: Love Larsson
- Occupation: Makeup artist
- Years active: 1988-present

Love Larson (born 11 June 1978) is a Swedish make-up artist and hair stylist. He is best known for his works in Skyfall (2012), The 100-Year-Old Man Who Climbed Out the Window and Disappeared (2013), A Man Called Ove (2015), and Dune (2021). He received his first Oscar nomination Academy Award for Best Makeup and Hairstyling at the 88th Academy Awards along with Eva von Bahr.

== Awards and nominations ==
- 2022: Academy Award for Best Makeup and Hairstyling for Dune (nominated)
- 2016: Academy Award for Best Makeup and Hairstyling for A Man Called Ove (nominated)
- 2015: Academy Award for Best Makeup and Hairstyling for The 100-Year-Old Man Who Climbed Out the Window and Disappeared (nominated)
- 2015: Guldbagge Award for Best Makeup and Hair for A Man Called Ove (won)
- 2014: Guldbagge Award for Best Makeup and Hair for The 100-Year-Old Man Who Climbed Out the Window and Disappeared (nominated)
- 2012: Saturn Award for Best Make-up for Skyfall (nominated)

== See also ==
- List of foreign-language films nominated for Academy Awards
