= Nikos Kalaitzidis =

Greek-American visual effects artist

- Occupation: Visual effects artist

Nikos Kalaitzidis is a Greek-American visual effects artist. He was nominated for an Academy Award in the category Best Visual Effects for the film Free Guy.

== Selected filmography ==
- Free Guy (2021; co-nominated with Swen Gillberg, Bryan Grill and Dan Sudick)
- The Mandalorian: Season 3
- Asoka
