= Bob Morgan (costume designer) =

American costume designer

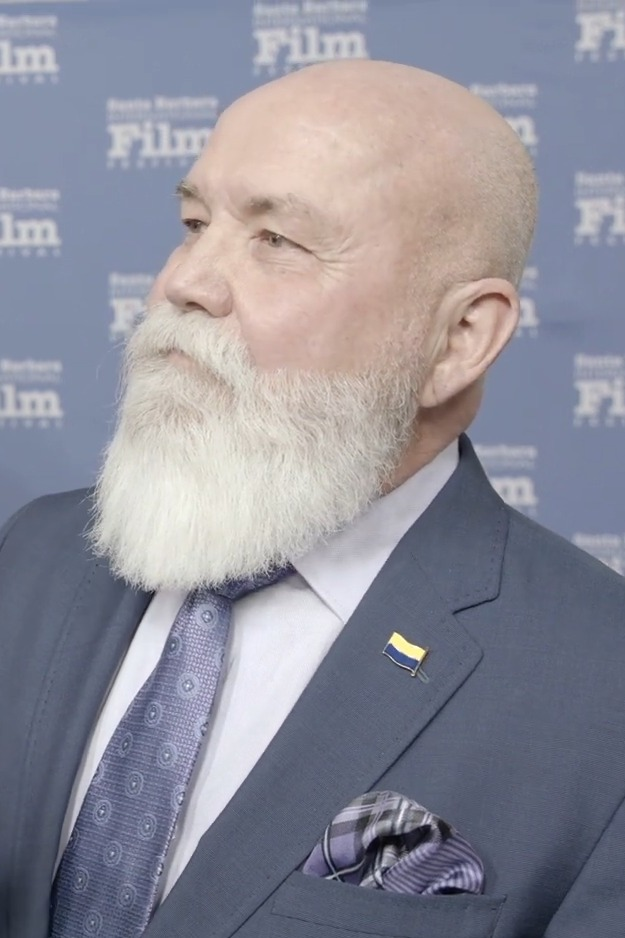
- Morgan in 2022
- Other name: Robert Morgan
- Occupation: Costume designer

Bob Morgan is an American costume designer. He was nominated for an Academy Award in the category Best Costume Design for the film Dune.

== Selected filmography ==
- Dune (2021; co-nominated with Jacqueline West)
