= Gerd Nefzer =

German special effects artist

Gerd Nefzer is a German special effects artist. He won an Academy Award for Best Visual Effects for his work as a special effects supervisor on Blade Runner 2049. He shared the award with John Nelson, Paul Lambert and Richard R. Hoover.

In 2022, Nefzer won his second Academy Award for his work on Dune. He shared this Award with Paul Lambert, Tristan Myles and Brian Connor. He won his third Academy Award in the Visual Effects category in 2025. This time, for his work on Dune: Part Two.
