= Tristan Myles =

English visual effects artist

- Education: Teesside University
- Occupation: Visual effects artist
- Years active: 2001–present

Tristan Myles is an English visual effects artist. He won two Academy Awards in the category Best Visual Effects for the films First Man and Dune.

== Early life ==
Myles was born to Eileen and Michael Shacklady and grew up in Basingstoke. He studied Creative Visualisation at Teesside University.

== Selected filmography ==
- First Man (2018; co-won with Paul Lambert, Ian Hunter and J. D. Schwalm)
- Dune (2021; co-won with Paul Lambert, Brian Connor and Gerd Nefzer)
