= Brian Connor (visual effects artist) =

American visual effects artist

- Occupation: Visual effects artist

Brian Connor is an American visual effects artist. He won an Academy Award in the category Best Visual Effects for the film Dune.

== Selected filmography ==
- Dune (2021; co-won with Paul Lambert, Tristan Myles and Gerd Nefzer)
