= Paul Lambert (special effects artist) =

Canadian visual effects supervisor

Paul Lambert is an English visual effects supervisor at Wylie Co. He has won four Academy Awards for Best Visual Effects, for Blade Runner 2049 (2017), First Man (2018), Dune (2021), and Dune: Part Two (2024). With his most recent victory, Lambert tied the record of a "perfect score" of four Oscar nominations and four wins that had been held by sound editor Mark Berger (and was since matched that same ceremony by filmmaker Sean Baker).

== Selected filmography ==
- Lara Croft: Tomb Raider – The Cradle of Life (2003)
- The Day After Tomorrow (2004)
- Stealth (2005)
- Letters from Iwo Jima (2006)
- Flags of Our Fathers (2006)
- Pirates of the Caribbean: At World's End (2007)
- The Curious Case of Benjamin Button (2008)
- G.I. Joe: The Rise of Cobra (2009)
- Tron: Legacy (2010)
- The Girl with the Dragon Tattoo (2011)
- Oblivion (2013)
- Jack the Giant Slayer (2013)
- Gone Girl (2014)
- The Huntsman: Winter's War (2015)
- Blade Runner 2049 (2017)
- First Man (2018)
- Dune (2021)
- Dune: Part Two (2024)
- Project Hail Mary (2026)

== Accolades ==
| Award | Date of ceremony | Category | Film | Result | Ref |
|---|---|---|---|---|---|
| Academy Awards | 4 March 2018 | Best Visual Effects | Blade Runner 2049 | Won | |
| Academy Awards | 24 February 2019 | Best Visual Effects | First Man | Won | |
| Academy Awards | 27 March 2022 | Best Visual Effects | Dune | Won | |
| Academy Awards | 2 March 2025 | Best Visual Effects | Dune: Part Two | Won | |
| British Academy Film Awards | 18 February 2018 | Best Special Visual Effects | Blade Runner 2049 | Won | |
| British Academy Film Awards | 10 February 2019 | Best Special Visual Effects | First Man | Nominated | |
| British Academy Film Awards | 13 March 2022 | Best Special Visual Effects | Dune | Won | |
| British Academy Film Awards | 16 February 2025 | Best Special Visual Effects | Dune: Part Two | Won | |
