= List of accolades received by Little Women (2019 film) =

Accolades received by American film

Little Women accolades
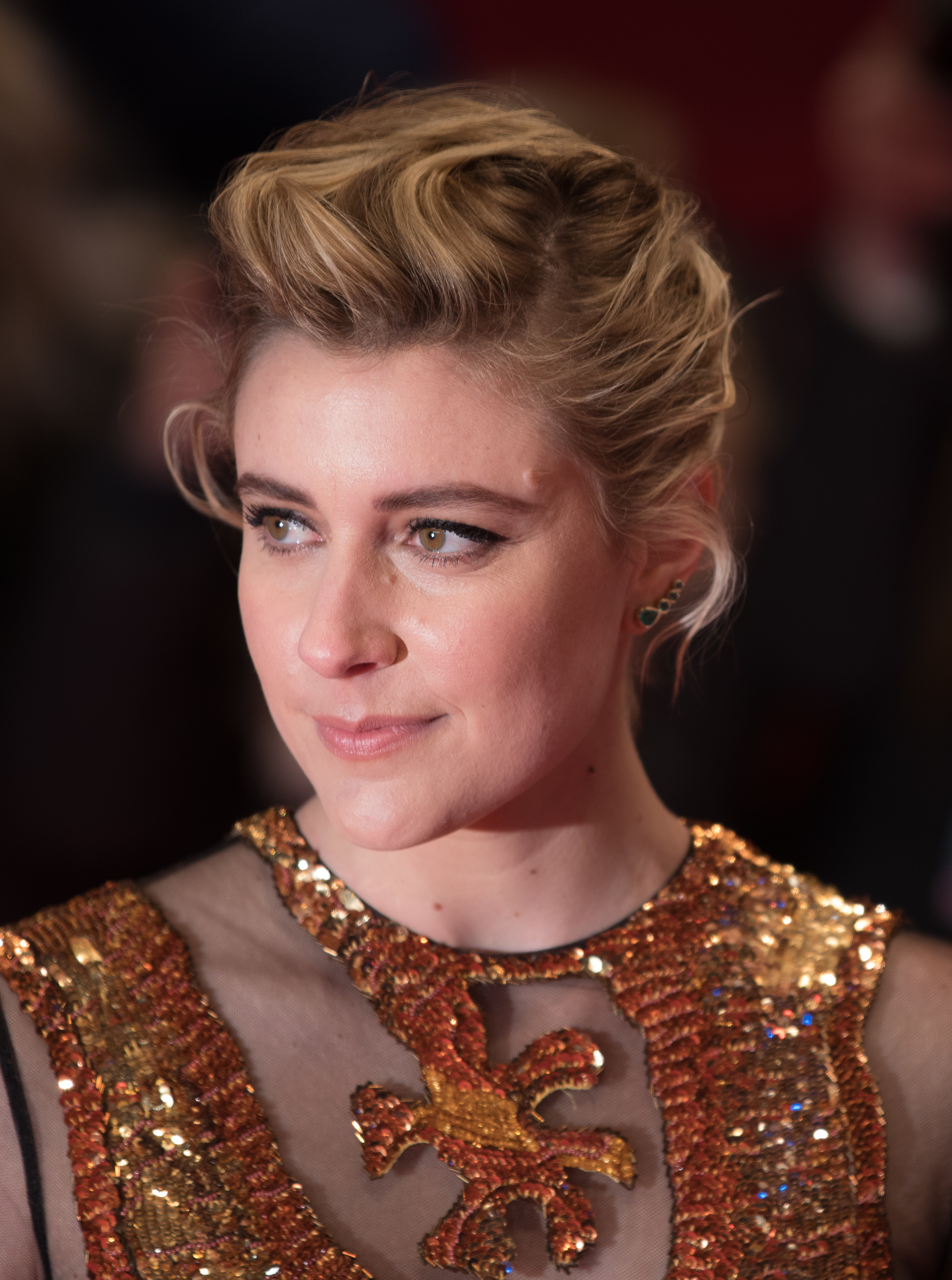
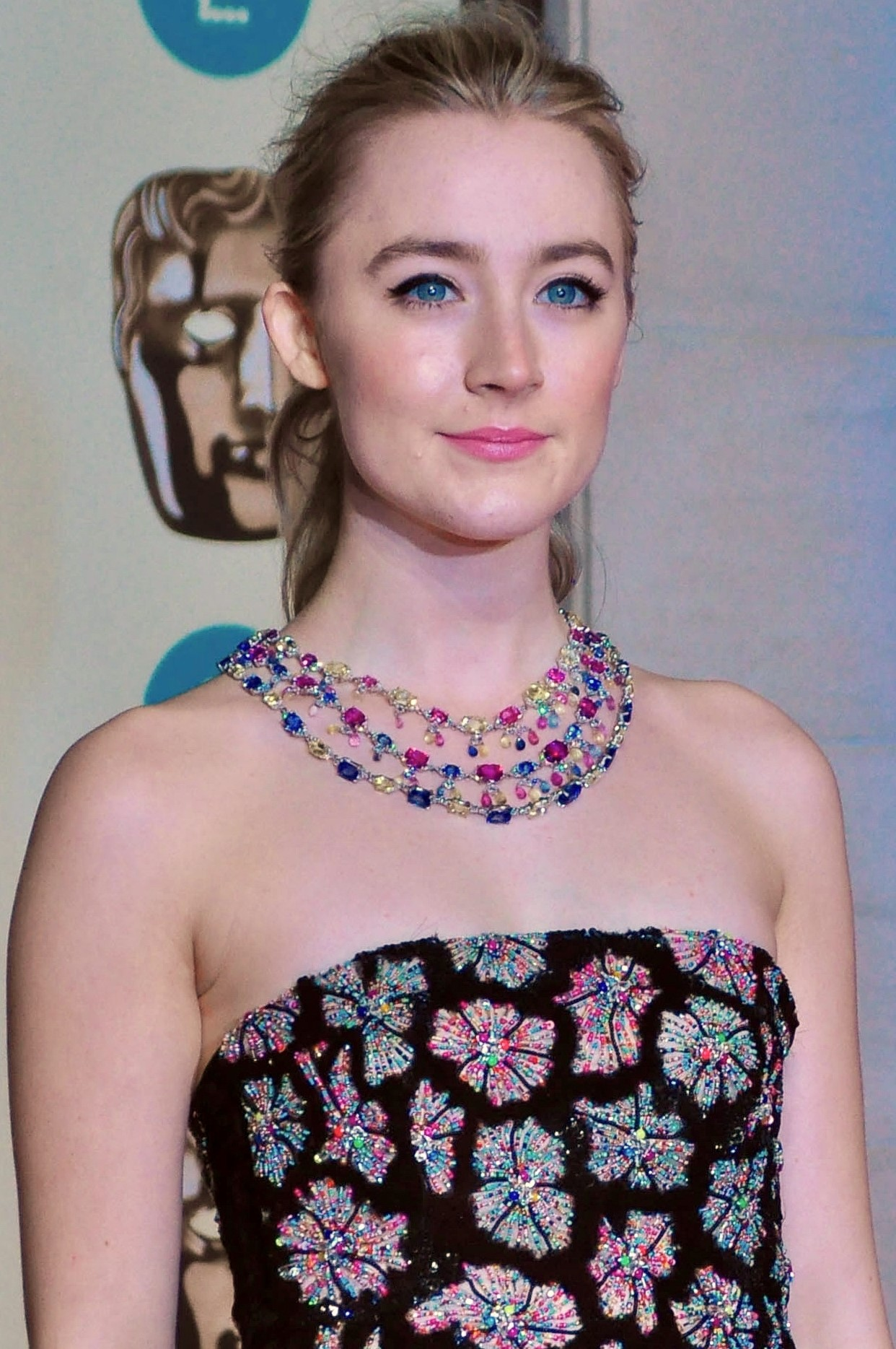
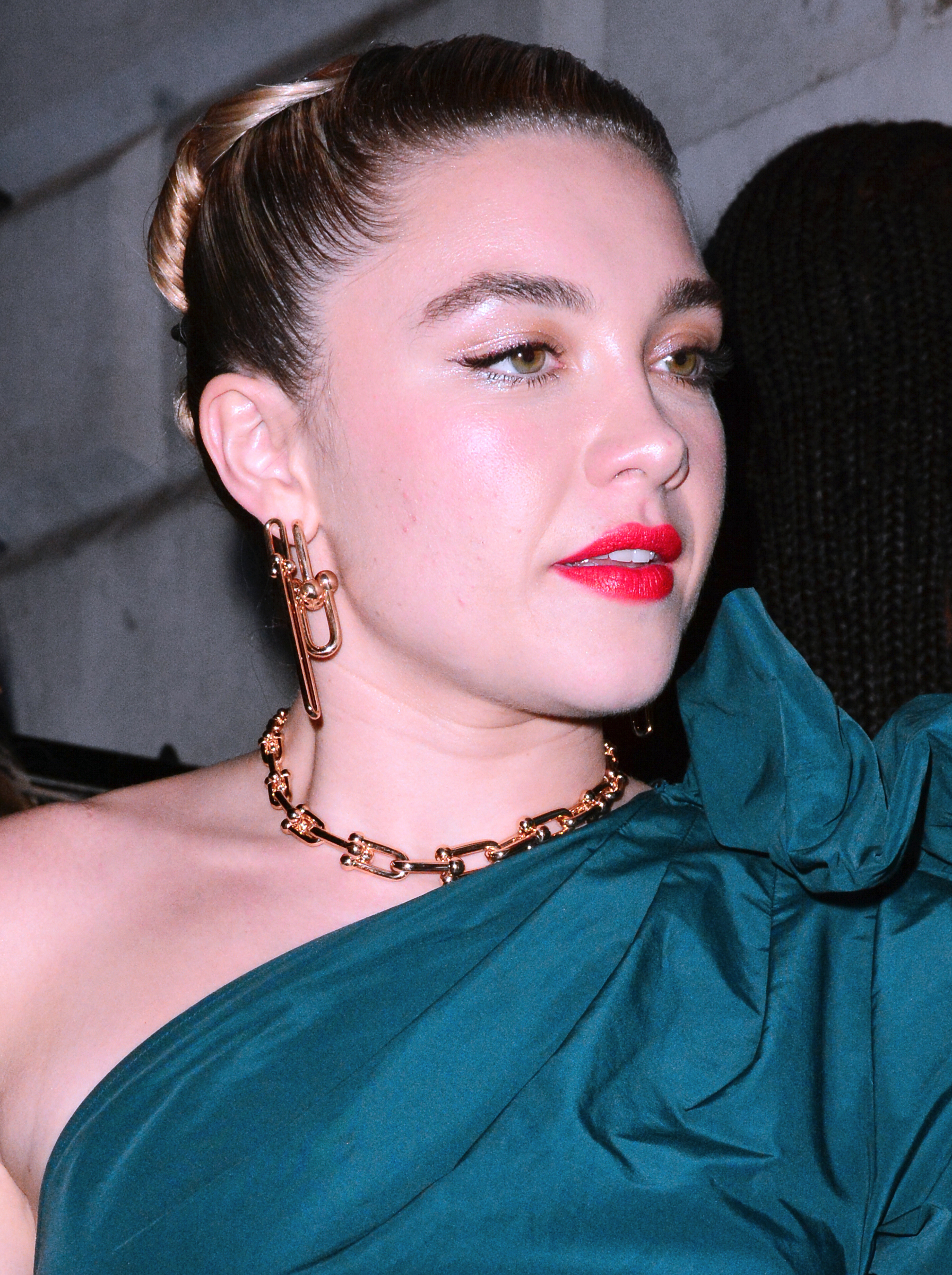
- Greta Gerwig (left) received several accolades for her screenplay and direction, as did Saoirse Ronan (middle) and Florence Pugh (right) for their performances.
Accolades
Award	Wins	Nominations
AACTA International Awards	1	2
AARP Movies for Grownups Awards	0	5
Academy Awards	1	6
Alliance of Women Film Journalists Awards	5	7
American Film Institute Awards	1	1
Artios Awards	0	1
Austin Film Critics Association Awards	2	6
Belgian Film Critics Association Awards	0	1
Bodil Awards	0	1
Boston Society of Film Critics Awards	7	7
British Academy Film Awards	1	5
Chicago Film Critics Association Awards	4	8
Cinema for Peace Awards	0	2
Critics' Choice Movie Awards	1	9
Dallas–Fort Worth Film Critics Association Awards	4	4
Detroit Film Critics Society Awards	1	2
Dorian Awards	1	5
Dublin Film Critics' Circle Awards	1	1
Florida Film Critics Circle Awards	3	4
Georgia Film Critics Association Awards	3	8
Golden Globe Awards	0	2
Golden Reel Awards	0	1
Heartland International Film Festival Awards	1	1
Hollywood Critics Association Awards	0	3
Hollywood Music in Media Awards	0	1
Houston Film Critics Society Awards	0	3
IndieWire Critics Poll	7	7
International Cinephile Society Awards	2	3
International Film Music Critics Association Awards	1	2
IFTA Film & Drama Awards	0	1
Kansas City Film Critics Circle Awards	1	1
Location Managers Guild Awards	0	1
London Film Critics' Circle Awards	1	4
Movieguide Awards	0	1
National Society of Film Critics Awards	6	6
New York Film Critics Circle Awards	1	1
Online Film Critics Society Awards	0	3
Producers Guild of America Awards	0	1
The ReFrame Stamp	1	1
San Diego Film Critics Society Awards	2	6
Sant Jordi Awards	0	1
Santa Barbara International Film Festival Awards	1	1
San Francisco Bay Area Film Critics Circle Awards	0	2
Seattle Film Critics Society Awards	0	7
St. Louis Film Critics Association Awards	2	5
Toronto Film Critics Association Awards	1	1
Turkish Film Critics Association Awards	1	1
USC Scripter Awards	1	1
Vancouver Film Critics Circle Awards	0	2
Washington D.C. Area Film Critics Association Awards	1	7
Women Film Critics Circle Awards	3	6
World Soundtrack Awards	0	1
Writers Guild of America Awards	0	1

Totals (Note: Certain award groups do not simply award one winner. They acknowledge several different recipients, have runners-up, and have third place. Since this is a specific recognition and is different from losing an award, runner-up mentions are considered wins in this award tally. For simplification and to avoid errors, each award in this list has been presumed to have had a prior nomination.)
- Wins: 69
- Nominations: 170

Little Women is a 2019 American coming-of-age film written and directed by Greta Gerwig. It is the seventh film adaptation of the 1868 novel by Louisa May Alcott. The film chronicles the lives of the March sisters—Jo, Meg, Amy, and Beth—in Concord, Massachusetts, during the American Civil War. Little Women stars an ensemble cast consisting of Saoirse Ronan, Florence Pugh, Emma Watson, Eliza Scanlen, Laura Dern, Timothée Chalamet, Meryl Streep, Tracy Letts, Bob Odenkirk, James Norton, Louis Garrel, and Chris Cooper.

The film premiered at the Museum of Modern Art in New York City on December 7, 2019, and was theatrically released in the United States on December 25, 2019, by Sony Pictures Releasing. Produced on a budget of $40 million, Little Women grossed $220 million worldwide, with a net profit of $56 million. It was met with critical acclaim, (Note: Attributed to multiple references:) with particular praise for its performances, (Note: Attributed to multiple references:) as well as Gerwig's screenplay and direction. (Note: Attributed to multiple references:) On the review aggregator website Rotten Tomatoes, Little Women holds an approval rating of 95% based on 441 critics' reviews. Time named it one of the ten best films of the 2010s.

At the 92nd Academy Awards, Little Women won Best Costume Design (Jacqueline Durran) and received nominations for Best Picture (Amy Pascal), Best Actress (Ronan), Best Supporting Actress (Pugh), Best Adapted Screenplay (Gerwig), and Best Original Score (Alexandre Desplat). It also garnered five nominations at the 73rd British Academy Film Awards, winning Best Costume Design (Durran), and two nominations at the 77th Golden Globe Awards. The film received nine nominations at the 25th Critics' Choice Awards, winning Best Adapted Screenplay (Gerwig). The American Film Institute selected Little Women as one of the top-ten films of 2019.

== Accolades ==
Accolades received by Little Women (2019 film)
Award	Date of ceremony	Category	Recipient(s)	Result	Ref.
AACTA International Awards	January 3, 2020	Best Lead Actress	Saoirse Ronan	Won	
AACTA International Awards	January 3, 2020	Best Supporting Actress	Florence Pugh	Nominated	
AARP Movies for Grownups Awards	January 19, 2020	Best Picture/Best Movie for Grownups	Little Women	Nominated	
AARP Movies for Grownups Awards	January 19, 2020	Best Ensemble	Little Women	Nominated	
AARP Movies for Grownups Awards	January 19, 2020	Best Intergenerational Film	Little Women	Nominated	
AARP Movies for Grownups Awards	January 19, 2020	Best Time Capsule	Little Women	Nominated	
AARP Movies for Grownups Awards	January 19, 2020	Readers' Choice	Little Women	Nominated	
Academy Awards	February 9, 2020	Best Picture	Amy Pascal	Nominated	
Academy Awards	February 9, 2020	Best Actress	Saoirse Ronan	Nominated	
Academy Awards	February 9, 2020	Best Supporting Actress	Florence Pugh	Nominated	
Academy Awards	February 9, 2020	Best Adapted Screenplay	Greta Gerwig	Nominated	
Academy Awards	February 9, 2020	Best Costume Design	Jacqueline Durran	Won	
Academy Awards	February 9, 2020	Best Original Score	Alexandre Desplat	Nominated	
Alliance of Women Film Journalists Awards	January 10, 2020	Best Actress	Saoirse Ronan	Nominated	
Alliance of Women Film Journalists Awards	January 10, 2020	Best Supporting Actress	Florence Pugh	Won	
Alliance of Women Film Journalists Awards	January 10, 2020	Best Adapted Screenplay	Greta Gerwig	Won	
Alliance of Women Film Journalists Awards	January 10, 2020	Best Ensemble	Kathy Driscoll and Francine Maisler	Won	
Alliance of Women Film Journalists Awards	January 10, 2020	Best Woman Director	Greta Gerwig	Nominated	
Alliance of Women Film Journalists Awards	January 10, 2020	Best Woman Screenwriter	Greta Gerwig	Won	
Alliance of Women Film Journalists Awards	January 10, 2020	Best Woman's Breakthrough Performance	Florence Pugh	Won (Note: Also for Fighting with My Family and Midsommar)	
American Film Institute Awards	January 3, 2020	Top 10 Films of the Year	Little Women	Won	
Artios Awards	January 30, 2020	Outstanding Achievement in Casting – Big Budget Feature (Drama)	Francine Maisler, Kathy Driscoll-Mohler, Douglas Aibel, and Carolyn Pickman	Nominated	
Austin Film Critics Association Awards	January 7, 2020	Best Director	Greta Gerwig	Nominated	
Austin Film Critics Association Awards	January 7, 2020	Best Adapted Screenplay	Greta Gerwig	Won	
Austin Film Critics Association Awards	January 7, 2020	Best Supporting Actress	Florence Pugh	Nominated	
Austin Film Critics Association Awards	January 7, 2020	Best Ensemble	Little Women	Nominated	
Austin Film Critics Association Awards	January 7, 2020	Breakthrough Artist	Florence Pugh	Won	
Austin Film Critics Association Awards	January 7, 2020	Best Original Score	Alexandre Desplat	Nominated	
Belgian Film Critics Association Awards	December 28, 2020	Grand Prix	Little Women	Nominated	
Bodil Awards	May 10, 2021	Best English Language Film	Little Women	Nominated	
Boston Society of Film Critics Awards	December 15, 2019	Best Picture	Little Women	Won	
Boston Society of Film Critics Awards	December 15, 2019	Best Actress	Saoirse Ronan	Won	
Boston Society of Film Critics Awards	December 15, 2019	Best Supporting Actress	Florence Pugh	Runner-up	
Boston Society of Film Critics Awards	December 15, 2019	Best Director	Greta Gerwig	Runner-up	
Boston Society of Film Critics Awards	December 15, 2019	Best Screenplay	Greta Gerwig	Runner-up (Note: Tied with Noah Baumbach for Marriage Story)	
Boston Society of Film Critics Awards	December 15, 2019	Best Ensemble	Little Women	Won	
Boston Society of Film Critics Awards	December 15, 2019	Best Original Score	Alexandre Desplat	Won	
British Academy Film Awards	February 2, 2020	Best Actress in a Leading Role	Saoirse Ronan	Nominated	
British Academy Film Awards	February 2, 2020	Best Actress in a Supporting Role	Florence Pugh	Nominated	
British Academy Film Awards	February 2, 2020	Best Adapted Screenplay	Greta Gerwig	Nominated	
British Academy Film Awards	February 2, 2020	Best Costume Design	Jacqueline Durran	Won	
British Academy Film Awards	February 2, 2020	Best Original Score	Alexandre Desplat	Nominated	
Chicago Film Critics Association Awards	December 14, 2019	Best Film	Little Women	Nominated	
Chicago Film Critics Association Awards	December 14, 2019	Best Director	Greta Gerwig	Nominated	
Chicago Film Critics Association Awards	December 14, 2019	Best Supporting Actress	Florence Pugh	Won	
Chicago Film Critics Association Awards	December 14, 2019	Best Adapted Screenplay	Greta Gerwig	Won	
Chicago Film Critics Association Awards	December 14, 2019	Best Costume Design	Jacqueline Durran	Won	
Chicago Film Critics Association Awards	December 14, 2019	Best Original Score	Alexandre Desplat	Won	
Chicago Film Critics Association Awards	December 14, 2019	Best Editing	Nick Houy	Nominated	
Chicago Film Critics Association Awards	December 14, 2019	Best Art Direction	Jess Gonchor and Claire Kaufman	Nominated	
Cinema for Peace Awards	February 23, 2020	Women's Empowerment Award	Little Women	Nominated	
Cinema for Peace Awards	February 23, 2020	Most Valuable Film of the Year	Little Women	Nominated	
Critics' Choice Movie Awards	January 12, 2020	Best Picture	Little Women	Nominated	
Critics' Choice Movie Awards	January 12, 2020	Best Director	Greta Gerwig	Nominated	
Critics' Choice Movie Awards	January 12, 2020	Best Actress	Saoirse Ronan	Nominated	
Critics' Choice Movie Awards	January 12, 2020	Best Supporting Actress	Florence Pugh	Nominated	
Critics' Choice Movie Awards	January 12, 2020	Best Acting Ensemble	Little Women	Nominated	
Critics' Choice Movie Awards	January 12, 2020	Best Adapted Screenplay	Greta Gerwig	Won	
Critics' Choice Movie Awards	January 12, 2020	Best Costume Design	Jacqueline Durran	Nominated	
Critics' Choice Movie Awards	January 12, 2020	Best Original Score	Alexandre Desplat	Nominated	
Critics' Choice Movie Awards	January 12, 2020	Best Production Design	Jess Gonchor and Claire Kaufman	Nominated	
Dallas–Fort Worth Film Critics Association Awards	December 16, 2019	Top 10 Films of the Year	Little Women	7th Place	
Dallas–Fort Worth Film Critics Association Awards	December 16, 2019	Best Actress	Saoirse Ronan	4th Place	
Dallas–Fort Worth Film Critics Association Awards	December 16, 2019	Best Supporting Actress	Florence Pugh	3rd Place	
Dallas–Fort Worth Film Critics Association Awards	December 16, 2019	Best Musical Score	Alexandre Desplat	Runner-up	
Detroit Film Critics Society Awards	December 9, 2019	Best Supporting Actress	Florence Pugh	Nominated	
Detroit Film Critics Society Awards	December 9, 2019	Best Breakthrough Performance	Florence Pugh	Won	
Dorian Awards	January 8, 2020	Film of the Year	Little Women	Nominated	
Dorian Awards	January 8, 2020	Director of the Year	Greta Gerwig	Nominated	
Dorian Awards	January 8, 2020	Screenplay of the Year	Greta Gerwig	Nominated	
Dorian Awards	January 8, 2020	Supporting Film Performance of the Year – Actress	Florence Pugh	Nominated	
Dorian Awards	January 8, 2020	Rising Star of the Year	Florence Pugh	Won	
Dublin Film Critics' Circle Awards	December 17, 2019	Best Actress	Saoirse Ronan	7th Place	
Florida Film Critics Circle Awards	December 23, 2019	Best Director	Greta Gerwig	Nominated	
Florida Film Critics Circle Awards	December 23, 2019	Best Adapted Screenplay	Greta Gerwig	Won	
Florida Film Critics Circle Awards	December 23, 2019	Best Ensemble	Little Women	Won	
Florida Film Critics Circle Awards	December 23, 2019	Breakout Award	Florence Pugh	Won	
Georgia Film Critics Association Awards	January 10, 2020	Best Picture	Little Women	Nominated	
Georgia Film Critics Association Awards	January 10, 2020	Best Actress	Saoirse Ronan	Nominated	
Georgia Film Critics Association Awards	January 10, 2020	Best Supporting Actress	Florence Pugh	Won	
Georgia Film Critics Association Awards	January 10, 2020	Best Adapted Screenplay	Greta Gerwig	Nominated	
Georgia Film Critics Association Awards	January 10, 2020	Best Production Design	Jess Gonchor, Sean Falkner, Chris Farmer, and Bryan Felty	Nominated	
Georgia Film Critics Association Awards	January 10, 2020	Best Original Score	Alexandre Desplat	Nominated	
Georgia Film Critics Association Awards	January 10, 2020	Best Ensemble	Little Women	Won	
Georgia Film Critics Association Awards	January 10, 2020	Breakthrough Artist	Florence Pugh	Won	
Golden Globe Awards	January 5, 2020	Best Actress in a Motion Picture – Drama	Saoirse Ronan	Nominated	
Golden Globe Awards	January 5, 2020	Best Original Score	Alexandre Desplat	Nominated	
Golden Reel Awards	January 19, 2020	Outstanding Achievement in Sound Editing – Music Underscore	Suzana Peric and Xavier Forcioli	Nominated	
Heartland International Film Festival Awards	October 20, 2019	Truly Moving Picture Award	Little Women	Won	
Hollywood Critics Association Awards	January 9, 2020	Best Female Director	Greta Gerwig	Nominated	
Hollywood Critics Association Awards	January 9, 2020	Best Costume Design	Jacqueline Durran	Nominated	
Hollywood Critics Association Awards	January 9, 2020	Best Score	Alexandre Desplat	Nominated	
Hollywood Music in Media Awards	November 20, 2019	Best Original Score in a Feature Film	Alexandre Desplat	Nominated	
Houston Film Critics Society Awards	January 2, 2020	Best Actress	Saoirse Ronan	Nominated	
Houston Film Critics Society Awards	January 2, 2020	Best Supporting Actress	Florence Pugh	Nominated	
Houston Film Critics Society Awards	January 2, 2020	Best Original Score	Alexandre Desplat	Nominated	
IndieWire Critics Poll	December 16, 2019	Best Film	Little Women	10th Place	
IndieWire Critics Poll	December 16, 2019	Best Director	Greta Gerwig	8th Place	
IndieWire Critics Poll	December 16, 2019	Best Actress	Saoirse Ronan	9th Place	
IndieWire Critics Poll	December 16, 2019	Best Supporting Actress	Florence Pugh	3rd Place	
IndieWire Critics Poll	December 16, 2019	Best Supporting Actor	Timothée Chalamet	15th Place	
IndieWire Critics Poll	December 16, 2019	Best Screenplay	Greta Gerwig	6th Place	
IndieWire Critics Poll	December 16, 2019	Best Cinematography	Yorick Le Saux	14th Place	
International Cinephile Society Awards	February 4, 2020	Best Picture	Little Women	11th Place	
International Cinephile Society Awards	February 4, 2020	Best Adapted Screenplay	Greta Gerwig	Runner-up	
International Cinephile Society Awards	February 4, 2020	Best Ensemble	Little Women	Nominated	
International Film Music Critics Association Awards	February 20, 2020	Film Score of the Year	Alexandre Desplat	Nominated	
International Film Music Critics Association Awards	February 20, 2020	Best Original Score for a Drama film	Alexandre Desplat	Won	
IFTA Film & Drama Awards	October 18, 2020	Best Actress in a Leading Role – Film	Saoirse Ronan	Nominated	
Kansas City Film Critics Circle Awards	December 15, 2019	Best Adapted Screenplay	Greta Gerwig	Won	
Location Managers Guild Awards	October 24, 2020	Outstanding Locations in a Period Film	Douglas Dresser and Kyle "Snappy" Oliver	Nominated	
London Film Critics' Circle Awards	January 30, 2020	Supporting Actress of the Year	Florence Pugh	Nominated	
London Film Critics' Circle Awards	January 30, 2020	British/Irish Actress of the Year	Florence Pugh	Won	
London Film Critics' Circle Awards	January 30, 2020	British/Irish Actress of the Year	Saoirse Ronan	Nominated	
London Film Critics' Circle Awards	January 30, 2020	Technical Achievement Award	Jacqueline Durran	Nominated	
Movieguide Awards	January 24, 2020	Best Movie for Mature Audiences	Little Women	Nominated	
National Society of Film Critics Awards	January 4, 2020	Best Picture	Little Women	Runner-up	
National Society of Film Critics Awards	January 4, 2020	Best Director	Greta Gerwig	Won	
National Society of Film Critics Awards	January 4, 2020	Best Supporting Actress	Laura Dern	Won (Note: Also for Marriage Story)	
National Society of Film Critics Awards	January 4, 2020	Best Supporting Actress	Florence Pugh	Runner-up	
National Society of Film Critics Awards	January 4, 2020	Best Screenplay	Greta Gerwig	3rd Place	
National Society of Film Critics Awards	January 4, 2020	Best Cinematography	Yorick Le Saux	3rd Place	
New York Film Critics Circle Awards	January 7, 2020	Best Supporting Actress	Laura Dern	Won	
Online Film Critics Society Awards	January 6, 2020	Best Supporting Actress	Florence Pugh	Nominated	
Online Film Critics Society Awards	January 6, 2020	Best Adapted Screenplay	Greta Gerwig	Nominated	
Online Film Critics Society Awards	January 6, 2020	Best Original Score	Alexandre Desplat	Nominated	
Producers Guild of America Awards	January 18, 2020	Best Theatrical Motion Picture	Amy Pascal	Nominated	
The ReFrame Stamp	February 26, 2020	Top 100-Grossing Narrative Feature	Little Women	Won	
San Diego Film Critics Society Awards	December 9, 2019	Best Actress	Saoirse Ronan	Nominated	
San Diego Film Critics Society Awards	December 9, 2019	Best Supporting Actress	Florence Pugh	Nominated	
San Diego Film Critics Society Awards	December 9, 2019	Best Adapted Screenplay	Greta Gerwig	Nominated	
San Diego Film Critics Society Awards	December 9, 2019	Best Costume Design	Jacqueline Durran	Nominated	
San Diego Film Critics Society Awards	December 9, 2019	Best Production Design	Jess Gonchor	Runner-up	
San Diego Film Critics Society Awards	December 9, 2019	Breakthrough Artist	Florence Pugh	Won (Note: Also for Midsommar)	
Sant Jordi Awards	January 21, 2020	Best Actress in a Foreign Film	Saoirse Ronan	Nominated	
Santa Barbara International Film Festival Awards	January 18, 2020	Virtuosos Award	Florence Pugh	Won	
San Francisco Bay Area Film Critics Circle Awards	December 16, 2019	Best Adapted Screenplay	Greta Gerwig	Nominated	
San Francisco Bay Area Film Critics Circle Awards	December 16, 2019	Best Original Score	Alexandre Desplat	Nominated	
Seattle Film Critics Society Awards	December 16, 2019	Best Picture	Little Women	Nominated	
Seattle Film Critics Society Awards	December 16, 2019	Best Director	Greta Gerwig	Nominated	
Seattle Film Critics Society Awards	December 16, 2019	Best Actress	Saoirse Ronan	Nominated	
Seattle Film Critics Society Awards	December 16, 2019	Best Supporting Actress	Florence Pugh	Nominated	
Seattle Film Critics Society Awards	December 16, 2019	Best Ensemble	Little Women	Nominated	
Seattle Film Critics Society Awards	December 16, 2019	Best Costume Design	Jacqueline Durran	Nominated	
Seattle Film Critics Society Awards	December 16, 2019	Best Production Design	Jess Gonchor and Claire Kaufman	Nominated	
St. Louis Film Critics Association Awards	December 15, 2019	Best Film	Little Women	Nominated	
St. Louis Film Critics Association Awards	December 15, 2019	Best Actress	Saoirse Ronan	Nominated	
St. Louis Film Critics Association Awards	December 15, 2019	Best Supporting Actress	Florence Pugh	Nominated	
St. Louis Film Critics Association Awards	December 15, 2019	Best Adapted Screenplay	Greta Gerwig	Runner-up (Note: Tied with Taika Waititi for Jojo Rabbit)	
St. Louis Film Critics Association Awards	December 15, 2019	Best Production Design	Jess Gonchor	Runner-up (Note: Tied with Dennis Gassner for 1917)	
Toronto Film Critics Association Awards	December 8, 2019	Best Supporting Actress	Florence Pugh	Runner-up (Note: Tied with Julia Fox for Uncut Gems)	
Turkish Film Critics Association Awards	January 18, 2021	Best Foreign Film	Little Women	13th Place	
USC Scripter Awards	January 25, 2020	Best Adaptation	Greta Gerwig	Won	
Vancouver Film Critics Circle Awards	December 16, 2019	Best Actress	Saoirse Ronan	Nominated	
Vancouver Film Critics Circle Awards	December 16, 2019	Best Supporting Actress	Florence Pugh	Nominated	
Washington D.C. Area Film Critics Association Awards	December 8, 2019	Best Director	Greta Gerwig	Nominated	
Washington D.C. Area Film Critics Association Awards	December 8, 2019	Best Actress	Saoirse Ronan	Nominated	
Washington D.C. Area Film Critics Association Awards	December 8, 2019	Best Supporting Actress	Florence Pugh	Nominated	
Washington D.C. Area Film Critics Association Awards	December 8, 2019	Best Ensemble	Little Women	Nominated	
Washington D.C. Area Film Critics Association Awards	December 8, 2019	Best Adapted Screenplay	Greta Gerwig	Won	
Washington D.C. Area Film Critics Association Awards	December 8, 2019	Best Production Design	Jess Gonchor and Claire Kaufman	Nominated	
Washington D.C. Area Film Critics Association Awards	December 8, 2019	Best Original Score	Alexandre Desplat	Nominated	
Women Film Critics Circle Awards	December 7, 2019	Best Movie About Women	Little Women	Runner-up	
Women Film Critics Circle Awards	December 7, 2019	Best Movie by a Woman	Little Women	Nominated	
Women Film Critics Circle Awards	December 7, 2019	Best Woman Storyteller	Greta Gerwig	Won	
Women Film Critics Circle Awards	December 7, 2019	Best Equality of the Sexes	Little Women	Nominated	
Women Film Critics Circle Awards	December 7, 2019	Best Screen Couple	Florence Pugh and Louis Garrel	Nominated	
Women Film Critics Circle Awards	December 7, 2019	Karen Morley Award	Little Women	Runner-up	
World Soundtrack Awards	October 24, 2020	Film Composer of the Year	Alexandre Desplat	Nominated (Note: Also for An Officer and a Spy and Adults in the Room)	
Writers Guild of America Awards	February 1, 2020	Best Adapted Screenplay	Greta Gerwig	Nominated	
