= Little Women (2019 film) =

2019 American film by Greta Gerwig

- Theatrical release poster
- Directed by: Greta Gerwig
- Screenplay by: Greta Gerwig
- Based on: Little Women; 1868 novel by Louisa May Alcott
- Produced by: Amy Pascal; Denise Di Novi; Robin Swicord
- Starring: Saoirse Ronan; Emma Watson; Florence Pugh; Eliza Scanlen; Laura Dern; Timothée Chalamet; Tracy Letts; Bob Odenkirk; James Norton; Louis Garrel; Chris Cooper; Meryl Streep
- Cinematography: Yorick Le Saux
- Edited by: Nick Houy
- Music by: Alexandre Desplat
- Production companies: Columbia Pictures; Regency Enterprises; Pascal Pictures
- Distributed by: Sony Pictures Releasing
- Release dates: December 7, 2019 (MoMA); December 25, 2019 (United States)
- Running time: 135 minutes
- Country: United States
- Language: English
- Budget: $40 million
- Box office: $220.1 million

Little Women is a 2019 American period drama film written and directed by Greta Gerwig. It is the seventh film adaptation of the 1868 novel by Louisa May Alcott. It chronicles the lives of the March sisters—Meg, Jo, Beth, and Amy—in Concord, Massachusetts, during the 19th century. It stars an ensemble cast consisting of Saoirse Ronan, Emma Watson, Florence Pugh, Eliza Scanlen, Laura Dern, Timothée Chalamet, Tracy Letts, Bob Odenkirk, James Norton, Louis Garrel, Chris Cooper, and Meryl Streep.

Sony Pictures initiated the development of the film in 2013, with Amy Pascal coming on board to produce in 2015 and Gerwig hired to write its screenplay the following year. Using Alcott's other writings as inspiration, Gerwig penned the script in 2018. She was made director that same year, with the film being the second she had solely directed. Filming took place from October to December 2018 in the state of Massachusetts, with editing commencing the day after filming wrapped.

Little Women premiered at the Museum of Modern Art in New York City on December 7, 2019, and was released theatrically in the United States on December 25, 2019, by Sony Pictures Releasing through its Columbia Pictures label. The film received critical acclaim, with particular praise for Gerwig's screenplay and direction as well as the performances of the cast, and grossed $218 million worldwide. Among its numerous accolades, the film garnered six Academy Award nominations, including Best Picture, Best Actress (Ronan), Best Supporting Actress (Pugh), Best Adapted Screenplay and Best Original Score, and won for Best Costume Design. It also earned five British Academy Film Award nominations, with a win for Best Costume Design, and two Golden Globe Award nominations.

== Plot ==
In 1868, Jo March works as a teacher in New York City. Mr. Dashwood, an editor, has agreed to publish her short story. Meanwhile, her youngest sister Amy, who is in Paris with their Aunt March, attends a party with the Marches' childhood friend and neighbor, Laurie. Amy becomes angry at Laurie's drunken behavior, prompting him to mock her for spending time with wealthy businessman Fred Vaughn.

Jo is hurt and angry when Friedrich Bhaer, a German professor who lives at her boarding house, gives critical feedback on her writing. Upon learning that her younger sister Beth's illness has worsened, Jo returns home to Concord, Massachusetts.

Seven years earlier, in 1861, Jo met her neighbor Laurie while attending a party with her older sister, Meg. On Christmas morning, the girls' mother, "Marmee," persuades them to give their breakfast to their poor neighbors, Mrs. Hummel and her children. After returning home, the Marches find their table laden with food, given by their neighbor and Laurie's grandfather, Mr. Laurence. Marmee then reads a letter from their father, who is fighting in the American Civil War. Jo regularly reads to her father's sister, Aunt March, hoping she will invite her to Europe.

When Jo, Meg, Laurie, and Laurie's tutor John Brooke attend the theater, a jealous Amy burns Jo's unpublished novel. The next morning, Amy, wanting an angry Jo's forgiveness, chases her and Laurie onto a frozen lake. Amy falls through the ice, but Laurie and Jo save her. Mr. Laurence invites Beth to play his late daughter's piano in his house.

In the present, Meg expresses unhappiness about being poor to John after having bought fabric they cannot afford. Laurie visits Amy to apologize for his behavior, urging her not to marry Fred, but instead to marry him. Though in love with Laurie, Amy refuses, upset at always being second to Jo. Despite this, she turns down Fred's proposal.

In the past, Mr. Laurence gives Beth the piano and discovers she has contracted scarlet fever from the Hummels. To avoid exposure to the illness, Amy is sent to stay with Aunt March, who advises her to provide for her family by marrying well. John urges Meg to turn the fabric into a dress in the present to make her happy, but she reveals she sold it, reassuring him she is happy to be his wife.

Beth recovers in time for Christmas in the past, and their father returns home as well. After worsening in the present, Beth dies. On Meg's wedding day in the past, Jo tries to convince her to run away, but Meg expresses her elation to marry John. Aunt March announces her European trip, taking Amy instead of Jo. After the wedding, Laurie proposes to Jo, who refuses, explaining she does not see herself marrying.

In the present, Marmee reveals that Amy is returning from Europe with an ill Aunt March. Jo wonders whether she was too quick to refuse Laurie, so she writes him a letter. Preparing to leave, Amy tells Laurie she turned down Fred's proposal; they kiss and later marry on the journey home. Jo and Laurie agree to remain friends, after which she discards the letter she wrote him.

Jo begins writing a novel based on her and her sisters' lives and sends the first chapters to an unimpressed Mr. Dashwood. Bhaer surprises Jo by turning up at the March house on his way to California.

In New York, Mr. Dashwood agrees to publish Jo's novel as his daughters demand to know how it ends, but he refuses to accept the protagonist remaining unmarried at the end. To appease him, Jo ends her novel with the protagonist, herself, stopping Bhaer from leaving for California. She successfully negotiates copyright and royalties with Mr. Dashwood.

Following Aunt March's death, Jo inherits her house and opens it as a school, where Meg, Amy, John, and Bhaer all teach. Jo observes the printing of her novel, titled Little Women.

== Cast ==
- Saoirse Ronan as Josephine "Jo" March
- Emma Watson as Margaret "Meg" March
- Florence Pugh as Amy March
- Eliza Scanlen as Elizabeth "Beth" March
- Laura Dern as Marmee March
- Timothée Chalamet as Theodore "Laurie" Laurence
- Meryl Streep as Aunt March
- Tracy Letts as Mr. Dashwood
- Bob Odenkirk as Father March
- James Norton as John Brooke
- Louis Garrel as Friedrich Bhaer
- Chris Cooper as Mr. Laurence
- Jayne Houdyshell as Hannah
- Rafael Silva as Friedrich's friend
- Dash Barber as Fred Vaughn
- Hadley Robinson as Sallie Gardiner Moffat
- Abby Quinn as Annie Moffat
- Maryann Plunkett as Mrs. Kirke
- Edward Fletcher as Mr. Laurence's servant
- Sasha Frolova as Mrs. Hummel

== Production ==
=== Development and casting ===
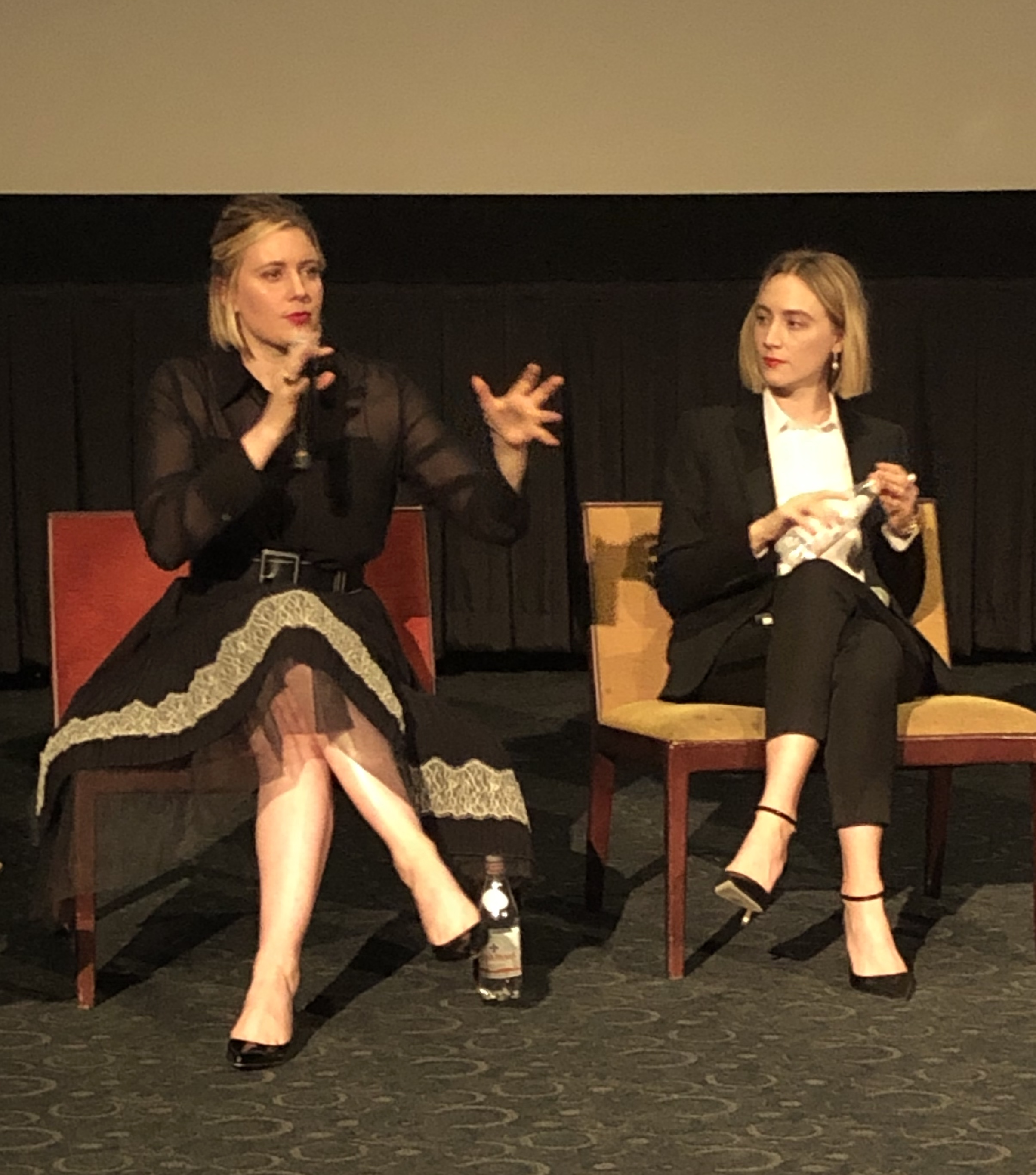
Screenwriter and director Greta Gerwig and star actress Saoirse Ronan at a screening of Little Women.

In October 2013, it was announced that a new film adaptation of the novel Little Women by Louisa May Alcott was in development at Sony Pictures, with Olivia Milch writing the screenplay, and Robin Swicord and Denise Di Novi serving as producers. In March 2015, Amy Pascal joined as a producer on the new adaptation, with Sarah Polley hired to write the script and potentially direct. Ultimately, Polley's involvement never went beyond initial discussions. In August 2016, Greta Gerwig was hired to write the screenplay. In June 2018, Gerwig was announced as the film's director in addition to being its screenwriter. She had heard about Sony's plans to adapt the book in 2015 and urged her agent to get her in touch with the studio, conceding that while she "was not on anybody's list to direct this film", it was something she aspired to do, citing how the book had inspired her to become a writer and director. Pascal described Gerwig's pitch as "the ambition and the dreams that you have as a girl" and how they "get stomped out of you as you grow up" as well as "commerce and art and what we have to do to make things commercial." In addition to being Gerwig's first studio film she had directed, Little Women was her second solo directorial endeavor.

It was also announced in June 2018 that Meryl Streep, Emma Stone, Saoirse Ronan, Timothée Chalamet, and Florence Pugh had joined the cast of the film in undisclosed roles. Gerwig had previously worked with Ronan and Chalamet in her solo directorial debut film, Lady Bird (2017), while she sought to cast Pugh after seeing her in Lady Macbeth (2016). Eliza Scanlen, who Gerwig watched star in the television miniseries Sharp Objects (2018), joined the cast the following month. James Norton and Laura Dern were cast in August. Emma Watson joined the cast that same month, replacing Stone who dropped out due to scheduling conflicts with promoting The Favourite. In September 2018, Louis Garrel, Bob Odenkirk, and Chris Cooper joined the cast in supporting roles. New Regency Pictures was announced as an additional financier on the film in October.

=== Writing ===
Gerwig began penning the screenplay during a trip to Big Sur, California shortly after the 2018 Academy Awards, using Alcott's letters and diaries as well as "19th-century paintings of young women" as inspirations. She had written "three or four drafts" prior to the production of Lady Bird. She also drew inspiration from Alcott's other stories for the dialogues. Gerwig wrote many overlapping lines of dialogue that would be "read on top of one another." In addition, she stated that a monologue in the film was inspired by a conversation she had with Streep about "the challenges women faced in the 1860s". To "focus the film on [its characters] as adults", Gerwig incorporated a nonlinear timeline. The ending differs from that in the novel by depicting "the pleasures of a romance inside a story about Alcott realizing her artistic ambitions", which Gerwig believed honors Alcott's true vision given that Alcott had to "satisfy the era's narrative expectations".

=== Costume design ===
The film required "roughly 75 principal period costumes", each of which took "approximately 40 hours" to create. The costume designer, Jacqueline Durran, combined "a free sartorial spirit" and "the traditional Victorian stiffness" in costuming the characters. Wanting to make "vintage clothes look covetable to the modern viewer", she paired "woollen sontags" with "preppy plaid skirts", "long crimson capes", and "jaunty newsboy caps". She distinguished the characters' childhood and adulthood wardrobes while keeping in mind "the internal logic of each one" and maintaining "the connection between the two", with each character being assigned a "core color", including red for Jo, green and lavender for Meg, brown and pink for Beth, and light blue for Amy. She also had the characters share and reuse the same wardrobe pieces to reinforce their relationships with each other. In addition to styling Jo in "baggy cotton dresses" as well as "plain woolly skirts", Durran incorporated "modern references" and used "a young Bob Dylan", the Teddy Boy subculture, and French artist James Tissot's painting The Circle of the Rue Royale as inspirations to style Laurie. She also modeled one of Jo's looks after a figure in the 1870 painting High Tide by Winslow Homer.

=== Filming and editing ===
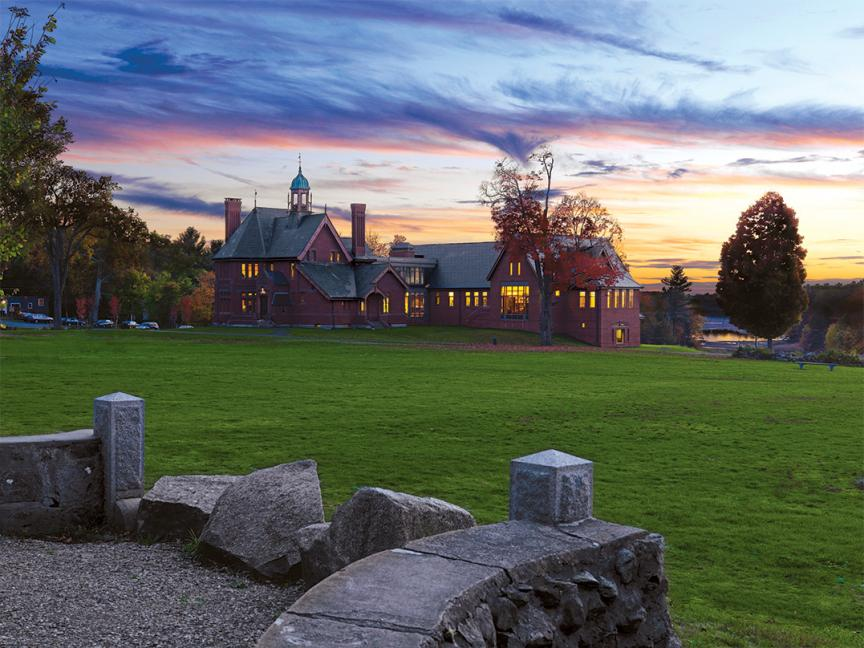
Filming primarily took place in Harvard, Massachusetts.

The cast, except for Pugh due to her filming commitments to Midsommar, began rehearsals for the film two weeks before filming. Principal photography began in Boston in October 2018, with Harvard, Massachusetts, serving as the main location. Additional locations included Lancaster, Harvard University in Cambridge, Crane Beach in Ipswich, and Concord, all in the state of Massachusetts. The Shaker museum in the Fruitlands of Harvard, a property in which Alcott and her family had once resided, was used as the location of Meg and John's home. The March family house was built from scratch on a plot in Concord; production designer Jess Gonchor intended for the exterior to exude "an old worn-out jewelry box that you found in your grandmother's drawer" while likening the interior to "a beautiful maze and flow and endless activity." The Lyman Estate in Waltham was used for a ballroom scene. Harvard University's Arnold Arboretum was used to shoot a scene set in a 19th century Paris park with Pugh, Chalamet, and Streep. Castle Hill in Ipswich was also utilized to double for European scenes.

During production, Gerwig discovered she was pregnant and kept it secret throughout. She imposed a ban on cell phones on set during filming . Also, the main cast lived together in a house for a short period prior to filming to cultivate sibling-like chemistry. Cinematographer Yorick Le Saux shot on 35 mm film. After principal photography wrapped on December 16, 2018, Gerwig began editing the film alongside editor Nick Houy the following day and later screened it for Sony Pictures executives in New York City on March 10, 2019, three days ahead of giving birth to her son.

== Music ==
French composer Alexandre Desplat composed the score. Gerwig had been a fan of Desplat's score for the film Birth and aspired to work with him, while he "loved" Lady Bird. Desplat said in an interview that Gerwig specified that she would like the music to be "a mix of Mozart meeting Bowie", with her later saying that she had enlisted him for the "beautiful but not saccharine" and "exacting" qualities of his music. He employed an orchestra that included a piano, harp, flute, clarinet, and celesta. The score was released on December 13, 2019.

== Release ==
Little Women had its world premiere at the Museum of Modern Art in New York City on December 7, 2019, and was also screened to open the Rio de Janeiro International Film Festival on December 9. It was theatrically released in the United States on December 25, 2019, by Sony Pictures Releasing. Deadline Hollywood reported that Sony spent an estimated $70 million promoting the film.

Little Women was originally scheduled for a theatrical release in China on February 14, 2020, but this was scrapped due to the COVID-19 pandemic. The film was released digitally on March 10, 2020, and on DVD and Blu-ray on April 7. In May, Variety reported that it was once again intended for a China release at an unspecified date following the pandemic. The film was released in Denmark and Japan in June after both countries re-opened their theaters following pandemic lockdowns. It was eventually released in China on August 25, 2020.

In home media packaging and digital artwork, the film is referred to as Greta Gerwig's Little Women to distinguish the film from the various other film and television adaptations of the novel.

== Reception ==
=== Box office ===
Little Women grossed $108.1 million in the United States and Canada, and $110.8 million in other countries, for a worldwide total of $218.9 million, against a production budget of $40 million. In April 2020, Deadline Hollywood calculated its net profit to be $56 million.

Released in the United States and Canada alongside Star Wars: The Rise of Skywalker and Jumanji: The Next Level, the film was projected to gross $18–22 million from 3,308 theaters over its five-day opening weekend. It made $6.4 million on Christmas Day and $6 million on its second day, debuting to $16.8 million (a total of $29.2 million over the five-day Christmas period) and finishing fourth behind the two aforementioned films and Frozen II. In its second weekend, the film grossed $13.6 million, finishing third. It then made $7.8 million and $6.4 million, respectively, the following weekends.

In June 2020, the film grossed $495,000 and $255,000 during its opening weekend in Japan and its second weekend in Denmark, respectively. That same month, it passed $100 million at the international box office following releases in 12 other markets. The film made $4.7 million over the first six days of its August 2020 release in China.

=== Critical response ===
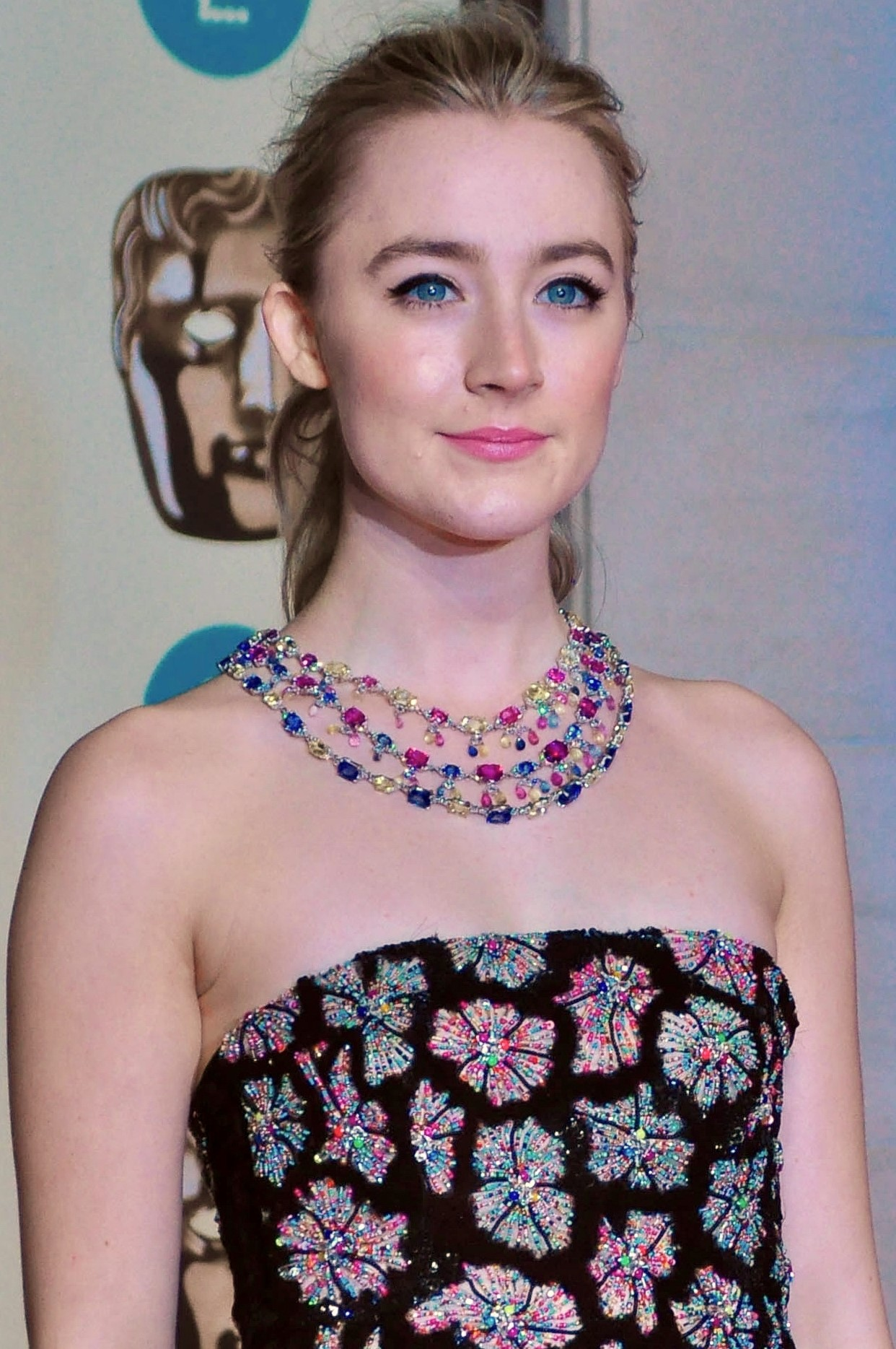
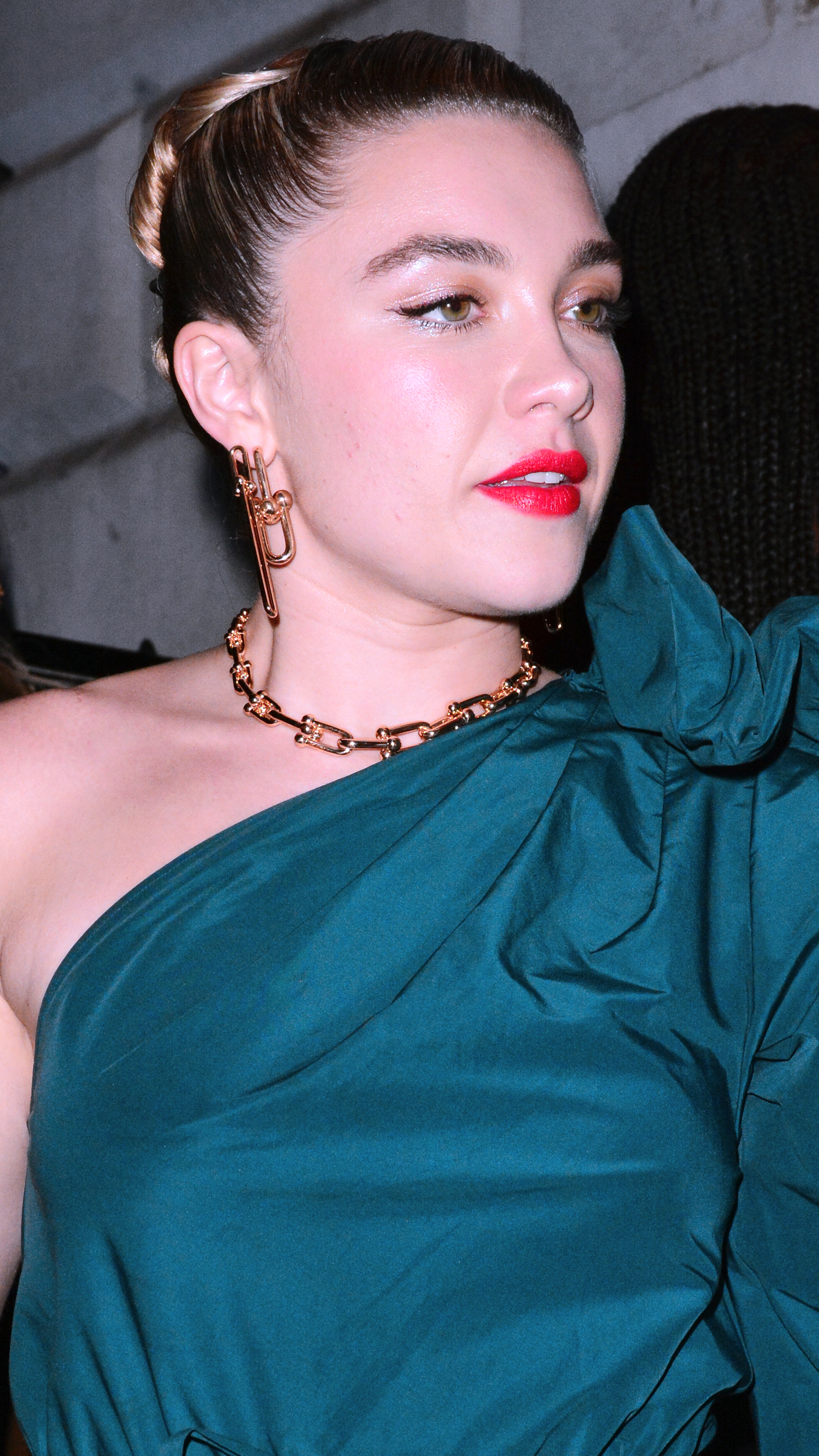
Saoirse Ronan (left) and Florence Pugh were nominated for the Academy Awards for Best Actress and Best Supporting Actress. See also List of accolades received by Little Women (2019 film).

Little Women received critical acclaim. On review aggregator website Rotten Tomatoes, the film has an approval rating of 95% based on 439 reviews, with an average rating of 8.5/10. The website's critics consensus reads: "With a stellar cast and a smart, sensitive retelling of its classic source material, Greta Gerwig's Little Women proves some stories truly are timeless." On Metacritic, it has a weighted average score of 91 out of 100 based on 57 critics, indicating "universal acclaim". Audiences polled by CinemaScore gave the film an average grade of "A−" on an A+ to F scale, and viewers surveyed by PostTrak gave it an average five out of five.

Writing for IndieWire, Kate Erbland highlighted Gerwig's "ambitious elliptical storytelling" and commended her direction for being neither "heavy-handed" nor "preachy". Anthony Lane of The New Yorker said that it "may just be the best film yet made by an American woman". The Associated Press's Lindsey Bahr also praised Gerwig's direction, deeming it an "astonishing accomplishment" and an "artist's statement". Awarding the film three-and-a-half out of four, Brian Truitt of USA Today lauded Gerwig's writing as "magnificent" and said it "makes Alcott's time and language feel effervescently modern and authentically nostalgic". Mick LaSalle, writing for the San Francisco Chronicle, gave the film a mixed review, in which he complimented Gerwig's direction but criticized the nonlinear timeline and the "snooty" characters.

Critics praised the cast's performances, with David Rooney of The Hollywood Reporter highlighting their "lovely ensemble work", and TheWrap's Alonso Duralde saying that there was not "a single artificial moment" from any of the actors. Caryn James of BBC Online called Ronan's performance "luminous", and Entertainment Weekly's Leah Greenblatt suggested that she "carries nearly every scene she's in". David Sims of The Atlantic highlighted Pugh's performance, writing that she turned her character into "a heroine as rich and compelling as [Ronan's]", while The Independent's Clarisse Loughrey stated that Pugh "manages to steal the show". In his review for NPR, Justin Chang hailed both Ronan and Pugh's performances as "blazingly good". Chalamet was also praised by Peter Travers of Rolling Stone and Ann Hornaday of The Washington Post for the "innate charm and poignant vulnerability" as well as "playful physicality" in his performance.

Time featured it on its list of the "100 Best Movies of the Past 10 Decades" as one of the best of the 2010s, writing that the film "is proof that there are always new ways to tell old stories, ensuring that they live far beyond our own preoccupations and tastes, never becoming last season's outmoded gown." In 2025, it ranked number 60 on the "Readers' Choice" edition of The New York Times' list of "The 100 Best Movies of the 21st Century."

While the film overall received six Academy Award nominations, Gerwig was not nominated for Best Director, which was deemed a snub. Allison Pearson of The Telegraph labeled this a "whole new standard of idiocy", opining that it "belittles women's experience", while Slate's Dana Stevens theorized that Academy members believe that "women can only have a little recognition, as a treat" and that Gerwig "may now safely be ignored" since she had been previously nominated for Lady Bird. Writing for the Los Angeles Times, social psychologists Devon Proudfoot and Aaron Kay concluded that the snub was due to a "general psychological tendency to unwittingly view women's work as less creative than men's".

=== Accolades ===
At the 92nd Academy Awards, Little Women received six nominations, including for Best Picture, Best Actress (Ronan), Best Supporting Actress (Pugh), Best Adapted Screenplay and Best Original Score, and won for Best Costume Design. The film also received nine nominations at the 25th Critics' Choice Awards, winning for Best Adapted Screenplay, five nominations at the 73rd British Academy Film Awards, and two at the 77th Golden Globe Awards. It was chosen by the American Film Institute as one of the top ten films of the year. In December 2021, the film's screenplay was listed number eighty-nine on the Writers Guild of America's "101 Greatest Screenplays of the 21st Century (so far)".
