= Amy Pascal =

American film producer and business executive (born 1958)

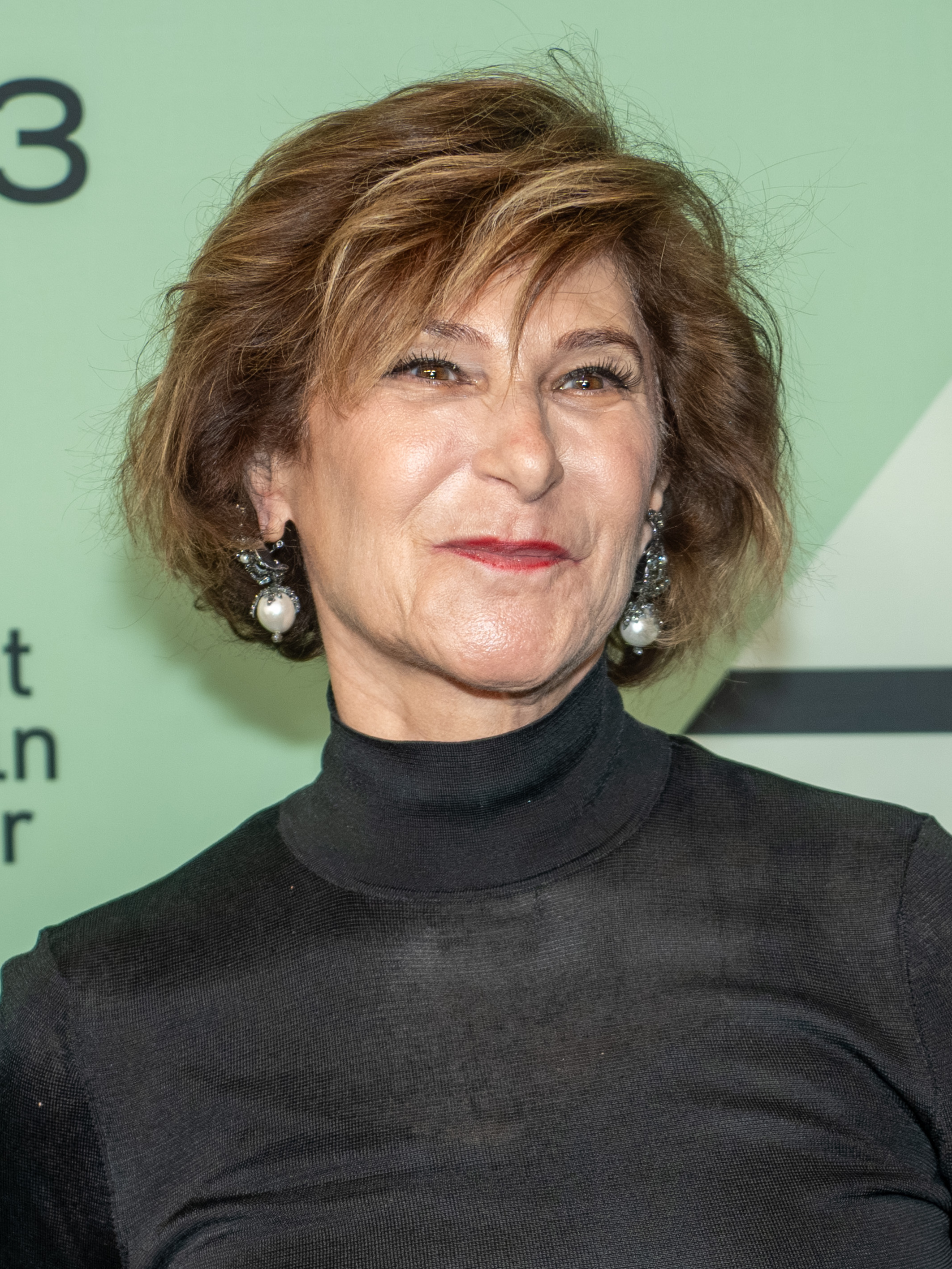
- Pascal in 2025
- Born: March 25, 1958 (age 68); Los Angeles, California, U.S.
- Education: University of California, Los Angeles
- Occupations: Business executive, film producer
- Years active: 1986–present
- Spouse: Bernard Weinraub (m. 1997)
- Children: 1

Amy Pascal (born March 25, 1958) is an American film producer and business executive. She served as the Chairwoman of the Motion Pictures Group of Sony Pictures Entertainment (SPE) and Co-Chairperson of SPE, including Sony Pictures Television, from 2006 until 2015. She has overseen the production and distribution of many films and television programs, and was co-chairperson during the 2014 Sony Pictures hack. The leak uncovered multiple emails from Pascal including racial jokes aimed at then-president Barack Obama. She left Sony and Pascal later admitted that she was fired from the company.

Pascal started her own production company, Pascal Pictures, which made its debut with the 2016 Ghostbusters reboot. In 2017, she produced Spider-Man: Homecoming, Molly's Game and The Post. She has received two Academy Award for Best Picture nominations, for producing The Post and Little Women, and a nomination for the Academy Award for Best Animated Feature for producing Spider-Man: Across the Spider-Verse.

== Early life and education ==
Pascal was born on March 25, 1958, in Los Angeles, California. Her father, Anthony H. Pascal, was an economic researcher at the RAND Corporation who wrote about African American social inequality and the cost of AIDS. Her mother, Barbara Pascal, was a librarian and owner of an art bookstore, Artworks. Her family is Jewish. Pascal attended Crossroads School in Santa Monica, then worked as a bookkeeper at Crossroads School while getting her international relations degree at UCLA.

== Career ==
Pascal started her career as a secretary working for producer Tony Garnett at the independent production company Kestrel Films. From 1986 to 1987, she served as Vice President of Production at 20th Century Fox.

=== Sony Pictures ===
Pascal joined Columbia Pictures in 1988, where she was responsible for the development of films including: Groundhog Day, Little Women, Awakenings, and A League of Their Own. She left Columbia in 1994 and served for two years as the President of Production for Turner Pictures while Scott Sassa was president of Turner Entertainment. During her time at Turner, Pascal hired Damon Lee as a development director.

Pascal rejoined Columbia in 1996 as the studio's president after Turner Pictures merged with Warner Bros. In 1999, Pascal became Chair of Columbia Pictures.

Pascal was named Co-Chairperson of Sony Pictures Entertainment in September 2006. She also served as Chairman of SPE's Motion Picture Group from December 2003 to February 2015. Pascal and SPE's Chairman and CEO Michael Lynton led all of SPE's lines of business, including: motion picture production, acquisition and distribution; television production, acquisition and distribution; television networks; digital content creation and distribution; operation of studio facilities; and development of new entertainment products, services and technologies.

Pascal has overseen the production and distribution of many films, including the Spider-Man franchise; the James Bond films Casino Royale, Quantum of Solace and Skyfall, the first Bond film to gross over $1 billion at the worldwide box office; The Da Vinci Code and Angels & Demons; Sony Pictures Animation's The Smurfs, Cloudy with a Chance of Meatballs, and Hotel Transylvania; and Best Picture Oscar nominees American Hustle, Captain Phillips, Zero Dark Thirty, Moneyball and The Social Network.

Pascal, along with Lynton, also oversaw Sony Pictures Television, which produces and distributes television programming for multiple platforms in the U.S. and internationally.

In 2013, Pascal was elected to the Board of Governors of the Academy of Motion Picture Arts and Sciences.

She clashed with investor Daniel S. Loeb, who accused both Pascal and Lynton of "poor financial controls." According to the Financial Times: "She employed an assistant who earned more than $250,000 a year, and had use of a private jet and other perks in keeping with Hollywood's golden era rather than an age of austerity". At the end of 2014, Pascal was the only woman at Sony to earn over $1 million per annum, having earned US$3 million a year.

Pascal's contract with Sony was scheduled to expire in March 2015. On February 5, 2015, Pascal announced she would step down in May 2015. Pascal stated during a Women in the World discussion on February 11, 2015, that she had been "fired" by Sony.

=== Pascal Pictures ===
Pascal Pictures, Inc.
- Logo used since 2018
- Type: Independent
- Industry: Film Production
- Founded: 2016; 10 years ago
- Founder: Amy Pascal
- Headquarters: United States
- Key people: Amy Pascal (Founder & President)

Pascal started her own production company, with a four-year contract for funding and distribution via Sony Pictures Entertainment. The company, called Pascal Pictures, hired Rachel O'Connor as production chief and Ian Dalrymple to open and run a New York branch. Pascal Pictures was expected to continue Amy Pascal's "book-friendly" focus, and Dalrymple's office was expected to facilitate this. The company's first production was the reboot Ghostbusters (2016). She subsequently produced Spider-Man: Homecoming with Marvel Studios, in addition to theatre and television work. TriStar President Hannah Minghella obtained rights to Maestra by L. S. Hilton with the intent for Pascal to produce the film. Pascal Pictures made a winning bid for a memoir by Zoë Quinn about "Gamergate" called Crash Override: How to Save the Internet from Itself, which was sold to Touchstone/Simon & Schuster for publication in September 2016. Pascal and Elizabeth Cantillon optioned the rights for a TriStar TV series based on books by Eve Babitz set in 1960s-1970s Los Angeles. For a sum in the "mid-six to seven figures", Pascal made a deal for Michael Diliberti's Athena, about a descendant of the goddess Athena who is recruited to a secret organization. Together with Sony, Pascal obtained rights for the TV crime drama Darktown, which she plans to executive produce with Jamie Foxx.

In May 2019, it was announced that Pascal and her production company Pascal Pictures was leaving Sony and moving to Universal Pictures for a first-look deal after 30 years at Sony Pictures.

In March 2025, Amazon MGM Studios announced that Pascal and David Heyman would oversee the James Bond film franchise moving forward and produce future installments in the series through their Pascal Pictures and Heyday Films banners, respectively. Shortly afterwards, she had moved from Universal to MGM for a first-look deal.

=== Activities and awards ===
In 2001, Pascal was honored with the Women in Film's Crystal Award, which recognizes those whose work has helped to expand the role of women in the entertainment industry. Pascal has been included in The Hollywood Reporter's annual Women in Entertainment Power 100 list and Forbes' ranking of the World's 100 Most Powerful Women. As of 2014, she was ranked as the 28th most powerful woman in the world by Forbes, up from 36th in 2013.

In March 2024, Pascal was one of 1000 Jewish figures in Hollywood who signed an open letter denouncing Jonathan Glazer's acceptance speech at the 96th Academy Awards, in which Glazer condemned the Israeli occupation of the Palestinian Territories and new comparisons between Israel and Nazi Germany.

== Philanthropy ==
Pascal serves on the Honorary Committee of the Epilepsy Foundation of Greater Los Angeles. She has made charitable contributions to Teen Line.

She was awarded the 2008 Humanitarian Award from the Simon Wiesenthal Center, a non-profit organization based in Los Angeles which combats antisemitism and promotes human rights and tolerance. She received the award at the 2008 National Tribute Dinner, an annual fundraiser which raised US$2 million for the center. In her acceptance speech, she said: "I believe in what the museum is committed to: not just the literal event of the Holocaust but not letting anything like that happen again."

== Sony Pictures hack ==
On December 9, 2014, a group called "Guardians of Peace" hacked into Sony's computer system, which led to the theft of internal company documents. The fallout became a major international diplomatic incident in North Korea–United States relations.

=== Racist comments ===
In subsequent news coverage, Pascal and producer Scott Rudin were noted to have had an exchange in these documents about Pascal's upcoming encounter with President Barack Obama. Pascal joked that the president, who is black, would possibly enjoy Django Unchained and The Butler (films which deal with slavery in the United States and the pre-civil rights era) or the comedy Think Like a Man which features an ensemble cast of black comedians. Rudin responded: "Ride Along, I bet he likes Kevin Hart."

News reports branded the exchange as "racially insensitive", while others called it "racist". Pascal responded by saying that "the content of my emails were insensitive and inappropriate but are not an accurate reflection of who I am."

Civil rights leader Al Sharpton suggested the apology was not sufficient, compared her to Donald Sterling, and called for more diversity in Sony's hiring pool. The screenwriter and producer Aaron Sorkin denounced the media's focus on Pascal's communications and many other emails released by the hack in an opinion piece for The New York Times, characterizing the coverage as "giving material aid to criminals" and writing that "at least the hackers are doing it for a cause. The press is doing it for a nickel." In the popular press, coverage of the story was extended, with actress and producer Lisa Kudrow suggesting that Pascal should have known better, adding: "Don't write anything you don't want broadcast". At the Writers Guild of America Awards 2014 on January 7, 2015, Kudrow, who was the presenter, mentioned the Sony hack again, arguing that it was disturbing "because Scott Rudin and Amy Pascal thought that was witty banter".

Color of Change, a civil rights organization, launched a petition in December 2014 calling upon Sony to fire Pascal from her role, arguing that "Pascal's comments are confirmation of the manipulative, exploitative relationship corporations like Sony have with Black folks." They added: "We must hold Pascal accountable here; not just for her horrendous comments, but also for her role at the helm of a corporate agenda that views Black America as one big, lucrative joke."

In a 2020 interview with Vulture, Thandiwe Newton accused Pascal of making racially insensitive and demeaning demands of her for the film remake of Charlie's Angels, a film Newton ended up declining to star in due to Pascal's alleged behavior. Pascal responded by stating she was "horrified" by the story and had no recollection of it.

=== Gender pay gap ===
After Pascal left Sony, she was interviewed about Sony Entertainment's gender pay gap that had been exposed by the leaks. Tina Brown asked Pascal to explain why actresses did not realize that they were being paid less than male actors. Pascal said: "People want to work for less money. I'll pay them less money. I don't call them up and go, 'Can I give you some more?' ... what women have to do is not work for less money.... People should know what they're worth and say no."

Women making less than their male counterparts and male co-stars learned of the difference from the hack. The difference between what men and women made was pervasive at Sony Pictures under Pascal, with only one female out of the seventeen studio executives earning more than $1 million per year according to the unconfirmed emails, and Columbia Pictures co-presidents of production Michael De Luca and Hannah Minghella serving in identical jobs but with a million dollar difference in pay.

== Personal life ==
Pascal married Bernard Weinraub, a former foreign correspondent for The New York Times and playwright, in 1997, with whom she has a son. They reside in Brentwood, Los Angeles.

== Filmography ==
=== Film ===
Year	Title					
Year	Title	Director(s)	Distributor(s)	Budget(s)	Gross	Rotten Tomatoes
2016	Ghostbusters	Paul Feig	Sony Pictures Releasing	$144 million	$229.1 million	74%
2017	Spider-Man: Homecoming	Jon Watts	Sony Pictures Releasing	$175 million	$880.2 million	92%
2017	Molly's Game	Aaron Sorkin	STX Entertainment	$30 million	$59.3 million	82%
2017	The Post	Steven Spielberg	20th Century Fox	$50 million	$179.8 million	88%
2018	Venom	Ruben Fleischer	Sony Pictures Releasing	$100 million	$855 million	31%
2018	The Girl in the Spider's Web	Fede Álvarez	Sony Pictures Releasing	$43 million	$35 million	41%
2018	Spider-Man: Into the Spider-Verse	Bob Persichetti; Peter Ramsey; Rodney Rothman	Sony Pictures Releasing	$90 million	$358.7 million	97%
2019	Spider-Man: Far From Home	Jon Watts	Sony Pictures Releasing	$160 million	$1.132 billion	90%
2019	Little Women	Greta Gerwig	Sony Pictures Releasing	$42 million	$206 million	95%
2021	Venom: Let There Be Carnage	Andy Serkis	Sony Pictures Releasing	$110 million	$506.9 million	58%
2021	Spider-Man: No Way Home	Jon Watts	Sony Pictures Releasing	$200 million	$1.920 billion	93%
2023	Spider-Man: Across the Spider-Verse	Joaquim Dos Santos; Kemp Powers; Justin K. Thompson	Sony Pictures Releasing	$100 million	$675.4 million	95%
2024	Challengers	Luca Guadagnino	Amazon MGM Studios	$55 million	$94.2 million	88%
2024	Venom: The Last Dance	Kelly Marcel	Sony Pictures Releasing	$120 million	$478 million	37%
2025	Jay Kelly	Noah Baumbach	Netflix	N/A	N/A	75%
2026	Project Hail Mary	Phil Lord; Christopher Miller	Amazon MGM Studios	$248 million	$684 million	95%
2026	Spider-Man: Brand New Day	Destin Daniel Cretton	Sony Pictures Releasing	$225 million	$2.412 billion	90%
2027	Narnia: The Magician's Nephew	Greta Gerwig	Netflix	$200 million		
2027	Spider-Man: Beyond the Spider-Verse	Bob Persichetti; Justin K. Thompson	Sony Pictures Releasing			

=== Television ===
Year	Title	Creator(s)	Network	Note(s)
2025	Long Bright River	Nikki Toscano; Liz Moore	Peacock	
2026	Spider-Noir	Oren Uziel	MGM+ Amazon Prime Video	Also developer

== Awards and nominations ==
Year	Awards	Category	Work	Result	Ref(s)
2001	Women in Film Crystal + Lucy Awards	Crystal Award	—	Won	
2003	Hollywood Film Awards	Hollywood Leadership Award	—	Won	
2010	Producers Guild of America Awards	Milestone Award	—	Won	
2018	Producers Guild of America Awards	Outstanding Producer of Theatrical Motion Pictures	Molly's Game	Nominated	
2018	Producers Guild of America Awards	Outstanding Producer of Theatrical Motion Pictures	The Post	Nominated	
2018	Academy Awards	Best Picture	The Post	Nominated	
2019	Golden Globe Awards	Best Animated Feature Film (Note: The Best Motion Picture Award for the Animated category is given to the accredited director(s) and the individual producer(s) accredited by the Producers Guild of America for that motion picture.)	Spider-Man: Into the Spider-Verse	Won	
2019	Producers Guild of America Awards	Outstanding Producer of Animated Theatrical Motion Pictures	Spider-Man: Into the Spider-Verse	Won	
2020	Academy Awards	Best Picture	Little Women	Nominated	
2020	Producers Guild of America Awards	Outstanding Producer of Theatrical Motion Pictures	Little Women	Nominated	
2024	Golden Globe Awards	Best Animated Feature Film	Spider-Man: Across the Spider-Verse	Nominated	
2024	Producers Guild of America Awards	Outstanding Producer of Animated Theatrical Motion Pictures	Spider-Man: Across the Spider-Verse	Won	
2024	British Academy Film Awards	Best Animated Film	Spider-Man: Across the Spider-Verse	Nominated	
2024	Academy Awards	Best Animated Feature	Spider-Man: Across the Spider-Verse	Nominated	
