= Anna Karenina (2012 film) =

2012 historical romantic drama film by Joe Wright

- UK theatrical release poster
- Directed by: Joe Wright
- Screenplay by: Tom Stoppard
- Based on: Anna Karenina by Leo Tolstoy
- Produced by: Tim Bevan; Eric Fellner; Paul Webster
- Starring: Keira Knightley; Jude Law; Aaron Taylor-Johnson; Kelly Macdonald; Matthew Macfadyen; Domhnall Gleeson; Ruth Wilson; Alicia Vikander; Olivia Williams; Emily Watson
- Cinematography: Seamus McGarvey
- Edited by: Melanie Oliver
- Music by: Dario Marianelli
- Production companies: Working Title Films; StudioCanal
- Distributed by: Universal Pictures (Select territories); Focus Features (United States)
- Release dates: 7 September 2012 (United Kingdom); 16 November 2012 (United States)
- Running time: 130 minutes
- Countries: United Kingdom; United States
- Language: English
- Budget: $40.6 million
- Box office: $68.9 million

Anna Karenina is a 2012 historical romantic drama film directed by Joe Wright. Adapted by Tom Stoppard from Leo Tolstoy's 1878 novel, the film depicts the tragedy of Russian aristocrat and socialite Anna Karenina, wife of senior statesman Alexei Karenin, and her affair with the affluent cavalry officer Count Vronsky. Keira Knightley stars as the titular character; this is her third collaboration with director Joe Wright following Pride & Prejudice (2005) and Atonement (2007). Jude Law and Aaron Taylor-Johnson appear as Karenin and Vronsky, respectively. Matthew Macfadyen, Kelly Macdonald, Domhnall Gleeson, and Alicia Vikander appear in key supporting roles.

Produced by Working Title Films in association with StudioCanal, the film premiered at the 2012 Toronto Film Festival. It was released on 7 September 2012 in the United Kingdom and on 16 November 2012 in the United States. Anna Karenina earned a worldwide gross of approximately $69 million, mostly from its international run. The film received mostly positive reviews: critics praised the cast, but commented on and criticized the heavily stylized adaptation, and were less enthusiastic with Wright's preference for style over substance and his idea of setting most of the action on a theatre stage.

It earned four nominations at the 85th Academy Awards and six nominations at the 66th British Academy Film Awards, winning Jacqueline Durran both the Academy Award and the BAFTA Award for Best Costume Design. In addition, Anna Karenina garnered six nominations at the 17th Satellite Awards, including Best Actress for Knightley and Best Adapted Screenplay for Stoppard.

== Plot ==
In the Russian Empire in 1874, Princess Darya, nicknamed "Dolly", banishes her unfaithful husband, Prince Stephan "Stiva" Oblonsky. Stiva's sister, Anna Karenina, a socialite living in Saint Petersburg with her older husband Count Alexei Karenin and son Seryozha, travels to Moscow to persuade Dolly to forgive her brother.

Stiva meets old friend Konstantin "Kostya" Levin, a landowning aristocrat despised by Moscow's elite for preferring the countryside to city life. Levin says he loves Stiva's sister-in-law, Princess Kitty, and Stiva encourages him to propose. Kitty declines as she hopes to marry Count Alexei Vronsky, a wealthy officer. Levin meets his older brother Nikolai, who has renounced his inheritance and lives as man and wife with Masha, a prostitute. Nikolai suggests that Levin should marry a peasant. On the train, Anna meets Vronsky's mother, Countess Vronskaya, isolated by her own infidelities. Anna meets Vronsky and they are instantly attracted to each other. Anna eventually convinces Dolly to take Stiva back. At a ball, Kitty dances once with Vronsky, but throughout the evening he prefers Anna, upsetting Kitty. Vronsky tells Anna he must be wherever she goes.

Back in Saint Petersburg, Vronsky and Anna soon begin to stir gossip. Even though he has a promotion awaiting him in Tashkent, he refuses it and Anna agrees that she does not want him to leave. They later meet and make love.

Stiva informs Levin that Kitty and Vronsky will not be married. Levin focuses on country life and contemplates marrying a peasant's daughter.

Anna and Seryozha go to the Karenin estate outside Saint Petersburg. Anna visits Vronsky and reveals her pregnancy, and he wants her to leave Karenin. Anna suggests that Karenin come to the horse races but betrays her feelings when Vronsky's horse falls. Afterward, Anna admits to her husband she is Vronsky's mistress and Karenin says she must renounce him. Levin realises he still loves Kitty. Months later, Anna receives Vronsky. He tells her that his military duties have delayed his visit. Karenin discovers that Vronsky visited Anna and steals his letters to give himself grounds for a divorce.

Karenin visits Stiva and Dolly to say he is divorcing Anna. They beg him to forgive her, but he refuses. Levin and Kitty, having reunited, announce their love and marry. Anna goes into premature labour and sends for Vronsky, although she later says he could never be the man Karenin is. Karenin returns, believing Anna is dying and forgives her. Anna survives and decides to stay with her husband.

Vronsky persuades Anna to change her mind and they leave for Italy with their daughter, Anya.

Levin and Kitty return to his estate, where a sickly Nikolai lives with Masha in a storeroom. Levin tells Kitty he will send Masha away so Kitty does not have to meet her, but Kitty ignores societal norms to help Masha nurse Nikolai. Levin's love for Kitty grows.

Anna returns to Saint Petersburg for Seryozha's birthday, but Karenin dismisses her. Anna begins to suspect Vronsky of infidelity. She attends the opera with Princess Myagkaya, an outspoken socialite, but the rest of the audience shuns her. Humiliated, Anna retains her poise, only to break down at her hotel. She uses morphine to sleep.

Dolly tells her that Kitty is in Moscow to give birth. Dolly says Stiva's behaviour is unchanged, but she has come to accept and love him.

Vronsky informs Anna he must meet his mother for business. Anna becomes upset when Princess Sorokina brings Vronsky back to his home, as she believes Countess Vronskaya wants Vronsky to marry her. Anna returns to Vronsky's estate. On the train, she imagines Vronsky and Princess Sorokina making love and laughing at her. Arriving in Moscow, Anna says to herself, "Oh God. Forgive me," and jumps under a train. The scene flashes to a shocked Vronsky.

Levin returns home from work to find Kitty bathing their child. Stiva and his family eat with Levin and Kitty. Karenin, retired, is seen at his estate, with Seryozha and Anya playing.

== Cast ==
- Keira Knightley as Anna Arkadievna Karenina
- Jude Law as Alexei Alexandrovich Karenin, a senior statesman and Anna's husband
- Aaron Taylor-Johnson as Count Alexei Kirillovich Vronsky, lover of Anna, a cavalry officer
- Matthew Macfadyen as Prince Stepan "Stiva" Arkadyevich Oblonsky, Anna's brother, a civil servant
- Kelly Macdonald as Princess Darya "Dolly" Alexandrovna Oblonskaya, Stiva's wife
- Alicia Vikander as Princess Ekaterina "Kitty" Alexandrovna Shcherbatskaya, Dolly's younger sister
- Domhnall Gleeson as Konstantin "Kostya" Dmitrievich Levin, a landowner and friend of Stiva
- Olivia Williams as Countess Vronskaya, Vronsky's mother
- Ruth Wilson as Princess Elizaveta "Betsy" Tverskaya, Vronsky's cousin
- Emily Watson as Countess Lidia Ivanovna, leader of a high society circle that includes Karenin
- Michelle Dockery as Princess Myagkaya, a friend of Anna
- Raphaël Personnaz as Count Alexander "Sasha" Kirillovich Vronsky, Alexei's brother
- David Wilmot as Nikolai Dmitrievich Levin, Konstantin's brother
- Emerald Fennell as Princess Merkalova
- Tannishtha Chatterjee as Maria "Masha" Nikolaevna, Nikolai's wife, a former prostitute
- Kyle Soller as Korsunsky

Pip Torrens and Susanne Lothar play Prince Shcherbatsky and Princess Shcherbatskaya, parents to Dolly and Kitty. Alexandra Roach plays Countess Nordston. Holliday Grainger plays an unnamed Baroness. Cara Delevingne has a non-speaking role as the younger Princess Sorokina.

Bill Skarsgård makes a brief appearance as Makhotin, while Shirley Henderson appears near the end of the film as an outraged theatre patron. Steve Evets plays Theodore, one of the peasants who work for Konstantin.

John Bradley makes an uncredited cameo appearance as an Austrian prince near the start of the film, while Vicky McClure makes an uncredited cameo appearance as a peasant woman who catches Konstantin's eye.

== Production ==
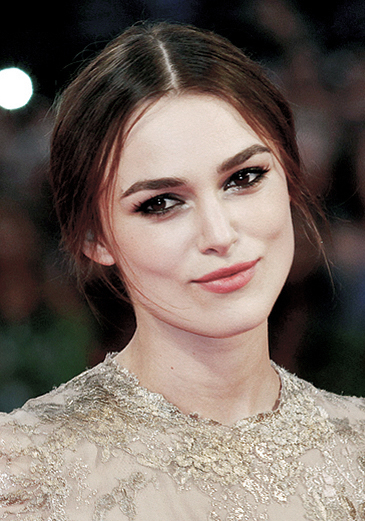
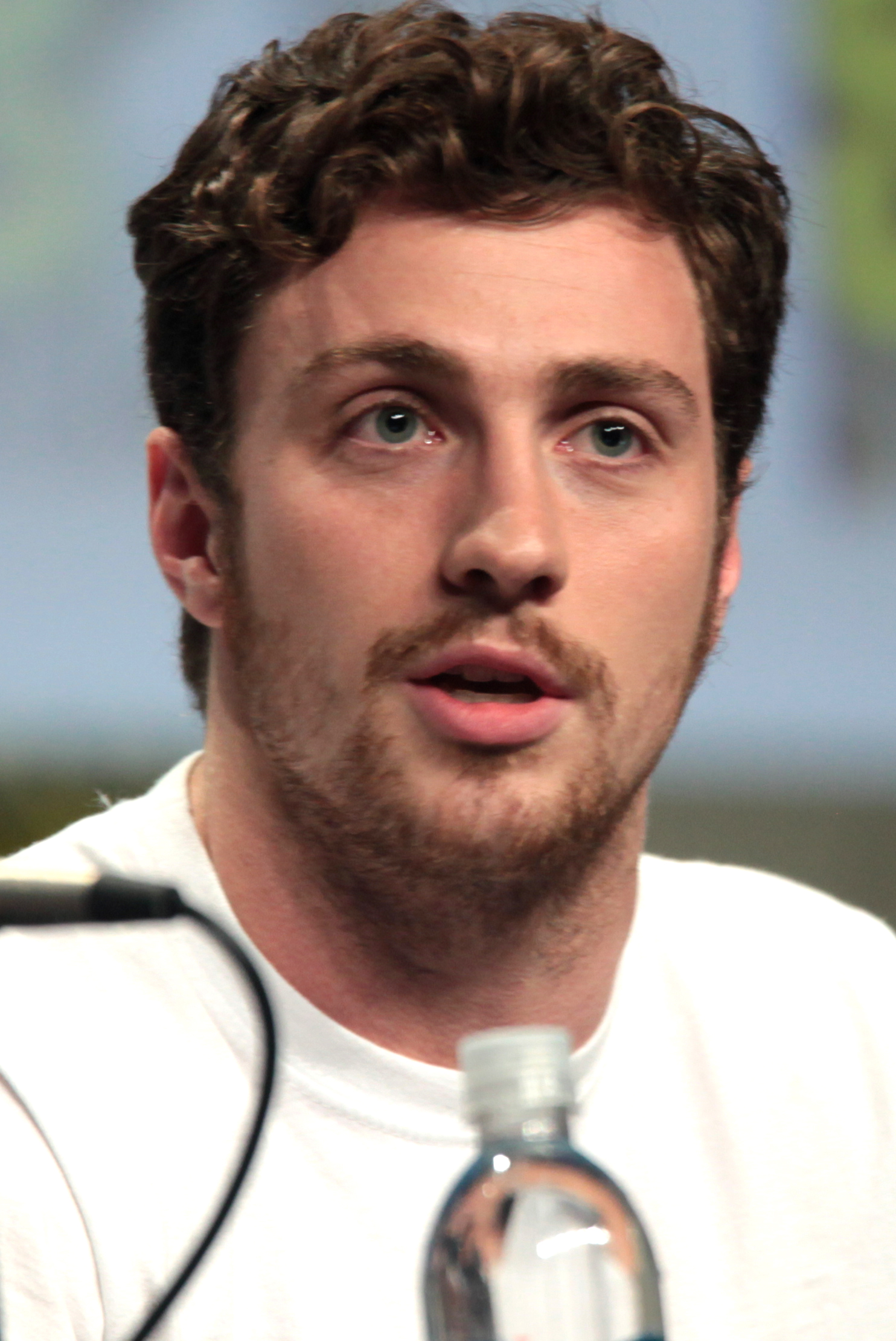
Anna Karenina marked Knightley's third collaboration with director Joe Wright and debut alongside Taylor-Johnson.

Joe Wright was hired to direct an adaptation of the Leo Tolstoy novel Anna Karenina, his fourth collaboration with Working Title Films. Wright shot most of his film on a single soundstage, representing a dilapidated theatre, at Shepperton Studios outside London. Italian composer Dario Marianelli composed the film score, while Jacqueline Durran was the costume designer. Sarah Greenwood was in charge of production design. Wright has worked with all three on past productions, including the 2005 film Pride & Prejudice. Further crew members include cinematographer Seamus McGarvey, editor Melanie Ann Oliver, and choreographer Sidi Larbi Cherkaoui.

=== Casting ===
The cast includes Keira Knightley as Anna, Jude Law as her husband, Aaron Taylor-Johnson as Vronsky, and Irish actor Domhnall Gleeson as Konstantin Levin, as well as Kelly Macdonald, Olivia Williams, Matthew Macfadyen, Michelle Dockery, and Tannishtha Chatterjee. Saoirse Ronan and Andrea Riseborough were initially cast in the film, but dropped out and were replaced by Alicia Vikander and Ruth Wilson, respectively. Ronan stated that her reasoning behind turning down the role of Kitty was the film's long production schedule. It would have required her to turn down movie roles from autumn 2011 to late spring 2012, to film a supporting role. By turning down the role, she was able to take the lead roles in Byzantium and The Host. The Borgias star Holliday Grainger had a minor role as Baroness Shilton.

=== Filming ===
In July 2011, Keira Knightley began rehearsals, in preparation for principal filming which began later in 2011. Filming began in October 2011. The film was distributed by Focus Features in North America and by Universal Pictures International for international markets. The film was released on 7 September 2012 in the United Kingdom and 9 November 2012 in the United States.

== Critical reception ==
On review aggregator Rotten Tomatoes, the film holds an approval rating of 63% based on 192 reviews, with an average rating of 6.5/10. The website's critics consensus reads: "Joe Wright's energetic adaptation of Tolstoy's classic romance is a bold, visually stylized work – for both better and worse." On Metacritic, the film has a weighted average score of 63 out of 100, based on 41 critics, indicating "generally favorable" reviews.

Oliver Lyttleton of The Playlist awarded the film a B+ and called the picture a "bold reimagining" of the classic novel, comparing Wright's vision to the films of Powell and Pressburger. He noted how Knightley "continues to go from strength to strength" and also praised Law as "excellent". Even though he speculated that "the film is going to divide people enormously", he concluded it was one to "cherish despite its flaws". Ian Freer of Empire awarded the film four stars out of five and was effervescent in his praise for Wright and the final result: he said "Anna Karenina militantly doesn't want to be just another costume drama; it attacks the heavyweight concerns of Russian literature (hypocrisy, jealousy, faith, fidelity, the pastoral vs. the urban, huge mustaches) with wit and verve; most exciting of all, it is filmmaking of the highest order, channeling every other art form from painting to ballet to puppetry while remaining completely cinematic". He lauded the entire cast for their work yet concluded that "this is really its director's movie".

In The Observer, Jason Solomons also called Knightley "superb", and declared that the film "works beautifully...[it is] elegant and exciting [and] ...incredibly cinematic". Leslie Felperin of Variety was more reserved in her praise for the film, observing that although Wright "knows how to get the best from Knightley" and noting that the film was technically "glorious", it was also "unmistakably chilly" in the storytelling. The Daily Mirror singled out Knightley as "excellent" and lauded Wright for "offer[ing] a fresh vision of the Tolstoy classic", concluding the picture to be "with its beautiful cinematography and costumes... a real success".

Others were less impressed with the film and Wright's take on such a classic text. The Hertfordshire Mercury conceded that "costumes and art direction are ravishing, and Seamus McGarvey's cinematography shimmers with rich colour", but ultimately found there to be "no obvious method behind this production design madness". Stella Papamichael of Digital Spy also awarded the picture only two stars out of five, commenting that "the third time isn't such a charm for director Joe Wright and muse Keira Knightley". Although she found the actress "luminous in the role" she criticised Wright for "outshining" his star and affecting the narrative momentum by "favouring a glossy look over probing insights into a complicated character". Neil Smith of Total Film also awarded the film two out of five stars, lamenting the fact that Wright's elaborate stage design "pull[s] the attention away from where it should be... [and] keeps [us] at arm's length, forever highlighting the smoke, mirrors and meticulous stage management that have been pressed into service to make his big idea a reality". He also dismissed Knightley's performance as "less involving" than her "similar" turn in The Duchess. Richard Brody of The New Yorker criticized Wright for diverging from Tolstoy, without adding anything beyond superficialities in return: "Wright, with flat and flavorless images of an utterly impersonal banality, takes Tolstoy's plot and translates it into a cinematic language that's the equivalent of, say, Danielle Steel, simultaneously simplistic and overdone."

=== Accolades ===
Award	Category	Recipients	Result
Academy Awards	Best Cinematography	Seamus McGarvey	Nominated
Academy Awards	Best Costume Design	Jacqueline Durran	Won
Academy Awards	Best Original Score	Dario Marianelli	Nominated
Academy Awards	Best Production Design	Sarah Greenwood, Katie Spencer	Nominated
Alliance of Women Film Journalists	Best Depiction of Nudity, Sexuality, or Seduction	Keira Knightley and Aaron Taylor-Johnson	Nominated
Alliance of Women Film Journalists	Movie You Wanted to Love But Just Couldn't		Won
British Academy Film Awards	Outstanding British Film	Joe Wright, Tim Bevan, Eric Fellner, Paul Webster, Tom Stoppard	Nominated
British Academy Film Awards	Best Original Music	Dario Marianelli	Nominated
British Academy Film Awards	Best Cinematography	Seamus McGarvey	Nominated
British Academy Film Awards	Best Production Design	Sarah Greenwood, Katie Spencer	Nominated
British Academy Film Awards	Best Costume Design	Jacqueline Durran	Won
British Academy Film Awards	Best Makeup and Hair	Ivana Primorac	Nominated
Critics' Choice Awards	Best Art Direction	Katie Spencer; Sarah Greenwood	Won
Critics' Choice Awards	Best Costume Design	Jacqueline Durran	Won
European Film Awards	Best Production Designer	Sarah Greenwood	Won
European Film Awards	Best Actor	Jude Law	Nominated
European Film Awards	Best Actress	Keira Knightley	Nominated
European Film Awards	Best Screenwriter	Tom Stoppard	Nominated
European Film Awards	People's Choice Award		Nominated
Golden Globe Award	Best Original Score	Dario Marianelli	Nominated
Hamptons International Film Festival	Breakthrough Performer	Domhnall Gleeson; Alicia Vikander	Won
Hollywood Film Festival	Hollywood Film Award for Production Designer of the Year	Sarah Greenwood	Won
Houston Film Critics Society	Worst Film		Nominated
Las Vegas Film Critics Society Awards	Best Costume Design	Jacqueline Durran	Won
San Diego Film Critics Society Awards	Best Production Design	Sarah Greenwood	Nominated
Satellite Awards 2012	Best Actress – Motion Picture	Keira Knightley	Nominated
Satellite Awards 2012	Best Adapted Screenplay	Tom Stoppard	Nominated
Satellite Awards 2012	Best Art Direction and Production Design	Thomas Brown; Nick Gottschalk; Sarah Greenwood; Niall Moroney; Tom Still	Nominated
Satellite Awards 2012	Best Cinematography	Seamus McGarvey	Nominated
Satellite Awards 2012	Best Costume Design	Jacqueline Durran	Nominated
Satellite Awards 2012	Best Original Score	Dario Marianelli	Nominated

== See also ==
- Adaptations of Anna Karenina
