= Jacqueline Durran =

British costume designer

- Born: January 1966 (age 60)
- Occupation: Costume designer
- Years active: 2001–present

Jacqueline Durran (born January 1966) is a British costume designer. She has received numerous accolades, including two Academy Awards, three BAFTA Film Awards, a BAFTA Television Award, and two Costume Designers Guild Awards.

Durran frequently collaborated with directors Mike Leigh, Joe Wright, and Greta Gerwig. She has received nine nominations for the Academy Award for Best Costume Design and has won twice for Anna Karenina (2012) and Little Women (2019). She has also been nominated for the BAFTA Award for Best Costume Design 11 times and had three wins for Vera Drake (2004), Anna Karenina, and Little Women.

== Early life ==
Durran grew up in London and studied at the Royal College of Art. Prior to becoming a costume designer, she worked selling vintage clothes at Camden Market and Portobello Road market, before getting a job with Angels Costumes.

== Filmography ==
=== Film ===
Year	Title	Director	Notes
2001	Dog	Andrea Arnold	Short film
2002	All or Nothing	Mike Leigh	
2003	Young Adam	David Mackenzie	
2004	Yes	Sally Potter	
2004	Vera Drake	Mike Leigh	
2005	Pride & Prejudice	Joe Wright	
2007	Atonement	Joe Wright	
2008	Happy-Go-Lucky	Mike Leigh	
2009	The Soloist	Joe Wright	
2010	Nanny McPhee and the Big Bang	Susanna White	
2010	Another Year	Mike Leigh	
2011	Tinker Tailor Soldier Spy	Tomas Alfredson	
2012	A Running Jump	Mike Leigh	Short film
2012	Anna Karenina	Joe Wright	
2013	The Double	Richard Ayoade	
2014	Mr. Turner	Mike Leigh	
2015	Pan	Joe Wright	
2015	Macbeth	Justin Kurzel	
2017	Beauty and the Beast	Bill Condon	
2017	Darkest Hour	Joe Wright	
2018	Mary Magdalene	Garth Davis	
2018	Peterloo	Mike Leigh	
2019	1917	Sam Mendes	with David Crossman
2019	Little Women	Greta Gerwig	
2021	Cyrano	Joe Wright	with Massimo Cantini Parrini; Durran only designed costumes for Haley Bennett
2021	Spencer	Pablo Larraín	
2021	Princess & Peppernose	Joe Wright	Short film
2022	The Batman	Matt Reeves	
2022	Allelujah	Richard Eyre	
2023	Barbie	Greta Gerwig	
2024	Hard Truths	Mike Leigh	
2024	Blitz	Steve McQueen	
2025	Jay Kelly	Noah Baumbach	
2026	Wuthering Heights	Emerald Fennell	
2026	Tender Loving Care †	Mike Leigh	Post-production
2027	Narnia: The Magician's Nephew †	Greta Gerwig	Post-production

Key
†	Denotes films that have not yet been released

=== Television ===
Year	Title	Notes
2016	Black Mirror	Episode: "Nosedive"
2020	Talking Heads	Episode: "An Ordinary Woman"
2020	Small Axe	Five-part anthology film series; 2 episodes

== Theatre ==
Year	Production	Venue	Notes
2002–2003	Medea	Brooks Atkinson Theatre	Broadway

== Awards and nominations ==
Major associations

Academy Awards

Year	Category	Nominated work	Result	Ref.
2006	Best Costume Design	Pride & Prejudice	Nominated	
2008	Best Costume Design	Atonement	Nominated	
2013	Best Costume Design	Anna Karenina	Won	
2015	Best Costume Design	Mr. Turner	Nominated	
2018	Best Costume Design	Beauty and the Beast	Nominated	
2018	Best Costume Design	Darkest Hour	Nominated	
2020	Best Costume Design	Little Women	Won	
2022	Best Costume Design	Cyrano	Nominated	
2024	Best Costume Design	Barbie	Nominated	

BAFTA Awards

Year	Category	Nominated work	Result	Ref.
British Academy Film Awards
2005	Best Costume Design	Vera Drake	Won	
2006	Best Costume Design	Pride & Prejudice	Nominated	
2008	Best Costume Design	Atonement	Nominated	
2012	Best Costume Design	Tinker Tailor Soldier Spy	Nominated	
2013	Best Costume Design	Anna Karenina	Won	
2015	Best Costume Design	Mr. Turner	Nominated	
2018	Best Costume Design	Beauty and the Beast	Nominated	
2018	Best Costume Design	Darkest Hour	Nominated	
2020	Best Costume Design	Little Women	Won	
2024	Best Costume Design	Barbie	Nominated	
2025	Best Costume Design	Blitz	Nominated	
British Academy Television Craft Awards
2021	Best Costume Design	Small Axe (Episode: "Lovers Rock")	Won	

Miscellaneous awards

List of Jacqueline Durran other awards and nominations
Award	Year (Note: Indicates the year of ceremony. Each year is linked to the article about the awards held that year, wherever possible.)	Category	Title	Result	Ref.
AACTA Awards	2018	Best Costume Design	Mary Magdalene	Nominated	
Astra Film and Creative Arts Awards	2020	Best Costume Design	Little Women	Nominated	
Astra Film and Creative Arts Awards	2022	Best Costume Design	Spencer	Nominated	
Astra Film and Creative Arts Awards	2024	Best Costume Design	Barbie	Nominated	
British Independent Film Awards	2018	Best Costume Design	Peterloo	Nominated	
Capri Hollywood International Film Festival	2024	Best Costume Design	Barbie	Won	
Chicago Film Critics Association Awards	2019	Best Costume Design	Little Women	Won	
Chicago Film Critics Association Awards	2021	Best Costume Design	Spencer	Won	
Chicago Film Critics Association Awards	2023	Best Costume Design	Barbie	Nominated	
Costume Designers Guild Awards	2008	Excellence in Period Film	Atonement	Nominated	
Costume Designers Guild Awards	2013	Excellence in Period Film	Anna Karenina	Won	
Costume Designers Guild Awards	2018	Excellence in Sci-Fi/Fantasy Film	Beauty and the Beast	Nominated	
Costume Designers Guild Awards	2022	Excellence in Period Film	Cyrano	Nominated	
Costume Designers Guild Awards	2024	Excellence in Sci-Fi/Fantasy Film	Barbie	Won	
Critics' Choice Awards	2013	Best Costume Design	Anna Karenina	Won	
Critics' Choice Awards	2015	Best Costume Design	Mr. Turner	Nominated	
Critics' Choice Awards	2018	Best Costume Design	Beauty and the Beast	Nominated	
Critics' Choice Awards	2020	Best Costume Design	Little Women	Nominated	
Critics' Choice Awards	2024	Best Costume Design	Barbie	Won	
Evening Standard British Film Awards	2008	Technical Achievement	Atonement	Won (Note: Durran, as costume designer, along with production designer Sarah Greenwood and cinematographer Seamus McGarvey, received a joint award for their respective contributions to the same film.)	
Evening Standard British Film Awards	2013	Technical Achievement	Anna Karenina	Won	
Hollywood Film Awards	2017	Hollywood Costume Design Award	Beauty and the Beast and Darkest Hour	Won	
Las Vegas Film Critics Society Awards	2012	Best Costume Design	Anna Karenina	Won	
Las Vegas Film Critics Society Awards	2021	Best Costume Design	Spencer	Nominated	
Las Vegas Film Critics Society Awards	2023	Best Costume Design	Barbie	Nominated	
London Film Critics' Circle Awards	2013	Technical Achievement Award	Anna Karenina	Nominated	
London Film Critics' Circle Awards	2020	Technical Achievement Award	Little Women	Nominated	
Online Film Critics Society Awards	2022	Best Costume Design	Spencer	Nominated	
Online Film Critics Society Awards	2024	Best Costume Design	Barbie	Won	
Phoenix Film Critics Society Awards	2012	Best Costume Design	Anna Karenina	Won	
Phoenix Film Critics Society Awards	2017	Best Costume Design	Beauty and the Beast	Won	
Phoenix Film Critics Society Awards	2023	Best Costume Design	Barbie	Won	
San Diego Film Critics Society Awards	2017	Best Costume Design	Beauty and the Beast	Won (Note: Tied with Mark Bridges for Phantom Thread)	
San Diego Film Critics Society Awards	2019	Best Costume Design	Little Women	Nominated	
San Diego Film Critics Society Awards	2023	Best Costume Design	Barbie	Won	
Satellite Awards	2005	Best Costume Design	Pride & Prejudice	Won	
Satellite Awards	2007	Best Costume Design	Atonement	Nominated	
Satellite Awards	2012	Best Costume Design	Anna Karenina	Nominated	
Satellite Awards	2016	Best Costume Design	Macbeth	Nominated	
Satellite Awards	2018	Best Costume Design	Beauty and the Beast	Nominated	
Satellite Awards	2022	Best Costume Design	Spencer	Nominated	
Satellite Awards	2024	Best Costume Design	Barbie	Nominated	
Satellite Awards	2025	Best Costume Design	Blitz	Nominated	
Saturn Awards	2013	Best Costume Design	Anna Karenina	Nominated	
Saturn Awards	2018	Best Costume Design	Beauty and the Beast	Won	
Saturn Awards	2022	Best Costume Design	The Batman	Won	
Saturn Awards	2024	Best Costume Design	Barbie	Won	
Seattle Film Critics Society Awards (Note: prior to the SFCS formal establishment in 2016, a group of Seattle-area critics compiled the Seattle Film Critics Awards in 2014 and 2015.)	2015	Best Costume Design	Mr. Turner	Nominated	
Seattle Film Critics Society Awards	2017	Best Costume Design	Beauty and the Beast	Nominated	
Seattle Film Critics Society Awards	2017	Best Costume Design	Darkest Hour	Nominated	
Seattle Film Critics Society Awards	2019	Best Costume Design	Little Women	Nominated	
Seattle Film Critics Society Awards	2022	Best Costume Design	Spencer	Nominated	
Seattle Film Critics Society Awards	2024	Best Costume Design	Barbie	Won	
St. Louis Film Critics Association Awards	2021	Best Costume Design	Spencer	Runner-up	
St. Louis Film Critics Association Awards	2023	Best Costume Design	Barbie	Won	
