= Teen Line =

Non-profit teen help hotline in the U.S.

TEEN LINE is a non-profit nationwide teen help hotline based out of the Cedars-Sinai Medical Center in Los Angeles, California. Trained teen volunteers can be reached nightly by calling (800) 852-8336 from 6 pm to 10 pm PST or by texting "TEEN" to 839863 from 6 pm to 9pm PST.

TEEN LINE has been running since 1985, making it one of the oldest help hotlines in the country. Teen volunteers who are currently in (or about to enter) high school apply during the three training sessions a year (Summer, Spring, Fall) by completing a written application and an interview. All teens who are accepted into the program undergo a rigorous training process to ensure that they are ready to take calls. TEEN LINE volunteers also answer emails sent in through the online form on the TEEN LINE website, as well as by text. The teen volunteers are named Listeners to emphasize the importance of listening to a caller's issues rather than giving advice. Groups of teens and adults also make presentations, called Outreaches, about issues that the average teen faces at schools throughout Southern California.

TEEN LINE also publishes and distributes a resource called the Youth Yellow Pages, which is a small booklet filled with information and the phone numbers for specialized hotlines that tackle all sorts of issues a teen might have. The very same resource is used by Listeners while on the phone. It is now available as a free app on any smart phone and tablet.
