= Seattle Film Critics Society =

American film critics organization

- Seattle Film Critics Society logo
- Founded: 2016
- Purpose: Film criticism
- Headquarters: Seattle, Washington
- Location: Seattle, Washington
- President: Kathy Fennessy
- Website: seattlefilmcritics.com

The Seattle Film Critics Society (SFCS) is an organization of film critics based in the greater Seattle area and surrounding areas of Washington state. It is represented by 40 members who work in print, radio, television and online mediums. The society presents an annual awards announcement, honoring the best achievements in film, nominated and selected by all active members of the society.

In 2023, the category "Achievement in Pacific Northwest Filmmaking" was introduced to specifically honor Pacific Northwest filmmaking. The award is meant to celebrate the many talented filmmakers who call the region home and who produce work there. A nominating committee carefully considered a wide variety of feature films released during 2022 with strong connections to the region and selected five finalists. The winner was determined by a vote of the full membership and announced alongside the SFCS's other awards on January 17, 2023.

== Board of Directors ==
As of 2026, as listed on the organization's website:

- President – Chase Hutchinson
- Vice President – Josh Bis
- Treasurer – Taylor Baker
- Secretary – René Sanchez
- Awards Coordinator – Mike Ward
- Membership Coordinator – Calvin Kemph
- Communications Director – Marina Coates
- Trustees – Joan Amenn, Sara Michelle Fetters, Eric Zhu

== Categories ==
- Best Picture
- Best Director
- Best Actor in a Leading Role
- Best Actress in a Leading Role
- Best Actor in a Supporting Role
- Best Actress in a Supporting Role
- Best Ensemble Cast
- Best Screenplay
- Best Animated Feature
- Best Documentary Feature
- Best International Film
- Pacific Northwest Feature
- Pacific Northwest Short
- Best Cinematography
- Best Costume Design
- Best Film Editing
- Best Original Score
- Best Production Design
- Best Visual Effects
- Best Action Choreography
- Best Youth Performance
- Villain of the Year

== Ceremony information ==
Date	Most Nominations	Most Wins
January 5, 2017	La La Land / Moonlight (10)	Moonlight (6)
December 18, 2017	Blade Runner 2049 (8)	Lady Bird / Phantom Thread (3)
December 17, 2018	The Favourite (11)	Roma (4)
December 16, 2019	The Irishman (10)	Parasite (5)
February 15, 2021	Minari (8)	Nomadland (5)
January 17, 2022	The Power of the Dog (11)	Drive My Car (4)
January 17, 2023	Everything Everywhere All at Once (14)	Everything Everywhere All at Once (4)
January 8, 2024	Killers of the Flower Moon / Poor Things (11)	Godzilla Minus One / The Holdovers (3)
December 16, 2024	Dune: Part Two / Furiosa: A Mad Max Saga (10)	Anora (4)
December 15, 2025	Sinners (14)	One Battle After Another (8)

== SFCS Award for Best Picture of the Year ==
Year	Film	Distributor(s)
2016
2016	Moonlight	A24
2016	13th	Netflix
2016	Arrival	Paramount Pictures
2016	Elle	Sony Pictures Classics
2016	The Handmaiden	Amazon Studios / Magnolia Pictures
2016	Hell or High Water	CBS Films
2016	Jackie	Fox Searchlight Pictures
2016	La La Land	Lionsgate Films / Summit Entertainment
2016	Manchester by the Sea	Amazon Studios / Roadside Attractions
2016	The Witch	A24
2017
2017	Get Out	Universal Pictures
2017	Blade Runner 2049	Warner Bros.
2017	The Disaster Artist	A24
2017	Dunkirk	Warner Bros.
2017	The Florida Project	A24
2017	Lady Bird	A24
2017	Logan	20th Century Studios
2017	Phantom Thread	Focus Features
2017	The Post	20th Century Studios
2017	Three Billboards Outside Ebbing, Missouri	Fox Searchlight Pictures
2018
2018	Roma	Netflix
2018	Black Panther	Walt Disney Studios Motion Pictures
2018	Blindspotting	Lionsgate Films / Summit Entertainment
2018	The Favourite	Fox Searchlight Pictures
2018	First Reformed	A24
2018	If Beale Street Could Talk	Annapurna Pictures
2018	Mission: Impossible – Fallout	Paramount Pictures
2018	Paddington 2	Warner Bros.
2018	A Star Is Born	Warner Bros.
2018	Suspiria	Amazon Studios
2019
2019	Parasite	NEON
2019	1917	Universal Pictures
2019	The Farewell	A24
2019	Ford v Ferrari	20th Century Studios
2019	The Irishman	Netflix
2019	The Lighthouse	A24
2019	Little Women	Sony Pictures Releasing
2019	Marriage Story	Netflix
2019	Once Upon a Time in Hollywood	Sony Pictures Releasing
2019	Uncut Gems	A24
2020
2020	Nomadland	Searchlight Pictures
2020	First Cow	A24
2020	Hamilton	Walt Disney Studios Motion Pictures
2020	The Invisible Man	Universal Pictures
2020	Judas and the Black Messiah	Warner Bros.
2020	Minari	A24
2020	Never Rarely Sometimes Always	Focus Features
2020	Palm Springs	NEON
2020	Promising Young Woman	Focus Features
2020	Sound of Metal	Amazon Studios
2021
2021	Drive My Car	Janus Films
2021	CODA	Apple TV+
2021	Dune	Warner Bros.
2021	The Green Knight	A24
2021	In the Heights	Warner Bros.
2021	Licorice Pizza	MGM / United Artists Releasing
2021	Pig	NEON
2021	The Power of the Dog	Netflix
2021	Titane	NEON
2021	West Side Story	20th Century Studios
2022
2022	Everything Everywhere All at Once	A24
2022	Aftersun	A24
2022	The Banshees of Inisherin	Searchlight Pictures
2022	Cha Cha Real Smooth	Apple TV+
2022	Decision to Leave	MUBI
2022	The Fabelmans	Universal Pictures
2022	Glass Onion: A Knives Out Mystery	Netflix
2022	Nope	Universal Pictures
2022	Tár	Focus Features
2022	Top Gun: Maverick	Paramount Pictures
2023
2023	Past Lives	A24
2023	American Fiction	MGM / Orion Pictures
2023	Barbie	Warner Bros.
2023	The Holdovers	Focus Features
2023	Killers of the Flower Moon	Paramount Pictures / Apple TV+
2023	May December	Netflix
2023	Oppenheimer	Universal Pictures
2023	Poor Things	Searchlight Pictures
2023	Spider-Man: Across the Spider-Verse	Sony Pictures Releasing
2023	The Zone of Interest	A24
2024
2024	The Substance	Mubi
2024	Anora	Neon
2024	The Beast	Ad Vitam
2024	The Brutalist	A24
2024	Challengers	MGM
2024	Conclave	Focus Features
2024	Dune: Part Two	Warner Bros.
2024	Furiosa: A Mad Max Saga	Warner Bros.
2024	I Saw the TV Glow	A24
2024	Sing Sing	A24
2025
2025	One Battle After Another	Warner Bros.
2025	Bugonia	Focus Features
2025	Hamnet	Focus Features
2025	It Was Just an Accident	Neon
2025	Marty Supreme	A24
2025	Sentimental Value	Neon
2025	Sinners	Warner Bros.
2025	Sorry, Baby	A24
2025	Train Dreams	Netflix
2025	Weapons	Warner Bros.

== SFCS Award for Best Director ==
Year	Director(s)	Film
2016
2016	Barry Jenkins	Moonlight
2016	Damien Chazelle	La La Land
2016	Robert Eggers	The Witch
2016	Paul Verhoeven	Elle
2016	Denis Villeneuve	Arrival
2017
2017	Christopher Nolan	Dunkirk
2017	Sean Baker	The Florida Project
2017	Greta Gerwig	Lady Bird
2017	Jordan Peele	Get Out
2017	Denis Villeneuve	Blade Runner 2049
2018
2018	Alfonso Cuarón	Roma
2018	Bradley Cooper	A Star Is Born
2018	Barry Jenkins	If Beale Street Could Talk
2018	Yorgos Lanthimos	The Favourite
2018	Paul Schrader	First Reformed
2019
2019	Bong Joon-ho	Parasite
2019	Robert Eggers	The Lighthouse
2019	Greta Gerwig	Little Women
2019	Josh Safdie and Benny Safdie	Uncut Gems
2019	Martin Scorsese	The Irishman
2020
2020	Chloé Zhao	Nomadland
2020	Lee Isaac Chung	Minari
2020	Emerald Fennell	Promising Young Woman
2020	Steve McQueen	Lovers Rock
2020	Kelly Reichardt	First Cow
2021
2021	Ryûsuke Hamaguchi	Drive My Car
2021	Jane Campion	The Power of the Dog
2021	Julia Ducournau	Titane
2021	David Lowery	The Green Knight
2021	Denis Villeneuve	Dune
2022
2022	Daniel Kwan & Daniel Scheinert	Everything Everywhere All At Once
2022	Todd Field	TÁR
2022	Joseph Kosinski	Top Gun: Maverick
2022	Martin McDonagh	The Banshees of Inisherin
2022	Charlotte Wells	Aftersun
2023
2023	Martin Scorsese	Killers of the Flower Moon
2023	Greta Gerwig	Barbie
2023	Yorgos Lanthimos	Poor Things
2023	Christopher Nolan	Oppenheimer
2023	Celine Song	Past Lives
2024
2024	Sean Baker	Anora
2024	Bertrand Bonello	The Beast
2024	Brady Corbet	The Brutalist
2024	Coralie Fargeat	The Substance
2024	Denis Villeneuve	Dune: Part Two
2025
2025	Paul Thomas Anderson	One Battle After Another
2025	Clint Bentley	Train Dreams
2025	Ryan Coogler	Sinners
2025	Josh Safdie	Marty Supreme
2025	Chloé Zhao	Hamnet

== SFCS Award for Best Actor in a Leading Role ==
Year	Actor	Role	Film
2016
2016	Casey Affleck	Lee Chandler	Manchester by the Sea
2016	Ryan Gosling	Sebastian Wilder	La La Land
2016	Logan Lerman	Marcus Messner	Indignation
2016	Viggo Mortensen	Ben Cash	Captain Fantastic
2016	Denzel Washington	Troy Maxson	Fences
2017
2017	Daniel Day-Lewis	Reynolds Woodcock	Phantom Thread
2017	James Franco	Tommy Wiseau	The Disaster Artist
2017	Daniel Kaluuya	Chris Washington	Get Out
2017	Gary Oldman	Winston Churchill	Darkest Hour
2017	Robert Pattinson	Constantine "Connie" Nikas	Good Time
2018
2018	Ethan Hawke	Reverend Ernst Toller	First Reformed
2018	Bradley Cooper	Jackson Maine	A Star Is Born
2018	Daveed Diggs	Collin Hoskins	Blindspotting
2018	Rami Malek	Freddie Mercury	Bohemian Rhapsody
2018	Joaquin Phoenix	Joe	You Were Never Really Here
2019
2019	Adam Driver	Charlie Barber	Marriage Story
2019	Antonio Banderas	Salvador Mallo	Pain and Glory
2019	Robert De Niro	Frank Sheeran	The Irishman
2019	Joaquin Phoenix	Arthur Fleck / Joker	Joker
2019	Adam Sandler	Howard Ratner	Uncut Gems
2020
2020	Riz Ahmed	Ruben Stone	Sound of Metal
2020	Chadwick Boseman	Levee Green	Ma Rainey's Black Bottom
2020	Anthony Hopkins	Anthony	The Father
2020	Delroy Lindo	Paul	Da 5 Bloods
2020	Steven Yeun	Jacob Yi	Minari
2021
2021	Nicolas Cage	Robin "Rob" Feld	Pig
2021	Benedict Cumberbatch	Phil Burbank	The Power of the Dog
2021	Andrew Garfield	Jonathan Larson	Tick, Tick...BOOM!
2021	Dev Patel	Sir Gawain	The Green Knight
2021	Simon Rex	Mikey "Saber" Davies	Red Rocket
2022
2022	Colin Farrell	Pádraic Súilleabháin	The Banshees of Inisherin
2022	Austin Butler	Elvis Presley	Elvis
2022	Tom Cruise	Captain Pete "Maverick" Mitchell	Top Gun: Maverick
2022	Brendan Fraser	Charlie	The Whale
2022	Paul Mescal	Calum Patterson	Aftersun
2023
2023	Jeffrey Wright	Dr. Thelonious "Monk" Ellison	American Fiction
2023	Paul Giamatti	Paul Hunham	The Holdovers
2023	Cillian Murphy	J. Robert Oppenheimer	Oppenheimer
2023	Andrew Scott	Adam	All of Us Strangers
2023	Kôji Yakusho	Hirayama	Perfect Days
2024
2024	Colman Domingo	John "Divine G" Whitfield	Sing Sing
2024	Adrien Brody	László Tóth	The Brutalist
2024	Ralph Fiennes	Cardinal Thomas Lawrence	Conclave
2024	Keith Kupferer	Dan Mueller	Ghostlight
2024	George MacKay	Louis	The Beast

== SFCS Award for Best Actress in a Leading Role ==
Year	Actress	Role	Film
2016
2016	Isabelle Huppert	Michèle Leblanc	Elle
2016	Amy Adams	Dr. Louise Banks	Arrival
2016	Kate Beckinsale	Lady Susan Vernon	Love & Friendship
2016	Natalie Portman	Jackie Kennedy	Jackie
2016	Emma Stone	Mia Dolan	La La Land
2017
2017	Saoirse Ronan	Christine "Lady Bird" McPherson	Lady Bird
2017	Sally Hawkins	Elisa Esposito	The Shape of Water
2017	Frances McDormand	Mildred Hayes	Three Billboards Outside Ebbing, Missouri
2017	Margot Robbie	Tonya Harding	I, Tonya
2017	Meryl Streep	Katharine Graham	The Post
2018
2018	Toni Collette	Annie Graham	Hereditary
2018	Yalitza Aparicio	Cleodegaria "Cleo" Gutiérrez	Roma
2018	Olivia Colman	Queen Anne	The Favourite
2018	Lady Gaga	Ally Maine	A Star Is Born
2018	Regina Hall	Lisa Conroy	Support the Girls
2019
2019	Lupita Nyong'o	Adelaide Wilson / Red	Us
2019	Awkwafina	Billi Wang	The Farewell
2019	Scarlett Johansson	Nicole Barber	Marriage Story
2019	Saoirse Ronan	Josephine "Jo" March	Little Women
2019	Renée Zellweger	Judy Garland	Judy
2020
2020	Frances McDormand	Fern	Nomadland
2020	Viola Davis	Ma Rainey	Ma Rainey's Black Bottom
2020	Sidney Flanigan	Autumn	Never Rarely Sometimes Always
2020	Elisabeth Moss	Cecilia Kass	The Invisible Man
2020	Carey Mulligan	Cassandra "Cassie" Thomas	Promising Young Woman
2021
2021	Kristen Stewart	Diana, Princess of Wales	Spencer
2021	Alana Haim	Alana Kane	Licorice Pizza
2021	Lady Gaga	Patrizia Reggiani	House of Gucci
2021	Renate Reinsve	Julie	The Worst Person in the World
2021	Agathe Rousselle	Alexia/Adrien	Titane
2022
2022	Cate Blanchett	Lydia Tár	TÁR
2022	Danielle Deadwyler	Mamie Till-Mobley	Till
2022	Mia Goth	Pearl	Pearl
2022	Margot Robbie	Nellie LaRoy	Babylon
2022	Michelle Yeoh	Evelyn Quan Wang	Everything Everywhere All At Once
2023
2023	Lily Gladstone	Mollie Burkhart	Killers of the Flower Moon
2023	Sandra Hüller	Sandra Voyter	Anatomy of a Fall
2023	Greta Lee	Nora Moon	Past Lives
2023	Margot Robbie	Barbie	Barbie
2023	Emma Stone	Bella Baxter/Victoria Blessington	Poor Things
2024
2024	Mikey Madison	Anora "Ani" Mikheeva	Anora
2024	Cynthia Erivo	Elphaba Thropp	Wicked
2024	Marianne Jean-Baptiste	Pansy Deacon	Hard Truths
2024	Demi Moore	Elisabeth Sparkle	The Substance
2024	Léa Seydoux	Gabrielle	The Beast

== SFCS Award for Best Actor in a Supporting Role ==
Year	Actor	Role	Film
2016
2016	Mahershala Ali	Juan	Moonlight
2016	Jeff Bridges	Marcus Hamilton	Hell or High Water
2016	Kyle Chandler	Joseph Chandler	Manchester by the Sea
2016	John Goodman	Howard Stambler	10 Cloverfield Lane
2016	Lucas Hedges	Patrick Chandler	Manchester by the Sea
2017
2017	Willem Dafoe	Bobby Hicks	The Florida Project
2017	Barry Keoghan	Martin Lang	The Killing of a Sacred Deer
2017	Sam Rockwell	Jason Dixon	Three Billboards Outside Ebbing, Missouri
2017	Michael Shannon	Richard Strickland	The Shape of Water
2017	Patrick Stewart	Charles Xavier / Professor X	Logan
2018
2018	Richard E. Grant	Jack Hock	Can You Ever Forgive Me?
2018	Mahershala Ali	Don Shirley	Green Book
2018	Russell Hornsby	Maverick Carter	The Hate U Give
2018	Michael B. Jordan	Erik Killmonger	Black Panther
2018	Steven Yeun	Ben	Burning
2019
2019	Willem Dafoe	Thomas Wake	The Lighthouse
2019	Tom Hanks	Fred Rogers	A Beautiful Day in the Neighborhood
2019	Song Kang-ho	Kim Ki-taek	Parasite
2019	Joe Pesci	Russell Bufalino	The Irishman
2019	Brad Pitt	Cliff Booth	Once Upon a Time in Hollywood
2020
2020	Daniel Kaluuya	Fred Hampton	Judas and the Black Messiah
2020	Sacha Baron Cohen	Abbie Hoffman	The Trial of the Chicago 7
2020	Bill Murray	Felix Keane	On the Rocks
2020	Leslie Odom Jr.	Sam Cooke	One Night in Miami...
2020	Paul Raci	Joe	Sound of Metal
2021
2021	Kodi Smit-McPhee	Peter Gordon	The Power of the Dog
2021	Colman Domingo	Abegunde "X" Olawale	Zola
2021	Troy Kotsur	Frank Rossi	CODA
2021	Vincent Lindon	Vincent	Titane
2021	Jeffrey Wright	Roebuck Wright	The French Dispatch
2022
2022	Ke Huy Quan	Waymond Wang	Everything Everywhere All At Once
2022	Paul Dano	Burt Fabelman	The Fabelmans
2022	Brendan Gleeson	Colm Doherty	The Banshees of Inisherin
2022	Brian Tyree Henry	James Aucoin	Causeway
2022	Barry Keoghan	Dominic Kearney	The Banshees of Inisherin
2023
2023	Charles Melton	Joe Yoo	May December
2023	Sterling K. Brown	Dr. Clifford "Cliff" Ellison	American Fiction
2023	Robert De Niro	William King Hale	Killers of the Flower Moon
2023	Ryan Gosling	Ken	Barbie
2023	Mark Ruffalo	Duncan Wedderburn	Poor Things
2024
2024	Clarence Maclin	Himself	Sing Sing
2024	Kieran Culkin	Benjamin "Benji" Kaplan	A Real Pain
2024	Chris Hemsworth	Dementus	Furiosa: A Mad Max Saga
2024	Josh O'Connor	Patrick Zweig	Challengers
2024	Guy Pearce	Harrison Lee Van Buren	The Brutalist

== SFCS Award for Best Actress in a Supporting Role ==
Year	Actress	Role	Film
2016
2016	Viola Davis	Rose Maxson	Fences
2016	Lily Gladstone	Jamie / The Rancher	Certain Women
2016	Naomie Harris	Paula	Moonlight
2016	Kate McKinnon	Dr. Jillian Holtzmann	Ghostbusters
2016	Michelle Williams	Randi Chandler	Manchester by the Sea
2017
2017	Laurie Metcalf	Marion McPherson	Lady Bird
2017	Tiffany Haddish	Dina	Girls Trip
2017	Holly Hunter	Beth Gardner	The Big Sick
2017	Allison Janney	LaVona Golden	I, Tonya
2017	Lesley Manville	Cyril Woodcock	Phantom Thread
2018
2018	Regina King	Sharon Rivers	If Beale Street Could Talk
2018	Elizabeth Debicki	Alice Gunner	Widows
2018	Claire Foy	Janet Armstrong	First Man
2018	Emma Stone	Abigail Masham	The Favourite
2018	Rachel Weisz	Sarah Churchill	The Favourite
2019
2019	Jennifer Lopez	Ramona Vega	Hustlers
2019	Laura Dern	Nora Fanshaw	Marriage Story
2019	Florence Pugh	Amy March	Little Women
2019	Taylor Russell	Emily Williams	Waves
2019	Zhao Shu-zhen	Nai Nai	The Farewell
2020
2020	Youn Yuh-jung	Soon-ja	Minari
2020	Maria Bakalova	Tutar Sagdiyev	Borat Subsequent Moviefilm
2020	Olivia Colman	Anne	The Father
2020	Talia Ryder	Skylar	Never Rarely Sometimes Always
2020	Amanda Seyfried	Marion Davies	Mank
2021
2021	Ariana DeBose	Anita	West Side Story
2021	Ann Dowd	Linda	Mass
2021	Kirsten Dunst	Rose Gordon	The Power of the Dog
2021	Aunjanue Ellis	Oracene "Brandy" Price	King Richard
2021	Ruth Negga	Clare Bellew	Passing
2022
2022	Kerry Condon	Siobhán Súilleabháin	The Banshees of Inisherin
2022	Angela Bassett	Ramonda	Black Panther: Wakanda Forever
2022	Stephanie Hsu	Joy Wang	Everything Everywhere All At Once
2022	Janelle Monáe	Helen and Andi Brand	Glass Onion: A Knives Out Mystery
2022	Keke Palmer	Emerald "Em" Haywood	Nope
2023
2023	Da’Vine Joy Randolph	Mary Lamb	The Holdovers
2023	Danielle Brooks	Sofia	The Color Purple
2023	Penélope Cruz	Laura Ferrari	Ferrari
2023	Sandra Hüller	Hedwig Höss	The Zone of Interest
2023	Rachel McAdams	Barbara Simon	Are You There God? It's Me, Margaret.
2024
2024	Margaret Qualley	Sue	The Substance
2024	Joan Chen	Chungsing Wang	Dìdi
2024	Danielle Deadwyler	Berniece	The Piano Lesson
2024	Ariana Grande	Galinda "Glinda" Upland	Wicked
2024	Isabella Rossellini	Sister Agnes	Conclave

== SFCS Award for Best Ensemble Cast ==
Year	Film
2016
2016	Moonlight
2016	Captain Fantastic
2016	Fences
2016	Hell or High Water
2016	Manchester by the Sea
2017
2017	Get Out
2017	Call Me by Your Name
2017	Lady Bird
2017	The Post
2017	Three Billboards Outside Ebbing, Missouri
2018
2018	Widows
2018	Black Panther
2018	The Favourite
2018	If Beale Street Could Talk
2018	Vice
2019
2019	Parasite
2019	The Irishman
2019	Knives Out
2019	Little Women
2019	Once Upon a Time in Hollywood
2020
2020	Da 5 Bloods
2020	Judas and the Black Messiah
2020	Ma Rainey's Black Bottom
2020	Minari
2020	One Night in Miami...
2021
2021	Mass
2021	Dune
2021	In the Heights
2021	Licorice Pizza
2021	The Power of the Dog
2022
2022	Glass Onion: A Knives Out Mystery
2022	The Banshees of Inisherin
2022	Everything Everywhere All At Once
2022	Top Gun: Maverick
2022	Women Talking
2023
2023	The Holdovers
2023	Asteroid City
2023	Barbie
2023	Killers of the Flower Moon
2023	Oppenheimer
2024
2024	Anora
2024	Conclave
2024	Dune: Part Two
2024	His Three Daughters
2024	Sing Sing

== SFCS Award for Best Action Choreography ==
Year	Film
2019
2019	John Wick: Chapter 3 – Parabellum
2019	1917
2019	Avengers: Endgame
2019	Ford v Ferrari
2019	Shadow
2020
2020	Tenet
2020	Birds of Prey
2020	Extraction
2020	The Invisible Man
2020	Monster Hunter
2021
2021	In the Heights
2021	No Time to Die
2021	Nobody
2021	Raging Fire
2021	Shang-Chi and the Legend of the Ten Rings
2022
2022	RRR
2022	Avatar: The Way of Water
2022	Everything Everywhere All At Once
2022	The Northman
2022	Top Gun: Maverick
2023
2023	John Wick: Chapter 4
2023	Godzilla Minus One
2023	The Iron Claw
2023	Mission: Impossible – Dead Reckoning Part One
2023	Sisu
2024
2024	Furiosa: A Mad Max Saga
2024	Dune: Part Two
2024	Kingdom of the Planet of the Apes
2024	The Substance
2024	Wicked

== SFCS Award for Best Screenplay ==
Year	Film	Nominee(s)
2016
2016	Moonlight	Barry Jenkins and Tarell Alvin McCraney
2016	Arrival	Eric Heisserer
2016	Hell or High Water	Taylor Sheridan
2016	La La Land	Damien Chazelle
2016	Manchester by the Sea	Kenneth Lonergan
2017
2017	Lady Bird	Greta Gerwig
2017	The Big Sick	Emily V. Gordon and Kumail Nanjiani
2017	The Disaster Artist	Scott Neustadter and Michael H. Weber
2017	Get Out	Jordan Peele
2017	Three Billboards Outside Ebbing, Missouri	Martin McDonagh
2018
2018	The Favourite	Deborah Davis and Tony McNamara
2018	Blindspotting	Rafael Casal and Daveed Diggs
2018	First Reformed	Paul Schrader
2018	If Beale Street Could Talk	Barry Jenkins
2018	Roma	Alfonso Cuarón
2019
2019	Parasite	Bong Joon-ho and Han Jin-won
2019	The Farewell	Lulu Wang
2019	The Irishman	Steven Zaillian
2019	Knives Out	Rian Johnson
2019	Marriage Story	Noah Baumbach
2020
2020	Promising Young Woman	Emerald Fennell
2020	First Cow	Jonathan Raymond and Kelly Reichardt
2020	I'm Thinking of Ending Things	Charlie Kaufman
2020	Nomadland	Chloé Zhao
2020	Palm Springs	Andy Siara
2021
2021	Drive My Car	Ryûsuke Hamaguchi & Takamasa Oe
2021	The Green Knight	David Lowery
2021	Mass	Fran Kranz
2021	Pig	Michael Sarnoski
2021	The Power of the Dog	Jane Campion
2022
2022	The Banshees of Inisherin	Martin McDonagh
2022	Decision to Leave	Park Chan-wook & Chung Seo-kyung
2022	Everything Everywhere All At Once	Daniel Kwan & Daniel Scheinert
2022	Glass Onion: A Knives Out Mystery	Rian Johnson
2022	TÁR	Todd Field
2023
2023	The Holdovers	David Hemingson
2023	American Fiction	Cord Jefferson
2023	May December	Samy Burch
2023	Past Lives	Celine Song
2023	Poor Things	Tony McNamara
2024
2024	Anora	Sean Baker
2024	The Brutalist	Brady Corbet & Mona Fastvold
2024	Conclave	Peter Straughan
2024	A Real Pain	Jesse Eisenberg
2024	The Substance	Coralie Fargeat

== SFCS Award for Best Animated Feature ==
Year	Film	Nominee(s)
2016
2016	Zootopia	Byron Howard, Rich Moore, and Jared Bush
2016	Finding Dory	Andrew Stanton and Angus MacLane
2016	Kubo and the Two Strings	Travis Knight
2016	Moana	Ron Clements and John Musker
2016	Tower	Keith Maitland
2017
2017	Coco	Lee Unkrich and Adrian Molina
2017	The Breadwinner	Nora Twomey
2017	The Lego Batman Movie	Chris McKay
2017	Loving Vincent	Dorota Kobiela and Hugh Welchman
2017	Your Name	Makoto Shinkai
2018
2018	Spider-Man: Into the Spider-Verse	Bob Persichetti, Peter Ramsey, and Rodney Rothman
2018	Incredibles 2	Brad Bird
2018	Isle of Dogs	Wes Anderson
2018	Mirai	Mamoru Hosoda
2018	Ralph Breaks the Internet	Rich Moore and Phil Johnston
2019
2019	Toy Story 4	Josh Cooley
2019	Frozen II	Chris Buck and Jennifer Lee
2019	How to Train Your Dragon: The Hidden World	Dean DeBlois
2019	I Lost My Body	Jérémy Clapin
2019	Missing Link	Chris Butler
2020
2020	Wolfwalkers	Tomm Moore and Ross Stewart
2020	Onward	Dan Scanlon
2020	Over the Moon	Glen Keane and John Kahrs
2020	Ride Your Wave	Masaaki Yuasa
2020	Soul	Pete Docter and Kemp Powers
2021
2021	Flee	Jonas Poher Rasmussen
2021	Encanto	Jared Bush, Byron Howard, & Charise Castro Smith
2021	Luca	Enrico Casarosa
2021	The Mitchells vs. The Machines	Michael Rianda & Jeff Rowe
2021	Raya and the Last Dragon	Don Hall, Carlos López Estrada, Paul Briggs, & John Ripa
2022
2022	Marcel the Shell With Shoes On	Dean Fleischer Camp
2022	Guillermo del Toro’s Pinocchio	Guillermo del Toro & Mark Gustafson
2022	Mad God	Phil Tippett
2022	Puss in Boots: The Last Wish	Joel Crawford & Januel Mercado
2022	Turning Red	Domee Shi
2023
2023	Spider-Man: Across the Spider-Verse	Joaquim Dos Santos, Kemp Powers, & Justin K. Thompson
2023	The Boy and the Heron	Hayao Miyazaki
2023	Nimona	Nick Bruno & Troy Quane
2023	Suzume	Makoto Shinkai
2023	Teenage Mutant Ninja Turtles: Mutant Mayhem	Jeff Rowe
2024
2024	The Wild Robot	Chris Sanders
2024	Flow	Gints Zilbalodis
2024	Inside Out 2	Kelsey Mann
2024	Transformers One	Josh Cooley
2024	Wallace & Gromit: Vengeance Most Fowl	Merlin Crossingham & Nick Park

== SFCS Award for Best Documentary Feature ==
Year	Film	Nominee(s)
2016
2016	O.J.: Made in America	Ezra Edelman
2016	13th	Ava DuVernay
2016	Cameraperson	Kirsten Johnson
2016	Tickled	David Farrier and Dylan Reeve
2016	Weiner	Josh Kriegman and Elyse Steinberg
2017
2017	Faces Places	Agnès Varda and JR
2017	City of Ghosts	Matthew Heineman
2017	Ex Libris: The New York Public Library	Frederick Wiseman
2017	LA 92	Daniel Lindsay and T. J. Martin
2017	Step	Amanda Lipitz
2018
2018	Free Solo	Elizabeth Chai Vasarhelyi and Jimmy Chin
2018	Minding the Gap	Bing Liu
2018	Shirkers	Sandi Tan
2018	Three Identical Strangers	Tim Wardle
2018	Won't You Be My Neighbor?	Morgan Neville
2019
2019	Apollo 11	Todd Douglas Miller
2019	American Factory	Steven Bognar and Julia Reichert
2019	For Sama	Waad Al-Kateab and Edward Watts
2019	Fyre	Chris Smith
2019	Honeyland	Ljubomir Stefanov and Tamara Kotevska
2020
2020	The History of the Seattle Mariners: Supercut Edition	Jon Bois
2020	Boys State	Amanda McBaine and Jesse Moss
2020	Collective	Alexander Nanau
2020	Dick Johnson Is Dead	Kirsten Johnson
2020	Time	Garrett Bradley
2021
2021	Flee	Jonas Poher Rasmussen
2021	Billie Eilish: The World’s a Little Blurry	R.J. Cutler
2021	The Rescue	Jimmy Chin & Elizabeth Chai Vasarhelyi
2021	Summer of Soul (...Or, When the Revolution Could Not Be Televised)	Ahmir “Questlove” Thompson
2021	Woodlands Dark and Days Bewitched: A History of Folk Horror	Kier-La Janisse
2022
2022	Fire of Love	Sara Dosa
2022	All the Beauty and the Bloodshed	Laura Poitras
2022	Good Night Oppy	Ryan White
2022	Navalny	Daniel Roher
2022	Sweetheart Deal	Elisa Levine & Gabriel Miller
2023
2023	20 Days in Mariupol	Mstyslav Chernov
2023	Beyond Utopia	Madeleine Gavin
2023	Even Hell Has Its Heroes	Clyde Petersen
2023	Menus-Plaisirs — Les Troisgros	Frederick Wiseman
2023	Still: a Michael J. Fox Movie	Davis Guggenheim
2024
2024	No Other Land	Basel Adra, Hamdan Ballal, Yuval Abraham, & Rachel Szor
2024	Dahomey	Mati Diop
2024	Sugarcane	Julian Brave NoiseCat & Emily Kassie
2024	Super/Man: The Christopher Reeve Story	Ian Bonhôte & Peter Ettedgui
2024	Will & Harper	Josh Greenbaum

== SFCS Award for Best Foreign Language Film/Film Not in the English Language/International Film ==
Year	Film	Nominee(s)
2016
2016	Elle	Paul Verhoeven
2016	The Handmaiden	Park Chan-wook
2016	The Innocents	Anne Fontaine
2016	Under the Shadow	Babak Anvari
2016	The Wailing	Na Hong-jin
2017
2017	Raw	Julia Ducournau
2017	Blade of the Immortal	Takashi Miike
2017	BPM (Beats per Minute)	Robin Campillo
2017	Frantz	François Ozon
2017	Thelma	Joachim Trier
2018
2018	Roma	Alfonso Cuarón
2018	Burning	Lee Chang-dong
2018	Cold War	Paweł Pawlikowski
2018	Revenge	Coralie Fargeat
2018	Shoplifters	Hirokazu Kore-eda
2019
2019	Parasite	Bong Joon-ho
2019	The Farewell	Lulu Wang
2019	Monos	Alejandro Landes
2019	Pain and Glory	Pedro Almodóvar
2019	Portrait of a Lady on Fire	Céline Sciamma
2020
2020	Minari	Lee Isaac Chung
2020	Another Round	Thomas Vinterberg
2020	Bacurau	Juliano Dornelles and Kleber Mendonça Filho
2020	La Llorona	Jayro Bustamante
2020	To the Ends of the Earth	Kiyoshi Kurosawa
2021
2021	Drive My Car	Ryûsuke Hamaguchi
2021	Flee	Jonas Poher Rasmussen
2021	The Hand of God	Paolo Sorrentino
2021	Titane	Julia Ducournau
2021	The Worst Person in the World	Joachim Trier
2022
2022	Decision to Leave	Park Chan-wook
2022	All Quiet on the Western Front	Edward Berger
2022	EO	Jerzy Skolimowski
2022	RRR	S.S. Rajamouli
2022	Saint Omer	Alice Diop
2023
2023	Godzilla Minus One	Takashi Yamazaki
2023	Anatomy of a Fall	Justine Triet
2023	The Boy and the Heron	Hayao Miyazaki
2023	Monster	Hirokazu Kore-eda
2023	The Zone of Interest	Jonathan Glazer
2024
2024	Evil Does Not Exist	Ryûsuke Hamaguchi
2024	The Beast	Bertrand Bonello
2024	Flow	Gints Zilbalodis
2024	Red Rooms	Pascal Plante
2024	The Seed of the Sacred Fig	Mohammad Rasoulof

== SFCS Award for Best Cinematography ==
Year	Film	Nominee
2016
2016	Arrival	Bradford Young
2016	Jackie	Stéphane Fontaine
2016	La La Land	Linus Sandgren
2016	Moonlight	James Laxton
2016	The Witch	Jarin Blaschke
2017
2017	Blade Runner 2049	Roger Deakins
2017	Columbus	Elisha Christian
2017	Dunkirk	Hoyte van Hoytema
2017	The Florida Project	Alexis Zabé
2017	The Shape of Water	Dan Laustsen
2018
2018	Roma	Alfonso Cuarón
2018	The Favourite	Robbie Ryan
2018	If Beale Street Could Talk	James Laxton
2018	Mission: Impossible – Fallout	Rob Hardy
2018	The Rider	Joshua James Richards
2019
2019	1917	Roger Deakins
2019	The Lighthouse	Jarin Blaschke
2019	Once Upon a Time in Hollywood	Robert Richardson
2019	Parasite	Hong Kyung-pyo
2019	Portrait of a Lady on Fire	Claire Mathon
2020
2020	Nomadland	Joshua James Richards
2020	First Cow	Christopher Blauvelt
2020	Lovers Rock	Shabier Kirchner
2020	Mank	Erik Messerschmidt
2020	News of the World	Dariusz Wolski
2021
2021	The Green Knight	Andrew Droz Palermo
2021	Dune	Greig Fraser
2021	The Power of the Dog	Ari Wegner
2021	The Tragedy of Macbeth	Bruno Delbonnel
2021	West Side Story	Janusz Kaminski
2022
2022	Top Gun: Maverick	Claudio Miranda
2022	Avatar: The Way of Water	Russell Carpenter
2022	Decision to Leave	Kim Ji-yong
2022	Everything Everywhere All At Once	Larkin Seiple
2022	Nope	Hoyte van Hoytema
2023
2023	Poor Things	Robbie Ryan
2023	The Creator	Greig Fraser & Oren Soffer
2023	Killers of the Flower Moon	Rodrigo Prieto
2023	Oppenheimer	Hoyte van Hoytema
2023	The Zone of Interest	Łukasz Żal
2024
2024	Nickel Boys	Jomo Fray
2024	The Brutalist	Lol Crawley
2024	Dune: Part Two	Greig Fraser
2024	Furiosa: A Mad Max Saga	Simon Duggan
2024	Nosferatu	Jarin Blaschke

== SFCS Award for Best Costume Design ==
Year	Film	Nominee(s)
2016
2016	The Handmaiden	Cho Sang-kyung
2016	Jackie	Madeline Fontaine
2016	La La Land	Mary Zophres
2016	Love & Friendship	Eimer Ní Mhaoldomhnaigh
2016	The Witch	Linda Muir
2017
2017	Phantom Thread	Mark Bridges
2017	Beauty and the Beast	Jacqueline Durran
2017	Blade Runner 2049	Renée April
2017	Darkest Hour	Jacqueline Durran
2017	The Shape of Water	Luis Sequeira
2018
2018	Black Panther	Ruth E. Carter
2018	Colette	Andrea Flesch
2018	The Favourite	Sandy Powell
2018	Mary Poppins Returns	Sandy Powell
2018	Suspiria	Giulia Piersanti
2019
2019	Dolemite Is My Name	Ruth E. Carter
2019	Downton Abbey	Anna Mary Scott Robbins
2019	Little Women	Jacqueline Durran
2019	Once Upon a Time in Hollywood	Arianne Phillips
2019	Rocketman	Julian Day
2020
2020	Ma Rainey's Black Bottom	Ann Roth
2020	Birds of Prey	Erin Benach
2020	Emma	Alexandra Byrne
2020	First Cow	April Napier
2020	Mank	Trish Summerville
2021
2021	The Green Knight	Malgosia Turzanska
2021	Cruella	Jenny Beavan
2021	Dune	Jacqueline West & Robert Morgan
2021	House of Gucci	Janty Yates
2021	Spencer	Jacqueline Durran
2022
2022	Elvis	Catherine Martin
2022	Babylon	Mary Zophres
2022	Black Panther: Wakanda Forever	Ruth Carter
2022	Everything Everywhere All At Once	Shirley Kurata
2022	The Northman	Linda Muir
2023
2023	Barbie	Jacqueline Durran
2023	Killers of the Flower Moon	Jacqueline West
2023	Napoleon	Janty Yates & David Crossman
2023	Poor Things	Holly Waddington
2023	Priscilla	Stacey Battat
2024
2024	Wicked	Paul Tazewell
2024	Conclave	Lisy Christl
2024	Dune: Part Two	Jacqueline West
2024	Furiosa: A Mad Max Saga	Jenny Beavan
2024	Nosferatu	Linda Muir

== SFCS Award for Best Film Editing ==
Year	Film	Nominee(s)
2016
2016	Moonlight	Nat Sanders and Joi McMillon
2016	Arrival	Joe Walker
2016	Cameraperson	Nels Bangerter
2016	Hell or High Water	Jake Roberts
2016	La La Land	Tom Cross
2017
2017	Dunkirk	Lee Smith
2017	Baby Driver	Paul Machliss and Jonathan Amos
2017	Blade Runner 2049	Joe Walker
2017	Get Out	Gregory Plotkin
2017	Lady Bird	Nick Houy
2018
2018	Mission: Impossible – Fallout	Eddie Hamilton
2018	BlacKkKlansman	Barry Alexander Brown
2018	The Favourite	Yorgos Mavropsaridis
2018	First Man	Tom Cross
2018	Roma	Alfonso Cuarón and Adam Gough
2019
2019	Uncut Gems	Ronald Bronstein and Benny Safdie
2019	1917	Lee Smith
2019	The Irishman	Thelma Schoonmaker
2019	Once Upon a Time in Hollywood	Fred Raskin
2019	Parasite	Yang Jin-mo
2020
2020	Nomadland	Chloé Zhao
2020	Da 5 Bloods	Adam Gough
2020	Tenet	Jennifer Lame
2020	Time	Gabriel Rhodes
2020	The Trial of the Chicago 7	Alan Baumgarten
2021
2021	Dune	Joe Walker
2021	Drive My Car	Azusa Yamazaki
2021	The Power of the Dog	Peter Sciberras
2021	Titane	Jean-Christophe Bouzy
2021	West Side Story	Michael Kahn & Sarah Broshar
2022
2022	Everything Everywhere All At Once	Paul Rogers
2022	Aftersun	Blair McClendon
2022	Decision to Leave	Kim Sang-beom
2022	TÁR	Monika Willi
2022	Top Gun: Maverick	Eddie Hamilton
2023
2023	Oppenheimer	Jennifer Lame
2023	Killers of the Flower Moon	Thelma Schoonmaker
2023	Past Lives	Keith Fraase
2023	Poor Things	Yorgos Mavropsaridis
2023	Spider-Man: Across the Spider-Verse	Michael Andrews
2024
2024	Furiosa: A Mad Max Saga	Eliot Knapman & Margaret Sixel
2024	Anora	Sean Baker
2024	The Brutalist	Dávid Jancsó
2024	Dune: Part Two	Joe Walker
2024	The Substance	Coralie Fargeat, Jérôme Eltabet, & Valentin Feron

== SFCS Award for Best Original Score ==
Year	Film	Nominee(s)
2016
2016	Arrival	Jóhann Jóhannsson
2016	Jackie	Mica Levi
2016	La La Land	Justin Hurwitz
2016	Moonlight	Nicholas Britell
2016	Swiss Army Man	Andy Hull and Robert McDowell
2017
2017	Phantom Thread	Jonny Greenwood
2017	Blade Runner 2049	Benjamin Wallfisch and Hans Zimmer
2017	Dunkirk	Hans Zimmer
2017	War for the Planet of the Apes	Michael Giacchino
2017	Wonderstruck	Carter Burwell
2018
2018	Mandy	Jóhann Jóhannsson
2018	First Man	Justin Hurwitz
2018	If Beale Street Could Talk	Nicholas Britell
2018	Mission: Impossible – Fallout	Lorne Balfe
2018	You Were Never Really Here	Jonny Greenwood
2019
2019	Uncut Gems	Oneohtrix Point Never
2019	1917	Thomas Newman
2019	Joker	Hildur Guðnadóttir
2019	The Last Black Man in San Francisco	Emile Mosseri
2019	Us	Michael Abels
2020
2020	Soul	Jon Batiste, Trent Reznor, and Atticus Ross
2020	Da 5 Bloods	Terence Blanchard
2020	Mank	Trent Reznor and Atticus Ross
2020	Minari	Emile Mosseri
2020	Tenet	Ludwig Göransson
2021
2021	Dune	Hans Zimmer
2021	The French Dispatch	Alexandre Desplat
2021	The Green Knight	Daniel Hart
2021	The Power of the Dog	Jonny Greenwood
2021	Spencer (film)	Jonny Greenwood
2022
2022	Babylon	Justin Hurwitz
2022	The Banshees of Inisherin	Carter Burwell
2022	The Batman	Michael Giacchino
2022	The Fabelmans	John Williams
2022	Nope	Michael Abels
2023
2023	Oppenheimer	Ludwig Göransson
2023	Killers of the Flower Moon	Robbie Robertson
2023	Poor Things	Jerskin Fendrix
2023	Spider-Man: Across the Spider-Verse	Daniel Pemberton
2023	The Zone of Interest	Mica Levi
2024
2024	Challengers	Trent Reznor and Atticus Ross
2024	The Brutalist	Daniel Blumberg
2024	Conclave	Volker Bertelmann
2024	Evil Does Not Exist	Eiko Ishibashi
2024	The Wild Robot	Kris Bowers

== SFCS Award for Best Production Design ==
Year	Film	Production Designer(s)	Set Decorator(s)
2016
2016	The Handmaiden	Ryu Seong-hee	–
2016	Arrival	Patrice Vermette	Paul Hotte
2016	Jackie	Jean Rabasse	Véronique Melery
2016	La La Land	David Wasco	Sandy Reynolds-Wasco
2016	Rogue One: A Star Wars Story	Doug Chiang and Neil Lamont	Lee Sandales
2017
2017	Blade Runner 2049	Dennis Gassner	Alessandra Querzola
2017	Dunkirk	Nathan Crowley	Gary Fettis
2017	Murder on the Orient Express	Jim Clay	Rebecca Alleway
2017	Phantom Thread	Mark Tildesley	Véronique Melery
2017	The Shape of Water	Paul Denham Austerberry	Shane Vieau and Jeff Melvin
2018
2018	The Favourite	Fiona Crombie	Alice Felton
2018	Black Panther	Hannah Beachler	Jay Hart
2018	First Man	Nathan Crowley	Kathy Lucas
2018	Mary Poppins Returns	John Myhre	Gordon Sim
2018	Roma	Eugenio Caballero	Bárbara Enríquez
2019
2019	Once Upon a Time in Hollywood	Barbara Ling	Nancy Haigh
2019	1917	Dennis Gassner	Lee Sandales
2019	The Irishman	Bob Shaw	Regina Graves
2019	Little Women	Jess Gonchor	Claire Kaufman
2019	Parasite	Lee Ha-jun	–
2020
2020	Mank	Donald Graham Burt	Jan Pascale
2020	First Cow	Anthony Gasparro	Vanessa Knoll
2020	Judas and the Black Messiah	Sam Lisenco	Rebecca Brown
2020	News of the World	David Crank	Elizabeth Keenan
2020	Tenet	Nathan Crowley	Kathy Lucas
2021
2021	The Green Knight	Jade Healy	Jenny Oman
2021	Dune	Patrice Vermette	Zsuzsanna Sipos
2021	The French Dispatch	Adam Stockhausen	Rena DeAngelo
2021	Nightmare Alley	Tamara Deverell	Shane Vieau
2021	West Side Story	Adam Stockhausen	Rena DeAngelo
2022
2022	Babylon	Florencia Martin	Anthony Carlino
2022	Elvis	Catherine Martin & Karen Murphy	Bev Dunn
2022	Everything Everywhere All At Once	Jason Kisvarday	Kelsi Ephraim
2022	The Northman	Craig Lathrop	Niamh Coulter
2022	White Noise	Jess Gonchor	Claire Kaufman
2023
2023	Barbie	Sarah Greenwood	Katie Spencer
2023	Killers of the Flower Moon	Jack Fisk	–
2023	Oppenheimer	Ruth De Jong	Claire Kaufman
2023	Poor Things	Shona Heath & James Price	–
2023	Wonka	Nathan Crowley	Harry Bielanski
2024
2024	The Brutalist	Judy Becker	Patricia Cuccia
2024	Conclave	Suzie Davies	Cynthia Sleiter
2024	Dune: Part Two	Patrice Vermette	Shane Vieau
2024	Furiosa: A Mad Max Saga	Colin Gibson	Katie Sharrock
2024	Wicked	Nathan Crowley	Lee Sandales

== SFCS Award for Best Visual Effects ==
Year	Film	Nominee(s)
2016
2016	Arrival (TIE)	Louis Morin
2016	Doctor Strange (TIE)	Stephane Ceretti, Paul Corbould, Richard Bluff, and Vincent Cirelli
2016	Captain America: Civil War	Dan DeLeeuw, Dan Sudick, Russell Earl, and Greg Steele
2016	The Jungle Book	Robert Legato, Andrew R. Jones, Adam Valdez, and Dan Lemmon
2016	Rogue One: A Star Wars Story	John Knoll, Mohen Leo, Hal Hickel, and Neil Corbould
2017
2017	War for the Planet of the Apes	Joe Letteri, Dan Lemmon, Daniel Barrett, and Joel Whist
2017	Blade Runner 2049	John Nelson, Paul Lambert, Richard R. Hoover, and Gerd Nefzer
2017	Dunkirk	Andrew Jackson, Andrew Lockley, Scott R. Fisher, and Paul Corbould
2017	The Shape of Water	Dennis Berardi, Luke Groves, Trey Harrell, and Kevin Scott
2017	Valerian and the City of a Thousand Planets	Scott Stokdyk and Jérome Lionard
2018
2018	Mission: Impossible – Fallout	Jody Johnson
2018	Annihilation	Andrew Whitehurst, Sara Bennett, Richard Clarke, and Simon Hughes
2018	Avengers: Infinity War	Dan DeLeeuw, Kelly Port, Russell Earl, and Dan Sudick
2018	Black Panther	Geoffrey Baumann, Jesse James Chisholm, Craig Hammack, and Dan Sudick
2018	First Man	Paul Lambert, J. D. Schwalm, Ian Hunter, and Tristan Myles
2019
2019	Ad Astra	Allen Maris, Jedediah Smith, Guillaume Rocheron, and Scott R. Fisher
2019	1917	Guillaume Rocheron, Greg Butler, and Dominic Tuohy
2019	Alita: Battle Angel	Nick Epstein, Joe Letteri, and Eric Saindon
2019	Avengers: Endgame	Dan DeLeeuw, Matt Aitken, Russell Earl, and Dan Sudick
2019	The Irishman	Pablo Helman, Leandro Estebecorena, Stephane Grabil, and Nelson Sepulveda
2020
2020	Tenet	Mike Chambers, Scott R. Fisher, Andrew Jackson, and Andrew Lockley
2020	Greyhound	Peter Bebb, Nathan McGuinness, Whitney Richman, and Sebastian Theo von Overheidt
2020	The Invisible Man	Aevar Bjarnason, Marcus Bolton, Jonathan Dearing, and Matt Ebb
2020	The Midnight Sky	Matt Kasmir, Chris Lawrence, Max Solomon, and David Watkins
2020	Possessor	Murray Barber, Bryan Jones, and Derek Liscoumb
2021
2021	Dune	Paul Lambert, Tristan Myles, Brian Connor, and Gerd Nefzer
2021	The Green Knight	Eric Saindon and Michael Cozens
2021	The Matrix Resurrections	Dan Glass, Huw J. Evans, Tom Debenham, and J. D. Schwalm
2021	Shang-Chi and the Legend of the Ten Rings	Christopher Townsend, Joe Farrell, Sean Walker, and Dan Oliver
2021	Spider-Man: No Way Home	Kelly Port, Chris Waegner, Scott Edelstein, and Dan Sudick
2022
2022	Avatar: The Way of Water	Joe Letteri, Richard Baneham, Eric Saindon, and Daniel Barrett
2022	Everything Everywhere All At Once	Zak Stoltz, Ethan Feldbau, Benjamin Brewer, and Jeff Desom
2022	Nope	Guillaume Rocheron, Jeremy Robert, Sreejith Venugopalan, and Scott R. Fisher
2022	RRR	Srinivas Mohan, Pete Draper, and Daniel French
2022	Top Gun: Maverick	Ryan Tudhope, Scott R. Fisher, Seth Hill, and Bryan Litson
2023
2023	Godzilla Minus One	Takashi Yamazaki
2023	The Creator	Jay Cooper, Ian Comley, Andrew Roberts, and Neil Corbould
2023	Guardians of the Galaxy Vol. 3	Stephane Ceretti, Alexis Wajsbrot, Guy Williams, and Theo Bialek
2023	Oppenheimer	Andrew Jackson, Giacomo Mineo, Scott Fisher, and Dave Drzewiecki
2023	Poor Things	Simon Hughes
2024
2024	Dune: Part Two	Paul Lambert, Stephen James, and Rhys Salcombe
2024	Furiosa: A Mad Max Saga	Andrew Jackson and Dan Bethell
2024	Kingdom of the Planet of the Apes	Erik Winquist and Sean Noel Walker
2024	The Substance	Bryan Jones, Guillaume Le Gouez, Chervin Shafaghi, Pierre Olivier-Persin, and Jean Miel
2024	Wicked	Anthony Smith, Jonathan Fawkner, Pablo Helman, and Robert Weaver

== SFCS Award for Best Youth Performance ==
Year	Performer	Role	Film
2016
2016	Anya Taylor-Joy	Thomasin	The Witch
2016	Alex Hibbert	Child Chiron / "Little"	Moonlight
2016	Royalty Hightower	Toni	The Fits
2016	Sunny Pawar	Saroo Brierley	Lion
2016	Harvey Scrimshaw	Caleb	The Witch
2017
2017	Brooklynn Prince	Moonee	The Florida Project
2017	Dafne Keen	Laura Kinney / X-23	Logan
2017	Sophia Lillis	Beverly Marsh	It
2017	Millicent Simmonds	Rose	Wonderstruck
2017	Jacob Tremblay	August "Auggie" Pullman	Wonder
2018
2018	Elsie Fisher	Kayla Day	Eighth Grade
2018	Kairi Jō	Shota Shibata	Shoplifters
2018	Thomasin McKenzie	Tom	Leave No Trace
2018	Milly Shapiro	Charlie Graham	Hereditary
2018	Millicent Simmonds	Regan Abbott	A Quiet Place
2019
2019	Thomasin McKenzie	Elsa Korr	Jojo Rabbit
2019	Julia Butters	Trudi Frazer	Once Upon a Time in Hollywood
2019	Kyliegh Curran	Abra Stone	Doctor Sleep
2019	Roman Griffin Davis	Johannes "Jojo Rabbit" Betzler	Jojo Rabbit
2019	Noah Jupe	Otis Lort	Honey Boy
2020
2020	Alan Kim	David Yi	Minari
2020	Millie Bobby Brown	Enola Holmes	Enola Holmes
2020	Ji-hu Park	Eun-hee	House of Hummingbird
2020	Talia Ryder	Skylar	Never Rarely Sometimes Always
2020	Helena Zengel	Johanna Leonberger / Cicada	News of the World
2021
2021	Emilia Jones	Ruby Rossi	CODA
2021	Jude Hill	Buddy	Belfast
2021	Cooper Hoffman	Gary Valentine	Licorice Pizza
2021	Woody Norman	Jesse	C'mon C'mon
2021	Joséphine Sanz	Nelly	Petite Maman
2022
2022	Frankie Corio	Sophie	Aftersun
2022	Vanessa Burghardt	Lola	Cha Cha Real Smooth
2022	Anna Cobb	Casey	We're All Going to the World's Fair
2022	Eden Dambrine	Léo	Close
2022	Banks Repeta	Paul Graff	Armageddon Time
2023
2023	Milo Machado-Graner	Daniel Maleski	Anatomy of a Fall
2023	Amie Donald	M3GAN	M3GAN
2023	Abby Ryder Fortson	Margaret Simon	Are You There God? It's Me, Margaret.
2023	Ariana Greenblatt	Sasha	Barbie
2023	Sōya Kurokawa	Minato Mugino	Monster
2024
2024	Izaac Wang	Chris "Dìdi" Wang	Dìdi
2024	Alyla Browne	Young Furiosa	Furiosa: A Mad Max Saga
2024	Katherine Mallen Kupferer	Daisy Mueller	Ghostlight
2024	Alisha Weir	Abigail	Abigail
2024	Zoe Ziegler	Lacy	Janet Planet

== SFCS Award for Villain of the Year ==
Year	Performer	Role(s)	Film
2016
2016	John Goodman	Howard Stambler	10 Cloverfield Lane
2016	Wahab Chaudhry and Charlie the goat	Black Phillip	The Witch
2016	Stephen Lang	Norman Nordstrom (a.k.a. "The Blind Man")	Don't Breathe
2016	Ben Mendelsohn	Orson Krennic	Rogue One: A Star Wars Story
2016	Patrick Stewart	Darcy Banker	Green Room
2017
2017	James McAvoy	Dennis and various multiple personalities	Split
2017	Barry Keoghan	Martin Lang	The Killing of a Sacred Deer
2017	Will Poulter	Philip Krauss	Detroit
2017	Michael Shannon	Richard Strickland	The Shape of Water
2017	Bill Skarsgård	Pennywise	It
2018
2018	Michael B. Jordan	Erik Killmonger	Black Panther
2018	Josh Brolin	Thanos	Avengers: Infinity War
2018	Hugh Grant	Phoenix Buchanan	Paddington 2
2018	Daniel Kaluuya	Jatemme Manning	Widows
2018	Simon Maiden	STEM	Upgrade
2019
2019	Red Dress	Red Dress	In Fabric
2019	Rebecca Ferguson	Rose the Hat	Doctor Sleep
2019	Lupita Nyong'o	Red	Us
2019	Joe Pesci	Russell Bufalino	The Irishman
2019	Joaquin Phoenix	Arthur Fleck / Joker	Joker
2020
2020	Oliver Jackson-Cohen	Adrian Griffin / The Invisible Man	The Invisible Man
2020	Udo Kier	Michael	Bacurau
2020	Frank Langella	Judge Julius Hoffman	The Trial of the Chicago 7
2020	Ewan McGregor	Roman Sionis / Black Mask	Birds of Prey
2020	Sarah Paulson	Diane Sherman	Run
2021
2021	Benedict Cumberbatch	Phil Burbank	The Power of the Dog
2021	Willem Dafoe	Norman Osborn	Spider-Man: No Way Home
2021	Idris Elba	Rufus Buck	The Harder They Fall
2021	Tony Leung	Xu Wenwu	Shang-Chi and the Legend of the Ten Rings
2021	Stellan Skarsgård	Baron Vladimir Harkonnen	Dune
2022
2022	Cate Blanchett	Lydia Tár	Tár
2022	Paul Dano	The Riddler / Edward Nashton	The Batman
2022	Mia Goth	Pearl	X and Pearl
2022	Stephanie Hsu	Jobu Tupaki	Everything Everywhere All At Once
2022	Jean Jacket	Jean Jacket	Nope
2023
2023	Godzilla	Godzilla	Godzilla Minus One
2023	Jenna Davis and Amie Donald	M3GAN	M3GAN
2023	Robert de Niro	William "King" Hale	Killers of the Flower Moon
2023	Mia Goth	Gabi Bauer	Infinity Pool
2023	The Kens	representation of the patriarchy	Barbie
2024
2024	Chris Hemsworth	Dementus	Furiosa: A Mad Max Saga
2024	Austin Butler	Feyd-Rautha Harkonnen	Dune: Part Two
2024	Nicolas Cage	Longlegs	Longlegs
2024	Bill Skarsgård	Count Orlok	Nosferatu
2024	Denzel Washington	Macrinus	Gladiator II
2025
2025	Weapons	Aunt Gladys	Amy Madigan
2025	Sean Penn	Col. Steven J. Lockjaw	One Battle After Another
2025	Sally Hawkins	Laura	Bring Her Back
2025	Nicholas Hoult	Lex Luthor	Superman
2025	Jack O'Connell	Remmick	Sinners

== Achievement in Pacific Northwest Filmmaking ==
Year	Film	Director(s)
2022
2022	Sweetheart Deal	Elisa Levine and Gabriel Miller
2022	All Sorts	J. Rick Castañeda
2022	Kimi	Steven Soderbergh
2022	Know Your Place	Zia Mohajerjasbi
2022	Sam Now	Reed Harkness
2023
2023	Showing Up	Kelly Reichardt
2023	Fantasy A Gets a Mattress	David Norman Lewis and Noah Zoltan Sofian
2023	Richland	Irene Lusztig
2023	Dreamin' Wild	Bill Pohlad
2023	Even Hell Has Its Heroes	Clyde Petersen
2024
2024	Rainier: A Beer Odyssey	Isaac Olsen
2024	All We Carry	Cady Voge
2024	Fish War	Jeff Ostenson, Charles Atkinson, & Skylar Wagner
2024	Gasoline Rainbow	Bill Ross IV & Turner Ross
2024	Strange Darling	J. T. Mollner
