= Beacon 23 =

American science fiction psychological thriller television series

- Genre: Science fiction; Psychological thriller; Serial drama
- Created by: Zak Penn
- Based on: Beacon 23 by Hugh Howey
- Starring: Lena Headey; Stephan James; Marnie McPhail; Daniel Malik; Carolina Bartczak; Ellen Wong; Cyrus Faird; Sydney Ozerov-Meyer; Hannah Melissa Scott; Tara Rosling
- Theme music composer: Ramin Djawadi
- Composer: William Marriott
- Country of origin: United States
- Original language: English
- No. of seasons: 2
- No. of episodes: 16

Production
- Executive producers: Zak Penn; Ira Steven Behr; Tina Thor; Katie O'Connell; Elisa Ellis; Lena Headey; Stephan James; Glen Mazzara; Joy Blake; Katherine Pope
- Producers: Manny Danelon; Lewin Webb
- Production location: Toronto
- Cinematography: Steve Lawes; Cynthia Pusheck; Cybel Martin
- Running time: 44–49 minutes
- Production companies: Peephole Productions (season 2); Platform One Media (season 2); Boat Rocker Media; Spectrum Originals (season 2); Studio 8 Television (season 2); MGM+ Studios

Original release
- Network: MGM+
- Release: November 12, 2023 – May 26, 2024

Beacon 23 is an American science fiction psychological thriller television series created by Zak Penn, based on a series of short stories of the same name by Hugh Howey. It stars Lena Headey and Stephan James, and is a co-production between Spectrum and Boat Rocker Media. Although originally greenlit by Spectrum Originals and AMC Networks, it premiered on MGM+ on November 12, 2023, in the United States. The second season premiered on April 7, 2024.

Set in the 23rd century, the series takes place on a remote "lighthouse" in space.

In September 2024, the series was cancelled after two seasons.

== Premise ==
Beacon 23 follows Aster and Halan, two people whose fates become entangled after they find themselves trapped together at the end of the known universe. Aster mysteriously finds her way to a lonely beacon keeper, on his lighthouse in the darkest recesses of space. A tense battle of wills unfolds as Halan begins to wonder if Aster is friend or foe as her ability to disguise her agenda and motives could make her a formidable opponent.

== Cast and characters ==
- Lena Headey as Aster Calyx
- Stephan James as Halan Kai Nelson
- Natasha Mumba as Harmony
- Wade Bogert-O'Brien as Bart
- Stephen Root as Solomon
- Barbara Hershey as Sophie
- Eric Lange as Milan/Aleph
- Marc Menchaca as Keir
- Jess Salgueiro as Saldana
- Daniel Malik as Finch
- Marnie McPhail as Kanadey
- Carolina Bartczak as Dr. Ree Avalon
- Cyrus Faird as Tech Wrecker
- Tara Rosling as Randall
- Sandrine Holt as Coley
- A.J. Simmons as Farut, Parsim's father
- Sydney Meyer as Grisha, Parsim's mother
- Matilda Legault as Parsim
- Ellen Wong as Iris

== Episodes ==
=== Series overview ===
Season	Episodes	Originally released	
Season	Episodes	First released	Last released
1	8	November 12, 2023	December 17, 2023
2	8	April 7, 2024	May 26, 2024

=== Season 1 (2023) ===
No. overall	No. in season	Title	Directed by	Teleplay by	Original release date
1	1	"Corbenic"	Daniel Percival	Zak Penn and Allison Moore	November 12, 2023
Halan is the sole person running the Interstellar Space Authority's Beacon 23, a stellar lighthouse in deep space. An oncoming ship, the Crest, is destroyed by dark matter obstacles despite Halan's attempts to warn the crew; Aster is the sole survivor that Halan is able to bring on board. Aster has traveled there in response to reports sent from Beacon 23 about a mysterious mineral, and she quickly figures out that Halan is not the beacon's actual keeper, Solomon. Halan is an AWOL soldier who has PTSD-related hallucinations of his last, failed mission. Halan claims that Solomon stole his ship and left, but Bart, Beacon 23's computer, claims that Halan killed Solomon. Halan attempts to subdue Aster, but she turns the tables on him with the help of Harmony, her personal AI. Halan negotiates a deal where he'll help Aster find Solomon's rock samples, in return for being given a small cutter ship to leave the beacon. Aster finds the rocks, but refuses to let Halan leave. An unfamiliar ship arrives at Beacon 23 and docks without authorization.
2	2	"Wreckers"	Daniel Percival	Zak Penn	November 12, 2023
The new arrivals are a gang of Wreckers who were hired to loot the remains of the Crest, but were warned against taking Beacon 23. They hack Bart, who cannot reboot properly despite Harmony's efforts. Kennedy, one of the Wreckers, is also a former minister of a colony that collapsed after its beacon failed. Halan reluctantly teams up with Aster, who helps him charge up his cybernetic enhancements so he can fight the Wreckers. Halan learns that Aster does not work for the Interstellar Space Authority, but was hired by a company, QTA, who also hired the Wreckers. Aster makes a deal with Kennedy to give Halan passage off the beacon, but Halan decides to stay. The rocks cause Halan's PTSD hallucinations to worsen. Aster kills Battle, the Wreckers' leader, while Chick, the last Wrecker survivor, leaves on the Wreckers' ship.
3	3	"Why Can't We Go On as Three?"	Daniel Percival	Teleplay by : Ira Steven Behr; Story by : Ira Steven Behr & Richard Kahan	November 19, 2023
Aster shows Halan that under the microscope, the mineral's structure looks like the pendant she received from her mother. Harmony successfully revives Bart, who continues to insist that Halan killed Solomon, but Harmony classifies that death as an accident. Aster's colleague and lover, Coley, arrives at Beacon 23 to help Aster transport the rocks; she is suspicious of Halan, believing that he's also after the rocks. While waiting for safe conditions to leave, Aster tries to get Halan and Coley to bond, but Coley looks up Halan's file, which details how he abandoned his squad, in an attempt to drive a wedge between Aster and Halan. Aster is angered when she figures out that QTA had the Crest destroyed on purpose, risking her life, and that Coley knew that was the plan. Coley tries to kill Halan, but Aster kills Coley first.
4	4	"God In the Machine"	Erskine Forde	Matthew J. Wygodny	November 26, 2023
A hundred and eighty years earlier, powerful QTA industrialist Milan Aleph arrives at Beacon 23 incognito in order to get information on an Artifact that visited Beacon 23 and was observed by the beacon's previous, first keeper. Milan is searching for the means for immortality and the metaphysical advancement of humankind, which he believes can be found with the Artifact. Milan poisons the current keeper, but Bart revives her, and she debates Milan on his beliefs in the hope of changing his mind. Bart believes that Milan will cause a genocide in pursuit of immortality and, ignoring the keeper's protests, locks Milan in an airlock to suffocate him. Just before Milan dies, he activates a new AI in his likeness, Aleph. Aleph asks the keeper to work with him but she refuses, saying she can no longer trust any AI, including Bart.
5	5	"Rocky"	Oz Scott	Allison Moore and Dagny Atencio Looper	December 3, 2023
Aster has Harmony recover footage from Halan's last mission, which reveals that his squad encountered the same mineral and that Halan breathed it in. The mineral altered Halan's brain; Aster believes the mineral deliberately manipulated Halan into coming to Beacon 23, but Harmony argues that the mineral is merely a virus. Bart shows Aster and Harmony footage of Halan's arrival on Beacon 23 — Halan forced entry and took over despite Solomon's attempts to resist, and Solomon later tried to escape on Halan's ship, the Amboyna, not realizing that its oxygen supply was diminished. Halan hallucinates that one of rocks can talk to him; it, along with hallucinations of Harmony and Gashade, one his squad members, convince Halan to open the beacon's storage unit, releasing the rock samples into space. Halan and Aster watch the rocks move in an unnatural formation outside Beacon 23, forming the Artifact.
6	6	"Beacon Twenty Three"	Oz Scott	Zak Penn & Allison Moore	December 10, 2023
Column is a resistance group that protests space expansion at the cost of humanity, and whose tenets are founded on the relics they believe come from an alien civilization. Keir, a Column saboteur, is preparing to destroy Beacon 23, but is delayed long enough to be arrested when Bart tells him about the Artifact, the origin of the relics. The Artifact was first observed by Beacon 23's first keeper, Dr. Ree Avalon, who attempted to measure it despite no AI sensors being able to observe it. Avalon had increasingly vivid hallucinations, and mysteriously disappeared when approaching the Artifact during an EVA. Later, a pair of married Beacon 23 keepers, Farut and Grisha, and their illegal child who was born on the beacon, Parsim, all observed the Artifact. Parsim grew erratic the more she saw the Artifact, and Farut became obsessed with understanding the Artifact. Desperate, Grisha used the beacon's drones to crash into the Artifact, scattering the rocks and rendering them visible to Bart's sensors. The family flee Beacon 23 with new identities ― Parsim is Aster.
7	7	"End Transmission"	Greg Beeman	Richard Kahan	December 17, 2023
In flashback, Solomon arrives at Beacon 23 shortly after Keir is arrested, and he deletes Bart's memories to start anew. In present time, Aster and Halan take shifts to observe the restored Artifact's appearances, and Aster's memories of her childhood on Beacon 23 return to her. Keir returns to Beacon 23 hoping to learn more about the Artifact and Aster's connection to it. Keir brings with him fellow Column agents Finch and Saldana, who antagonize Aster, Halan and Bart. QTA attack ships make their way to the beacon. Halan, with Bart's help, leaves on a cutter to reach the Amboyna, which has returned to the beacon despite being out of fuel. Inside the Amboyna, Halan finds another rock and releases it to space, allowing it to return to the Artifact. Bart is enraged when he realizes that his earlier memories were permanently deleted by Solomon, and he commits suicide by self-destruct. Halan turns the Amboyna around to return to Beacon 23.
8	8	"Adamantine"	Tessa Blake	Zak Penn & Ira Steven Behr	December 17, 2023
Aster communes with the Artifact, which gives her visions of herself as a child, and later visions of her adult self and Halan inside the Artifact. Halan destroys the QTA ships and returns to the beacon to try to get Aster to leave, but she wants to go into the Artifact and invites Halan to join her. Aleph, the quantum AI in charge of QTA, arrives in a giant mothership; he had arranged Aster's mission in order to restore and gain knowledge about the Artifact. Saldana and Finch receive a message from the Column, instructing them to destroy Beacon 23 to kill Aleph, but they are stopped by Harmony and told to leave. Aster makes a deal with Aleph that she and Halan will enter the Artifact with the option to return in 24 hours, and they will give Aleph whatever data he wants. Keir, believing the Artifact's message is meant only for humans and not AI, shoots Aster. As Aster bleeds out, she has a vision of herself receiving the Artifact's message.

=== Season 2 (2024) ===
No. overall	No. in season	Title	Directed by	Written by	Original release date
9	1	"Godspeed"	Kevin Sullivan	Glen Mazzara	April 7, 2024
Aster is declared dead. Halan at first rejects Aleph's request that he fulfill Aster's deal by entering the Artifact, but he pretends to change his mind when Aleph threatens Halan's father. Halan works with Saldana, Keir and Finch to launch a sneak suicide attack on Aleph's mothership, with the bombs hidden with Aster's body. Halan launches the Amboyna, but instead of attacking the mothership, he sends Aster's body into the Artifact, causing the Artifact to explode. Aleph kills Saldana, Keir and Finch, removes Harmony, and leaves Halan alone on the damaged Beacon 23.
10	2	"Purgatory"	Lewin Webb	Sarah Nolen	April 14, 2024
While Halan becomes more and more desperate trying to find a way off the beacon, Harmony, back in the AI liminal space, faces QTA Internal Affairs – Mara, Randall and Dev – because of the events that transpired onboard the station. As they threaten deletion when she doesn't cooperate, she realizes she is still inside Beacon 23, having imprinted on Halan. She fights her way back to him.
11	3	"Iris"	Angel Kristi Williams	Michael Ouzas	April 21, 2024
Iris, the devoted keeper of Beacon 67, spends her life fulfilling her keeper duties, playing the clarinet, baking, and developing a semi-illicit relationship with beacon keeper 174. When she notices an anomaly about Beacon 23, she decides to go and investigate. She meets Halan and the ravaged Beacon 23, and after a difficult first encounter, helps him restore Harmony and the station. When she finds out B174 set out to join her, she and Halan witness his vessel struggling against a violent storm, before landing in the beacon. Harmony detects no signs of life.
12	4	"Berth"	Erskine Forde	Joy Blake	April 28, 2024
B174's vessel contains a foreign entity that starts spreading and disrupting the beacon's systems. Iris is struggling against Halan's secretive nature, but they manage to work together to get rid of the vessel and the entity. Harmony, still recuperating, is haunted by Dev, who wants to imprint on Iris. When it doesn't work, he decides to go for the new dweller of the beacon, an individual that was formerly encased in the foreign entity, still on board.
13	5	"Song of Sorrow"	Ayoka Chenzira	Glen Mazzara	May 5, 2024
Dev pursues his quest to imprint on one of Beacon 23's dwellers, which now counts scrap yard worker Dosto, the man who emerged from the fog-like entity. Dosto's planetary system Sybarra was ravaged by the military led by Aleph to destroy the last of the Column's holdouts. Iris surmises that he and his crew must have gone through a pocket universe — the fog — when they fled. Tensions rise when the team saves a group of people from the fog against Dosto's vehement refusal, only to realize he sold out his own people to Aleph, and murdered people along the way. The Sybarrans wants justice, and start stripping the beacon for parts to build a new vessel. Halan and Iris are knocked out.
14	6	"Luan Casca"	Lewin Webb	Mikayla Gingrey & Nate O'Mahoney	May 12, 2024
Years ago, on Beacon 90, keeper Jocko welcomes young trainee Aster. Although they get along well, both have hidden agendas: Aster is part of a group subverting the military, while Jocko keeps a man locked up, hidden in an airlock. Despite Jocko begging her not to, Aster frees the man, Cerran, who is not a victim but a ruthless soldier who agreed to be part of an experiment to be even more violent. Jocko tries to switch places with Aster to save her, but she refuses.
15	7	"Free"	Nick Copus	Christina Martin	May 19, 2024
Dev succeeds in imprinting on Dosto, who is being tortured by the Sybarrans, and saves his life. Two soldiers barge on the beacon and start savagely beating the dwellers. They were sent by Halan's father, Kadir, a high ranking officer in the military. Kadir claims that Halan's memories about his botched mission are false, and offers a surgical implant to find the truth. Dev leads Dosto to be slaughtered by the Sybarrans, so Harmony destroys him. Iris helps the Sybarrans leave on the military ship, but the soldiers cut off life support on board, leaving them to die. Despite Iris's protests, Halan agrees to the surgery, and meets with Aleph.
16	8	"Disintegration"	Lewin Webb	Joy Blake	May 26, 2024
Harmony realizes the surgery is not about the implant, but instead siphoning the Artifact's dust Halan had breathed in during his last mission. Halan finds himself locked in a dimension with Aleph, Bart and Harmony. When Harmony jettisons the piece of Artifact Halan has kept hidden, the Artifact comes back to life, and Aster appears in the dimension. Back in the real world, Iris succeeds in restoring power for the Sybarrans, who can finally leave. Xalterrica stays behind to help Iris in gratitude, but Halan dies in the meantime. Harmony understands she's the driving force behind the dimension and finds a way out with everybody's help, becoming a true AI/human synthesis. The Artifact communicates with her directly, and deems her worthy to receive "them".

== Production ==
=== Development ===
Initial development of the series was announced in 2018. In March 2021, Lena Headey was named as the series lead, and in September 2021, Stephan James was named as the co-star. Prior to its initial broadcast, it was announced that the series would be picked up for a second season. It was also reported that season one and two would film back-to-back and that Glen Mazzara and Joy Blake would take over as co-showrunners after season one because of scheduling issues for Zak Penn. In September 2024, MGM+ cancelled the series after two seasons.

=== Filming ===
Principal photography was initially scheduled to begin in Toronto in 2021. After a series of delays, it finally began on April 19, 2022. The pilot episode was directed by Daniel Percival. Production on the first season finished in November 2022, but the series stayed in production concurrent with the filming of the second season. On July 2, 2023, the author of the adaptation's source material, Hugh Howey, confirmed that two seasons had been filmed and were in post-production.

== Reception ==
The review aggregator website Rotten Tomatoes reported a 55% approval rating with an average rating of 5.5/10, based on 11 critic reviews. The website's critical consensus reads, "Beacon 23 is full of clever world-building flourishes while light on character depth, making for an uneven saga full of invention but lacking in inspiration."
