= Harvey Scrimshaw =

English actor (born 2001)

- Born: Harvey Randall Scrimshaw; 17 November 2001 (age 24); Nottingham, England
- Other name: Scrimbo
- Occupation: Actor
- Years active: 2010–present

Harvey Scrimshaw is an English actor. He is best known for playing Caleb in the horror film The Witch.

== Early life ==
Scrimshaw was born in Nottingham, England.

== Career ==
Scrimshaw was exposed to a larger audience when he was cast as Caleb in the horror film The Witch. His performance was praised by critics. His second biggest role was when he played Harvid in The School for Good and Evil. Since then he has played Lee McKeller in three episodes of the psychological drama Without Sin. He is currently scheduled to play a lead role in a war drama called Shoulders.

== Filmography ==
=== Film ===
Year	Title	Role	Notes
2010	Oranges and Sunshine	Ben	
2014	1 on 1	Jamie Johnson	Short
2015	The Witch	Caleb	
2016	Adult Life Skills	Kids Club	
2018	The Devil Outside	Bennet	
2022	The School for Good and Evil	Harvid	

=== Television ===
Year	Title	Role	Notes
2022	Without Sin	Lee McKeller	3 episodes
