= The Witch (2015 film) =

Film by Robert Eggers

- Theatrical release poster
- Directed by: Robert Eggers
- Written by: Robert Eggers
- Produced by: Jay Van Hoy; Lars Knudsen; Jodi Redmond; Daniel Bekerman; Rodrigo Teixeira
- Starring: Anya Taylor-Joy; Ralph Ineson; Kate Dickie; Harvey Scrimshaw; Ellie Grainger; Lucas Dawson
- Cinematography: Jarin Blaschke
- Edited by: Louise Ford
- Music by: Mark Korven
- Production companies: Parts and Labor; RT Features; Rooks Nest Entertainment; Maiden Voyage Pictures; Mott Street Pictures; Code Red Productions; Scythia Films; Pulse Films; Special Projects
- Distributed by: A24 (United States); Elevation Pictures (Canada); Universal Pictures (International)
- Release dates: January 27, 2015 (Sundance); February 19, 2016 (United States)
- Running time: 92 minutes
- Countries: United States; Canada; United Kingdom
- Language: Early Modern English
- Budget: $4 million
- Box office: $40.9 million

The Witch (stylized as The VVitch, and subtitled A New-England Folktale) is a 2015 gothic folk horror film written and directed by Robert Eggers in his feature directorial debut. It stars Anya Taylor-Joy in her feature film debut, alongside Ralph Ineson, Kate Dickie, Harvey Scrimshaw, Ellie Grainger, and Lucas Dawson. Set in 1630s New England, the narrative follows a Puritan family who are preyed upon by an evil force in the woods beyond their farm. In fear and desperation, they turn upon one another even when the oldest daughter is suspected of being a witch.

An international co-production of the United States, the United Kingdom and Canada, the film premiered at the Sundance Film Festival on January 27, 2015, and was widely released by A24 on February 19, 2016. It was a critical and financial success, grossing $40 million against a $4 million budget, and is considered by some to be one of the best horror films of the 2010s and the 21st century.

== Plot ==
In 1630s New England, English settler William and his family—his wife Katherine, teenage daughter Thomasin, preteen son Caleb, and young fraternal twins Mercy and Jonas—are banished from a Puritan settlement over a religious dispute. They build a farm near a large, secluded forest and Katherine bears her fifth child, Samuel. While under Thomasin's care, Samuel abruptly disappears. It is revealed that a witch has stolen and killed Samuel to use his body to make a flying ointment in order to induce transvection.

Devastated by the loss, Katherine spends her days crying and praying. Insisting a wolf took the child, William takes Caleb hunting in the woods to find and kill it when Caleb wonders if the unbaptized Samuel went to Heaven. In response, William discloses that he secretly traded Katherine's prized silver cup for hunting supplies. At the farm, the twins play with the family's billy goat Black Phillip, who they both say talks to them. Katherine blames Thomasin for misplacing her silver cup and holds her responsible for the loss of Samuel. That night, the children overhear their parents arguing about their possible starvation and making plans to return to the settlement before sending Thomasin away to serve another family.

The next morning, Thomasin and Caleb sneak into the forest to check a trap. Their dog Fowler chases a hare, with Caleb in pursuit; the hare frightens their horse, which throws Thomasin to the ground and knocks her unconscious. Caleb becomes lost and discovers Fowler's disemboweled body. Delving further into the thicket, he discovers a hovel from which the witch, disguised as a seductive young woman, emerges and kisses him. Thomasin awakens and finds her way home by following William's voice. As Katherine berates Thomasin for taking Caleb into the woods, William defends Thomasin by reluctantly admitting that he sold the cup and he had first taken Caleb to the woods.

That night, Caleb returns to the farm naked, delirious, and mysteriously ill. Katherine suggests that Caleb has fallen victim to witchcraft and prays for him. The next day, Caleb goes into violent convulsions and vomits a whole apple, before passionately proclaiming his love for Christ and dying peacefully. The twins accuse Thomasin of practicing witchcraft, but she in turn accuses the two of them for their supposed conversations with Black Phillip and confronts their father on his intentions to send her away. Angered by his children's behavior, William locks them all in the goat house.

In the middle of the night, the twins and Thomasin awake to find the witch, appearing as a naked old woman, drinking the blood of a nanny goat. She turns towards them and laughs, then attacks the twins offscreen as Thomasin watches in terror. In the house, Katherine has a hallucinatory vision in which Caleb and Samuel have returned. She takes Samuel and nurses him; in reality, she has exposed her breasts to a raven, which proceeds to peck away at her body. At dawn, William finds the goat stable destroyed, the goats eviscerated, the twins missing, and an unconscious Thomasin with bloodied hands. As she stirs, Black Phillip gores and kills him. An unhinged Katherine blames Thomasin for everything that has happened and tries to strangle her, forcing Thomasin to tearfully kill her mother in self-defense with a billhook.

Now alone, Thomasin enters the goat house and urges Black Phillip to speak to her. The goat responds in a human voice and offers her the life she desires. When she accepts, he materializes into a handsome, black-clad man, tells her to remove her clothes, and guides her hand to sign her name in a book. Accompanied by Black Phillip in his goat form, a naked Thomasin enters the forest where she finds a coven of naked witches holding a Witches' Sabbath around a bonfire. The witches begin to levitate. Thomasin joins them, laughing hysterically as she ascends above the trees.

== Cast ==
- Anya Taylor-Joy as Thomasin, the oldest daughter of a family. An uncredited body double from behind portrayed Thomasin in her nude scene.
- Ralph Ineson as William, the patriarch of his family and the father of Thomasin
- Kate Dickie as Katherine, the wife of William and mother of Thomasin
- Harvey Scrimshaw as Caleb, the brother of Thomasin
- Ellie Grainger as Mercy, the younger sister of Thomasin
- Lucas Dawson as Jonas, the twin sibling of Mercy and younger brother of Thomasin
- Julian Richings as the Governor
- Bathsheba Garnett as The Witch
  - Sarah Stephens as The Witch (young)
- Wahab Chaudhry as Black Phillip (both voice and human form)
  - Charlie as Black Phillip (goat form)

== Production ==
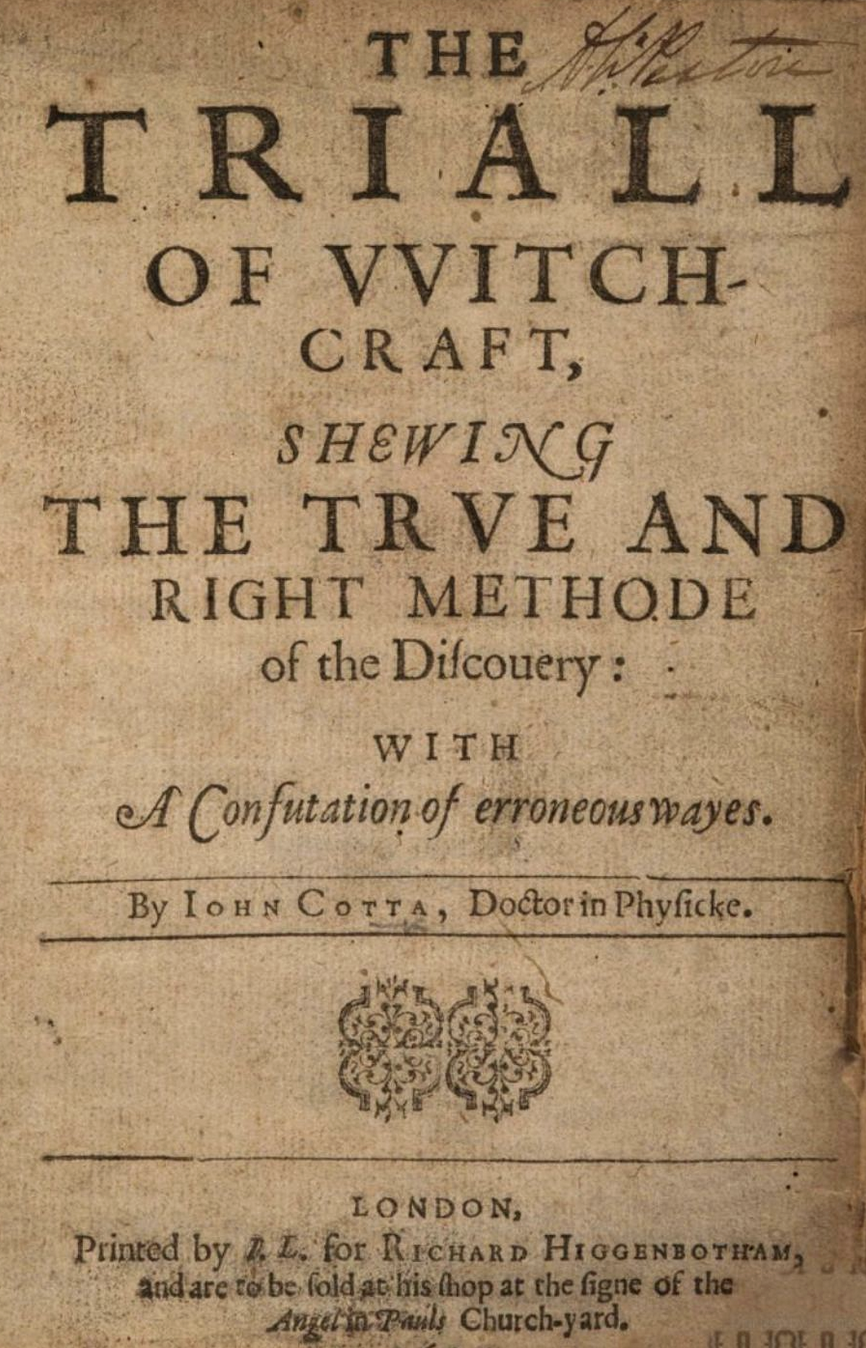
A historical book using the "VVitch" spelling

=== Development ===
Eggers, who lived in New Hampshire, was inspired to write the film by his childhood fascination with witches and frequent visits to the Plimoth Plantation as a schoolboy. After unsuccessfully pitching films that were "too weird, too obscure", Eggers realized that he would have to make a more conventional film. He said at a Q&A, "If I'm going to make a genre film, it has to be personal and it has to be good." Director Alfonso Cuarón read the screenplay in 2013, saying it made him "more than anything, curious." The production team worked extensively with British and American museums, as well as consulting experts on 17th-century British agriculture. Eggers wanted the set constructed to be as historically accurate as possible, and therefore brought in a thatcher and a carpenter from Virginia and Massachusetts, respectively, who had the proper experience building in the style of the film's period.

Although Eggers wanted to film the picture on location in New England, he chose to film in Canada instead due to favorable tax incentives. This proved to be something of a problem for him, because he could not find the forest environment he was looking for in the country. He eventually began scouting "off the map" and found a suitable location (Kiosk, Ontario) that was "extremely remote"; he said that the nearest town "made New Hampshire look like a metropolis".

The casting took place in England, as Eggers wanted authentic accents to represent a family newly arrived in colonial Plymouth.

=== Filming ===
To give the film an authentic look, Eggers shot only "with natural light and indoors, the only lighting was candles". He also chose to stylize the film's title as "The VVitch" (with two "V"s instead of a "W") in the title sequence and on posters, stating that he found this spelling in a Jacobean-era pamphlet on witchcraft, among other period-texts.

In December 2013, costume designer Linda Muir joined the crew, and consulted 35 books in the Clothes of the Common People in Elizabethan and Early Stuart England series to plan the costumes, which were made with wool, linen, and hemp. She also lobbied for a larger costume budget.

A troupe of Butoh dancers played the coven of witches at the end of the film, creating their own choreography.

=== Music ===
Mark Korven wrote the film's score, which aimed to be "tense and dissonant" while focusing on minimalism. Eggers vetoed the use of any electronic instruments and "didn't want any traditional harmony or melody in the score"; so Korven chose to create music with atypical instruments, including the nyckelharpa and waterphone. He knew the director liked to retain a degree of creative control, so he relied on loose play centered on improvisation "so that [Eggers] could move notes around whenever he wanted".

==== Track listing ====
No.	Title	Length
1.	"What Went We"	1:58
2.	"Banished"	1:52
3.	"A Witch Stole Sam"	2:13
4.	"Hare in The Woods"	1:30
5.	"I Am the Witch Mercy"	1:17
6.	"Foster The Children"	1:18
7.	"Caleb is Lost"	1:48
8.	"Caleb's Seduction"	3:05
9.	"Caleb's Death"	5:25
10.	"William And Thomasin"	2:39
11.	"William's Confession"	4:08
12.	"The Goat And The Mayhem"	3:28
13.	"Follow The Goat"	1:15
14.	"Witches Coven"	2:14
15.	"Isle Of Wight"	1:41
16.	"Standish"	2:27
Total length:		38:18

== Themes ==
According to analysts, the film's impact is delivered not through scares, but by the effect of ambience and scenography. This is stylistically represented by the film's use of expressionist lighting, the use of different kinds of camera to draw thematic limits, the editing employed to hide horror from the main sight, and the soundtrack's sonic dissonance accompanying instrumental scenes. Samuel's physically impossible disappearance at the beginning of the film introduces the viewer to the film's atmosphere.

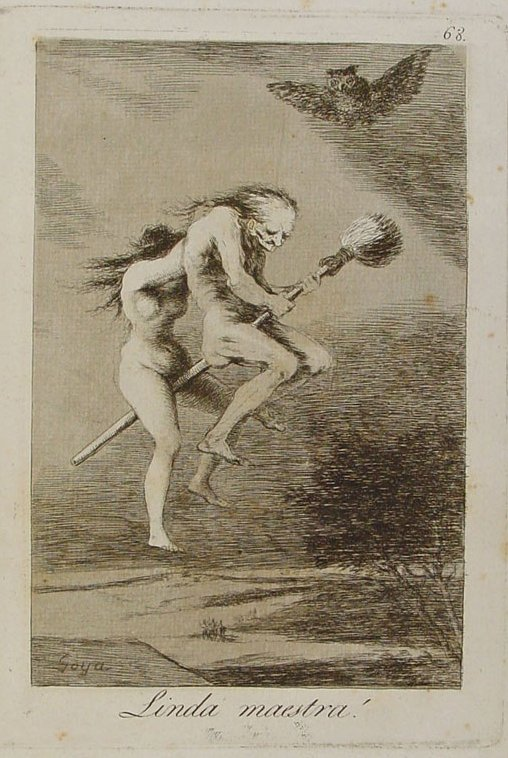
Linda maestra by Francisco de Goya, 1799

The film's plot orbits around a psychological conflict, using a repressive, patriarchal portrayal of Puritan society and the dark, murderous liberation of the witches. The main female character, Thomasin, harbors worldly desires that differ from those of her conventionally Christian family, yearning for independence, sexuality, acceptance, and power. While her father and the Christian God fail to fulfill her needs, Satan speaks personally to her, offering earthly satisfaction. Therefore, with the demise of her family and the rejection of the Puritan society, Thomasin joins Satan and the witches, her only alternative, in order to find her long desired control over her own life. Her nudity in the last scene reflects her act of casting off the bonds of her previous society.

The difference between both options, nevertheless, is rendered blurred by an evocation of equal religious extremism. This is first felt in the architecture of the family's own home, which ironically resembles an archetypal witch's cottage itself, hinting at the gradual reveal that evil is already instilled in them. On the opposite side, Satan's temptation of Thomasin also acquires traits of ideological grooming, slowly alienating her from her family. At the end, despite her newfound cause and ecstatic laugh at the coven, Thomasin has not escaped her previous religiosity, but merely changed its direction, turning to murder in exchange for freedom.

The symbolic conflict between civilization and nature is also present in all aspects of the film. The family lives next to a dark forest, a place tied to witchcraft in their culture, which underlines the conflict between their civilized, patriarchal religion and the Gothic, wild natural world that surrounds them. The forest, as well as the state of nudity, are associated with monstrosity, with the untamed wilderness where forbidden liberation and sexuality emerge. Accordingly, Caleb returns nude after being seduced by the witch, the witches themselves perform their acts while naked, and Thomasin eventually adopts this code upon joining them. At the end of the film, nature triumphs over its adversary, with the Pan-like Black Phillip goring the axe-wielding William in a metaphor for man being consumed by the wild.

== Release ==
The film had its world premiere on January 27, 2015, at the 2015 Sundance Film Festival. It was screened on September 18, 2015, in the Special Presentations section of the 2015 Toronto International Film Festival.

A24 and DirecTV Cinema acquired the film's distribution rights. As it received very positive reactions in advance screenings, the studios decided to give the film a wide theatrical release in the United States, which occurred on February 19, 2016.

The film was released on Blu-ray and digital HD in the United States on May 17, 2016, by Lionsgate Home Entertainment. Special features on the discs include outtakes, an audio commentary by Eggers, the making-of documentary short The Witch: A Primal Folktale, and a 30-minute question-and-answer session featuring Eggers, Taylor-Joy, and historians Richard Trask and Brunonia Barry, which was filmed in Salem, Massachusetts, after a screening of the film. A 4K Ultra HD Blu-ray of the film was released on April 23, 2019.

== Reception ==
=== Box office ===
The Witch grossed $25.1 million in the United States and Canada and $15.3 million in other territories, for a worldwide total theatrical gross of $40.4 million.

In the United States and Canada, the film was released alongside Risen and Race, and was projected to gross $5–7 million from 2,046 theaters in its opening weekend. It made $3.3 million on its first day, and $8.8 million in its opening weekend, finishing fourth at the box office behind Deadpool ($56.5 million), Kung Fu Panda 3 ($12.5 million), and Risen ($11.8 million).

=== Critical response ===
On the review aggregator website Rotten Tomatoes, 91% of 339 critics' reviews are positive, with an average rating of 7.8/10. The website's consensus reads: "As thought-provoking as it is visually compelling, The Witch delivers a deeply unsettling exercise in slow-building horror that suggests great things for debuting writer-director Robert Eggers." Metacritic, which uses a weighted average, assigned the film a score of 84 out of 100, based on 46 critics, indicating "universal acclaim". Audiences polled by CinemaScore gave the film an average grade of "C−" on an A+ to F scale, while PostTrak reported filmgoers gave it a 55% overall positive score and a 41% "definite recommend".

Writing in Variety, Justin Chang commented that "A fiercely committed ensemble and an exquisite sense of historical detail conspire to cast a highly atmospheric spell in The Witch, a strikingly achieved tale of a mid-17th-century New England family's steady descent into religious hysteria and madness." Yohana Desta of Mashable stated that The Witch is a "stunningly crafted experience that'll have you seeking out a church as soon as you leave the theater". Peter Travers, in his Rolling Stone review, gave the film 3½ stars, and wrote of the film: "Building his film on the diabolical aftershocks of Puritan repression, Eggers raises The Witch far above the horror herd. He doesn't need cheap tricks. Eggers merely directs us to look inside." Stephanie Zacharek summarized the movie in Time as "a triumph of tone", writing that "Although Eggers is extremely discreet—the things you don't see are more horrifying than those you do—the picture's relentlessness sometimes feels like torment." Gregory Wakeman, writing for CinemaBlend, gave it five out of five stars, writing that "[its] acting, lighting, music, writing, production design, cinematography, editing, and direction all immediately impress. While, at the same time, they combine to create an innately bewitching tale that keeps you on tenterhooks all the way up until its grandiose but enthralling finale." Ann Hornaday wrote in The Washington Post that the film joins the ranks of horror films such as The Exorcist, The Omen, and Rosemary's Baby, saying that The Witch "comports itself less like an imitator of those classics than their progenitor", which is "a tribute to a filmmaker who, despite his newcomer status, seems to have arrived in the full throes of maturity, in full control of his prodigious powers." Writing for Best of Netflix, Debiparna Chakraborty praised the narrative, saying "The Witch is a mesmerising exploration of the mundane horrors often spawned by barren isolation and religious fervour." Independent filmmaker Jay Bauman of RedLetterMedia named it his favorite film of 2016, enthusiastically stating: "I love it, I think it's a masterpiece... It's a first-time filmmaker which is shocking to me...because it feels like it's made by someone who's been making movies for decades who's a master of their craft".

However, some critics, as well as audiences, were less pleased with the film. Ethan Sacks of the New York Daily News wrote that the film does not suffer from the cinematography, acting, or setting, and early on it "seems that The Witch is tapping a higher metaphor for coming of age...or religious intolerance...or man's uneasy balance with nature...or something. It doesn't take long into the film's hour and a half running time, however, to break that spell." Critics noted that the film received backlash from audiences regarding its themes and slow approach to horror. Lesley Coffin criticized A24, saying it was "a huge mistake" to market The Witch as a terrifying horror film:

Not because it doesn't fit into the genre of horror, but because of the power of expectations. The less you know about this movie the better your experience will be, but everyone who saw it opening weekend probably walked in with too much knowledge and hype to really get as much out of it as they could have if the film had the veil of mystery.

HitFix writer Chris Eggertson blamed mainstream Hollywood more generally for the unenthusiastic response of some audiences, saying that The Witch "got under [his] skin profoundly, but it did not have the moment-to-moment, audience-pleasing shocks that moviegoers have become accustomed to thanks to movies like Sinister and The Purge and Paranormal Activity and every other Blumhouse and Platinum Dunes title in the canon."

Horror authors Stephen King and Brian Keene both reacted positively to the film. King tweeted significant praise for the film, writing: "The Witch scared the hell out of me. And it's a real movie, tense and thought-provoking as well as visceral." On social media, Keene stated: "The Witch is a gorgeous, thoughtful, scary horror film that 90% of the people in the theater with you will be too stupid to understand."

In July 2025, it was one of the films voted for the "Readers' Choice" edition of The New York Times' list of "The 100 Best Movies of the 21st Century," finishing at number 136. It also ranked number 11 on The Hollywood Reporter's list of the "25 Best Horror Movies of the 21st Century."

==== Religious interpretation ====
Julia Alexander of Polygon wrote that The Witch "asks people to try and understand what life would have been like for a family of devout Christians living in solitude, terrified of what may happen if they go against the word of God". In The Atlantic, Alissa Wilkinson stated that many films featured at the 2015 Sundance Film Festival, including The Witch, reveal a "resurgence of interest in the religious". Eve Tushnet commented in an article in TAC, which was also published in First Things, that The Witch's view of witchcraft is "not revisionist" and further said the film is "pervaded by the fear of God. There are occasional references to His mercy but only as something to beg for, not something to trust in".

A review by Adam R. Holz in Plugged In, a publication of the conservative Christian organisation Focus on the Family, heavily criticised the film, stating that "William is absolutely devoted to leading his family in holiness and the ways of the Lord, which should be a good thing. But the fruit of William's rigorous focus on dogmatic piety ... is deep fear and morbid meditations on hell, damnation and the forces of spiritual darkness." Josh Larsen of Think Christian, however, offered a different Christian explanation of the conclusion of the film, writing: "When it comes to encountering evil, the family in the film veers wildly back and forth between 'triumphalism' and 'defeatism,' two theological extremes", and "in refusing to allow for grace, they become easy pickings for the witch."

Emily VanDerWerff of Vox wrote:

A24 could have just as easily courted the approval of, say, theologians who have a fondness for Calvinism. The Witch takes place in Colonial America, and it unfolds from the perspective of period Christians who genuinely believe the woods around their tiny farm contain some sort of evil, supernatural being—and are ultimately proved correct.

=== Accolades ===
List of awards and nominations
Award	Date of ceremony	Category	Recipient(s)	Result	Ref.
Austin Film Critics Association	December 28, 2016	Best First Film	The Witch	Won	
Austin Film Critics Association	December 28, 2016	Breakthrough Artist Award	Anya Taylor-Joy	Nominated	
Boston Society of Film Critics	December 11, 2016	Best New Filmmaker	Robert Eggers	Won	
Bram Stoker Awards	April 29, 2017	Superior Achievement in a Screenplay	Robert Eggers	Won	
Chicago Film Critics Association	December 15, 2016	Best Art Direction	The Witch	Nominated	
Chicago Film Critics Association	December 15, 2016	Most Promising Filmmaker	Robert Eggers	Won	
Critics Choice Awards	December 11, 2016	Best Sci-Fi/Horror Movie	The Witch	Nominated	
Empire Awards	March 19, 2017	Best Horror	The Witch	Won	
Empire Awards	March 19, 2017	Best Female Newcomer	Anya Taylor-Joy	Won	
Fangoria Chainsaw Awards	October 2, 2017	Best Film	The Witch	Won	
Fangoria Chainsaw Awards	October 2, 2017	Best Actress	Anya Taylor-Joy	Won	
Fangoria Chainsaw Awards	October 2, 2017	Best Supporting Actor	Ralph Ineson	Nominated	
Fangoria Chainsaw Awards	October 2, 2017	Best Score	Mark Korven	Nominated	
Golden Tomato Awards	January 12, 2017	Best Horror Movie 2016	The Witch	Won	
Golden Trailer Awards	May 4, 2016	Best Horror	"Family"	Won	
Golden Trailer Awards	May 4, 2016	Best Horror TV Spot	"Life"	Nominated	
Golden Trailer Awards	May 4, 2016	Best Sound Editing in a TV Spot	"Paranoia"	Won	
Gotham Awards	November 28, 2016	Breakthrough Actor	Anya Taylor-Joy	Won	
Gotham Awards	November 28, 2016	Bingham Ray Breakthrough Director Award	Robert Eggers	Nominated	
Independent Spirit Awards	February 25, 2017	Best First Screenplay	Robert Eggers	Won	
Independent Spirit Awards	February 25, 2017	Best First Feature	Robert Eggers, Daniel Bekerman, Jay Van Hoy, Lars Knudsen, Jodi Redmond and Rodrigo Teixeira	Won	
London Film Critics' Circle	January 22, 2017	Young British/Irish Performer of the Year	Anya Taylor-Joy (also for Morgan and Split)	Nominated	
London Film Festival	October 18, 2015	Sutherland Award	Robert Eggers	Won	
Festival international du film fantastique de Gérardmer	January 31, 2016	Prix du jury SyFy	The Witch	Won	
New York Film Critics Online	December 11, 2016	Best Debut Director	Robert Eggers	Won	
Online Film Critics Society	January 3, 2017	Best Picture	The Witch	Nominated	
San Diego Film Critics Society	December 12, 2016	Breakthrough Artist	Anya Taylor-Joy	Nominated	
San Francisco Film Critics Circle	December 11, 2016	Best Production Design	Craig Lathrop	Nominated	
Saturn Awards	June 28, 2017	Best Horror Film	The Witch	Nominated	
Saturn Awards	June 28, 2017	Best Performance by a Younger Actor	Anya Taylor-Joy	Nominated	
Seattle Film Critics Society	January 5, 2017	Best Picture of the Year	The Witch	Nominated	
Seattle Film Critics Society	January 5, 2017	Best Director	Robert Eggers	Nominated	
Seattle Film Critics Society	January 5, 2017	Best Cinematography	Jarin Blaschke	Nominated	
Seattle Film Critics Society	January 5, 2017	Best Costume Design	Linda Muir	Nominated	
Seattle Film Critics Society	January 5, 2017	Best Youth Performance	Anya Taylor-Joy	Won	
Seattle Film Critics Society	January 5, 2017	Best Youth Performance	Harvey Scrimshaw	Nominated	
Seattle Film Critics Society	January 5, 2017	Best Villain	Charlie and Wahab Chaudary (as Black Phillip)	Nominated	
St. Louis Gateway Film Critics Association	December 18, 2016	Best Horror/Science-Fiction Film	The Witch	Won	
Sundance Film Festival	February 1, 2015	Directing Award	Robert Eggers	Won	
Sundance Film Festival	February 1, 2015	Grand Jury Prize	Robert Eggers	Nominated	
Toronto Film Critics Association	December 11, 2016	Best First Feature	The Witch	Won	
Washington D.C. Area Film Critics Association	December 5, 2016	Best Youth Performance	Anya Taylor-Joy	Nominated	
Washington D.C. Area Film Critics Association	December 5, 2016	Best Art Direction	Craig Lathrop	Nominated	

== Related media ==
=== Music ===
In 2025, King Mala released And You Who Drowned in the Grief of a Golden Thing, an album referencing The Witch through lyrics and visual. The track "SWEET LAMB" refers to the famous "Wouldst thou like the taste of butter? Wouldst thou like to live deliciously?".

== See also ==
- List of films about witchcraft
- Witch trials in the early modern period
