= Jérôme Eltabet =

Irish film editor

- Occupation: Editor
- Years active: 2003–present
- Notable work: Revenge; The Substance

Jérôme Eltabet is a French film editor. He gained recognition for editing Revenge and The Substance.

== Accolades ==
Year	Award	Category	Work	Result	Notes	Ref.
2024	Indiana Film Journalist Association (IFJA)	Best Editing	The Substance	Won	Shared with Coralie Fargeat and Valentin Feron	
2024	Online Association of Female Film Critics (OAFFC)	Best Editing	The Substance	Nominated	Shared with Coralie Fargeat and Valentin Feron	
2025	Pittsburgh Film Critics Association Awards (PFCA)	Best Editing	The Substance	Nominated	Shared with Coralie Fargeat and Valentin Feron	
2025	Brazil Online Awards (BOFA)	Best Editing	The Substance	Nominated	Shared with Coralie Fargeat and Valentin Feron	
2025	Golden Scythe Horror Awards	Best Editing	The Substance	Won	Shared with Coralie Fargeat and Valentin Feron	
2025	Portland Critics Association Awards (PCA)	Best Editing	The Substance	Nominated	Shared with Coralie Fargeat and Valentin Feron	
2025	Seattle Film Critics Society (SFCS)	Best Editing	The Substance	Nominated	Shared with Coralie Fargeat and Valentin Feron	
2025	BFE Cut Above Awards	Best Edited Single Drama	The Substance	Nominated	Shared with Coralie Fargeat and Valentin Feron	
2025	Columbus Film Critics Association	Best Editing Film	The Substance	Nominated	Shared with Coralie Fargeat and Valentin Feron	
2025	Discussing Film Critic Awards	Best Editing Film	The Substance	Nominated	Shared with Coralie Fargeat and Valentin Feron	
2025	Latinos Entertainment Journalists Association Film Awards	Best Editing	The Substance	Nominated	Shared with Coralie Fargeat and Valentin Feron	
2025	Golden Derby Film Awards	Best Editing	The Substance	Won	Shared with Coralie Fargeat and Valentin Feron	
2025	International Online Cinema Awards	Best Film Editing	The Substance	Nominated	Shared with Coralie Fargeat and Valentin Feron	
2025	Utah Film Critics Association Awards	Best Film Editing	The Substance	Nominated	Shared with Coralie Fargeat and Valentin Feron	
2025	Alliance of Women Film Journalists	Best Film Editing	The Substance	Nominated	Shared with Coralie Fargeat and Valentin Feron	
2025	Austin Film Critics Association	Best Film Editing	The Substance	Won	Shared with Coralie Fargeat and Valentin Feron	
2025	Online Film Critics Society Awards	Best Editing	The Substance	Nominated	Shared with Coralie Fargeat and Valentin Feron	
2025	American Cinema Editors	Best Edited feature film - comedy, theatrical	The Substance	Nominated	Shared with Coralie Fargeat and Valentin Feron	

== Filmography ==
Year	Title	Notes	Ref.
2003	Alinghi: The Inside Story		
2003	Les Ombres	Short	
2004	Les dessous des poupées	Short	
2004	Samantha oups!	Edited 4 episodes	
2008	Les Feés Cloches	15 episodes	
2012	Soda	109 episodes	
2012	Nos Chers Voisins	59 episodes	
2014	Hero Corp: La Voie de Klaus	6 episodes	
2016	Sale Temps pour la planéte	1 episode	
2017	Revenge		
2017	Les étonnantes vertus de la méditation		
2018	Joséphine, ange gardien	3 episodes	
2019	Ce soir ou jamais	Short	
2019	Enquéte Exclusive	1 episode	
2019	Match	Short	
2020	Demain c’est confinement	1 episode	
2021	Dieu n'est plus médecin	Short	
2021	Tomorrow Is Ours	135 episodes	
2024	The Substance		
2024	Room Service	Short	
