= Charlie (goat) =

Goat actor

- Species: Goat
- Sex: Male
- Occupation: Animal actor
- Notable role: Black Phillip
- Known for: The Witch
- Weight: 210 lb (95 kg)

Charlie is a male goat and animal actor. He is best known for his role as Black Phillip in the 2015 horror film The Witch directed by Robert Eggers.

== Acting ==
During the production of The Witch, animal trainer Anna Kilch showed images of potential goat actors to director Robert Eggers. He chose Charlie, a black he-goat with large horns who weighed 210 pounds (95 kg), for the role of Black Philip. He said that Charlie was chosen because he "looked the Black Phillip-iest." Charlie had the largest horns of the potential goats.

Charlie was noted for his inappropriate behavior on set. Eggers said that "If we wanted him to be doing something violent, he wanted to go to sleep. If he was supposed to be standing still, he was running around like a madman." Charlie frequently attacked co-star Ralph Ineson; Ineson said that they had "hate at first sight." Charlie weighed 50 pounds (23 kg) more than Ineson during filming, and thus easily overpowered him. Charlie rammed Ineson in the ribs on the fourth day of filming and dislodged a tendon, forcing Ineson to take pain medication for the remaining period of filming. Ineson was hospitalized three times due to attacks by Charlie.

Eggers was unwilling to replace Charlie with CGI, so he commissioned two puppets depicting Charlie. He was unsatisfied with their appearance, and they were not used. Several scenes were cut from the film because Charlie was unwilling to cooperate. Eggers later said that "the goat was a fucking nightmare." In an interview, Ineson said of goats: "You can't train a goat; they're satanic animals, they do exactly what they want when they want." After completing filming, Ineson took his wife and Eggers to a restaurant in London called The Smoking Goat and ate a goat meat dish in order to spite Charlie.

Despite his misbehavior on set, Charlie's performance was well-received by critics. Writing for Film School Rejects, reviewer Christopher Campbell said that Charlie was deserving of an Oscar for his role as Black Phillip. Seth Abramovitch of The Hollywood Reporter described him as "the breakout goat." In response to Charlie's reception, Ineson said, "It's wonderful that his fantastic performance is bringing notoriety to the film, but there's a little part of me that's like, seriously? That f—er? [sic]."

Charlie also had a minor role in the 2017 film It Comes at Night directed by Trey Edward Shults.

== Filmography ==
Year	Title	Role	Refs.
2015	The Witch	Black Phillip	
2017	It Comes at Night	Goat	
