= Daniel Malik =

Canadian actor, model (born 1992)

Daniel Malik (born Daniel Chaudhry, 31 March 1992), formerly known as Wahab Chaudhry, is a Canadian actor and model who is best known for being the voice (and – briefly – the human form) of the character Black Phillip in The Witch (2015).

His role as Black Phillip, his first feature film, got him nominated for best villain at the Seattle Film Critics Awards in 2017. Funko made a Pop! collectible of his character. Malik believes one of the reasons he got the role was that director Robert Eggers had a sketch book of how he thought the movie should look and his drawings for the Black Phillip character looked exactly like Malik, whom he had never met.

Malik has gone on to act in two episodes of season two, and one episode of season four, of The Expanse, coming back for season four as a new character because of fan support.

Malik, whose father emigrated from Pakistan to Canada, was born in Toronto, Ontario. Early in his modelling career, he met Canadian designer Hussein Dhalla who got him involved in Toronto Men's Fashion Week as their first South Asian male runway model.

Malik was born with the name Daniel Chaudhry, but an uncle didn't like the name Daniel, so Wahab Chaudhry became his given legal name which was the name he modeled under. His earliest acting work was under the name Daniel Chaudhry, and for Mother's Day 2019 he took his mother's name and is known as Daniel Malik.
