= Sam Now =

2022 independent film

- Directed by: Reed Harkness; Jason Reid
- Written by: Reed Harkness
- Produced by: Reed Harkness; Jason Reid
- Starring: Doris Harkness; Jared Harkness; Jois Harkness; Randy Harkness; Reed Harkness; Sam Harkness
- Cinematography: Reed Harkness
- Edited by: Darren Lund; Jason Reid
- Music by: Roger Neill
- Production companies: ITVS; Independent Lens; HA/HA; 2R Films; Centripetal Films; Roped In Productions; Lucid Visual Media
- Distributed by: Independent Lens; 8Above
- Release date: May 1, 2022 (Hot Docs Film Festival)
- Running time: 87 minutes
- Country: United States
- Language: English

Sam Now is an American 2022 feature documentary directed by Reed Harkness about his brother, Sam Harkness. It chronicles Sam's life for over twenty-five years. The film was made using many camera formats of Super-8, VHS, Mini DV, Super16, HD and Arri Alexa.

== Synopsis ==
Two half-brothers in Seattle, Washington, Reed Harkness and Sam Harkness, go on a 2,000-mile road trip to find Sam's missing mother. Along with vérité footage, Reed used a range of fictional films and home movies to document Sam and their journey with the hope to break the cycle of intergenerational trauma.

== Reception ==
Sam Now was nominated for a Peabody Award in May 2024.

The film won Best Documentary at the 2022 Zurich Film Festival. The film's editors, Darren Lund and Jason Reid, were nominated for Best Editing at the 2022 International Documentary Association Awards.
