= 26th Critics' Choice Awards =

2021 US film and television awards

- Title card
- Date: March 7, 2021
- Hosted by: Taye Diggs

Highlights
- Most wins: Film: Nomadland (4); Television: The Crown (4)
- Most nominations: Film: Mank (12); Television: The Crown / Ozark (6)
- Best Picture: Nomadland
- Best Comedy Series: Ted Lasso
- Best Drama Series: The Crown
- Best Limited Series: The Queen's Gambit
- Best Movie Made for Television: Hamilton
- Website: www.criticschoice.com

Television/radio coverage
- Network: The CW

The 26th Critics' Choice Awards were presented on March 7, 2021, honoring the finest achievements of filmmaking and television programming in 2020. The ceremony was broadcast on The CW and Taye Diggs returned to host for the third consecutive time. The television nominations were announced on January 18, 2021. The film nominations were announced on February 8, 2021. Mank led the film nominations with 12, followed by Minari with 10. The Crown and Ozark led the television nominations with six each. Overall, Netflix received a total of 72 nominations, 46 for film and 26 for television, the most for any studio or network.

== Winners and nominees ==
=== Film ===
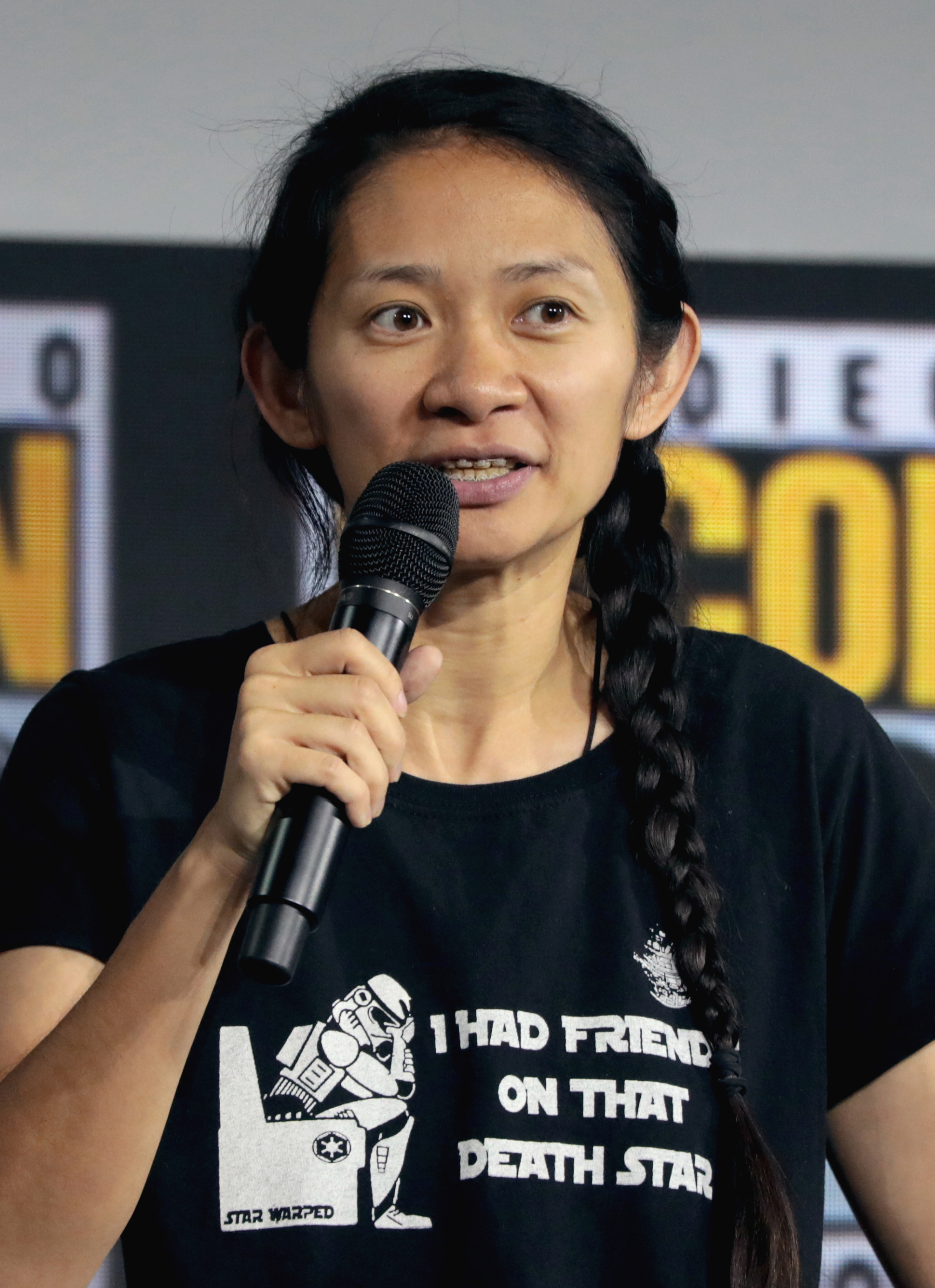
Chloé Zhao, Best Director and Best Adapted Screenplay winner

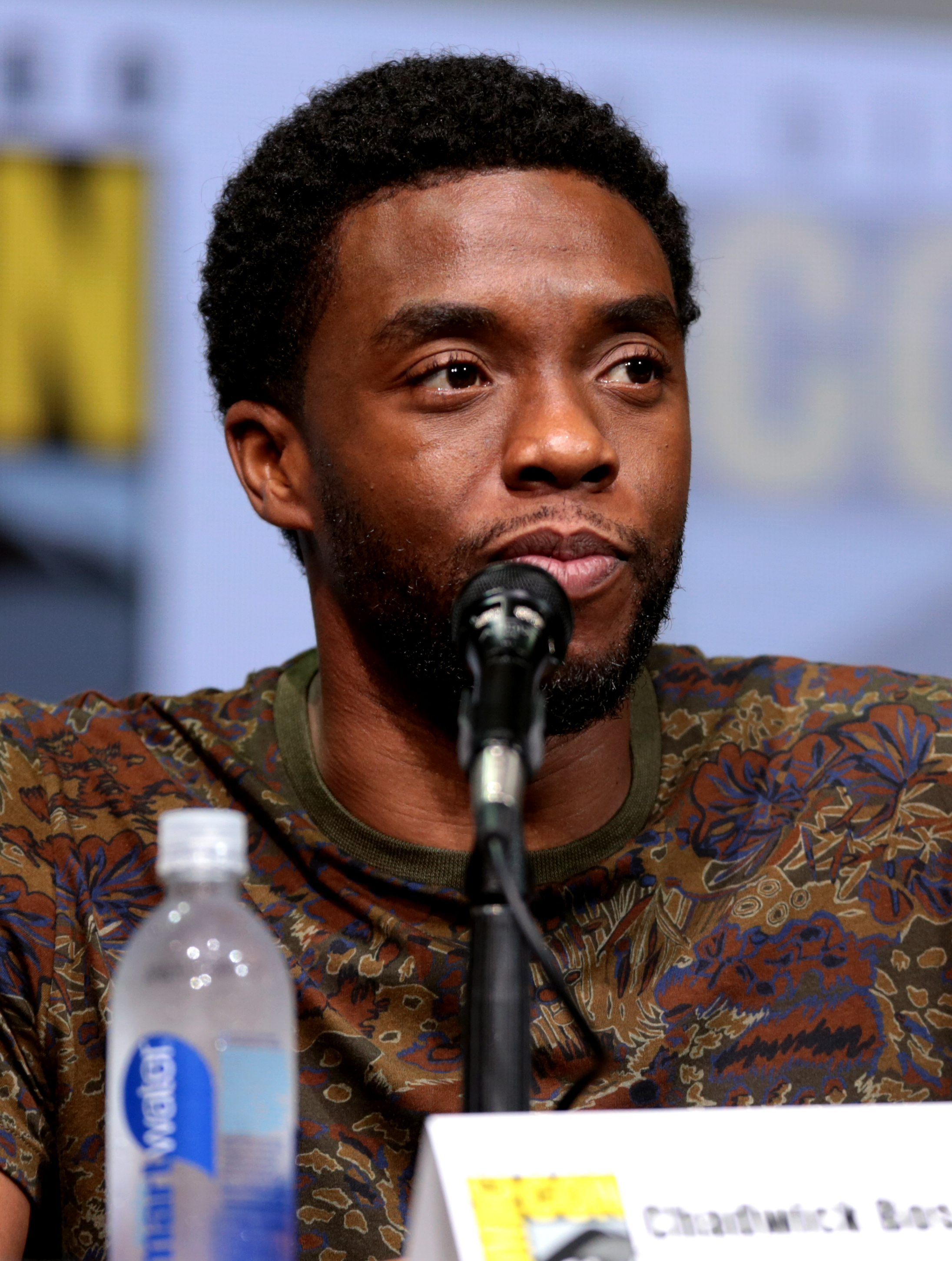
Chadwick Boseman, Best Actor winner

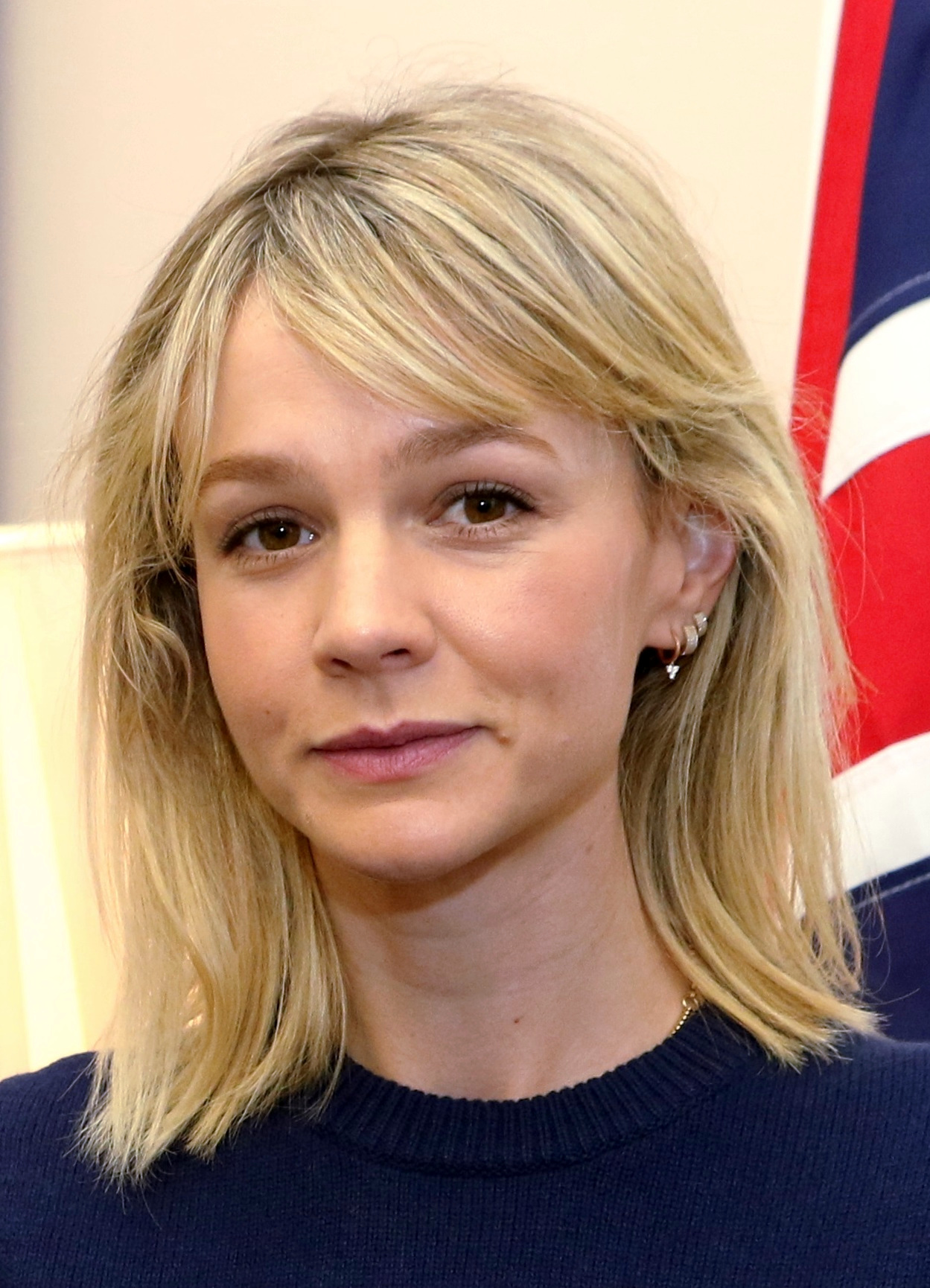
Carey Mulligan, Best Actress winner

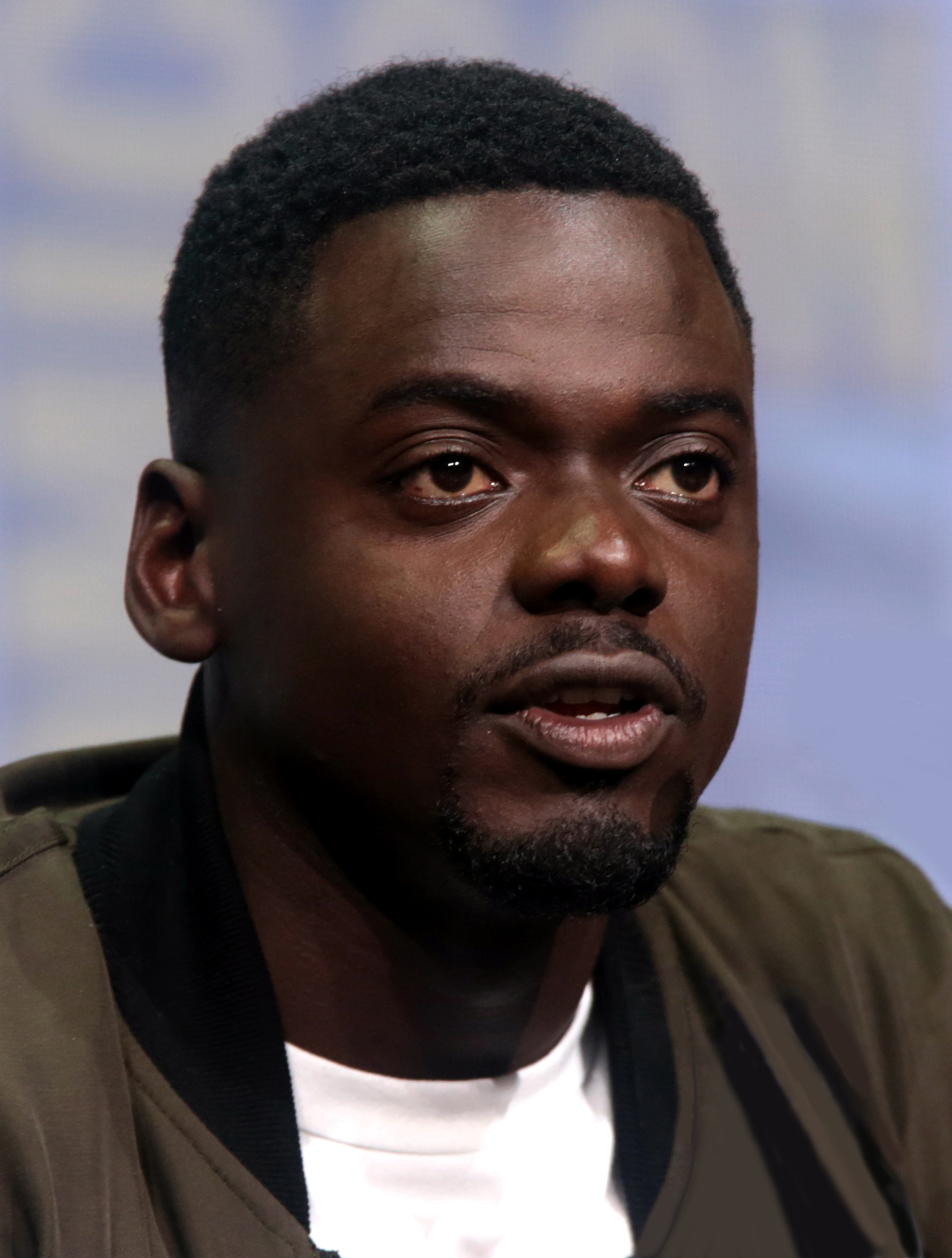
Daniel Kaluuya, Best Supporting Actor winner

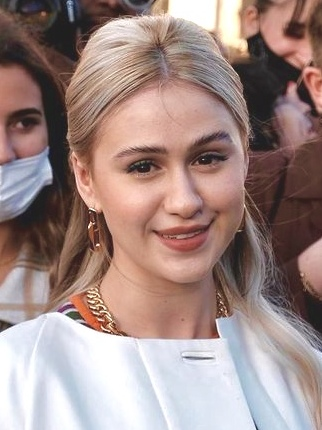
Maria Bakalova, Best Supporting Actress winner

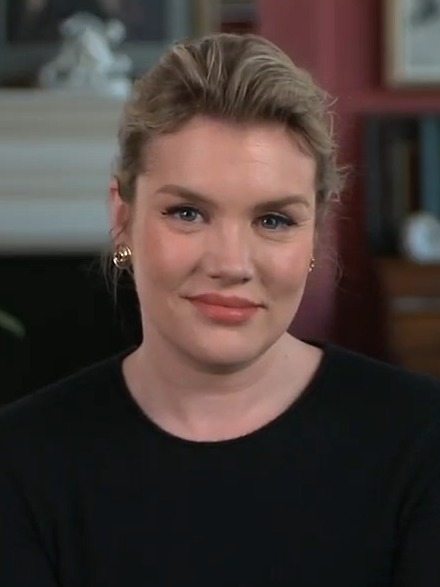
Emerald Fennell, Best Original Screenplay winner

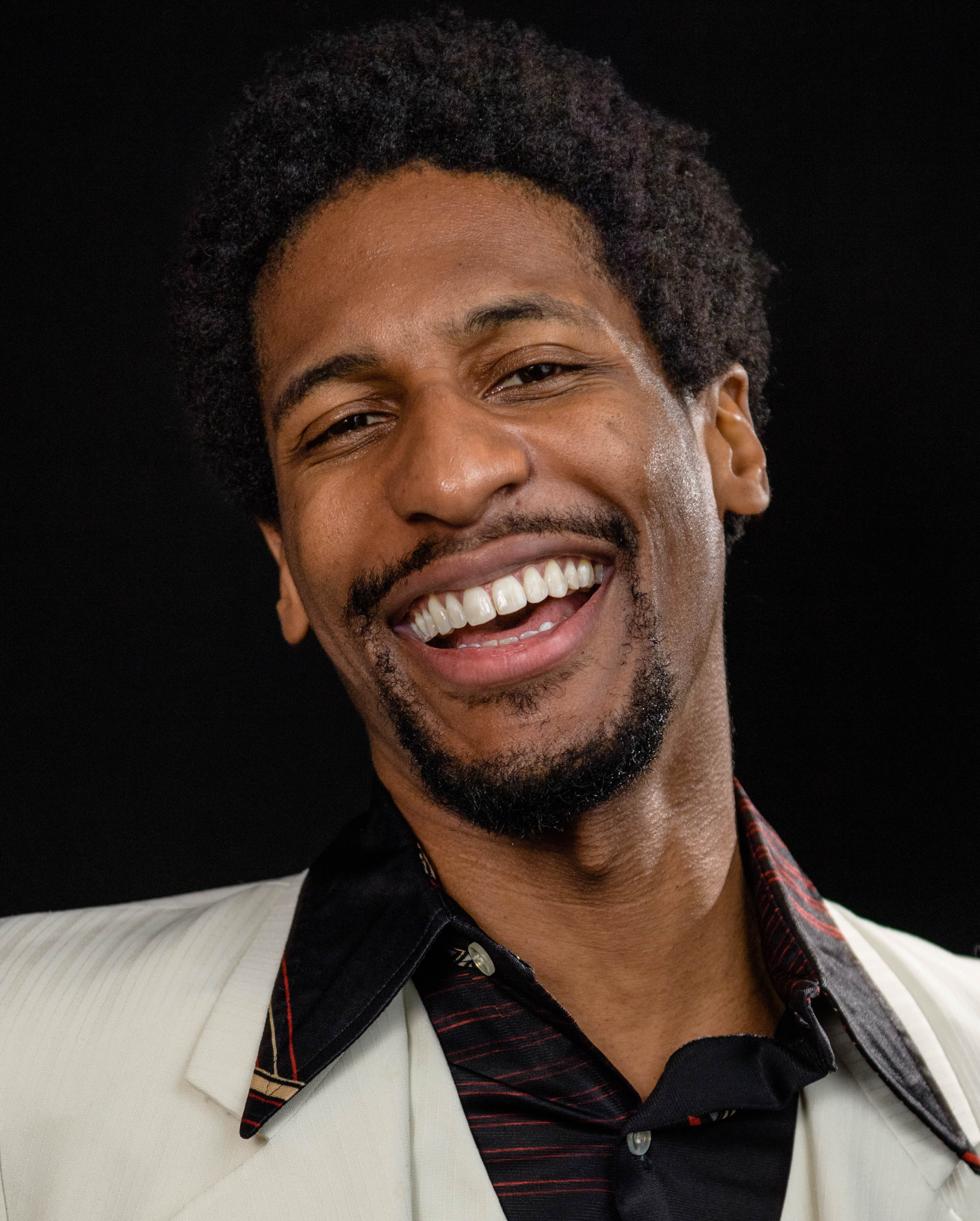
Jon Batiste, Best Score co-winner

Best Picture: Nomadland; Da 5 Bloods (Note: Won Best Action Movie at the 1st Critics' Choice Super Awards); Ma Rainey's Black Bottom; Mank; Minari; News of the World; One Night in Miami...; Promising Young Woman; Sound of Metal; The Trial of the Chicago 7	Best Director: Chloé Zhao – Nomadland; Lee Isaac Chung – Minari; Emerald Fennell – Promising Young Woman; David Fincher – Mank; Regina King – One Night in Miami...; Spike Lee – Da 5 Bloods; Aaron Sorkin – The Trial of the Chicago 7
Best Actor: Chadwick Boseman – Ma Rainey's Black Bottom as Levee Green (posthumous); Ben Affleck – The Way Back as Jack Cunningham; Riz Ahmed – Sound of Metal as Ruben Stone; Tom Hanks – News of the World as Captain Jefferson Kyle Kidd; Anthony Hopkins – The Father as Anthony; Delroy Lindo – Da 5 Bloods as Paul (Note: Won Best Actor in an Action Movie at the 1st Critics' Choice Super Awards); Gary Oldman – Mank as Herman J. Mankiewicz; Steven Yeun – Minari as Jacob Yi	Best Actress: Carey Mulligan – Promising Young Woman as Cassandra "Cassie" Thomas; Viola Davis – Ma Rainey's Black Bottom as Ma Rainey; Andra Day – The United States vs. Billie Holiday as Billie Holiday; Sidney Flanigan – Never Rarely Sometimes Always as Autumn Callahan; Vanessa Kirby – Pieces of a Woman as Martha Weiss; Frances McDormand – Nomadland as Fern; Zendaya – Malcolm & Marie as Marie Jones
Best Supporting Actor: Daniel Kaluuya – Judas and the Black Messiah as Fred Hampton; Sacha Baron Cohen – The Trial of the Chicago 7 as Abbie Hoffman; Chadwick Boseman – Da 5 Bloods as "Stormin'" Norman Earl Holloway (posthumous); Bill Murray – On the Rocks as Felix Keane; Leslie Odom Jr. – One Night in Miami... as Sam Cooke; Paul Raci – Sound of Metal as Joe	Best Supporting Actress: Maria Bakalova – Borat Subsequent Moviefilm as Tutar Sagdiyev; Ellen Burstyn – Pieces of a Woman as Elizabeth Weiss; Glenn Close – Hillbilly Elegy as Bonnie "Mamaw" Vance; Olivia Colman – The Father as Anne; Amanda Seyfried – Mank as Marion Davies; Youn Yuh-jung – Minari as Soon-ja
Best Young Actor/Actress: Alan Kim – Minari as David Yi; Ryder Allen – Palmer as Sam; Ibrahima Gueye – The Life Ahead as Momo; Talia Ryder – Never Rarely Sometimes Always as Skylar; Caoilinn Springall – The Midnight Sky as Young Iris "Sully" Sullivan; Helena Zengel – News of the World as Johanna Leonberger / Cicada	Best Acting Ensemble: The Trial of the Chicago 7; Da 5 Bloods; Judas and the Black Messiah; Ma Rainey's Black Bottom; Minari; One Night in Miami...
Best Original Screenplay: Emerald Fennell – Promising Young Woman; Lee Isaac Chung – Minari; Jack Fincher – Mank; Eliza Hittman – Never Rarely Sometimes Always; Darius Marder and Abraham Marder – Sound of Metal; Aaron Sorkin – The Trial of the Chicago 7	Best Adapted Screenplay: Chloé Zhao – Nomadland; Paul Greengrass and Luke Davies – News of the World; Kemp Powers – One Night in Miami...; Jonathan Raymond and Kelly Reichardt – First Cow; Ruben Santiago-Hudson – Ma Rainey's Black Bottom; Florian Zeller and Christopher Hampton – The Father
Best Cinematography: Joshua James Richards – Nomadland; Christopher Blauvelt – First Cow; Erik Messerschmidt – Mank; Lachlan Milne – Minari; Newton Thomas Sigel – Da 5 Bloods; Hoyte van Hoytema – Tenet (Note: Nominated for Best Action Movie at the 1st Critics' Choice Super Awards); Dariusz Wolski – News of the World	Best Editing: Alan Baumgarten – The Trial of the Chicago 7 (TIE); Mikkel E. G. Nielsen – Sound of Metal (TIE); Kirk Baxter – Mank; Jennifer Lame – Tenet; Yorgos Lamprinos – The Father; Chloé Zhao – Nomadland
Best Costume Design: Ann Roth – Ma Rainey's Black Bottom; Alexandra Byrne – Emma; Bina Daigeler – Mulan; Suzie Harman and Robert Worley – The Personal History of David Copperfield; Nancy Steiner – Promising Young Woman; Trish Summerville – Mank	Best Production Design: Donald Graham Burt and Jan Pascale – Mank; Cristina Casali and Charlotte Dirickx – The Personal History of David Copperfield; David Crank and Elizabeth Keenan – News of the World; Nathan Crowley and Kathy Lucas – Tenet; Stella Fox and Kave Quinn – Emma; Karen O'Hara, Mark Ricker, and Diana Stoughton – Ma Rainey's Black Bottom
Best Score: Jon Batiste, Trent Reznor, and Atticus Ross – Soul (Note: Won Best Animated Movie at the 1st Critics' Choice Super Awards); Alexandre Desplat – The Midnight Sky; Ludwig Göransson – Tenet; James Newton Howard – News of the World; Emile Mosseri – Minari; Trent Reznor and Atticus Ross – Mank	Best Song: "Speak Now" – One Night in Miami...; "Everybody Cries" – The Outpost; "Fight for You" – Judas and the Black Messiah; "Husavik (My Home Town)" – Eurovision Song Contest: The Story of Fire Saga; "Io sì (Seen)" – The Life Ahead; "Tigress & Tweed" – The United States vs. Billie Holiday
Best Hair and Makeup: Ma Rainey's Black Bottom; Emma; Hillbilly Elegy; Mank; Promising Young Woman; The United States vs. Billie Holiday	Best Visual Effects: Tenet; Greyhound; The Invisible Man (Note: Won Best Horror Movie at the 1st Critics' Choice Super Awards); Mank; The Midnight Sky; Mulan; Wonder Woman 1984
Best Comedy: Palm Springs (Note: Won Best Science Fiction/Fantasy Movie at the 1st Critics' Choice Super Awards); Borat Subsequent Moviefilm; The Forty-Year-Old Version; The King of Staten Island; On the Rocks; The Prom	Best Foreign Language Film: Minari • United States; Another Round • Denmark / Netherlands / Sweden; Collective • Luxembourg / Romania; La Llorona • Guatemala; The Life Ahead • Italy; Two of Us • France

==== #SeeHer Award ====
- Zendaya

=== Television ===
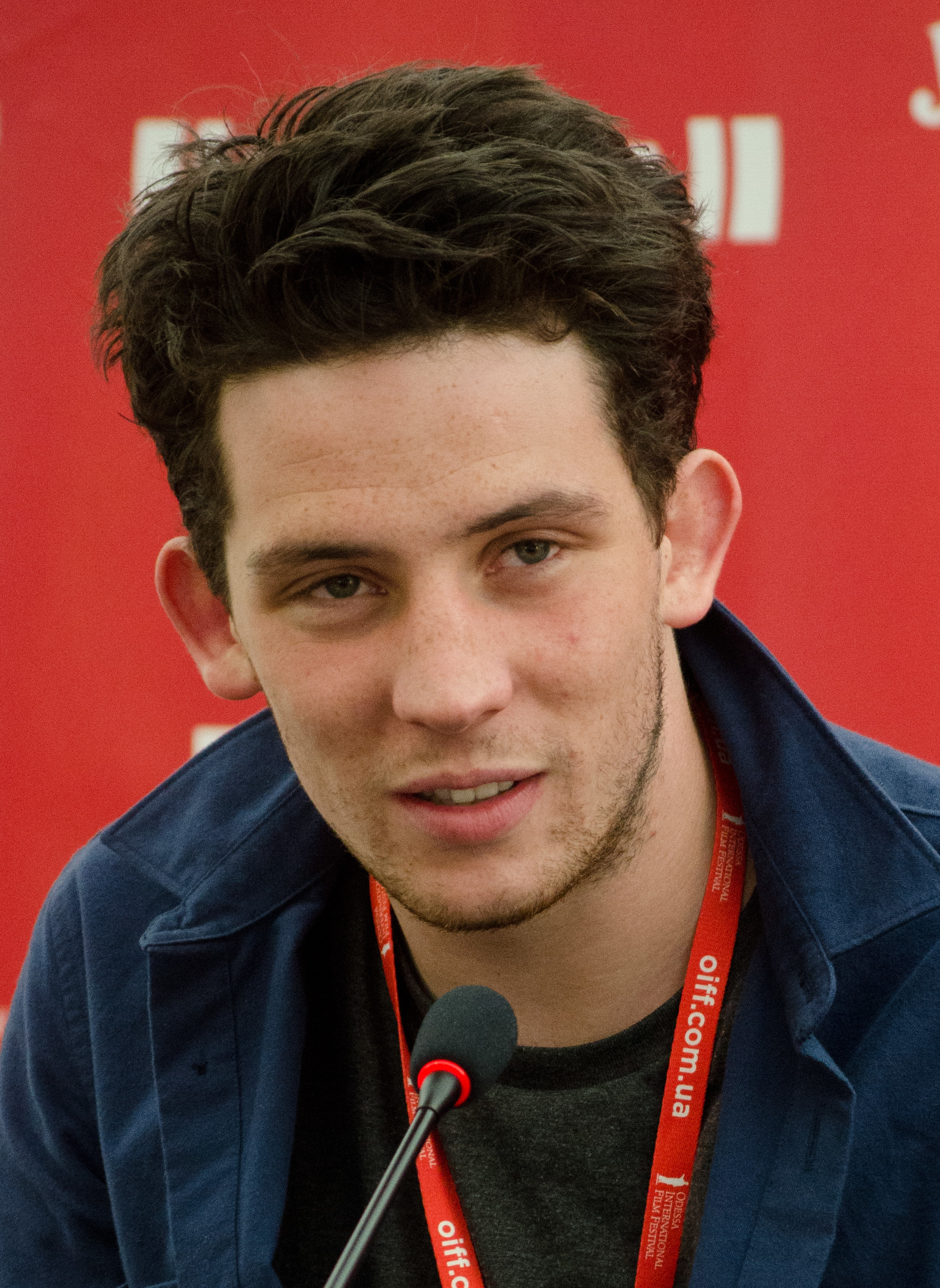
Josh O'Connor, Best Actor in a Drama Series winner

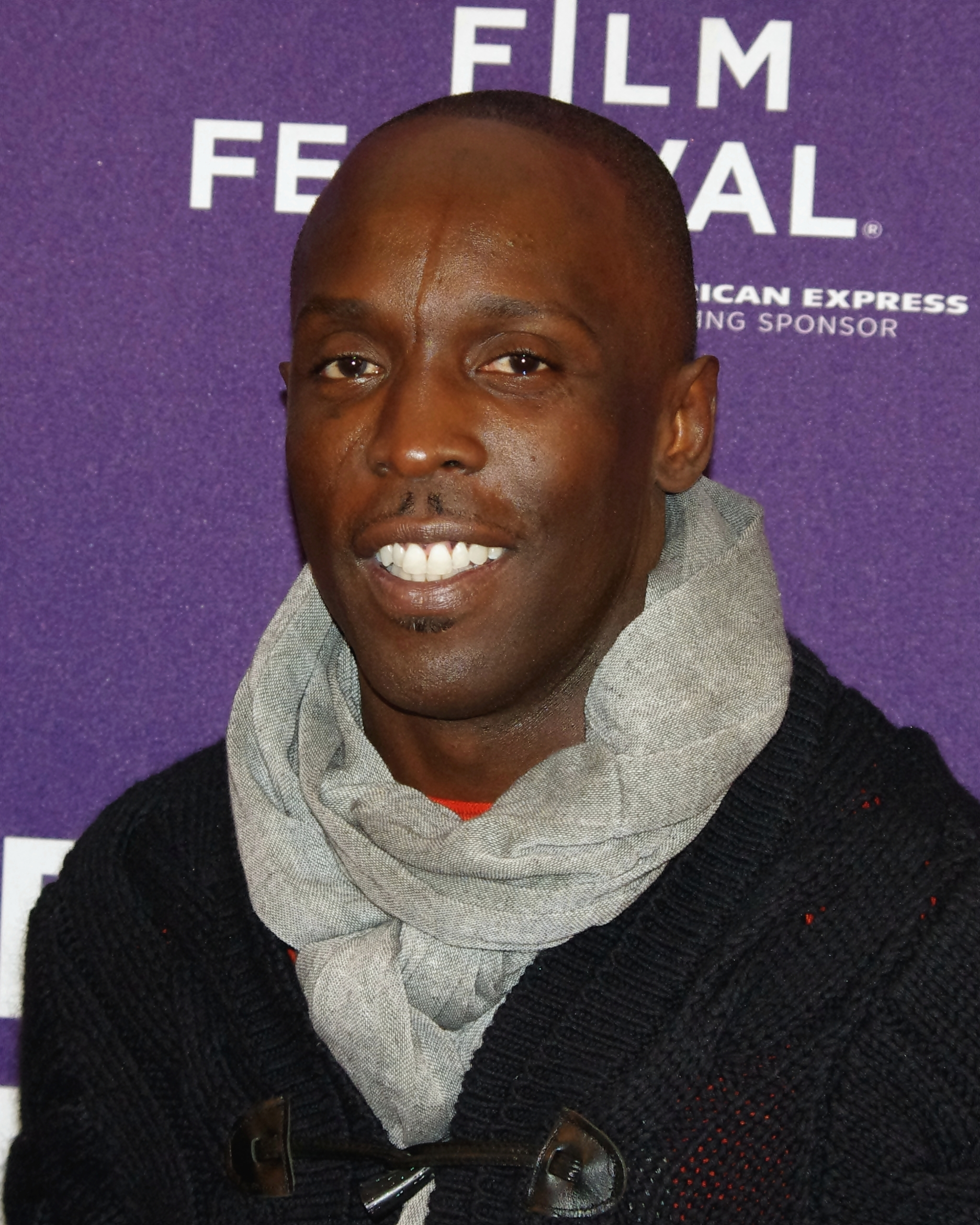
Michael K. Williams, Best Supporting Actor in a Drama Series winner

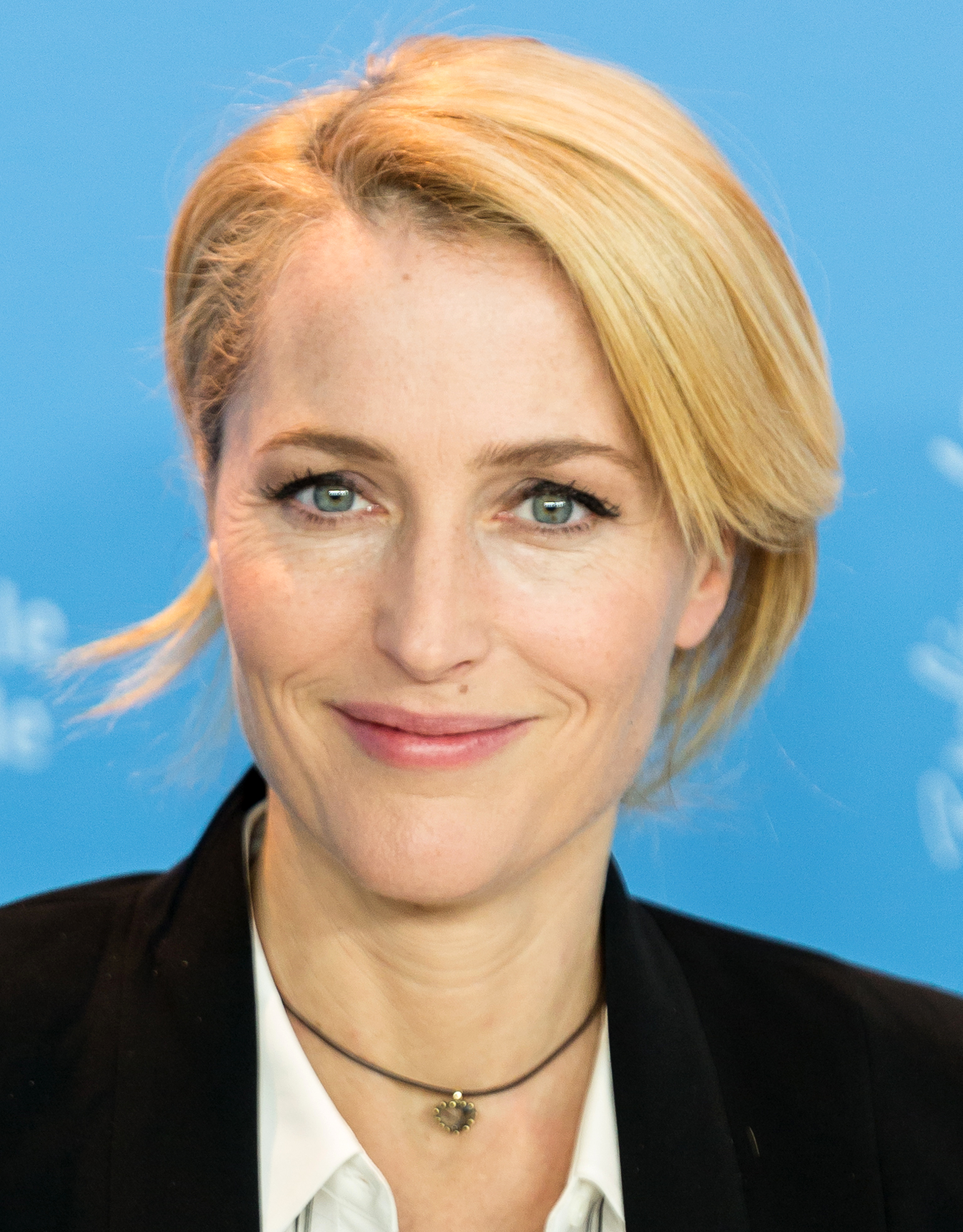
Gillian Anderson, Best Supporting Actress in a Drama Series winner

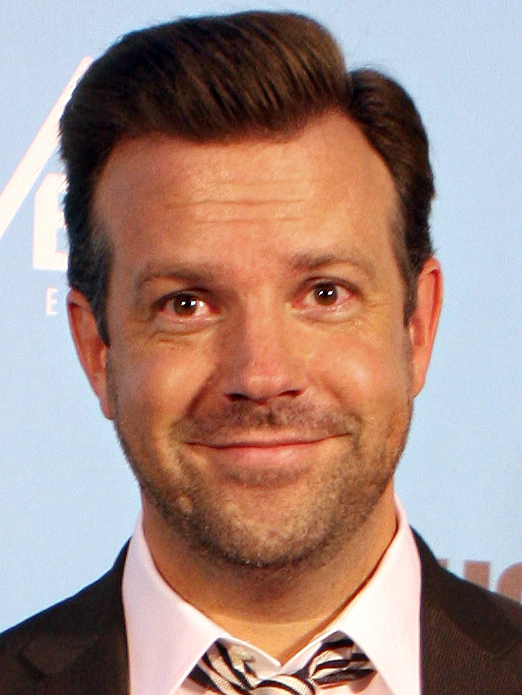
Jason Sudeikis, Best Actor in a Comedy Series winner

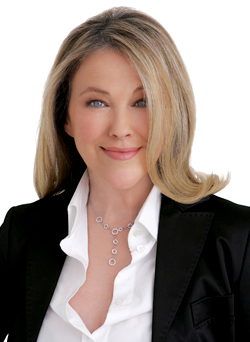
Catherine O'Hara, Best Actress in a Comedy Series winner

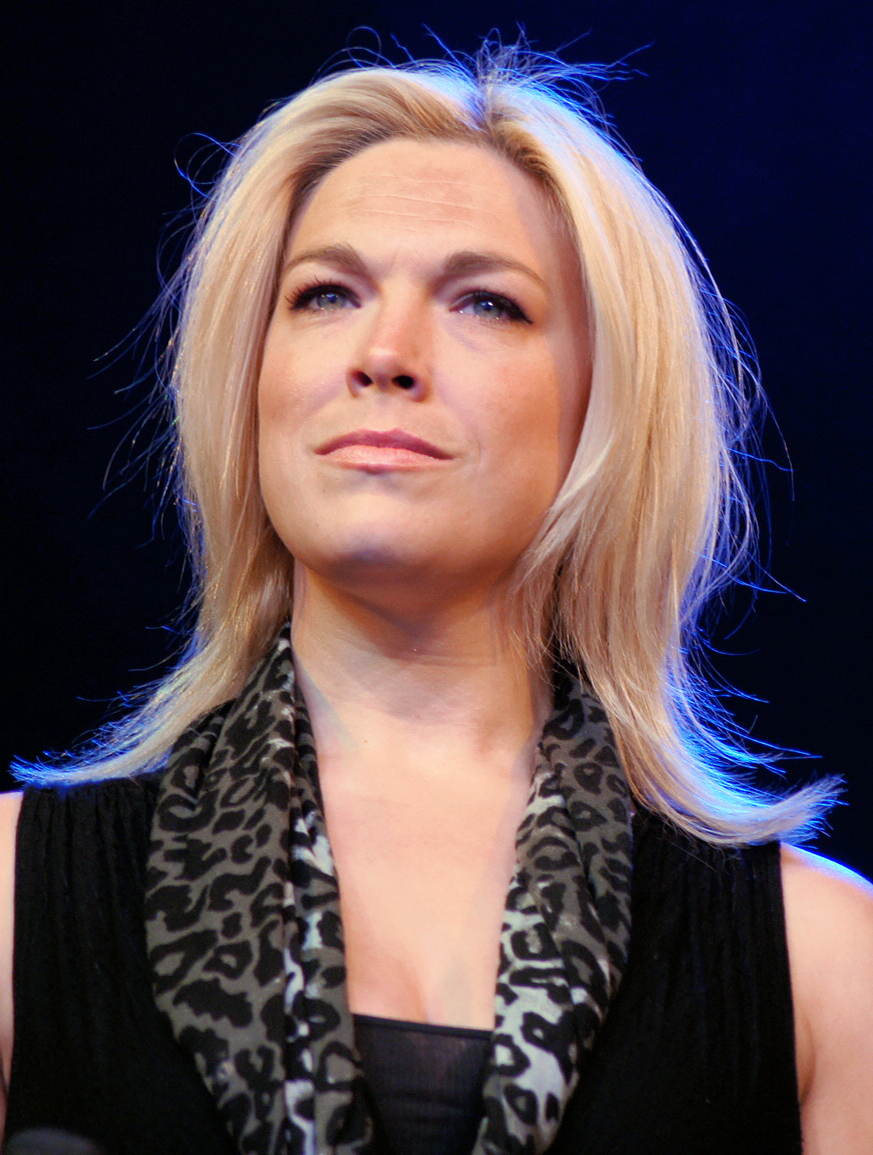
Hannah Waddingham, Best Supporting Actress in a Comedy Series winner

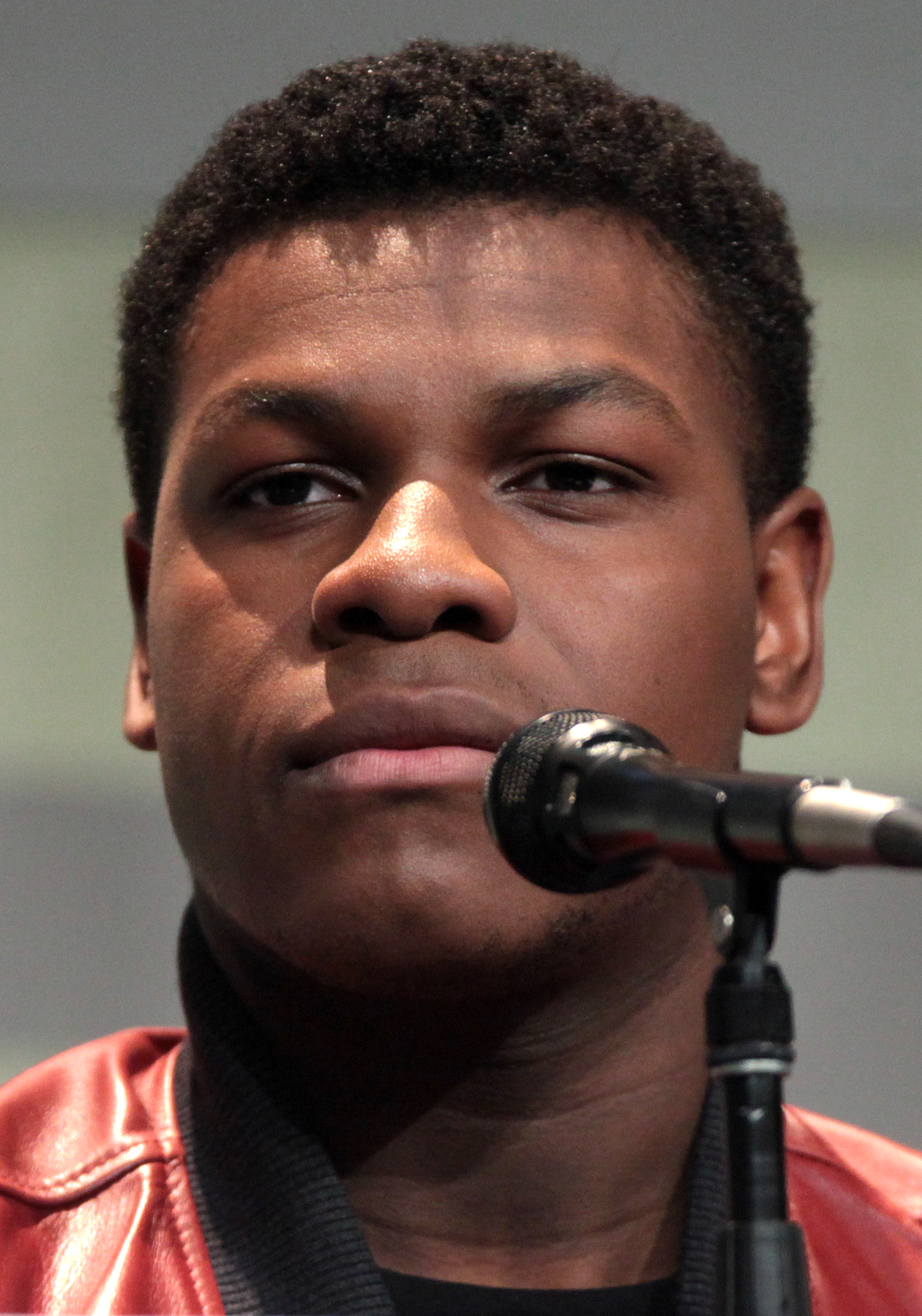
John Boyega, Best Actor in a Limited Series or Movie Made for Television winner

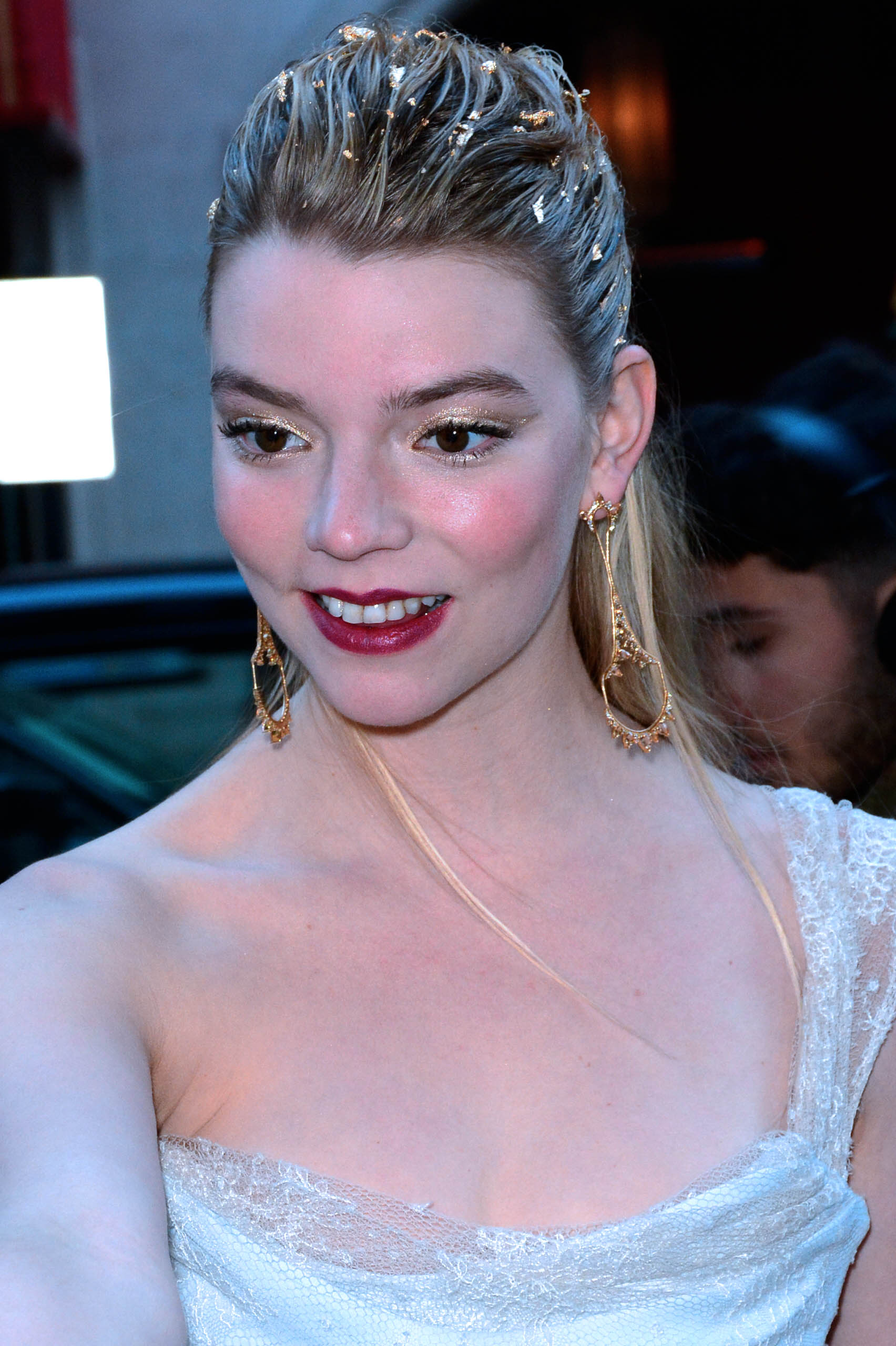
Anya Taylor-Joy, Best Actress in a Limited Series or Movie Made for Television winner

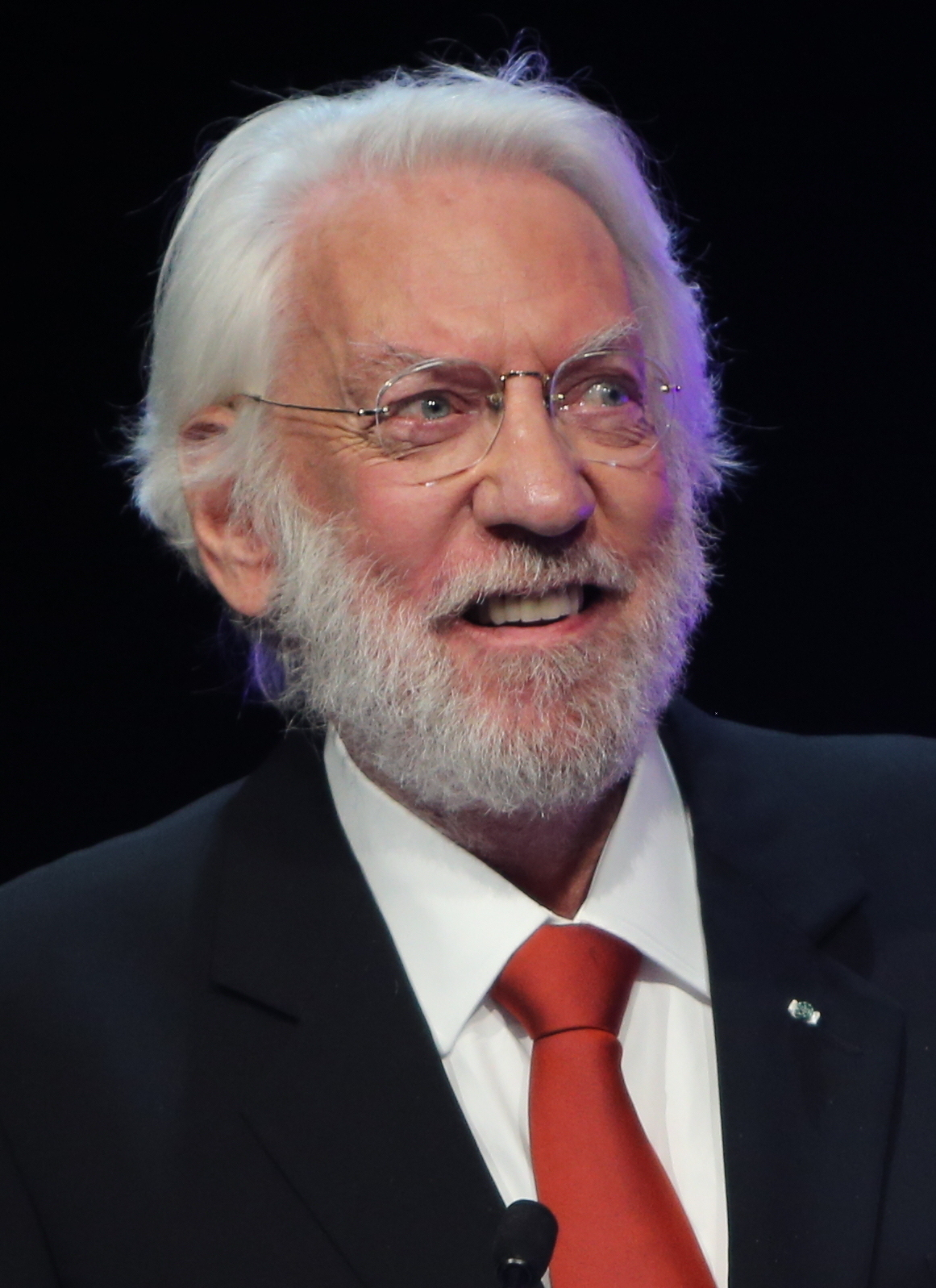
Donald Sutherland, Best Supporting Actor in a Limited Series or Movie Made for Television winner

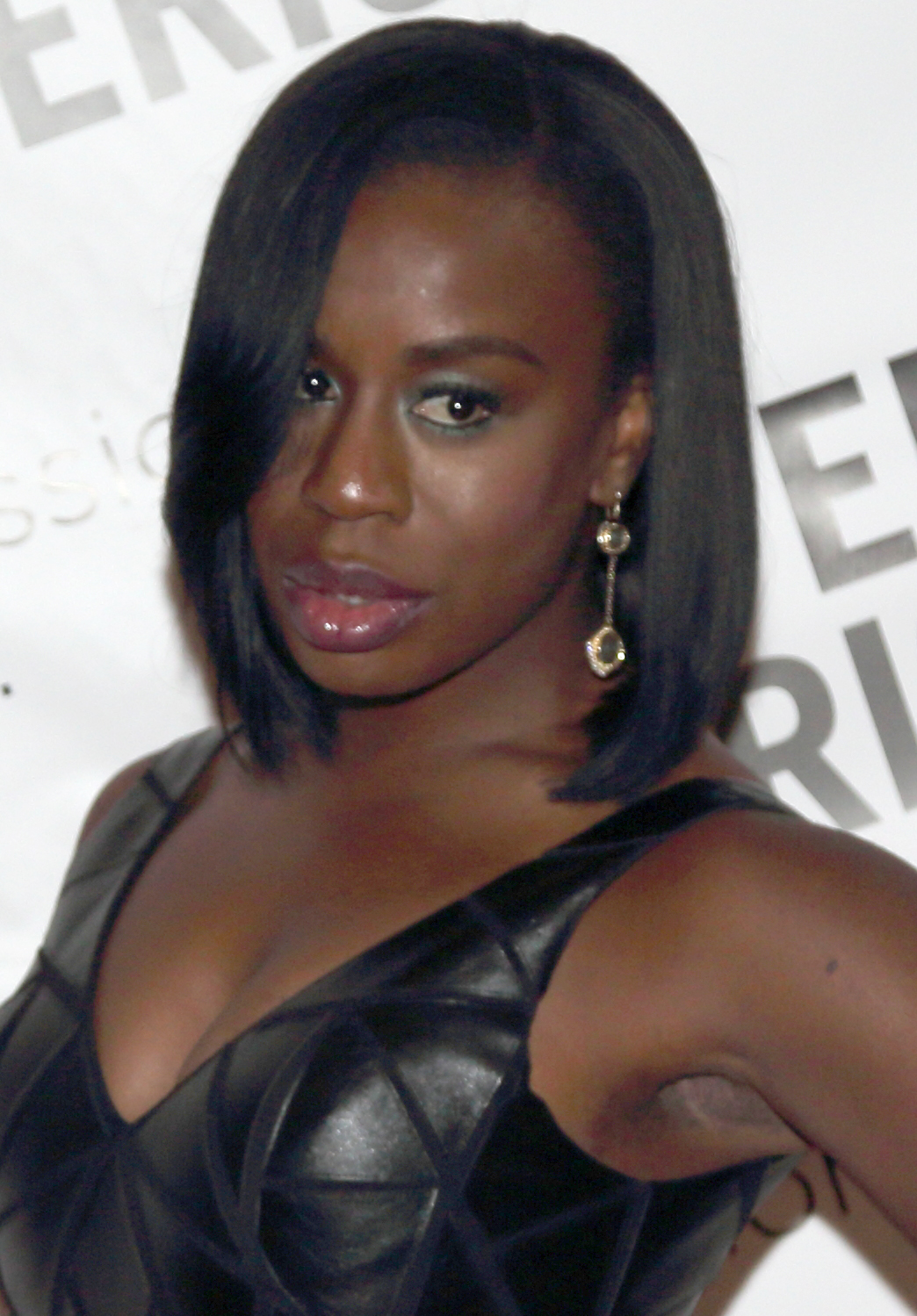
Uzo Aduba, Best Supporting Actress in a Limited Series or Movie Made for Television winner

Best Drama Series: The Crown (Netflix); Better Call Saul (AMC); The Good Fight (CBS All Access); Lovecraft Country (HBO) (Note: Won Best Horror Series at the 1st Critics' Choice Super Awards); The Mandalorian (Disney+) (Note: Won Best Science Fiction/Fantasy Series at the 1st Critics' Choice Super Awards); Ozark (Netflix); Perry Mason (HBO); This Is Us (NBC)
Best Actor in a Drama Series: Josh O'Connor – The Crown as Prince Charles (Netflix); Jason Bateman – Ozark as Martin "Marty" Byrde (Netflix); Sterling K. Brown – This Is Us as Randall Pearson (NBC); Jonathan Majors – Lovecraft Country as Atticus "Tic" Freeman (HBO) (Note: Nominated for Best Actor in a Horror Series at the 1st Critics' Choice Super Awards); Bob Odenkirk – Better Call Saul as Jimmy McGill / Saul Goodman (AMC); Matthew Rhys – Perry Mason as Perry Mason (HBO)	Best Actress in a Drama Series: Emma Corrin – The Crown as Princess Diana (Netflix); Christine Baranski – The Good Fight as Diane Lockhart (CBS All Access); Olivia Colman – The Crown as Queen Elizabeth II (Netflix); Claire Danes – Homeland as Carrie Mathison (Showtime); Laura Linney – Ozark as Wendy Byrde (Netflix); Jurnee Smollett – Lovecraft Country as Letitia "Leti" Lewis (HBO) (Note: Won Best Actress in a Horror Series at the 1st Critics' Choice Super Awards)
Best Supporting Actor in a Drama Series: Michael K. Williams – Lovecraft Country as Montrose Freeman (HBO); Jonathan Banks – Better Call Saul as Mike Ehrmantraut (AMC); Justin Hartley – This Is Us as Kevin Pearson (NBC); John Lithgow – Perry Mason as Elias Birchard "E. B." Jonathan (HBO); Tobias Menzies – The Crown as Prince Philip (Netflix); Tom Pelphrey – Ozark as Ben Davis (Netflix)	Best Supporting Actress in a Drama Series: Gillian Anderson – The Crown as Margaret Thatcher (Netflix); Cynthia Erivo – The Outsider as Holly Gibney (HBO) (Note: Nominated for Best Actress in a Horror Series at the 1st Critics' Choice Super Awards); Julia Garner – Ozark as Ruth Langmore (Netflix); Janet McTeer – Ozark as Helen Pierce (Netflix); Wunmi Mosaku – Lovecraft Country as Ruby Baptiste (HBO); Rhea Seehorn – Better Call Saul as Kim Wexler (AMC)
Best Comedy Series: Ted Lasso (Apple TV+); Better Things (FX); The Flight Attendant (HBO Max); Mom (CBS); PEN15 (Hulu); Ramy (Hulu); Schitt's Creek (Pop); What We Do in the Shadows (FX) (Note: Nominated for Best Science Fiction/Fantasy Series at the 1st Critics' Choice Super Awards)
Best Actor in a Comedy Series: Jason Sudeikis – Ted Lasso as Ted Lasso (Apple TV+); Hank Azaria – Brockmire as Jim Brockmire (IFC); Matt Berry – What We Do in the Shadows as Laszlo Cravensworth (FX); Nicholas Hoult – The Great as Peter III (Hulu); Eugene Levy – Schitt's Creek as Johnny Rose (Pop); Ramy Youssef – Ramy as Ramy Hassan (Hulu)	Best Actress in a Comedy Series: Catherine O'Hara – Schitt's Creek as Moira Rose (Pop); Pamela Adlon – Better Things as Sam Fox (FX); Christina Applegate – Dead to Me as Jen Harding (Netflix); Kaley Cuoco – The Flight Attendant as Cassie Bowden (HBO Max); Natasia Demetriou – What We Do in the Shadows as Nadja (FX) (Note: Won Best Actress in a Science Fiction/Fantasy Series at the 1st Critics' Choice Super Awards); Issa Rae – Insecure as Issa Dee (HBO)
Best Supporting Actor in a Comedy Series: Dan Levy – Schitt's Creek as David Rose (Pop); William Fichtner – Mom as Adam Janikowski (CBS); Harvey Guillén – What We Do in the Shadows as Guillermo de la Cruz (FX); Alex Newell – Zoey's Extraordinary Playlist as Mo (NBC); Mark Proksch – What We Do in the Shadows as Colin Robinson (FX); Andrew Rannells – Black Monday as Blair Pfaff (Showtime)	Best Supporting Actress in a Comedy Series: Hannah Waddingham – Ted Lasso as Rebecca Welton (Apple TV+); Lecy Goranson – The Conners as Becky Conner (ABC); Rita Moreno – One Day at a Time as Lydia Riera (Pop); Annie Murphy – Schitt's Creek as Alexis Rose (Pop); Ashley Park – Emily in Paris as Mindy Chen (Netflix); Jaime Pressly – Mom as Jill Kendall (CBS)
Best Limited Series: The Queen's Gambit (Netflix); I May Destroy You (HBO); Mrs. America (FX on Hulu); Normal People (Hulu); The Plot Against America (HBO); Small Axe (Prime Video); The Undoing (HBO); Unorthodox (Netflix)	Best Movie Made for Television: Hamilton (Disney+); Bad Education (HBO); Between the World and Me (HBO); The Clark Sisters: First Ladies of Gospel (Lifetime); Sylvie's Love (Prime Video); What the Constitution Means to Me (Prime Video)
Best Actor in a Limited Series or Movie Made for Television: John Boyega – Small Axe as Leroy Logan (Prime Video); Hugh Grant – The Undoing as Jonathan Fraser (HBO); Paul Mescal – Normal People as Connell Waldron (Hulu); Chris Rock – Fargo as Loy Cannon (FX); Mark Ruffalo – I Know This Much Is True as Dominick and Thomas Birdsey (HBO); Morgan Spector – The Plot Against America as Herman Levin (HBO)	Best Actress in a Limited Series or Movie Made for Television: Anya Taylor-Joy – The Queen's Gambit as Beth Harmon (Netflix); Cate Blanchett – Mrs. America as Phyllis Schlafly (FX on Hulu); Michaela Coel – I May Destroy You as Arabella Essiedu (HBO); Daisy Edgar-Jones – Normal People as Marianne Sheridan (Hulu); Shira Haas – Unorthodox as Esther "Esty" Shapiro (Netflix); Tessa Thompson – Sylvie's Love as Sylvie Parker (Prime Video)
Best Supporting Actor in a Limited Series or Movie Made for Television: Donald Sutherland – The Undoing as Franklin Reinhardt (HBO); Daveed Diggs – The Good Lord Bird as Frederick Douglass (Showtime); Joshua Caleb Johnson – The Good Lord Bird as Henry "Onion" Shackleford (Showtime); Dylan McDermott – Hollywood as Ernest "Ernie" West (Netflix); Glynn Turman – Fargo as Doctor Senator (FX); John Turturro – The Plot Against America as Rabbi Lionel Bengelsdorf (HBO)	Best Supporting Actress in a Limited Series or Movie Made for Television: Uzo Aduba – Mrs. America as Shirley Chisholm (FX on Hulu); Betsy Brandt – Soulmates as Caitlin Jones (AMC); Marielle Heller – The Queen's Gambit as Alma Wheatley (Netflix); Margo Martindale – Mrs. America as Bella Abzug (FX on Hulu); Winona Ryder – The Plot Against America as Evelyn Finkel (HBO); Tracey Ullman – Mrs. America as Betty Friedan (FX on Hulu)
Best Talk Show: Late Night with Seth Meyers (NBC); Desus & Mero (Showtime); Full Frontal with Samantha Bee (TBS); The Kelly Clarkson Show (NBC / Syndicated); The Late Show with Stephen Colbert (CBS); Red Table Talk (Facebook Watch)	Best Comedy Special: Jerry Seinfeld: 23 Hours to Kill (Netflix) (TIE); Michelle Buteau: Welcome to Buteaupia (Netflix) (TIE); Fortune Feimster: Sweet & Salty (Netflix); Hannah Gadsby: Douglas (Netflix); Marc Maron: End Times Fun (Netflix); Patton Oswalt: I Love Everything (Netflix)
Best Short Form Series: Better Call Saul: Ethics Training with Kim Wexler (AMC / YouTube); The Andy Cohen Diaries (Quibi); Mapleworth Murders (Quibi); Nikki Fre$h (Quibi); Reno 911! (Quibi); Tooning Out the News (CBS All Access)

== Films with multiple nominations and wins ==
The following twenty-five films received multiple nominations:

Film	Nominations
Mank	12
Minari	10
Ma Rainey's Black Bottom	8
News of the World	7
Da 5 Bloods	6
Nomadland	6
One Night in Miami...	6
Promising Young Woman	6
The Trial of the Chicago 7	6
Sound of Metal	5
Tenet	5
The Father	4
Emma	3
Judas and the Black Messiah	3
The Life Ahead	3
The Midnight Sky	3
Never Rarely Sometimes Always	3
The United States vs. Billie Holiday	3
Borat Subsequent Moviefilm	2
First Cow	2
Hillbilly Elegy	2
Mulan	2
On the Rocks	2
The Personal History of David Copperfield	2
Pieces of a Woman	2

The following five films received multiple awards:

Film	Wins
Nomadland	4
Ma Rainey's Black Bottom	3
Minari	2
Promising Young Woman	2
The Trial of the Chicago 7	2

== Television programs with multiple nominations and wins ==
The following programs received multiple nominations:

Program	Network	Category	Nominations
The Crown	Netflix	Drama	6
Ozark	Netflix	Drama	6
Lovecraft Country	HBO	Drama	5
Mrs. America	FX on Hulu	Limited	5
Schitt's Creek	Pop	Comedy	5
What We Do in the Shadows	FX	Comedy	5
Better Call Saul	AMC	Drama	4
The Plot Against America	HBO	Limited	4
Mom	CBS	Comedy	3
Normal People	Hulu	Limited	3
Perry Mason	HBO	Drama	3
The Queen's Gambit	Netflix	Limited	3
Ted Lasso	Apple TV+	Comedy	3
This Is Us	NBC	Drama	3
The Undoing	HBO	Limited	3
Better Things	FX	Comedy	2
Fargo	FX	Limited	2
The Flight Attendant	HBO Max	Comedy	2
The Good Fight	CBS All Access	Drama	2
The Good Lord Bird	Showtime	Limited	2
I May Destroy You	HBO	Limited	2
Ramy	Hulu	Comedy	2
Small Axe	Prime Video	Limited	2
Sylvie's Love	Prime Video	Movie	2
Unorthodox	Netflix	Limited	2

The following programs received multiple awards:

Program	Network	Category	Wins
The Crown	Netflix	Drama	4
Ted Lasso	Apple TV+	Comedy	3
The Queen's Gambit	Netflix	Limited	2
Schitt's Creek	Pop	Comedy	2

== See also ==
- 1st Critics' Choice Super Awards
- 3rd Critics' Choice Real TV Awards
- 5th Critics' Choice Documentary Awards
