= News of the World (film) =

2020 American western film

- Theatrical release poster
- Directed by: Paul Greengrass
- Screenplay by: Paul Greengrass; Luke Davies
- Based on: News of the World by Paulette Jiles
- Produced by: Gary Goetzman; Gail Mutrux; Gregory Goodman
- Starring: Tom Hanks; Helena Zengel; Michael Angelo Covino; Ray McKinnon; Mare Winningham; Elizabeth Marvel; Fred Hechinger; Bill Camp
- Cinematography: Dariusz Wolski
- Edited by: William Goldenberg
- Music by: James Newton Howard
- Production companies: Universal Pictures; Perfect World Pictures; Playtone; Pretty Pictures
- Distributed by: Universal Pictures (United States); Netflix (International)
- Release date: December 25, 2020
- Running time: 118 minutes
- Country: United States
- Languages: English; Kiowa; German
- Budget: $38 million
- Box office: $12.7 million

News of the World is a 2020 American Western film co-written and directed by Paul Greengrass, based on the 2016 novel of the same name by Paulette Jiles, and starring Tom Hanks and introducing Helena Zengel in her international film debut. The film follows an aging Civil War veteran who must return a young girl who was taken in by the Kiowa, and raised as one of them, to her last remaining family.

News of the World was released theatrically by Universal Pictures in the United States on December 25, 2020, and grossed $12 million. Internationally, the film was released by Netflix in other territories on February 10, 2021. It received positive reviews from critics, who praised the performances of Hanks and Zengel, as well as the cinematography, musical score, and Greengrass's direction. At the 93rd Academy Awards, the film received nominations for Best Original Score, Best Cinematography, Best Production Design, and Best Sound. Zengel received nominations for Best Supporting Actress at the Golden Globes and Screen Actors Guild Awards.

== Plot ==
In 1870, Captain Jefferson Kyle Kidd, a former Confederate officer who served in the 3rd Texas Infantry, makes a meager living traveling from town to town in Texas and reading newspaper stories to local residents for an admission fee of ten cents. After departing Wichita Falls, Kidd comes across an overturned wagon on the road and finds the driver, a black freedman, has been lynched. He also finds a young white girl who only speaks Kiowa, wearing a Kiowa dress and boots. Kidd learns from the girl's paperwork that she is Johanna Leonberger, who had been kidnapped and adopted by Kiowa six years earlier. Union Army troops discovered Johanna while dispersing a Kiowa camp and she was being taken to her living aunt and uncle by the freedman. A passing Union Army patrol instructs Kidd to take the girl to Union officials at an outpost in a town up the road. Kidd has little choice but to acquiesce.

At the town, Kidd is informed that the outpost's Bureau of Indian Affairs representative will be unavailable for three months. Kidd initially plans to leave Johanna in the care of friends Simon and Doris Boudlin, but accepts responsibility for returning the girl to her family in Castroville, some 400 miles away, after she recklessly tries to run away with some Native Americans during a storm. In Dallas, Kidd stops at a local inn run by Ella Gannett, an intimate old acquaintance who he discovers speaks Kiowa, and learns that Johanna's adoptive Native American family was also killed, making her "an orphan twice-over". He also finds out through translation that her Kiowa name is Cicada. After reading the news the next night, Kidd and Johanna are accosted by three ex-Confederate soldiers who want to purchase Johanna from him. Kidd refuses and flees with the girl, but the men pursue him into the wilderness. Despite being outgunned, Kidd kills the men after Johanna points out that the dimes Kidd earned from his work could be used as makeshift ammunition for his shotgun.

On the border of Erath County, Kidd and Johanna are detained by militia led by Farley, a racist cattle baron who took over the county and had all non-white residents expelled. Farley coerces Kidd into reading propaganda that glorifies him to his workers, but Kidd instead reads a story about a disaster in a Pennsylvania coal mine that whips Farley's workers into a rebellious fury. Kidd and Johanna make a run for it in the melee, but are caught by Farley and his henchman. Just as Farley is about to shoot Kidd, Johanna wounds Farley with Kidd's shotgun, and John Calley, one of Farley's henchmen who was inspired by Kidd's words, deals with the other henchman and kills Farley.

As the pair continue their journey, their wagon is wrecked and their horses fatally injured when Kidd loses control on a steep road. Kidd and Johanna proceed on foot. After enduring the heat and a blinding sandstorm, they encounter a traveling group of Kiowa who give Johanna a horse. Saved by that gift, Kidd and Johanna eventually reach the Leonberger farmstead. After speaking with Johanna's Aunt Anna and Uncle Wilhelm, Kidd reluctantly leaves her with them. He continues to San Antonio to visit the grave of his wife Maria, who had died of cholera 5 years before, while he was away serving in the Confederate Army.

As he bids farewell to Maria, Kidd realizes that Johanna has become family to him, and rides back to her and apologizes for leaving her behind. Anna and Wilhelm, though not uncaring, had her tied to a post to prevent Johanna from running away. They permit Johanna to go with Kidd, with whom she is clearly much happier after Kidd had recently learned how to speak Kiowa. Later, Captain Kidd enthusiastically reads the news to an audience in a large hall with Johanna's assistance and Kidd introduces her as his daughter Johanna Kidd.

== Cast ==
- Tom Hanks as Captain Kidd
- Helena Zengel as Johanna
- Michael Angelo Covino as Almay
- Ray McKinnon as Simon Boudlin
- Mare Winningham as Doris Boudlin
- Elizabeth Marvel as Mrs. Gannett
- Fred Hechinger as John Calley
- Bill Camp as Mr. Branholme
- Thomas Francis Murphy as Mr. Farley
- Gabriel Ebert as Benjamin Farley

In addition, Neil Sandilands and Winsome Brown portray Johanna's Uncle Wilhelm and Aunt Anna, respectively.

== Production ==
=== Development and casting ===
In May 2017, Fox 2000 Pictures bought distribution rights to an adaptation of the Paulette Jiles novel with Luke Davies writing the screenplay and Tom Hanks set to star. In February 2019, Paul Greengrass was announced as director. As a result of Disney acquiring Fox 2000's parent company, 21st Century Fox, the film was transferred to Universal Pictures. In August, Helena Zengel, Michael Angelo Covino, and Fred Hechinger were added to the cast, and Thomas Francis Murphy joined in September.

=== Filming ===
Filming commenced on September 2, 2019, in Santa Fe, New Mexico and finished in approximately November 2020. Scenes set in towns and in Dallas, Texas were shot at the western sets of the Bonanza Creek Ranch near the ruins of Bonanza City, New Mexico. Some computer-generated imagery was used to add more buildings.

Kiowa Tribe member Dorothy WhiteHorse coached Zengel in the Kiowa language and other details of Native American life and behavior, while Tribal Chairman Matthew Komalty praised the film's crew for their attention to accuracy.

In November 2020, Netflix bought the international distribution rights to the film (excluding the United States). Helena Zengel dubbed herself in the Italian, German, French and Spanish versions; the dubbing is limited to the lines she spoke in English.

== Release ==
News of the World was theatrically released by Universal Pictures in the United States on December 25, 2020, which was followed by a Premium video on demand (PVOD) release in the United States on January 15, 2021. It originally was going to be released by Fox 2000 Pictures. In November 2020, it was announced that Netflix had acquired international distribution rights, except for the United States and China, and released it digitally on its streaming service on February 10, 2021. On March 2, 2021, Universal Pictures Home Entertainment officially announced that the release date for News of the World to physical media, including Blu-ray Disc, 4k Ultra HD Blu-ray Disc, and DVD, would be March 23, 2021. In the United States, the film was released on HBO/HBO Max on September 4, 2021.

== Reception ==
=== Box office ===
In the United States, News of the World, released alongside Wonder Woman 1984, Promising Young Woman, and Pinocchio, was projected to gross around $4 million from 1,900 theaters in its opening weekend. The film made $1.05 million on its first day, and went on to debut to $2.3 million, finishing second at the box office behind Wonder Woman 1984; 70% of the audience was over the age of 35. The film fell 25% in its second weekend, grossing $1.7 million, then made $1.24 million in its third weekend.

=== Critical response ===
On the review aggregator website Rotten Tomatoes, 88% of 273 critics' reviews are positive, with an average rating of 7.4/10. The website's consensus reads: "News of the World takes a slow but absorbing ride down a comfortingly familiar Western trail, guided by Tom Hanks in peak paternal mode." On Metacritic, it has a weighted average score of 73 out of 100, based on 45 critics, indicating "generally favorable reviews". Audiences polled by CinemaScore gave the film an average grade of "B+" on an A+ to F scale.

Writing for IndieWire, David Ehrlich gave the film a grade of B and said, "If Greengrass' broadly entertaining (if gallingly relevant) film is a bit too soft and spread thin to hit with the emotional force that it could, so much of its simple power is owed to the grounded nature of the director's approach, which allows these desperate characters to feel as if they're trying to escape the very genre that threatens to define them forever."

A.A. Dowd of The A.V. Club gave the film a "B−" and wrote: "Ultimately, News Of The World lives and dies on the presence of its iconic headliner, on the Hanks of it all. That's the most old-fashioned thing about it: It's a true star vehicle, practically a tribute to his enduring appeal. Yet for as comforting as Hanks is in the role, and for as much as he sells the poignancy of the film's bittersweet final stretch, the film feels almost too built around his signature nobility to ever gain much in the way of actual drama."

Mark Kermode of The Observer awarded the film 4 out of 5 stars and wrote, "Having emerged from news documentaries to become a peerless director of vivid real-life dramas (Bloody Sunday, United 93) and frenetically visceral adventures (The Bourne franchise), Greengrass relishes the opportunity to take a more languorous attitude to character development and location, a quality that seems to have confounded some fans of the director's more urgent fare. Yet I found this a rewarding and entertaining drama, heavy with the weight of the past, yet buoyed up by the possibilities of the future." Tom Gliatto of People named it the fifth best film of the year.

Contrasting views display the comments on the movie by Philipp Emberger, the critic of ORF, the Austrian Broadcasting Corporation: under the title "Helena Zengel Overpowering Tom Hanks", he describes her scenes as the highlights of the film, compared to Tom Hanks's solos that seem "arduously one-dimensional", concluding that "Tom Hanks delivers a lot of forgivingness, besides the Dad-vibes", which makes the film "a quiet and steady Western with elements of road-movie, beautiful pictures of landscapes, a relevant topic, lots of heart, and a star named Helena Zengel." Peter Bradshaw of The Guardian gave the film 2 out of 5 stars, writing that although Hanks's "persona here is equable and easy-going, qualities which are of course necessary to his sympathetic brand identity, he doesn't plausibly change in any dramatic way", and describing the film as a "handsomely shot but stolid and blandly self-satisfied western".

A. O. Scott of The New York Times gave a mixed review, writing that "this isn't a bad movie. The problem is that it's too nice a movie, too careful and compromised, as if its makers didn't trust the audience to handle the real news of the world."

Professor Dr. Myrton Running Wolf gave a negative review, saying that the film's story portrays a narrative that is not representative of the historical context.

=== Accolades ===
Award	Date of ceremony	Category	Recipient(s)	Result	Ref.
AARP's Movies for Grownups Awards	March 28, 2021	Best Actor	Tom Hanks	Nominated	
AARP's Movies for Grownups Awards	March 28, 2021	Best Screenwriter	Paul Greengrass and Luke Davies	Nominated	
Academy Awards	April 25, 2021	Best Cinematography	Dariusz Wolski	Nominated	
Academy Awards	April 25, 2021	Best Original Score	James Newton Howard	Nominated	
Academy Awards	April 25, 2021	Best Production Design	David Crank and Elizabeth Keenan	Nominated	
Academy Awards	April 25, 2021	Best Sound	Oliver Tarney, Mike Prestwood Smith, William Miller, and John Pritchett	Nominated	
American Society of Cinematographers Awards	April 18, 2021	Outstanding Achievement in Cinematography in Theatrical Releases	Dariusz Wolski	Nominated	
Art Directors Guild Awards	April 10, 2021	Excellence in Production Design for a Period Film	David Crank	Nominated	
British Academy Film Awards	April 11, 2021	Best Cinematography	Dariusz Wolski	Nominated	
British Academy Film Awards	April 11, 2021	Best Original Music	James Newton Howard	Nominated	
British Academy Film Awards	April 11, 2021	Best Production Design	David Crank and Elizabeth Keenan	Nominated	
British Academy Film Awards	April 11, 2021	Best Sound	Michael Fentum, William Miller, Mike Prestwood Smith, John Pritchett, and Oliver Tarney	Nominated	
Cinema Audio Society Awards	April 17, 2021	Outstanding Achievement in Sound Mixing for a Motion Picture – Live Action	John Patrick Pritchett, Mike Prestwood Smith, William Miller, Shawn Murphy, Mark DeSimone, and Adam Fil Méndez	Nominated	
Critics' Choice Awards	March 7, 2021	Best Picture	News of the World	Nominated	
Critics' Choice Awards	March 7, 2021	Best Actor	Tom Hanks	Nominated	
Critics' Choice Awards	March 7, 2021	Best Young Actor/Actress	Helena Zengel	Nominated	
Critics' Choice Awards	March 7, 2021	Best Adapted Screenplay	Luke Davies and Paul Greengrass	Nominated	
Critics' Choice Awards	March 7, 2021	Best Cinematography	Dariusz Wolski	Nominated	
Critics' Choice Awards	March 7, 2021	Best Production Design	David Crank and Elizabeth Keenan	Nominated	
Critics' Choice Awards	March 7, 2021	Best Score	James Newton Howard	Nominated	
Golden Globe Awards	February 28, 2021	Best Supporting Actress – Motion Picture	Helena Zengel	Nominated	
Golden Globe Awards	February 28, 2021	Best Original Score	James Newton Howard	Nominated	
Hollywood Critics Association Awards	March 5, 2021	Best Cinematography	Dariusz Wolski	Nominated	
Hollywood Critics Association Awards	March 5, 2021	Best Score	James Newton Howard	Nominated	
Hollywood Music in Media Awards	January 27, 2021	Best Original Score in a Feature Film	James Newton Howard	Won	
Motion Picture Sound Editors Golden Reel Awards	April 16, 2021	Outstanding Achievement in Sound Editing – Feature Underscore	Arabella Winter, David Olson, and Jim Weidman	Nominated	
Motion Picture Sound Editors Golden Reel Awards	April 16, 2021	Outstanding Achievement in Sound Editing – Feature Dialogue/ADR	Oliver Tarney, Rachael Tate and Anna MacKenzie	Nominated	
Motion Picture Sound Editors Golden Reel Awards	April 16, 2021	Outstanding Achievement in Sound Editing – Feature Effects/Foley	Oliver Tarney, Mike Fentum, Kevin Penney, Dawn Gough, Hugo Adams, Sue Harding, Andrea King, and Oliver Ferris	Nominated	
Satellite Awards	February 15, 2021	Best Supporting Actress – Motion Picture	Helena Zengel	Nominated	
Satellite Awards	February 15, 2021	Best Adapted Screenplay	Luke Davies and Paul Greengrass	Nominated	
Satellite Awards	February 15, 2021	Best Cinematography	Dariusz Wolski	Nominated	
Satellite Awards	February 15, 2021	Best Original Score	James Newton Howard	Nominated	
Screen Actors Guild Awards	April 4, 2021	Outstanding Performance by a Female Actor in a Supporting Role	Helena Zengel	Nominated	
Screen Actors Guild Awards	April 4, 2021	Outstanding Performance by a Stunt Ensemble in a Motion Picture	News of the World	Nominated	
Set Decorators Society of America Awards	March 31, 2021	Best Achievement in Décor/Design of a Period Feature Film	Elizabeth Keenan and David Crank	Nominated	
Visual Effects Society Awards	April 6, 2021	Outstanding Supporting Visual Effects in a Photoreal Feature	Roni Rodrigues, Dayaliyah Lopez, Ian Fellows, Andrew Morley, and Brandon K. McLaughlin	Nominated	
Writers Guild of America Awards	March 21, 2021	Best Adapted Screenplay	Luke Davies and Paul Greengrass	Nominated	

== See also ==
- Olive Oatman
