= David Crank =

Production designer and art director in film

- Education: College of William & Mary (BA); Carnegie Mellon University (MFA)
- Occupation(s): Production designer, Art designer
- Years active: 1990-present

David Crank is an American production designer and art director. His production designer credits include Rian Johnson's Knives Out and Paul Greengrass's News of the World (for which he nabbed an Academy Award nomination for Best Production Design with set decorator, Elizabeth Keenan at the 93rd Academy Awards, as well as nominations for a BAFTA Award and Critics' Choice Movie Awards in the same category), plus art director credits on various films including Steven Spielberg's Lincoln, Paul Thomas Anderson's There Will Be Blood and The Master, and Water for Elephants.

== Education and personal life ==
Crank grew up in Richmond, Virginia and graduated from William and Mary with a degree in studio art in 1982. He also received a Theatre Design MFA degree from Carnegie-Mellon.

== Professional life ==
Crank first began as a set designer in Richmond's local theaters and then started working in film as a set painter around 1990. He was the Art Director on three of Terrence Malick's films, including The New World (2005) and The Tree of Life (2011). Crank was on the production team that won the 2012 Satellite Award for Best Art Direction and Production Design for Lincoln (and was also nominated that same year for The Master). Crank's production design work on Knives Out was integral to the film's world, including the fact that he turned different locations into the film's main setting, the mansion of mystery author Harlan Thrombey.

In 2011, William & Mary’s Muscarelle Museum of Art presented Crank with The Cheek Medal, a national award for outstanding presentation of the arts. In addition to his Oscar and BAFTA Film Award nods, Crank was nominated for an Art Directors Guild Award for Excellence in Production Design for his work on News of the World.

== Filmography ==
=== As production designer ===
Year	Title	Director	Notes
1998	Major League: Back to the Minors	John Warren	
1999	Wayward Son	Randall Harris	
2008	Lake City	Perry Moore	
2012	The Master	Paul Thomas Anderson	
2013	The Double	Richard Ayoade	
2014	Inherent Vice	Paul Thomas Anderson	
2015	Concussion	Peter Landesman	
2017	Mark Felt: The Man Who Brought Down the White House	Peter Landesman	
2019	Knives Out	Rian Johnson	
2020	Greyhound	Aaron Schneider	
2020	The Book of Vision	Carlo S. Hintermann	
2020	News of the World	Paul Greengrass	
2022	Raymond & Ray	Rodrigo García	
2025	The Lost Bus	Paul Greengrass	
