= Paulette Jiles =

American writer (1943–2025)

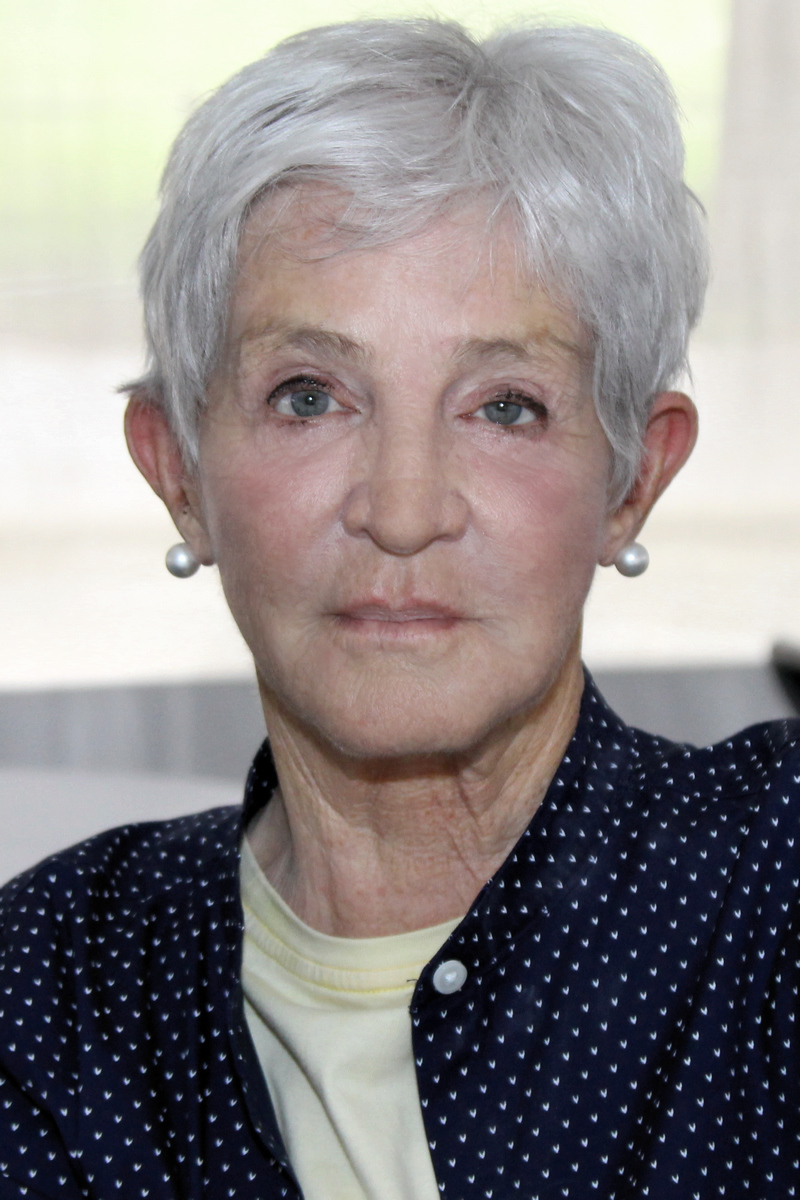
- Jiles in 2017
- Born: Paulette Kay Jiles; April 4, 1943; Salem, Missouri, U.S.
- Died: July 8, 2025 (aged 82); San Antonio, Texas, U.S.
- Education: University of Missouri–Kansas City
- Occupations: Poet; memoirist; novelist
- Spouse: Jim Johnson (divorced)
- Writing career
- Notable work: News of the World (2016)
- Notable awards: Governor General's Award (1984); Pat Lowther Award (1985); Gerald Lampert Award (1985)

Paulette Kay Jiles (also known as Paulette K. Jiles, Paulette Jiles-Johnson; April 4, 1943 – July 8, 2025) was an American poet, memoirist and novelist.

== Background ==
Paulette Kay Jiles was born in 1943 in Salem, Missouri. She attended college at the University of Missouri–Kansas City, graduating in 1968 with a major in Romance Languages. Jiles moved to Toronto, Canada in 1969, where she worked for the Canadian Broadcasting Corporation and, subsequently, helped set up native-language FM radio stations with indigenous peoples in the far north of Ontario and Quebec for the next 10 years. In the process, she learned the Ojibwe language spoken by the Anishinaabeg peoples in Ontario and elsewhere.

After marrying Jim Johnson, she moved with him to San Antonio in 1991. After several years of travel, including living in Mexico, the couple resettled in San Antonio in 1995, buying a house in the historical district. After her divorce in 2003, Jiles lived on a 36-acre (14.6 ha) ranch near Utopia, Texas, about 80 miles (128 km) west of San Antonio.

In June 2025, Jiles announced that she had been diagnosed with non-alcoholic fatty liver disease. She died at a San Antonio hospital on July 8, 2025, at the age of 82.

== Writing career ==
Her 2016 novel News of the World was a finalist for the National Book Award for Fiction.

== Selected bibliography ==
- Waterloo Express (1973)
- Celestial Navigation (1984, winner of the 1984 Governor General's Award for English Poetry, the Pat Lowther Award, and the Gerald Lampert Award)
- The Golden Hawks (Where We Live) (1985)
- Sitting in the Club Car Drinking Rum and Karma Kola (1986, nominated for the Ethel Wilson Fiction Prize)
- The Late Great Human Road Show (1986, nominated for the Books in Canada First Novel Award)
- The Jesse James Poems (1988)
- Blackwater (1988)
- Song to the Rising Sun (1989)
- Cousins (1992)
- Flying Lesson: Selected Poems (1995)
- North Spirit: Sojourns Among the Cree and Ojibway Nations and Their Star Maps (1995)
- Enemy Women (2002, winner of the Rogers Writers' Trust Fiction Prize)
- Stormy Weather (2007)
- The Color of Lightning (2009)
- Lighthouse Island (2013)
- News of the World (2016)
- Simon the Fiddler (2020)
- Chenneville: A Novel of Murder, Loss, and Vengeance (2023)
