= Elizabeth Keenan =

American set decorator

- Occupation: Set decorator

Elizabeth Keenan is an American set decorator. She was nominated for an Academy Award in the category Best Production Design for the film News of the World.

== Selected filmography ==
- News of the World (2020; co-nominated with David Crank)
