= News of the World (novel) =

2016 novel by Paulette Jiles

- First edition
- Author: Paulette Jiles
- Audio read by: Grover Gardner
- Genre: Western
- Set in: Texas, Old West
- Publisher: William Morrow
- Publication date: 2016
- Publication place: United States
- Pages: 212
- ISBN: 978-0-06-240921-8
- LC Class: PR9199.3.J54
- Preceded by: Lighthouse Island
- Followed by: Simon the Fiddler
- Website: www.newsoftheworldbook.com

News of the World is a 2016 American Western novel by Paulette Jiles.

== Plot ==
The book opens in 1870 on the wild border between Texas and Indian Territory, where a 10-year-old girl has been released after four years of captivity. Kiowa raiders had killed her family and taken her hostage, eventually raising her as one of their own with the Kiowa name Cicada. The girl is entrusted to freedman Britt Johnson, who then hands her over to his acquaintance, 71-year-old Captain Jefferson Kyle Kidd, a veteran of the War of 1812 and the Mexican-American War. Kidd agrees to take the girl to Castroville, Texas, where her aunt and uncle live. Captain Kidd makes his living as a news reader, traveling between towns and charging a dime per person to read aloud from newspapers. His profession pays little, and Kidd is also struggling with family problems: his daughters are still living in war-torn Georgia, and he has yet to reclaim land in Texas that once belonged to his late wife, the daughter of Spanish landowners.

Captain Kidd purchases an old traveling wagon and sets off with the girl. At first, he finds himself at a loss as to how to deal with the girl's semi-wild state. She considers herself to be Kiowa, and views her ordeal as a second kidnapping, refusing to cooperate with the Captain and even nearly getting herself killed when she runs away and provokes a band of wandering Native Americans. She speaks no English, and one of Capt. Kidd's early triumphs in their relationship is merely learning her original name: Johanna. As they journey south, the Captain continues to read the news when they reach new towns, earning enough to sustain their forward progress. He is careful to avoid local stories, particularly about the rivalry between the political factions headed by Edmund J. Davis and Andrew Jackson Hamilton because he knows it will provoke arguments in his audience. Likewise, he is also careful on the road, taking great pains not to call attention to himself or Johanna.

In Dallas, Captain Kidd is approached after his reading by a man named Almay, who had been following Kidd and Johanna for some time. Almay is accompanied by two Caddo men, and he offers to buy Johanna. Correctly guessing that Almay intends to sell Johanna as a prostitute, Capt. Kidd sets up a meeting for the next morning, and then flees during the night with Johanna. Almay and his Caddo henchmen eventually catch up with the Captain and Johanna, and ambush them on the road. The Captain, with Johanna's help, is able to wound the Caddo men, and kill Almay, by loading his shotgun with shells packed with dimes from his last reading.

Continuing on, Captain Kidd encounters a band of pro-Hamilton militants manning a checkpoint near a ferry crossing. One of them, a young man named John Calley, extorts money from the Captain to let him pass, only to return it later when his reading is canceled following a fistfight between Davis and Hamilton men. The Captain and Johanna leave that night, only to run into more trouble in the next town when a gang of drunken hoods, the Horrell brothers, threaten Captain Kidd and insist that he praise them at his next reading. Kidd leaves town without doing a reading, and he and Johanna are forced to hide when Kiowa warriors stumble across their hiding place. To Kidd's relief, Johanna chooses not to alert them, and the warriors depart.

After putting together a reading in Fredericksburg to raise enough money for them to finish the trip, the Captain delivers Johanna to her relatives. At a party to celebrate her return, a local man warns him not to leave Johanna, claiming that her aunt and uncle are abusive and greedy. Captain Kidd returns to his home in San Antonio, but eventually decides to return and check on Johanna. After realizing that her relatives are treating her like a slave, he takes her with him and formally adopts her into his family. His daughters eventually move to San Antonio, and reclaim their right to their ancestral land and mansion. The Captain settles into retirement as a printer and writer while Johanna grows into a mature young woman, albeit never completely shedding her Kiowa ways. John Calley visits, and upon earning enough money as a cattleman, asks for and receives Johanna's hand in marriage, with the Captain giving her his prized gold watch as a reminder of the bond forged between them.

== Influences ==
Jiles wrote that much of her account of Johanna's alienation is based on Scott Zesch's The Captured. The character of Captain Kidd is drawn from a friend's distant relation, Captain Adolphus Caesar Kydd. Kidd made his first appearance in Jiles' 2010 novel The Color of Lightning. Jiles has spun off one of the characters from News of the World in her forthcoming novel Simon the Fiddler.

The story also has some similarities to those of Cynthia Ann Parker and Matilda Lockhart.

== Film adaptation ==
Fox 2000 Pictures was reported to be in a "bidding battle" over the rights to News of the World, which it acquired in 2017. After the acquisition of Fox by Disney, the film was moved to Universal Pictures. It stars Tom Hanks as Captain Kidd and Helena Zengel as Johanna. The screenplay was rewritten by the film's director Paul Greengrass after an original version by Luke Davies.

== See also ==
- Olive Oatman
