= Avatar (franchise) =

Disney media franchise

- Logo used since 2018
- Created by: James Cameron
- Original work: Avatar (2009)
- Owners: 20th Century Studios; Lightstorm Entertainment
- Years: 2009–present

Print publications
- Graphic novel: Avatar: The High Ground (2022–2023)

Films and television
- Films: Avatar (2009); Avatar: The Way of Water (2022); Avatar: Fire and Ash (2025); Avatar 4 (2029); Avatar 5 (2031)

Games
- Video games: Avatar: The Game (2009); Avatar: Pandora Rising (2020); Avatar: Frontiers of Pandora (2023)

Audio
- Soundtracks: Avatar (2009); Avatar: The Way of Water (2022); Avatar: Frontiers of Pandora (2023); Avatar: Fire and Ash (2025)
- Original music: I See You; The Songcord; Nothing Is Lost; The Future and The Past; Dream as One

Miscellaneous
- Toy: Lego Avatar
- Theme park attractions: Avatar Flight of Passage (2017); Na'vi River Journey (2017)

Official website
- avatar.com

Avatar is an American epic science fiction media franchise created by James Cameron, which began with the 2009 film Avatar. Produced by Lightstorm Entertainment and distributed by 20th Century Studios, it consists of associated merchandise, video games, and theme park attractions.

== Premise ==
The films of the Avatar franchise are set in the mid-22nd century on Pandora, a lush habitable moon of a gas giant in the Alpha Centauri star system. Their central conflict is between the indigenous Na'vi led by Jake Sully and Neytiri, and humans led by Colonel Miles Quaritch from the Resources Development Administration (RDA), a megacorp that has arrived on Pandora to colonize and pillage it for its natural resources. The title of the series refers to a genetically engineered Na'vi body remotely operated by humans via brain–computer interface to interact with the Na'vi on Pandora.

The first installment, Avatar, was released on December 18, 2009, and is the highest grossing motion picture without inflation adjustments. The planned sequel series was announced by 20th Century Fox on December 11, 2009, one week before Avatar was released to theaters. 20th Century Fox confirmed the series on January 15, 2010.

After extensive delays, the franchise’s second installment, subtitled The Way of Water, was released on December 16, 2022.

The third installment, subtitled Fire and Ash, was released on December 19, 2025.

Like the original film, the two released sequels and two planned sequels (Way of Water, Fire and Ash, 4, and 5) have "fully encapsulated" stand-alone plots that "come to their own conclusions". The four films have an overarching meta-narrative story arc that connects them to create a large interconnected saga. Cameron described the sequels as "a natural extension of all the themes, and the characters, and the spiritual undercurrents" of the first film.

The Avatar franchise is one of the most expensive franchises undertaken, with the combined budget of the first film and its four sequels estimated at $1 billion. The franchise has grossed more than $6.7 billion worldwide. The first two films received largely positive critical reviews, while the third film received mixed-to-positive reviews.

== Films ==
Avatar films
Film	U.S. release date	Directed by	Screenplay by	Story by	Produced by	Status
Avatar	December 18, 2009	James Cameron	James Cameron	James Cameron	James Cameron & Jon Landau	Released
Avatar: The Way of Water	December 16, 2022	James Cameron	James Cameron, Rick Jaffa & Amanda Silver	James Cameron, Rick Jaffa, Amanda Silver, Josh Friedman & Shane Salerno	James Cameron & Jon Landau	Released
Avatar: Fire and Ash	December 19, 2025	James Cameron	James Cameron, Rick Jaffa & Amanda Silver	James Cameron, Rick Jaffa, Amanda Silver, Josh Friedman & Shane Salerno	James Cameron & Jon Landau	Released
Avatar 4	December 21, 2029	James Cameron	James Cameron & Josh Friedman	James Cameron, Rick Jaffa, Amanda Silver, Josh Friedman & Shane Salerno	James Cameron & Rae Sanchini	In development
Avatar 5	December 19, 2031	James Cameron	James Cameron & Shane Salerno	James Cameron, Rick Jaffa, Amanda Silver, Josh Friedman & Shane Salerno	James Cameron & Rae Sanchini	In development

=== Avatar (2009) ===
Avatar was written and directed by James Cameron. The cast includes Sam Worthington, Zoe Saldaña, Sigourney Weaver, Michelle Rodriguez, Stephen Lang, Joel David Moore, Giovanni Ribisi, CCH Pounder, Dileep Rao, Matt Gerald, Laz Alonso, and Wes Studi, and is set in the year 2154.

The story focuses on an epic conflict on Pandora, an inhabited Earth-sized moon of Polyphemus, one of three gas giants orbiting Alpha Centauri A. On Pandora, human colonists and the sentient humanoid indigenous inhabitants of Pandora, the Na'vi, engage in a war over the planet's resources (such as unobtanium) and the latter's continued existence. The film's title refers to the remotely controlled, genetically engineered human-Na'vi bodies used by the film's human characters to interact with the locals. The protagonist, Jake Sully, is a paraplegic young man who travels to Pandora from Earth. Assisting the corporate monolith known as the Resources Development Administration (RDA), he is given an avatar which he uses to interact with the story's heroine, Neytiri, as well as her clan known as the Omatikaya.

=== Avatar: The Way of Water (2022) ===
Avatar: The Way of Water was written and directed by James Cameron, The cast includes Sam Worthington, Zoë Saldaña, Joel David Moore, Sigourney Weaver, CCH Pounder, Stephen Lang, Giovanni Ribisi, Kate Winslet, Cliff Curtis, Trinity Bliss, Jamie Flatters, Britain Dalton, and Jack Champion, and is set 16 years after the first film in the year 2170.

The Way of Water focuses on the return of the RDA, which prompts Jake's family to seek refuge in the water regions of Pandora in an effort to keep one another safe. Cameron said in an interview that while the first film was about the "awe and wonder", the sequel focuses more on the characters. The film was originally planned for a December 2014 release, but was delayed several times and released on December 16, 2022. Production began in August 2017. It wrapped in September 2020.

=== Avatar: Fire and Ash (2025) ===
Avatar: Fire and Ash was written and directed by James Cameron, The cast includes Sam Worthington, Zoë Saldaña, Joel David Moore, Sigourney Weaver, CCH Pounder, Stephen Lang, Giovanni Ribisi, Kate Winslet, Cliff Curtis, Trinity Bliss, Britain Dalton, Jack Champion, David Thewlis, and Oona Chaplin, and is set shortly after the second film.

Fire and Ash focuses on the continuing conflict between the Na'vi and the RDA with Jake's family struggling to prevent more casualties in the conflict with the RDA being aided by Mangkwan clan who live in the volcanic regions of Pandora. Interviews in mid-2010 suggested that the third film would explore more of the Alpha Centauri system, but the script was not completed until late 2015. Fire and Ash started shooting simultaneously with The Way of Water in New Zealand on September 25, 2017; filming was completed in late December 2020. The film introduced a new aggressive Na'vi clan known as 'Ash People' who reside near volcanoes. Cameron announced the film's title in 2024. Like its predecessor, the film was delayed several times, initially being scheduled for a December 2015 release. It was released on December 19, 2025.

=== Avatar 4 (2029) ===
A fourth film is planned for release on December 21, 2029. Jon Landau said that, due to an eight-year time skip in the first act, a third of Avatar 4 has already been filmed to account for the aging of the child actors. However, he said that he would not continue filming the remainder of Avatar 4 until after the release of Avatar: Fire and Ash. In November 2025, Cameron said the next two sequels would not be produced if Fire and Ash was unsuccessful at the box office, but that he "will write a book" instead to resolve the "one open thread" the third installment leaves open. While Avatar: Fire and Ash made $1.5 billion at the global box office and was therefore highly profitable, this was a relative disappointment compared to the first two films. Exact plans of budgeting and scheduling Avatar 4 and 5 remain unfinished as of November 2026.

=== Avatar 5 (2031) ===
A fifth film has been announced and is scheduled for December 19, 2031. It is currently planned to be the last film of the franchise. Jon Landau stated that part of Avatar 5 will take place on Earth, with Neytiri visiting the planet. Cameron stated that Avatar: The Quest for Eywa is being considered as a possible title for the film.

=== Future ===
Cameron said he would consider making sixth and seventh films if there was demand for them. However, he said that due to his age he would have to train a successor to direct them.

== Cast and characters ==
List indicators

This section includes characters who will appear or have appeared in the franchise.

- An empty grey cell indicates the character was not in the film, or that the character's official presence has not yet been confirmed.
- ^{C} indicates a cameo role.
- ^{V} indicates a voice-only role.
- ^{Y} indicates a younger version of the character.

Character
Character	Films		
Character	Avatar	Avatar: The Way of Water	Avatar: Fire and Ash
Character	2009	2022	2025
Jake Sully	Sam Worthington	Sam Worthington	Sam Worthington
Neytiri	Zoe Saldaña	Zoe Saldaña	Zoe Saldaña
Miles Quaritch	Stephen Lang	Stephen Lang	Stephen Lang
Parker Selfridge	Giovanni Ribisi	Giovanni Ribisi	Giovanni Ribisi
Dr. Norm Spellman	Joel David Moore	Joel David Moore	Joel David Moore
Dr. Max Patel	Dileep Rao	Dileep Rao	Dileep Rao
Corporal Lyle Wainfleet	Matt Gerald	Matt Gerald	Matt Gerald
Mo'at	CCH Pounder	CCH Pounder	CCH Pounder
Dr. Grace Augustine	Sigourney Weaver	Sigourney Weaver^{C}	Sigourney Weaver^{C}
Trudy Chacón	Michelle Rodriguez		
Eytukan	Wes Studi		Wes Studi^{C}
Tsu'tey	Laz Alonso		Laz Alonso^{C}
Kiri		Sigourney Weaver	Sigourney Weaver
Ronal		Kate Winslet	Kate Winslet
Tonowari		Cliff Curtis	Cliff Curtis
General Frances Ardmore		Edie Falco	Edie Falco
Captain Mick Scoresby		Brendan Cowell	Brendan Cowell
Dr. Ian Garvin		Jemaine Clement	Jemaine Clement
Lo'ak Sully		Britain Dalton Chloe Coleman^{Y}	Britain Dalton
Miles "Spider" Socorro		Jack Champion	Jack Champion
Neteyam Sully		Jamie Flatters	Jamie Flatters^{C}
Tuktirey "Tuk" Sully		Trinity Jo-Li Bliss	Trinity Jo-Li Bliss
Tsireya "Reya"		Bailey Bass	Bailey Bass
Aonung		Filip Geljo	Filip Geljo
Rotxo		Duane Evans Jr.	Duane Evans Jr.
Varang			Oona Chaplin
Peylak			David Thewlis

== Production details ==
Production details of Avatar films
Film	Composer	Cinematographer	Editors	Production companies	Visual Effects	Distributor	Running time
Avatar	James Horner	Mauro Fiore	Stephen Rivkin; John Refoua; James Cameron	20th Century Fox; Lightstorm Entertainment; Dune Entertainment; Ingenious Film Partners	Wētā FX, Industrial Light and Magic	20th Century Fox	162 min.
Avatar: The Way of Water	Score by: Simon Franglen Themes by: James Horner	Russell Carpenter	Stephen Rivkin; David Brenner; John Refoua; James Cameron	20th Century Studios; Lightstorm Entertainment	Wētā FX, Industrial Light and Magic	20th Century Studios	192 min.
Avatar: Fire and Ash	Score by: Simon Franglen Themes by: James Horner	Russell Carpenter	Stephen Rivkin; Nicolas de Toth; John Refoua; Jason Gaudio; James Cameron	20th Century Studios; Lightstorm Entertainment	Wētā FX, Industrial Light and Magic	20th Century Studios	197 min.

== Reception ==
=== Box office performance ===
The first film grossed $2.92 billion worldwide and was the highest-grossing film in history. The second film, The Way of Water, has grossed $2.34 billion worldwide and currently ranks as the fourth highest-grossing film in history. In 2017, the fourth and fifth films in the series were expected to have a budget of $250 million each.

Box office performance for Avatar films
Film	Release date	Box office gross			Box office ranking		Budget	Ref.
Film	Release date	North America	Other territories	Worldwide	North America	Worldwide	Budget	Ref.
Avatar	December 18, 2009	$785,221,649	$2,138,489,059	$2,923,710,708	5	2	$237 million	
Avatar: The Way of Water	December 16, 2022	$688,459,501	$1,646,025,119	$2,334,484,620	8	4	$350 million	
Avatar: Fire and Ash	December 19, 2025	$404,340,010	$1,086,046,702	$1,490,386,712	57	18	$400 million	(Note: Attributed to multiple references:)
Total		$1,878,021,160	$4,870,560,880	$6,748,582,040	14	12	$987 million	

=== Critical and public response ===
Critical and public response to the Avatar films
Film	Critical		Public	
Film	Rotten Tomatoes	Metacritic	CinemaScore	PostTrak
Avatar	81% (335 reviews)	83 (38 reviews)	A	—N/a
Avatar: The Way of Water	76% (455 reviews)	67 (68 reviews)	A	91%
Avatar: Fire and Ash	66% (355 reviews)	61 (59 reviews)	A	—N/a

=== Accolades ===
Academy Awards received by the Avatar franchise
Category		2010	2023	2026
Category		Avatar	The Way of Water	Fire and Ash
Best Picture		Nominated		—N/a
Best Director		Nominated	—N/a	—N/a
Best Cinematography		Won	—N/a	—N/a
Best Costume Design		—N/a	—N/a	Nominated
Best Film Editing		Nominated	—N/a	—N/a
Best Original Score		Nominated	—N/a	—N/a
Best Production Design (Note: Starting with the 85th Academy Awards (2012), the Best Art Direction category was renamed Best Production Design.)		Won	Nominated	—N/a
Best Sound (Note: Starting with the 93rd Academy Awards (2021), the Best Sound Mixing and Best Sound Editing categories were consolidated into a single Best Sound category.)	Editing	Nominated	Nominated	—N/a
Best Sound	Mixing	Nominated	Nominated	—N/a
Best Visual Effects		Won		

== Music ==
- Avatar (Music from the Motion Picture) was scored by James Horner and released on December 15, 2009, by Atlantic Records and Fox Music.
- Avatar: The Way of Water (Original Motion Picture Soundtrack) was scored by Simon Franglen and released on December 15, 2022, by Hollywood Records.
- Avatar: Frontiers of Pandora (Original Game Soundtrack) was scored by Pinar Toprak and released on December 8, 2023, by Lakeshore Records.
- Avatar: Fire and Ash (Original Motion Picture Soundtrack) was scored by Simon Franglen and released on December 5, 2025, by Hollywood Records.

=== Singles ===
- "I See You (Theme from Avatar)"
- "Nothing Is Lost (You Give Me Strength)"
- "Dream as One"

== Other media ==
=== Video games ===
Game	Details
Avatar: The Game Original release date(s): WW: December 1, 2009	Release years by system: 2009 – PlayStation 3, Microsoft Windows, Xbox 360, Wii, Nintendo DS, PlayStation Portable, iPhone; 2010 – iPad, Android
Avatar: The Game Original release date(s): WW: December 1, 2009	Notes: Published by Ubisoft for consoles and Gameloft for mobile devices.; Acts as a non-canon prequel to the film, features Sigourney Weaver, Stephen Lang, Michelle Rodriguez, and Giovanni Ribisi reprise their roles from the film.; The casting and voice production for Avatar: The Game was handled by Blindlight.; Third-person shooter action-adventure game
Avatar: Pandora Rising Original release date: US: January 22, 2020	Release years by system: 2020 – iOS, Android
Avatar: Pandora Rising Original release date: US: January 22, 2020	Notes: Developed by FoxNext Games Los Angeles and published by FoxNext Games; Game was soft launched but never received a full release; Real-time strategy game; On February 11, 2022, it was announced the game would cease production and servers would be shut down April 4, 2022.
Avatar: Frontiers of Pandora Original release date(s): WW: December 7, 2023	Release years by system: 2023 – PlayStation 5, Windows, Xbox Series X/S, Amazon Luna
Avatar: Frontiers of Pandora Original release date(s): WW: December 7, 2023	Notes: Developed by Massive Entertainment and published by Ubisoft; Action-adventure game
Avatar: Reckoning Original release date(s): TBA	Release years by system: TBA – iOS, Android
Avatar: Reckoning Original release date(s): TBA	Notes: Developed by Archosaur Games and published by Level Infinite; MMO role-playing third-person shooter game

=== Novels ===
Following the release of Avatar, Cameron initially planned to write a novel based on the film: "...telling the story of the movie, but [going] into much more depth about all the stories that we didn't have time to deal with."

In 2013, this plan was superseded by the announcement of four new novels set within the "Avatar expanded universe", to be written by Steven Gould. The books were due to be published by Penguin Random House, but there has been no update on the planned book series since 2017.

In July 2022, the first graphic novel based on the Avatar franchise was announced.

Title	Release date	Age category	Media type	Ref.
Avatar: The High Ground	December 6, 2022 – January 10, 2023	12+	Graphic Novel	
Based on James Cameron's original screenplay for Avatar: The Way of Water and serves as a prequel to the film.; Written by Sherri L. Smith and Augustin Padilla; Illustrated by Guilherme Balbi, Michael Altiyeh, Wes Dzioba, Michael Angel Ruiz, Diego Galindo, George Quadros, Gabriel Guzman, DC Alonso; Published by Dark Horse Comics and Penguin Random House; Three part series; Volume 1, released on December 6, 2022; Volume 2, released on January 10, 2023; Volume 3, released on January 10, 2023; During the development process of creating the four Avatar sequels, a lot of new ideas and stories were created and discussed. One such original story idea that did not make it into the sequels was James Cameron's original story—"The High Ground." Cameron shared what he had written with Dark Horse Comics and it was then adapted into a graphic novel.

=== Books ===
The Art of Avatar is a film production art book released on November 30, 2009, by Abrams Books.

The World of Avatar: A Visual Exploration is a book that celebrates, explores, and explains the spectacular world of Pandora. The book was released on May 31, 2022, by DK Books.

The Art of Avatar The Way of Water takes an exclusive look at behind-the-scenes on the production and creative process of James Cameron's Avatar: The Way of Water. It was released on December 16, 2022, by DK Books.

Avatar The Way of Water The Visual Dictionary is a visual guide that showcases characters, vehicles, weapons, locations, and more from the movie, as well as many stunning exclusive details. This book was released on December 16, 2022, by DK Books.

The Making of Avatar: Avatar, Avatar: The Way of Water, Avatar: Fire and Ash is a book that explores the production of all three films. The book was released on December 19, 2025, by DK Books.

Avatar: Fire and Ash: The Visual Dictionary is a visual guide that showcases characters, vehicles, weapons, locations, and more from the movie, as well as many stunning exclusive details. This book was released on December 19, 2025, by DK Books.

=== Comic books ===
In October 2015, Dark Horse Comics signed a 10-year partnership to publish Avatar comics.

On May 6, 2017, Dark Horse Comics published a Free Comic Book Day one-shot entitled FCBD 2017: James Cameron's Avatar / Briggs Land, which included a short story set in the world of Avatar entitled "Brothers". From January to August 2019, Dark Horse published a six-issue miniseries called Avatar: Tsu'tey's Path. Tsu'tey's Path was collected in trade paperback format on November 27, 2019, with "Brothers" included as supplementary material.

Title	No. of Issues	Issue No.	Release date	Story	Art	Colors	Covers
"Brothers"	1	FCBD 2017	May 6, 2017	Sherri L. Smith	Doug Wheatley	Wes Dzioba	Dave Wilkins
Tsu'tey's Path	6	1	January 16, 2019	Sherri L. Smith	Jan Duursema (pencils); Dan Parson (inks)	Wes Dzioba	Doug Wheatley; Shea Standefer (variants)
Tsu'tey's Path	6	2	February 13, 2019	Sherri L. Smith	Jan Duursema (pencils); Dan Parson (inks)	Wes Dzioba	Doug Wheatley; Shea Standefer (variants)
Tsu'tey's Path	6	3	March 20, 2019	Sherri L. Smith	Jan Duursema (pencils); Dan Parson (inks)	Wes Dzioba	Doug Wheatley; Shea Standefer (variants)
Tsu'tey's Path	6	4	May 1, 2019	Sherri L. Smith	Jan Duursema (pencils); Dan Parson (inks)	Wes Dzioba	Doug Wheatley; Shea Standefer (variants)
Tsu'tey's Path	6	5	June 26, 2019	Sherri L. Smith	Jan Duursema (pencils); Dan Parson (inks)	Wes Dzioba	Doug Wheatley; Shea Standefer (variants)
Tsu'tey's Path	6	6	August 21, 2019	Sherri L. Smith	Jan Duursema (pencils); Dan Parson (inks)	Wes Dzioba	Doug Wheatley; Shea Standefer (variants)
The Next Shadow	4	1	January 6, 2021	Jeremy Barlow	Josh Hood	Wes Dzioba	Guilherme Balbi with Wes Dzioba
The Next Shadow	4	2	February 3, 2021	Jeremy Barlow	Josh Hood	Wes Dzioba	Guilherme Balbi with Wes Dzioba
The Next Shadow	4	3	March 3, 2021	Jeremy Barlow	Josh Hood	Wes Dzioba	Guilherme Balbi with Wes Dzioba
The Next Shadow	4	4	April 7, 2021	Jeremy Barlow	Josh Hood	Wes Dzioba	Guilherme Balbi with Wes Dzioba
Adapt or Die	6	1	May 4, 2022	Corinna Bechko	Beni Lobel	Mark Molchan	Wes Dzioba
Adapt or Die	6	2	June 1, 2022	Corinna Bechko	Beni Lobel	Mark Molchan	Wes Dzioba
Adapt or Die	6	3	July 6, 2022	Corinna Bechko	Beni Lobel	Mark Molchan	Wes Dzioba
Adapt or Die	6	4	August 1, 2022	Corinna Bechko	Beni Lobel	Mark Molchan	Wes Dzioba
Adapt or Die	6	5	September 9, 2022	Corinna Bechko	Beni Lobel	Mark Molchan	Wes Dzioba
Adapt or Die	6	6	October 5, 2022	Corinna Bechko	Beni Lobel	Mark Molchan	Wes Dzioba
Frontiers of Pandora - So'lek's Journey	6	1	February 28, 2024	Ray Fawkes	Gabriel Guzman	Michael Atiyeh	Gabriel Guzmán
Frontiers of Pandora - So'lek's Journey	6	2	March 27, 2024	Ray Fawkes	Gabriel Guzman	Michael Atiyeh	Gabriel Guzmán
Frontiers of Pandora - So'lek's Journey	6	3	April 24, 2024	Ray Fawkes	Gabriel Guzman	Michael Atiyeh	Gabriel Guzmán
Frontiers of Pandora - So'lek's Journey	6	4	May 29, 2024	Ray Fawkes	Gabriel Guzman	Michael Atiyeh	Gabriel Guzmán
Frontiers of Pandora - So'lek's Journey	6	5	July 17, 2024	Ray Fawkes	Gabriel Guzman	Michael Atiyeh	Gabriel Guzmán
Frontiers of Pandora - So'lek's Journey	6	6	August 21, 2024	Ray Fawkes	Gabriel Guzman	Michael Atiyeh	Gabriel Guzmán
Avatar: The Gap Year–Tipping Point	6	1	October 10, 2025	Ethan Sacks	Salvatore Porcaro	Michael Atiyeh	Salvatore Porcaro
Avatar: The Gap Year–Tipping Point	6	2	December 3, 2025	Ethan Sacks	Salvatore Porcaro	Michael Atiyeh	Salvatore Porcaro
Avatar: The Gap Year–Tipping Point	6	3	January 7, 2026	Ethan Sacks	Salvatore Porcaro	Michael Atiyeh	Salvatore Porcaro
Avatar: The Gap Year–Tipping Point	6	4	February 4, 2026	Ethan Sacks	Salvatore Porcaro	Michael Atiyeh	Salvatore Porcaro
Avatar: The Gap Year–Tipping Point	6	5	March 4, 2026	Ethan Sacks	Salvatore Porcaro	Michael Atiyeh	Salvatore Porcaro
Avatar: The Gap Year–Tipping Point	6	6	April 1, 2026	Ethan Sacks	Salvatore Porcaro	Michael Atiyeh	Salvatore Porcaro

==== Collected editions ====
Title	Release date	ISBN
Avatar: Tsu'tey's Path	November 27, 2019	9781506706702
Avatar: The Next Shadow	August 11, 2021	9781506722429
Avatar: Adapt or Die	February 22, 2023	9781506730714
Avatar: The High Ground Library Edition	May 10, 2023	9781506710440
Avatar: Frontiers of Pandora - So'lek's Journey	December 18, 2024	9781506732237
Avatar: The Gap Year - Tipping Point	August 18, 2026	9781506732251

=== Na'vi language ===
The Na'vi language is a constructed language developed by linguist Paul Frommer for the Avatar franchise. It features a phonology inspired by Polynesian languages, with unique grammar elements such as verb serialization and a vigesimal (base-20) number system. The vocabulary includes over 2,000 words, created for dialogue and lore in the films and expanded media. It has been used in the films, video games like Avatar: Frontiers of Pandora, and fan resources. Official learning materials, including dictionaries and phrasebooks, are available through community sites.

=== Live show ===
Toruk – The First Flight is an original stage production by the Montreal-based Cirque du Soleil which ran between December 2015 and June 2019. Inspired by Avatar, the story is set in Pandora's past, involving a prophecy concerning a threat to the Tree of Souls and a quest for totems from different tribes. Audience members could download an app in order to participate in show effects. On January 18, 2016, it was announced via the Toruk Facebook page that filming for a DVD release had been completed and was undergoing editing.

=== Exhibition ===
Avatar The Exhibition is a touring exhibition based on the first film. It opened in Chengdu, China on May 1, 2021, and closed on December 31, 2021. It is currently touring Asia with future stops planned around the globe.

=== Theme park attractions ===
==== Pandora: World of Avatar ====
In 2011, Cameron, Lightstorm, and Fox entered an exclusive licensing agreement with the Walt Disney Company to feature Avatar-themed attractions at Disney Experiences worldwide, including a themed land for Disney's Animal Kingdom in Lake Buena Vista, Florida. The area, known as Pandora – The World of Avatar, opened on May 27, 2017. The themed land is set generations after the events of the films and features two attractions: Avatar Flight of Passage, a flying simulator attraction, and Na'vi River Journey, a boat dark ride.

==== Avatar Land ====
In February 2023, Disney CEO Bob Iger announced that a new attraction based on the Avatar films, that he referred to as "Avatar Experience", would open at Disneyland. In August 2024, it was announced that the Avatar land will be built at Disney California Adventure. The land will be inspired by The Way of Water (2022), Fire and Ash (2025) and future Avatar films.

== Cultural impact ==
=== Psychological impact ===
A phenomenon known as "post-Avatar depression syndrome" (PADS) or "Avatar blues" has been reported among some viewers of the films, characterized by feelings of sadness, disconnection from reality, and longing for the fictional world of Pandora. It is not a recognized medical condition. Symptoms reportedly include depression, meaninglessness, and dissatisfaction with the real world, alongside concerns about Earth's future and issues like climate change. One report mentioned suicidal ideation linked to a desire to reincarnate on Pandora.

The condition is attributed to a yearning for Pandora's utopian society and its harmony with nature, contrasting with Earth's perceived flaws. Affected viewers reportedly express wishes to inhabit Pandora or escape via virtual reality. Estimates from fan forums suggest 10–20% of participants reported similar feelings.

=== Consideration of indigenous people ===
Some indigenous groups, including Native Americans, have called for a boycott of the franchise over "tone-deaf" handling of indigenous cultures and cultural appropriation. The first two Avatar films have drawn criticism for casting several white and other non-indigenous actors in the roles of the alien native people. Cameron said he tried to move away from a white savior narrative. The film series was criticized for "romanticization of colonization" and putting forward a monolithic portrayal of Indigenous people.

Cameron faced criticism for comments made after the release of the first film. In 2010, Cameron and Avatar actors supported the Xingu peoples in opposing the construction of the Belo Monte Dam.

In 2012, Cameron said Avatar is a fictional retelling of the history of North and South America in the early Colonial period, "with all its conflict and bloodshed between the military aggressors from Europe and the indigenous peoples".

=== Avatar in Concert ===
In 2025, the franchise's cultural footprint expanded through live events like Avatar: Live in Concert, which began touring Europe in April, featuring orchestral performances of the films' scores synchronized with film footage. The tour, produced by Avex Classics International, highlighted the series' musical legacy and drew fans to venues such as the Zénith de Paris and Royal Albert Hall. These concerts, alongside the release of the Fire and Ash trailer in August 2025, reignited debates on the franchise's enduring cultural impact.
