= Avatar: Fire and Ash (soundtrack) =

Avatar: Fire and Ash (Original Motion Picture Soundtrack)

Soundtrack album by Simon Franglen
- Released: December 5, 2025
- Recorded: 2025
- Studios: Newman Scoring Stage; Bandrika Studios; Evergreen Studios; Henson Recording Studios; Stella Maris Chapel
- Genres: Film soundtrack; film score
- Length: 2:11:00
- Label: Hollywood
- Producer: Simon Franglen

Simon Franglen chronology
| Avatar: The Way of Water (Original Motion Picture Soundtrack) (2022) | Avatar: Fire and Ash (Original Motion Picture Soundtrack) (2025) |

Singles from Avatar: Fire and Ash (Original Motion Picture Soundtrack)
- 1. "Dream as One" Released: November 14, 2025

Avatar: Fire and Ash (Original Motion Picture Soundtrack) is the soundtrack album to the 2025 epic science fiction film Avatar: Fire and Ash, directed and co-produced by James Cameron, a sequel to Avatar: The Way of Water (2022). The album featured an original score composed and conducted by Simon Franglen and two original songs, one by singer–songwriter Miley Cyrus, the other by co-star Zoe Saldaña.

== Development ==
In August 2021, Jon Landau announced that Simon Franglen would compose the score for the Avatar sequels. In October 2025, it was announced that Miley Cyrus would create an original song for the film, titled "Dream as One", co-written with Mark Ronson and Andrew Wyatt. A second original song, composed by Franglen, titled "The Future and the Past", sung in the N'avi language by Zoe Saldaña, ends the album.

Franglen stated that development of the soundtrack had taken seven years to complete. Franglen created two new instruments, a string-based instrument and a percussion instrument, designed to be played by the N'avi for the soundtrack.

== Release ==
The soundtrack to Avatar: Fire and Ash was digitally released on December 5, 2025, by Hollywood Records, with "Dream as One" serving as the lead single from the album released on November 14, 2025. The soundtrack was released on vinyl on January 30, 2026. The soundtrack was previously set to be released on December 12, 2025.

== Track listing ==
Avatar: Fire and Ash (Original Motion Picture Soundtrack)
| No. | Title | Performer(s) | Length |
|---|---|---|---|
| 1. | "Dream as One" | Miley Cyrus | 3:22 |
| 2. | "Brothers" (Contains Avatar Theme by James Horner) | | 3:52 |
| 3. | "Mourning" | | 2:11 |
| 4. | "You Still Have This Family" | | 3:03 |
| 5. | "The Windtraders" | | 2:57 |
| 6. | "Caravan at Night" | | 1:17 |
| 7. | "Mangkwan Attack" | | 5:18 |
| 8. | "Forest Chase" | | 3:40 |
| 9. | "Miracle" (Contains Avatar Theme by James Horner) | | 5:29 |
| 10. | "How Do You Still Live" | | 5:00 |
| 11. | "Family Reunited" | | 2:58 |
| 12. | "Exiled" | | 3:16 |
| 13. | "You Said You Could Protect Us" (Contains Avatar Theme by James Horner) | | 3:06 |
| 14. | "I Can Be Your Guide" | | 1:15 |
| 15. | "The Ash Camp" | | 3:25 |
| 16. | "I Am the Fire" | | 5:50 |
| 17. | "Find the Girl" | | 1:58 |
| 18. | "The Beach" | | 6:31 |
| 19. | "Mission Accomplished" | | 3:20 |
| 20. | "Lo'ak" | | 3:24 |
| 21. | "The Deep Ones" | | 1:51 |
| 22. | "I Am Your Father" | | 1:55 |
| 23. | "Disguise and Escape" | | 3:06 |
| 24. | "Protest Noted" (Contains Avatar Theme by James Horner) | | 3:49 |
| 25. | "Sacrifice" | | 4:31 |
| 26. | "Tulkun Council" | | 5:06 |
| 27. | "Preparing for Attack" | | 3:24 |
| 28. | "Marshalling Forces" (Contains Avatar Theme by James Horner) | | 6:07 |
| 29. | "I Call Upon the Warrior Mother" | | 3:51 |
| 30. | "Wounded" | | 2:53 |
| 31. | "You Will Protect Her" | | 3:57 |
| 32. | "Herding Tulkun" | | 1:21 |
| 33. | "Settling the Score" (Contains Avatar Theme by James Horner) | | 3:35 |
| 34. | "Leave My Mother Alone" (Contains Avatar Theme by James Horner) | | 3:53 |
| 35. | "Flux Devil" | | 3:52 |
| 36. | "The Light Always Returns" | | 3:34 |
| 37. | "The Future and the Past" | Zoe Saldaña | 3:10 |
| Total length: | | | 2:11:00 |

== Accolades ==
| Award | Date of ceremony | Category | Recipient(s) | Result | Ref. |
|---|---|---|---|---|---|
| Hollywood Music in Media Awards | November 19, 2025 | Best Original Score in a Sci-Fi/Fantasy Film | Simon Franglen | Won | |
| Hollywood Music in Media Awards | November 19, 2025 | Best Original Song in a Feature Film | "Dream as One" (Miley Cyrus, Mark Ronson, Andrew Wyatt, and Simon Franglen) | Nominated | |
| Golden Globe Awards | January 11, 2026 | Best Original Song | "Dream as One" (Miley Cyrus, Mark Ronson, Andrew Wyatt, and Simon Franglen) | Nominated | |
| Satellite Awards | March 8, 2026 | Best Original Song | "Dream as One" (Miley Cyrus, Mark Ronson, Andrew Wyatt, and Simon Franglen) | Won | |
