= Dream as One =

2025 single by Miley Cyrus

Single by Miley Cyrus

from the album Avatar: Fire and Ash
- Released: November 14, 2025
- Studio: Sunset Sound Recorders (Hollywood, Los Angeles)
- Length: 3:20
- Label: Columbia • Hollywood
- Songwriters: Miley Cyrus; Mark Ronson; Andrew Wyatt; Simon Franglen
- Producers: Miley Cyrus; Mark Ronson; Andrew Wyatt

Miley Cyrus singles chronology
"Secrets" (2025)	"Dream as One" (2025)	"Younger You" (2026)

Music video
- "Dream as One" on YouTube

"Dream as One" is a song by American singer Miley Cyrus, recorded for the epic science fiction film, Avatar: Fire and Ash (2025). It was released by Columbia Records and Hollywood Records on November 14, 2025, as the lead single from the film's soundtrack. Cyrus wrote and produced the track with Mark Ronson and Andrew Wyatt, while Simon Franglen provided additional songwriting. It received a nomination for Best Original Song at 83rd Golden Globe Awards but lost to "Golden" from KPop Demon Hunters.

== Background and release ==
Cyrus collaborated with Mark Ronson on the 2018 single "Nothing Breaks Like a Heart". She worked with both Ronson and Andrew Wyatt on her EP She Is Coming (2019) and studio album Plastic Hearts (2020). In 2023, both Cyrus and James Cameron were being inducted as Disney Legends at the D23 Awards. During the ceremony, Cyrus told Cameron that she was available if he ever needed her. Afterwards, he asked her to prepare a song for Avatar: Fire and Ash. Being a fan of the Avatar franchise since its launch in 2009, she agreed.

On October 22, 2025, Cyrus announced the song and shared its snippet on her social media. The song was released digitally on November 14, 2025. It was played over the closing credits of the film.

== Recording and composition ==
"The theme of fire and ash, obviously for the kind of literal reasons of losing my house, rebuilding, growing from the ground up, and this Phoenix resilience and courage to keep going. But also not doing it alone, to kind of reach out and ask for help from the people around you that care."

— Cyrus talking to Entertainment Weekly about the writing process

Cameron wanted the song to be titled "Dream as One," as the phrase evokes the film's finale. Cyrus worked on the song with Ronson and Wyatt at the Sunset Sound Recorders in Hollywood, Los Angeles. It was co-written with the film's score composer, Simon Franglen, and in cooperation with Cameron, who were both at the time working on the film in New Zealand. To help Cyrus, Ronson and Wyatt understand the story, Franglen set them up with footage from the unfinished film. The melody, described by Cyrus as "classic Disney", was written primarily by Wyatt. Cyrus was working mainly on the lyrics. She recalled wanting to bring the female perspective, contrary to the film's plot, presented mainly from the masculine point of view. She came up with words "We're diamonds in the dark," inspired by finding diamonds in the ashes of her house, which burned during the 2018 Woolsey Fire. On the bridge, she ad-libbed the "big outbursts of vocals" to honor Janis Joplin, who used to work at the same studio. She recalled being unsure if Cameron would approve it, but he accepted it.

"Dream as One" is a ballad, described by Billboard's Gil Kaufman as "soaring" and "emotional". Emily Zemler of Rolling Stone and Eddie Fu of Consequence described it as "anthemic". It is built atop piano and string instruments, starting with a "pulsing" piano line. According to Zemler, its lyrics describe the "hopes for the future". Fu noted that it "draws an added layer of meaning from [Cyrus'] own experiences with beating addiction and losing her home in a wildfire." According to Tristen Schilling from Hot Press, "the track explores themes of unity, courage and connection."

== Accolades ==
"Dream as One" was shortlisted for the Academy Award for Best Original Song at the 98th Academy Awards. It was nominated for Best Original Song at the 83rd Golden Globe Awards, making it Cyrus' third nomination in the category. For the song, Cyrus was announced as the recipient of the honorary Outstanding Artistic Achievement Award at the 37th Palm Springs International Film Festival.

List of awards and nominations
Award	Date of ceremony	Category	Recipient(s)	Result	Ref.
Golden Globe Awards	January 11, 2026	Best Original Song	Miley Cyrus, Mark Ronson, Andrew Wyatt, and Simon Franglen	Nominated	
Hollywood Music in Media Awards	November 19, 2025	Best Original Song in a Feature Film	Miley Cyrus, Mark Ronson, Andrew Wyatt, and Simon Franglen	Nominated	
Palm Springs International Film Festival	January 3, 2026	Outstanding Artistic Achievement Award	Miley Cyrus	Won	
Satellite Awards	March 8, 2026	Best Original Song	Miley Cyrus, Mark Ronson, Andrew Wyatt, and Simon Franglen	Won	

== Music video ==
The music video for the song was released on December 9, 2025. It was directed by Glen Luchford, who previously worked with Cyrus on the visual design of her album Something Beautiful (2025).

== Charts ==
Chart performance for "Dream as One"
Chart (2025–2026)	Peak position
Czech Republic Airplay (ČNS IFPI)	3
France Airplay (SNEP)	2
Germany Airplay (BVMI)	56
Portugal Airplay (AFP)	5
Switzerland Airplay (IFPI)	32
UK Singles Sales (OCC)	58
UK Singles Downloads Chart (OCC)	53
