= Dileep Rao =

American actor

- Born: Dileep A. Rao; July 29, 1973 (age 53); Los Angeles, California, U.S.
- Education: University of California, San Diego (BA); American Conservatory Theater (MFA)
- Occupation: Actor
- Years active: 2006–present

Dileep A. Rao (born July 29, 1973) is an American actor who has appeared in feature films and television series. He starred in Sam Raimi's horror film Drag Me to Hell (2009), James Cameron's science fiction film series Avatar (2009–present), and Christopher Nolan's thriller Inception (2010).

== Early life and education ==
Rao was born in Los Angeles, California, to a physicist mother and an engineer father, both of Kannadiga descent. He grew up in Yanbu, Saudi Arabia; Denver, Colorado; and Claremont, California. He has one sister, who is a professor at the University of Michigan's Ross School of Business. He graduated from Claremont High School and the University of California, San Diego, with a B.A., later receiving an M.F.A. from the American Conservatory Theater in San Francisco, where his class included Anna Belknap and Elizabeth Banks.

== Career ==
Rao's first role after graduating was in the American premiere of Indian Ink by Tom Stoppard. Rao moved to Los Angeles and began working in regional theater including at the Berkeley Rep, South Coast Repertory, and for the Manhattan Theater Club.

He competed on Jeopardy! on June 7, 2002, and won $34,400. On June 8, 2008, Rao was randomly selected from over 1,600 entrants to play the NPR Weekend Edition Sunday puzzle on air with Will Shortz.

In 2009, he appeared in Avatar and Drag Me to Hell. He was nominated for several awards as part of the ensemble cast in Christopher Nolan's 2010 film Inception, in which he played a pharmacologist.

== Filmography ==
Key
| † | Denotes films that have not yet been released |

=== Film ===
| Year | Film | Role | Notes |
|---|---|---|---|
| 2009 | Drag Me to Hell | Rham Jas | |
| 2009 | Avatar | Dr. Max Patel | |
| 2010 | Inception | Yusuf | |
| 2014 | Murder of a Cat | Doctor Mundhra | |
| 2015 | Beeba Boys | Kash Sood | |
| 2022 | Avatar: The Way of Water | Dr. Max Patel | |
| 2025 | Avatar: Fire and Ash | Dr. Max Patel | |

=== Television ===
| Year | Title | Role | Notes |
|---|---|---|---|
| 2002 | Jeopardy! | Himself | 2 episodes |
| 2006 | Standoff | Robert | 1 episode |
| 2008 | Brothers & Sisters | Arlo Natterson | 1 episode |
| 2012 | Childrens Hospital | Glenn Richard | 1 episode |
| 2013 | Touch | Vikash Nayar | 2 episodes |
| 2015 | Z Nation | Odegard | 1 episode |
| 2017 | Mr. Robot | Sandesh Markesh | 1 episode |
