= Trinity Bliss =

American actor, singer, and YouTuber (born 2009)

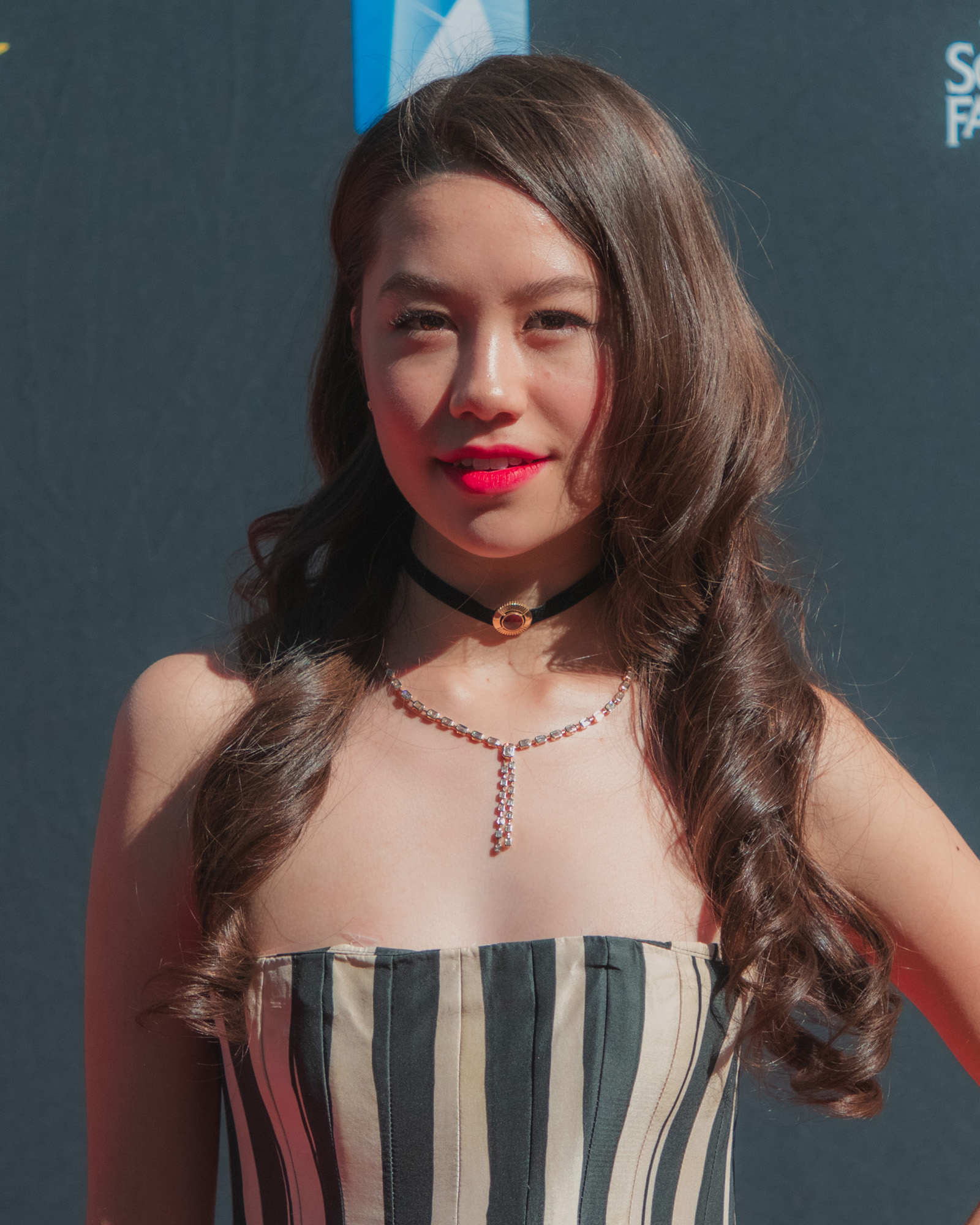
- Bliss in 2026
- Born: Trinity Jo-Li Bliss; November 5, 2009 (age 17); Los Angeles, California U.S.
- Occupations: Actress; singer; YouTuber
- Years active: 2017–present
- Website: https://www.trinitybliss.com

Trinity Jo-Li Bliss (born November 5, 2009) is an American actor, singer, and YouTuber. In film, she is known for playing the role of Tuk in James Cameron's Avatar franchise, which marked her film debut. On television, she played Stella Zhau one a 2022 episode of the Nickelodeon live-action television series The Really Loud House (2022–2024) and the television film A Really Haunted Loud House (2023).

== Early life ==
Trinity Jo-Li Bliss was born on November 5, 2009, near Los Angeles, California. Her mother immigrated from China to pursue graduate studies in aerospace engineering before switching to statistics. Her parents met while both worked at a biotech company. When she was younger, she joined theater summer camp productions of Beauty and the Beast, The Lion King, and Matilda, which motivated her to take acting lessons and learn music.

== Career ==
In June 2017, Bliss was cast in her acting debut as Tuktirey or Tuk in James Cameron's Avatar sequels, beginning with Avatar: The Way of Water in 2022; she was nine years old after filming completed and was thirteen when The Way of Water premiered. Bliss related closely to Tuk as she is both biracial and the youngest of the family like her character. Bliss underwent three months of training for the film series, which consisted of learning the film's dialect, movement, free diving, archery, knife work, parkour, and night training. She also went to school on set due to the long hours required in filming.

Since 2021, she has uploaded cover versions of songs and has sung some of her own. Her first studio album, Confessions of a Preteen, was released on January 20, 2023.

Bliss played Stella Zhau in the Nickelodeon live-action television series The Really Loud House (2022–2024) and the tie-in live-action television film A Really Haunted Loud House (2023).

In October 2023, it was announced that she'd been cast as Cat McCoy in The Life of Chuck, a film directed by Mike Flanagan based on the short story of the same name by Stephen King. The film was released in 2025. Bliss returns as Tuk in Avatar: Fire and Ash in December 2025, having already filmed the second and third films of the franchise simultaneously by James Cameron to avoid the young cast aging. She also filmed flashback scenes for the planned fourth film during this time, which would have a time jump and would explore Tuk at Bliss's current age; the film would push through depending on the box office performance of Fire and Ash.

On November 21, 2025, Bliss released the single "You Make Me Wanna Dance", with a music video released inspired by high school romance films. On January 6, 2026, she released another single, "Chemistry".

== Filmography ==
=== Film ===
Year	Title	Role	Notes
2022	Avatar: The Way of Water	Tuk	
2023	Glisten and the Merry Mission	Marzipan (voice)	
2024	Little Wing	Tessa Lu	
2024	The Life of Chuck	Cat McCoy	
2025	Avatar: Fire and Ash	Tuk	

=== Television ===
Year	Title	Role	Notes
2021	Mr. Corman	Susan	1 episode
2022	The Garcias	Alexa Huh Garcia	10 episodes
2022	Best Foot Forward	Gabriella	10 episodes
2022	The Really Loud House	Stella Zhau	Episode: "The Blemish Dilemish"
2023–2024	Princess Power	Rita Raspberry	Voice / Lead role
2023	A Really Haunted Loud House	Stella Zhau	Television film

=== Video games ===
Year	Title	Role	Notes
2024	Final Fantasy VII Rebirth	Chloe	Voice / English dub

== Discography ==
=== Studio albums ===
Year	Album
2023	Confessions of a Preteen
