= Avatar (soundtrack) =

Avatar (Music from the Motion Picture)

Soundtrack album by James Horner
- Released: December 15, 2009
- Recorded: 2009
- Studios: Newman Scoring Stage, Fox Studios, Los Angeles, CA
- Genre: Soundtrack
- Length: 78:51
- Labels: Atlantic; Fox Music
- Producers: Executives: Craig Kallman; Kevin Weaver

James Horner chronology
The Boy in the Striped Pyjamas (2008)	Avatar: Music from the Motion Picture (2009)	The Karate Kid (2010)

Singles from Avatar: Music from the Motion Picture
- 1. "I See You" Released: December 3, 2009

Professional ratings
Review scores
Source	Rating
AllMusic	3.5/5 stars
Empire	4/5 stars
Filmtracks	5/5 stars
IGN	8.9 stars on a 10 point scale
Movie Music UK	4/5 stars
Movie Wave	5/5 stars
ScoreNotes	9/10 stars

Avatar (Music from the Motion Picture) is the soundtrack album to the 2009 James Cameron film Avatar, with music composed, orchestrated and conducted by James Horner and performed by the Newman Scoring Stage. The album's deluxe edition, featuring six bonus tracks, was released by Atlantic Records and Fox Music on April 19, 2010 to promote the DVD release of the film.

== Album information ==
Composer James Horner scored the film, his third and final collaboration with Cameron after Aliens and Titanic. Horner recorded parts of the score with a small chorus singing in the Na'vi language in March 2008. He also worked with Wanda Bryant, an ethnomusicologist, to create a music culture for the alien race. Horner took advice from his assistant, and they put an unusual number of virtual instruments in this project. The first scoring sessions with the Hollywood Studio Symphony, took place in spring 2009. Leona Lewis sang the theme song, "I See You". An accompanying music video, directed by Jake Nava, premiered on MySpace on December 15, 2009.

A bonus track called "Into the Na'vi World" is available exclusively through the official site. It was not included on the physical and digital releases of the soundtrack.

== Accolades ==
The score was nominated for Best Original Score at the 82nd Academy Awards. "I See You" was nominated for a Golden Globe in the Best Original Song category for the 67th Golden Globes.

== Track listing ==
All lyrics are written by James Horner, except where noted.

No.	Title	Length
1.	"You Don't Dream in Cryo. ...."	6:09
2.	"Jake Enters His Avatar World"	5:24
3.	"Pure Spirits of the Forest"	8:49
4.	"The Bioluminescence of the Night"	3:37
5.	"Becoming One of "The People", Becoming One with Neytiri"	7:43
6.	"Climbing Up "Iknimaya – The Path to Heaven""	3:18
7.	"Jake's First Flight"	4:49
8.	"Scorched Earth"	3:32
9.	"Quaritch"	5:01
10.	"The Destruction of Hometree"	6:47
11.	"Shutting Down Grace's Lab"	2:47
12.	"Gathering All the Na'vi Clans for Battle"	5:14
13.	"War"	11:21
14.	"I See You (Theme from Avatar)" (performed by Leona Lewis) (composed by Horner, Thaddis Harrell, Simon Franglen)	4:20
Total length:		78:51

Deluxe Edition bonus tracks
No.	Title	Length
15.	"Pandora"	3:17
16.	"Viperwolves Attack"	3:49
17.	"Great Leonoptryx"	1:33
18.	"Escape from Hellgate"	3:25
19.	"Healing Ceremony"	2:21
20.	"The Death of Quaritch"	5:20
Total length:		19:45

== Personnel ==
- Strings: 32 violins, 22 violas, 10 violoncellos, 8 double basses
- Woodwinds: 2 flutes, 2 oboes, 3 clarinets, 3 bassoons
- Brass: 10 French horns, 4 trumpets, 5 trombones, 1 tuba
- Percussion: 5 members
- 3 members on piano/synth, 2 harps, 40 members of choir

== Chart positions ==
The album has also charted on the Billboard 200 album chart on the week of January 2, 2010, debuting at number 172. The following week it climbed the chart to gain a new peak at number 119, and then the following week it leaped to number 32. On the week of January 23, 2010 the soundtrack hit its current peak at number 31.

Chart (2010)	Peak position
Australian ARIA Albums Chart	89
Austrian Albums Chart	11
Belgian Albums Chart (Flanders)	37
Belgian Albums Chart (Wallonia)	55
Dutch Albums Chart	74
French Albums Chart	19
French Digital Albums Chart	1
German Albums Chart	10
Greek Albums Chart	10
Hungarian Albums (MAHASZ)	22
Mexican Albums Chart	69
Polish Albums Chart	53
Spanish Albums Chart	75
Swiss Albums Chart	9
UK Albums Chart	15
U.S. Billboard 200 Chart	31
U.S. Billboard Digital Albums	4
U.S. Billboard Soundtrack Albums	5

=== I See You ===
"I See You" entered the Irish Singles Chart on the 14th January 2010 at number 47.

Chart (2010)	Peak position
Irish Singles Chart	47
