= Duane Evans Jr. =

New Zealand actor (born 2003)

- Born: 5 September 2003 (age 23)
- Occupation: Actor
- Years active: 2006–present

Duane Wichman-Evans Jr. (born 5 September 2003) is a New Zealand film and television actor. He is best known for portraying Michael Hampton-Rees, a recurring character in the TVNZ 2 prime-time soap opera and medical drama series Shortland Street (2015–2017). Evans also starred as Rotxo, a secondary character in the epic science fiction films Avatar: The Way of Water (2022) and Avatar: Fire and Ash (2025). He portrayed Royden in the 2020 action comedy feature film The Legend of Baron To'a, and Pahirua in the 2023 historical drama feature film The Convert. Evans starred as Rhino in the Netflix fantasy drama series Sweet Tooth (2021), as Michael, one of the main characters in the TVNZ+ young adult comedy miniseries Duckrockers (2022), and as Dacus, a recurring character in the Starz historical drama series Spartacus: House of Ashur.

== Biography ==
Duane Wichman-Evans Jr. is a New Zealand citizen of Māori and Cook Island descent, belonging to iwi (tribes) of Ngāti Whātua and Ngāpuhi. He grew up in Auckland, New Zealand. His father, Apai Wichman is an older brother of Ngamau Munokoa, a Cook Islands politician, the deputy prime minister from 2003 to 2004, and a former Cabinet Minister. His mother came from the island of Aitutaki in Cook Islands.

Evans begun performing at the age of 3, starring in advertisements and as a child model. His first film role was Tee in a 2011 short film titled Ebony Society directed by Tammy Davis. He also starred in the 2011 documentary film Billy T: Te Movie, in which he portrayed Billy T. James as a child. In 2013, he received the award for the best male actor at the Wairoa Māori Film Festival in Nūhaka, New Zealand, for the role of Jacob in the short film I'm Going to Mum's. Evans starred as young Pi in the 2013 family drama feature film Fantail, and as Rawri in the 2014 sports drama television film The Kick. From 2015 to 2017, he portrayed Michael Hampton-Rees, a recurring character in the TVNZ 2 prime-time soap opera and medical drama series Shortland Street. Evans also appeared in the television series Tatau (2015), Power Rangers Ninja Steel (2017), and The New Legends of Monkey (2018). He portrayed Royden in the 2020 action comedy feature film The Legend of Baron To'a, and Pahirua in the 2023 historical drama feature film The Convert. Evans also starred as Rhino in two episodes of the Netflix fantasy drama series Sweet Tooth (2021), and portrayed Michael, one of the main characters in the TVNZ+ young adult comedy miniseries Duckrockers (2022). Evans starred as Rotxo, a secondary character in the epic science fiction films Avatar: The Way of Water (2022) and Avatar: Fire and Ash (2025). His scenes were filmed between 2017 and 2018. He also starred as Dacus, a recurring character in the Starz historical drama series Spartacus: House of Ashur.

== Personal life ==
Evans lives in Auckland, New Zealand. He is fluent in English and Māori, and also speaks Cook Islands Māori. Evans is also a competitive kapa haka performer.

== Filmography ==
=== Films ===
Year	Title	Role	Notes
2011	Billy T: Te Movie	Young Billy T. James	Documentary film
2011	Ebony Society	Tee	Short film
2013	Fantail	Young Pi	Feature film
2013	I'm Going to Mum's	Jacob	Short film
2014	The Kick	Rawri	Television film
2016	Possum	Nathan	Short film
2017	Tree	Kisione	Short film
2020	Legend of Baron To'a	Royden	Feature film
2022	Avatar: The Way of Water	Rotxo	Feature film
2023	The Convert	Pahirua	Feature film
2023	Inside Pandora's Box	Himself	Documentary film
2025	Avatar: Fire and Ash	Rotxo	Feature film

=== Television series ===
Year	Title	Role	Notes
2006	Style Pasifika Fashion Awards	Himself (child model)	Television special
2012	Marae	Himself (segment host)	Talk show
2012	Nothing Trivial	Billy	Episode: "Who Was Mad, Bad, and Dangerous?"
2012	Pūkana	Himself (Māori student)	Entertainment show
2014	Pūkana	Himself (guest singer)	Entertainment show
2015	Tatau	Boy	Miniseries; 3 episodes
2015–2017	Shortland Street	Michael Hampton-Rees	Recurring role; 194 episodes
2017	Just Cook: Annual Cooking Competition	Himself	Television special; game show
2017	Power Rangers Ninja Steel	Billy	Episode: "The Royal Rival"
2018	The New Legends of Monkey	Town boy	Episode: "The Edge of Nowhere"
2021	Sweet Tooth	Rhino	2 episodes
2022	Duckrockers	Michael	Miniseries; main role; 8 episodes
2025	Spartacus: House of Ashur	Dacus	Recurring role; 7 episodes

== Accolades ==
Accolades received by Ghosts
Year	Award	Category	Nominated work	Result	Ref.
2013	Wairoa Māori Film Festival Awards	Best Male Actor	I'm Going to Mum's	Won	
