= Satellite Award for Best Original Song =

American film music award

- Awarded for: Best Original Song
- Country: United States
- Presented by: International Press Academy
- First award: 1996
- Currently held by: "Dream as One" from Avatar: Fire and Ash (2025)

The Satellite Award for Best Original Song is an annual award given by the International Press Academy.

== Winners and nominees ==
=== 1990s ===
Year	Song	Film	Recipient(s)
1996	"You Must Love Me"	Evita	Andrew Lloyd Webber, Tim Rice
1996	"God Give Me Strength"	Grace of My Heart	Elvis Costello, Burt Bacharach
1996	"Kissing You"	Romeo + Juliet	Des'ree, Tim Atack
1996	"That Thing You Do!"	That Thing You Do!	Adam Schlesinger
1996	"Walls"	She's the One	Tom Petty
1997	"My Heart Will Go On"	Titanic	James Horner, Will Jennings
1997	"Journey to the Past"	Anastasia	Stephen Flaherty, Lynn Ahrens
1997	"Once Upon a December"	Anastasia	Stephen Flaherty, Lynn Ahrens
1997	"A Song for Mama"	Soul Food	Kenneth "Babyface" Edmonds
1997	"Tomorrow Never Dies"	Tomorrow Never Dies	Sheryl Crow, Mitchell Froom
1998	"I Don't Want to Miss a Thing"	Armageddon	Diane Warren
1998	"Anyone at All"	You've Got Mail	Carole King, Carole Bayer Sager
1998	"The Flame Still Burns"	Still Crazy	Marti Frederiksen, Mick Jones, Chris Difford
1998	"That'll Do"	Babe: Pig in the City	Randy Newman
1998	"When You Believe"	The Prince of Egypt	Stephen Schwartz
1999	"When She Loved Me"	Toy Story 2	Randy Newman
1999	"(I) Get Lost"	The Story of Us	Eric Clapton, Simon Climie
1999	"Mountain Town"	South Park: Bigger Longer & Uncut	Trey Parker, Marc Shaiman
1999	"Save Me"	Magnolia	Aimee Mann
1999	"The World Is Not Enough"	The World Is Not Enough	David Arnold, Don Black
1999	"Still"	Dogma	Alanis Morissette

=== 2000s ===
Year	Song	Film	Recipient(s)
2000	"I've Seen It All"	Dancer in the Dark	Björk, Sjón, Lars von Trier
2000	"Things Have Changed"	Wonder Boys	Bob Dylan
2000	"Yours Forever"	The Perfect Storm	James Horner
2000	"A Fool In Love"	Meet the Parents	Randy Newman
2000	"My Funny Friend and Me"	The Emperor's New Groove	Sting, David Hartley
2001	"All Love Can Be"	A Beautiful Mind	James Horner, Will Jennings
2001	"Come What May"	Moulin Rouge!	David Baerwald
2001	"There You'll Be"	Pearl Harbor	Diane Warren
2001	"Vanilla Sky"	Vanilla Sky	Paul McCartney
2001	"I Fall Apart"	Vanilla Sky	Nancy Wilson, Cameron Crowe
2002	"Something to Talk About"	About a Boy	Badly Drawn Boy
2002	"8 Mile"	8 Mile	Eminem, Luis Resto
2002	"Die Another Day"	Die Another Day	Madonna, Mirwais Ahmadzaï
2002	"Love Is a Crime"	Chicago	Greg Lawson, Denise Rich, Damon Sharpe, Rick Wake
2002	"Work It Out"	Austin Powers in Goldmember	Beyoncé Knowles, Pharrell Williams, Chad Hugo
2002	"Girl on the Roof"	Van Wilder	David Mead
2003	"Siente Mi Amor (Feel My Love)"	Once Upon a Time in Mexico	Robert Rodriguez
2003	"Cross the Green Mountain"	Gods and Generals	Bob Dylan
2003	"Great Spirits"	Brother Bear	Phil Collins
2003	"The Heart of Every Girl"	Mona Lisa Smile	Elton John
2003	"How Shall I See You Through My Tears"	Camp	Bob Telson, Lee Breuer
2003	"A Kiss at the End of the Rainbow"	A Mighty Wind	Michael McKean, Annette O'Toole
2004	"Million Voices"	Hotel Rwanda	Wyclef Jean, Jerry 'Wonder' Duplessis, Andrea Guerra
2004	"Believe"	The Polar Express	Glen Ballard, Alan Silvestri
2004	"Blind Leading the Blind"	Alfie	Mick Jagger, David A. Stewart
2004	"The Book of Love"	Shall We Dance	Stephen Merritt
2004	"Learn to Be Lonely"	The Phantom of the Opera	Andrew Lloyd Webber
2004	"Shine Your Light"	Ladder 49	Robbie Robertson
2005	"A Love That Will Never Grow Old"	Brokeback Mountain	Gustavo Santaolalla, Bernie Taupin
2005	"In the Deep"	Crash	Michael Becker, Kathleen York
2005	"Hustler's Ambition"	Get Rich or Die Tryin'	50 Cent, Brian Hughes, Frankie Beverly
2005	"Magic Works"	Harry Potter and the Goblet of Fire	Jarvis Cocker
2005	"Broken"	Kiss Kiss Bang Bang	Robert Downey Jr.
2006	"You Know My Name"	Casino Royale	Chris Cornell
2006	"Listen"	Dreamgirls	Henry Krieger, Anne Preven, Scott Cutler, Beyoncé Knowles
2006	"Love You I Do"	Dreamgirls	Henry Krieger, Siedah Garrett
2006	"Never Let Go"	The Guardian	Bryan Adams, Trevor Rabin, Eliot Kennedy
2006	"Till the End of Time"	Little Miss Sunshine	Nick Urata, DeVotchKa
2006	"Upside Down"	Curious George	Jack Johnson
2007	"Grace is Gone"	Grace Is Gone	Clint Eastwood, Carole Bayer Sager
2007	"Do You Feel Me"	American Gangster	Diane Warren
2007	"Come So Far"	Hairspray	Marc Shaiman
2007	"Rise"	Into the Wild	Eddie Vedder
2007	"Lyra"	The Golden Compass	Kate Bush
2007	"If You Want Me"	Once	Glen Hansard, Marketa Irglova
2008	"Another Way to Die"	Quantum of Solace	Jack White
2008	"The Wrestler"	The Wrestler	Bruce Springsteen
2008	"By the Boab Tree"	Australia	Felix Meagher, Angela Little, Baz Luhrmann
2008	"Jai Ho"	Slumdog Millionaire	A.R. Rahman, Gulzar
2008	"Down to Earth"	WALL-E	Peter Gabriel
2008	"If the World"	Body of Lies	Guns N' Roses
2009	"The Weary Kind"	Crazy Heart	Ryan Bingham, T Bone Burnett
2009	"We Are the Children of the World"	The Imaginarium of Doctor Parnassus	Terry Gilliam
2009	"Cinema Italiano"	Nine	Maury Yeston
2009	"I See In Color"	Precious	Mary J. Blige
2009	"Almost There"	The Princess and the Frog	Randy Newman
2009	"Down in New Orleans	The Princess and the Frog	Randy Newman

=== 2010s ===
Year	Song	Film	Recipient(s)
2010	"You Haven't Seen the Last of Me"	Burlesque	Diane Warren
2010	"If I Rise"	127 Hours	A.R. Rahman, Dido, Rollo Armstrong
2010	"Alice"	Alice in Wonderland	Avril Lavigne
2010	"Country Strong"	Country Strong	Jennifer Hanson, Mark Nesler, Tony Martin
2010	"What Part of Forever"	The Twilight Saga: Eclipse	Cee Lo Green, Oh, Hush!, Rob Kleiner
2010	"Eclipse (All Yours)"	The Twilight Saga: Eclipse	Emily Haines, Howard Shore, James Shaw
2011	"Lay Your Head Down"	Albert Nobbs	Brian Byrne, Glenn Close
2011	"Bridge of Light"	Happy Feet Two	Pink, Billy Mann
2011	"Gathering Stories"	We Bought a Zoo	Jónsi, Cameron Crowe
2011	"Hello Hello"	Gnomeo & Juliet	Elton John, Bernie Taupin
2011	"Life's a Happy Song"	The Muppets	Bret McKenzie
2011	"Man or Muppet"	The Muppets	Bret McKenzie
2012	"Suddenly"	Les Misérables	Claude-Michel Schönberg, Alain Boublil, Herbert Kretzmer
2012	"Fire in the Blood/Snake Song"	Lawless	Emmylou Harris, Nick Cave, Warren Ellis
2012	"Learn Me Right"	Brave	Birdy, Mumford and Sons
2012	"Love Always Comes as a Surprise"	Madagascar 3: Europe's Most Wanted	Peter Asher, Dave Stewart
2012	"Skyfall"	Skyfall	Adele, Paul Epworth
2012	"Still Alive"	Paul Williams: Still Alive	Paul Williams
2013	"Young and Beautiful"	The Great Gatsby	Lana Del Rey, Daniel Heath
2013	"Happy"	Despicable Me 2	Pharrell Williams
2013	"I See Fire"	The Hobbit: The Desolation of Smaug	Ed Sheeran
2013	"Let it Go"	Frozen	Kristen Anderson-Lopez, Robert Lopez
2013	"Please, Mr. Kennedy"	Inside Llewyn Davis	Ed Rush, George Cromarty, T Bone Burnett, Justin Timberlake, Joel and Ethan Coen
2013	"So You Know What It's Like"	Short Term 12	Lakeith Stanfield, Destin Daniel Cretton
2014	"We Will Not Go"	Virunga	J. Ralph
2014	"Everything is Awesome"	The Lego Movie	Shawn Patterson, Bartholomew, Lisa Harriton, Akiva Schaffer, Andy Samberg, Jorma Taccone
2014	"I'll Get You What You Want (Cockatoo in Malibu)"	Muppets Most Wanted	Bret McKenzie
2014	"I'm Not Gonna Miss You"	Glen Campbell: I'll Be Me	Glen Campbell, Julian Raymond
2014	"Split the Difference"	Boyhood	Ethan Hawke
2014	"What Is Love"	Rio 2	Nate 'Rocket' Wonder, Roman GianArthur Irvin, Janelle Monáe
2015	"Til It Happens to You"	The Hunting Ground	Lady Gaga, Diane Warren
2015	"Cold One"	Ricki and the Flash	Jenny Lewis, Johnathan Rice
2015	"Love Me Like You Do"	Fifty Shades of Grey	Max Martin, Savan Kotecha, Ilya Salmanzadeh, Ali Payami, Tove Nilsson
2015	"One Kind of Love"	Love & Mercy	Brian Wilson
2015	"See You Again"	Furious 7	DJ Frank E, Charlie Puth, Wiz Khalifa, Andrew Cedar
2015	"Writing's on the Wall"	Spectre	Sam Smith, Jimmy Napes
2016	"City of Stars"	La La Land	Justin Hurwitz, Pasek and Paul
2016	"Can't Stop the Feeling!"	Trolls	Max Martin, Shellback, Justin Timberlake
2016	"Dancing with Your Shadow"	Po	Burt Bacharach, Billy Mann
2016	"Audition"	La La Land	Justin Hurwitz, Pasek and Paul
2016	"I'm Still Here"	Miss Sharon Jones!	Sharon Jones
2016	"Runnin'"	Hidden Figures	Pharrell Williams
2017	"Stand Up for Something"	Marshall	Common, Diane Warren
2017	"I Don't Wanna Live Forever"	Fifty Shades Darker	Taylor Swift, Sam Dew, Jack Antonoff
2017	"It Ain't Fair"	Detroit	Raymond Angry, Phonte, Black Thought, Questlove
2017	"Prayers for This World"	Cries from Syria	Diane Warren
2017	"The Promise"	The Promise	Chris Cornell
2017	"Truth to Power"	An Inconvenient Sequel: Truth to Power	Ryan Tedder
2018	"Shallow"	A Star Is Born	Lady Gaga, Andrew Wyatt, Anthony Rossomando, Mark Ronson
2018	"All the Stars"	Black Panther	Kendrick Lamar, Sounwave, Al Shux, SZA, Anthony Tiffith
2018	"Can You Imagine That?"	Mary Poppins Returns	Marc Shaiman, Scott Wittman
2018	"Requiem for a Private War"	A Private War	Annie Lennox
2018	"Revelation"	Boy Erased	Troye Sivan, Brett McLaughlin, Jónsi
2018	"Strawberries & Cigarettes"	Love, Simon	Troye Sivan, Jack Antonoff, Alex Hope
2019	"(I'm Gonna) Love Me Again"	Rocketman	Elton John, Bernie Taupin
2019	"Don't Call Me Angel"	Charlie's Angels	Ariana Grande, Max Martin, Savan Kotecha, Ilya Salmanzadeh, Miley Cyrus, Alma-Sofia Miettinen, Lana Del Rey
2019	"Into the Unknown"	Frozen 2	Kristen Anderson-Lopez, Robert Lopez
2019	"Spirit"	The Lion King	Ilya Salmanzadeh, Labrinth, Beyoncé Knowles
2019	"Swan Song"	Alita: Battle Angel	Dua Lipa, Justin Tranter, Kennedi Lykken, Mattias Larsson, Robin Fredriksson, Tom Holkenborg
2019	"The Ballad of the Lonesome Cowboy"	Toy Story 4	Randy Newman

=== 2020s ===
Year	Song	Film	Recipient(s)
2020	"Io sì (Seen)"	The Life Ahead	Niccolò Agliardi, Laura Pausini, Diane Warren
2020	"Everybody Cries"	The Outpost	Larry Groupé, Rod Lurie, Rita Wilson
2020	"Hear My Voice"	The Trial of the Chicago 7	Daniel Pemberton, Celeste
2020	"The Other Side"	Trolls World Tour	Justin Timberlake
2020	"Rocket to the Moon"	Over the Moon	Christopher Curtis, Marjorie Duffield, Helen Park
2020	"Speak Now"	One Night in Miami...	Sam Ashworth, Leslie Odom Jr.
2021	"Colombia, Mi Encanto"	Encanto	Lin-Manuel Miranda
2021	"Be Alive"	King Richard	Beyoncé Knowles-Carter, DIXSON
2021	"Beyond the Shore"	CODA	Nicholai Baxter, Matt Dahan, Marius de Vries, Sian Heder
2021	"Down to Joy"	Belfast	Van Morrison
2021	"Here I Am (Singing My Way Home)"	Respect	Jamie Alexander Hartman, Jennifer Hudson, Carole King
2021	"No Time to Die"	No Time to Die	Billie Eilish, Finneas O'Connell
2022	"Hold My Hand"	Top Gun: Maverick	Lady Gaga
2022	"Applause"	Tell It Like a Woman	Diane Warren
2022	"Carolina"	Where the Crawdads Sing	Taylor Swift
2022	"Lift Me Up"	Black Panther: Wakanda Forever	Rihanna
2022	"Naatu Naatu"	RRR	Kaala Bhairava, M. M. Keeravani, and Rahul Sipligunj
2022	"Vegas"	Elvis	Doja Cat
2023	"What Was I Made For?"	Barbie	Billie Eilish, Finneas O'Connell
2023	"I'm Just Ken"	Barbie	Mark Ronson and Andrew Wyatt
2023	"It Never Went Away"	American Symphony	Jon Batiste and Dan Wilson
2023	"Peaches"	The Super Mario Bros. Movie	Jack Black, Aaron Horvath, Michael Jelenic, Eric Osmond and John Spiker
2023	"Road to Freedom"	Rustin	Lenny Kravitz
2023	"The Fire Inside"	Flamin' Hot	Diane Warren
2024	"Mi Camino"	Emilia Pérez	Clément Ducol and Camille
2024	"El Mal"	Emilia Pérez	Clément Ducol and Camille
2024	"The Journey"	The Six Triple Eight	Diane Warren
2024	"Kiss the Sky"	The Wild Robot	Maren Morris, Delacey, Jordan Johnson, Stefan Johnson, Michael Pollack, and Ali Tamposi
2024	"Never Too Late"	Elton John: Never Too Late	Elton John and Brandi Carlile
2024	"Winter Coat"	Blitz	Nicholas Britell, Steve McQueen, and Taura Stinson
2025	"Dream as One"	Avatar: Fire and Ash	Miley Cyrus, Andrew Wyatt, Mark Ronson, and Simon Franglen
2025	"The Girl in the Bubble"	Wicked: For Good	Stephen Schwartz
2025	"Golden"	KPop Demon Hunters	Joong Gyu Kwak, Yu Han Lee, Hee Dong Nam, Jeong Hoon Seo, Park Hong Jun, Kim Eun-jae (EJAE), and Mark Sonnenblick
2025	"I Lied to You"	Sinners	Ludwig Göransson and Raphael Saadiq
2025	"No Place Like Home"	Wicked: For Good	Stephen Schwartz
2025	"Train Dreams"	Train Dreams	Nick Cave and Bryce Dessner
