= Avatar: Fire and Ash =

2025 film by James Cameron

- Theatrical release poster
- Directed by: James Cameron
- Screenplay by: James Cameron; Rick Jaffa Amanda Silver
- Story by: James Cameron; Rick Jaffa; Amanda Silver; Josh Friedman; Shane Salerno
- Produced by: James Cameron; Jon Landau
- Starring: Sam Worthington; Zoe Saldaña; Sigourney Weaver; Stephen Lang; Kate Winslet
- Cinematography: Russell Carpenter
- Edited by: Stephen E. Rivkin (Note: Credited as Stephen Rivkin); Nicolas de Toth; John Refoua; Jason Gaudio; James Cameron; David Brenner
- Music by: Simon Franglen (Note: Original Avatar themes by James Horner)
- Production company: Lightstorm Entertainment
- Distributed by: 20th Century Studios
- Release dates: December 1, 2025 (Dolby Theatre); December 19, 2025 (United States)
- Running time: 197 minutes
- Country: United States
- Language: English
- Budget: $350–400 million (Note: Attributed to multiple references:)
- Box office: $1.490 billion

Avatar: Fire and Ash is a 2025 American epic science fiction film directed by James Cameron from a screenplay he co-wrote with Rick Jaffa and Amanda Silver. Produced by Lightstorm Entertainment, it is the third installment in the Avatar film series and the sequel to Avatar: The Way of Water (2022). The film features Sam Worthington, Zoe Saldaña, Sigourney Weaver, Stephen Lang, and Kate Winslet reprising their roles from previous films. The story follows the human-turned-Na'vi Jake Sully and his family on the habitable moon Pandora, as they face the combined threat of the human RDA forces and the Mangkwan, a ruthless Na'vi clan.

Following the box office success of Avatar (2009), Cameron announced two sequels, with Avatar 3 aiming for a December 2015 release. However, the addition of two further sequels and the development of new performance capture technology required to film scenes underwater led to significant delays to allow the crew more time to work on writing, pre-production, and visual effects. Avatar: Fire and Ash started shooting simultaneously with The Way of Water in New Zealand on September 25, 2017, and filming wrapped in late December 2020. With an estimated production budget of at least $350 million, it is one of the most expensive films ever made.

Avatar: Fire and Ash had its world premiere at Dolby Theatre in Hollywood, on December 1, 2025, and was released in the United States on December 19 by 20th Century Studios. It received mixed to positive reviews from critics, who praised its visual effects, action sequences and spectacle, but criticized its runtime and script. The film grossed $1.490 billion worldwide, becoming the third-highest-grossing film of 2025 and the lowest-grossing film of the Avatar series. It won awards for its visual effects at the 98th Academy Awards and 79th British Academy Film Awards, and was named one of the top ten films of 2025 by the American Film Institute and the National Board of Review. Two sequels, Avatar 4 and Avatar 5, are scheduled for release in 2029 and 2031, respectively.

== Plot ==
Shortly after the death of Jake and Neytiri's eldest son Neteyam, (Note: As depicted in Avatar: The Way of Water (2022)) the Sully family grieves amongst the Metkayina, with Neytiri developing a deeper hatred toward humans. After Spider's breathing mask runs out of power during his sleep, Jake and Neytiri decide he must return to the human scientist camp for his safety. The Sully family accompanies him on the trip aboard a fleet of merchant airships.

The merchant convoy is ambushed by raiders of the Mangkwan, an aggressive Na'vi clan. Led by their matriarch Varang, the Mangkwan loot and set fire to the ships, killing many and scattering the Sully family. After Miles Quaritch captures Jake, the two work together to locate Spider. Meanwhile, Spider collapses when his mask loses power, motivating Jake's adopted daughter Kiri to spontaneously infuse his body with mycelia, which gives him the ability to breathe Pandora's air.

The Mangkwan capture Quaritch, Jake and the children, after which Quaritch teaches Varang how to use firearms. Kiri commands nearby flora to kill their guards, enabling everyone to escape. The human scientists Norm Spellman and Max Patel believe Spider's mycelia could be reverse engineered to allow other humans to breathe on Pandora. Kiri learns that she was born from Eywa, but is blocked from connecting with her. Quaritch offers guns and flamethrowers to the Mangkwan and convinces them to form an alliance, then begins an intimate relationship with Varang.

Kiri helps Spider explore his newfound ability to neurally connect with other organisms, and they share a kiss. Quaritch captures Spider and then arrives at the Metkayina village with the Mangkwan, demanding that Jake turn himself in. Jake surrenders to avoid bloodshed, and he and Spider are taken to the Resources Development Administration (RDA) base. Jake's son Lo'ak searches for Payakan ahead of a Tulkun congregation that will be targeted by RDA hunters. RDA biologist Ian Garvin urges the hunters to back down, but he is ignored.

Spider undergoes testing by RDA scientists, while Jake is scheduled to be executed. Neytiri infiltrates the RDA base, Spider manages to escape his cell, and Garvin frees Jake. After Jake, Neytiri and Spider escape, Jake regretfully prepares to kill Spider so the RDA cannot learn more about his breathing abilities. However, Jake cannot bring himself to kill him, and they embrace.

At the Metkayina village, the Tulkun council hear Jake's warning about an impending massacre, but decide not to change their pacifist ways. However, when Lo'ak brings Payakan and Ta'nok, both disfigured Tulkun hunting raid survivors, the Tulkun elders reconsider. Jake re-bonds with the apex predator Toruk and rallies the Na'vi clans to battle. When the RDA fleet arrives for the hunt, the Tulkun and Na'vi ambush them. However, Quaritch and the Mangkwan arrive and turn the tide in their favor. The Metkayina matriarch Ronal is wounded and dies in childbirth, with Neytiri delivering her baby daughter, Pril, before being captured.

With the help of Spider and Jake's daughter Tuk, Kiri finally communicates with Eywa and pleads for help. In answer, the Pandoran wildlife ambush the rest of the RDA forces, saving the cornered Tulkun. Varang tries to kill Neytiri, but is repelled by Kiri. Ta'nok kills the lead Tulkun hunter Mick Scorseby. Jake and Quaritch are thrown into a magnetic flux, which is destroying the remaining RDA vessels. As Jake and Quaritch fight, Spider falls off a floating rock, forcing them to work together to save him. When Neytiri and her children arrive, Quaritch throws himself off the rock.

After the battle, Spider and the Metkayina connect to the underwater spirit trees, where Spider meets all the deceased Na'vi. Kiri introduces Spider to her mother, Grace, and they initiate him into the Na'vi people.

== Cast ==
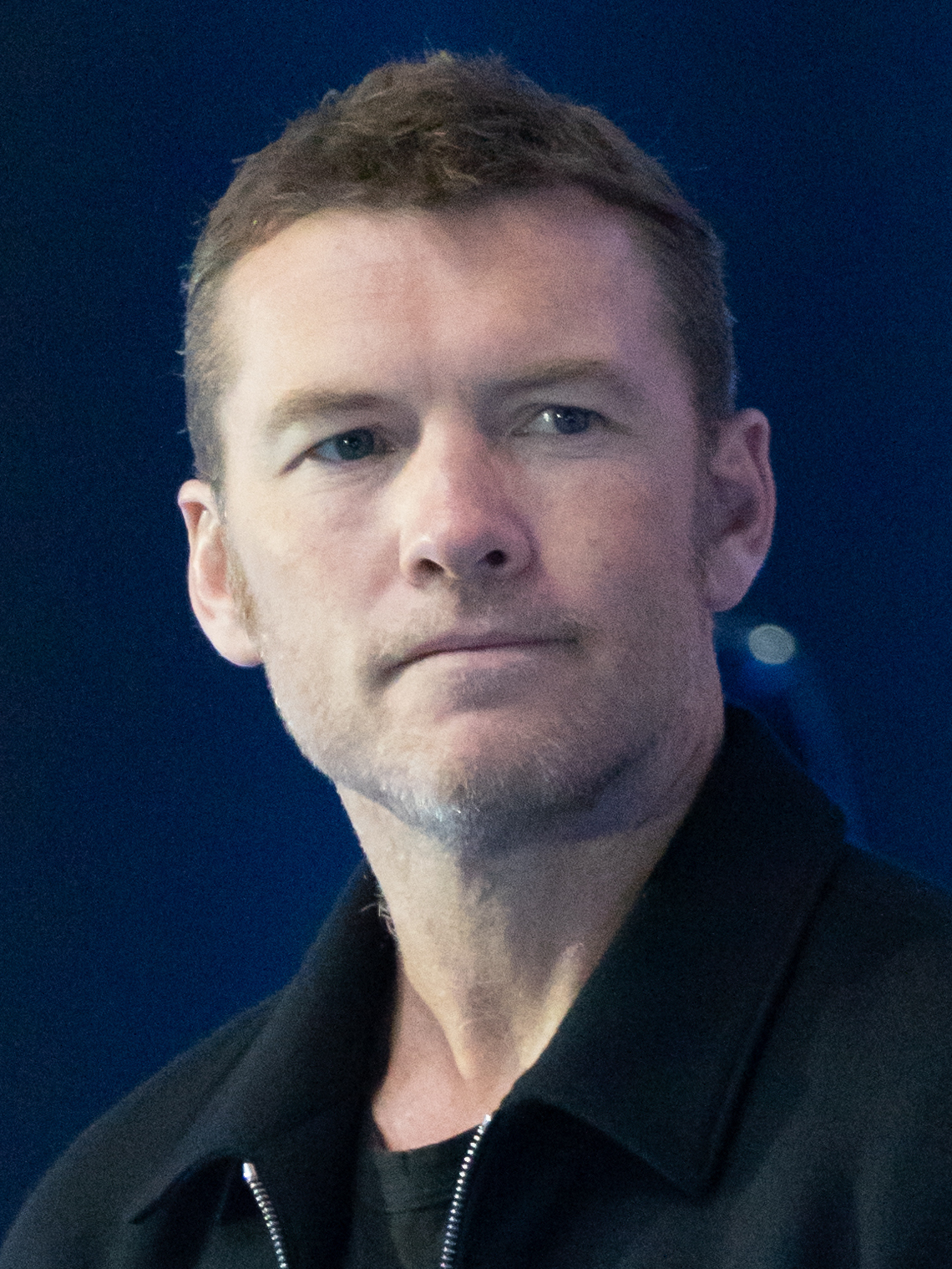
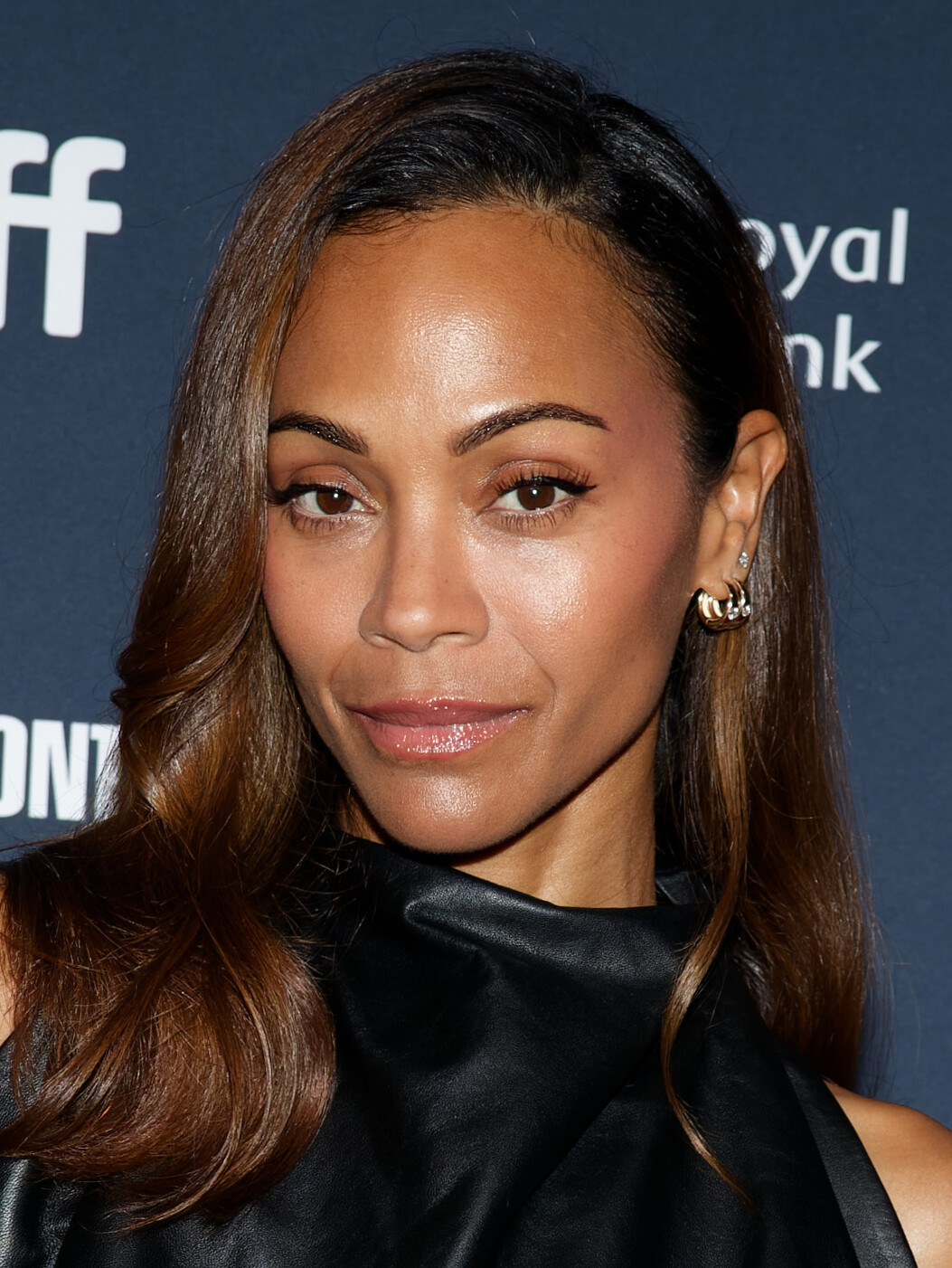
Sam Worthington (left) and Zoe Saldaña reprise their roles from the previous two films.
- Sam Worthington as Jake Sully: A human who was transferred into a Na'vi body and led the effort to drive the RDA off Pandora. In the second film, he and his family joined the Metkayina clan.
- Zoe Saldaña as Neytiri: A Na'vi warrior and Jake's wife. Saldaña said Neytiri becomes a "full-blown racist" toward humans in Fire and Ash.
- Sigourney Weaver as Kiri: Jake and Neytiri's adopted daughter who was born from Dr. Grace Augustine's inert Na'vi avatar. Weaver also reprised her role as Augustine, who appears in visions.
- Stephen Lang as Colonel Miles Quaritch: A former human commander of the RDA security forces who was killed by Neytiri, then resurrected as a Na'vi recombinant.
- Oona Chaplin as Varang: The leader of the warmongering Mangkwan clan of Na'vi. (Note: Attributed to multiple references:) Cameron said Varang's clan experienced "an incredible hardship" which "hardened" her. He explained that she "will do anything for them, even things that we would consider to be evil".
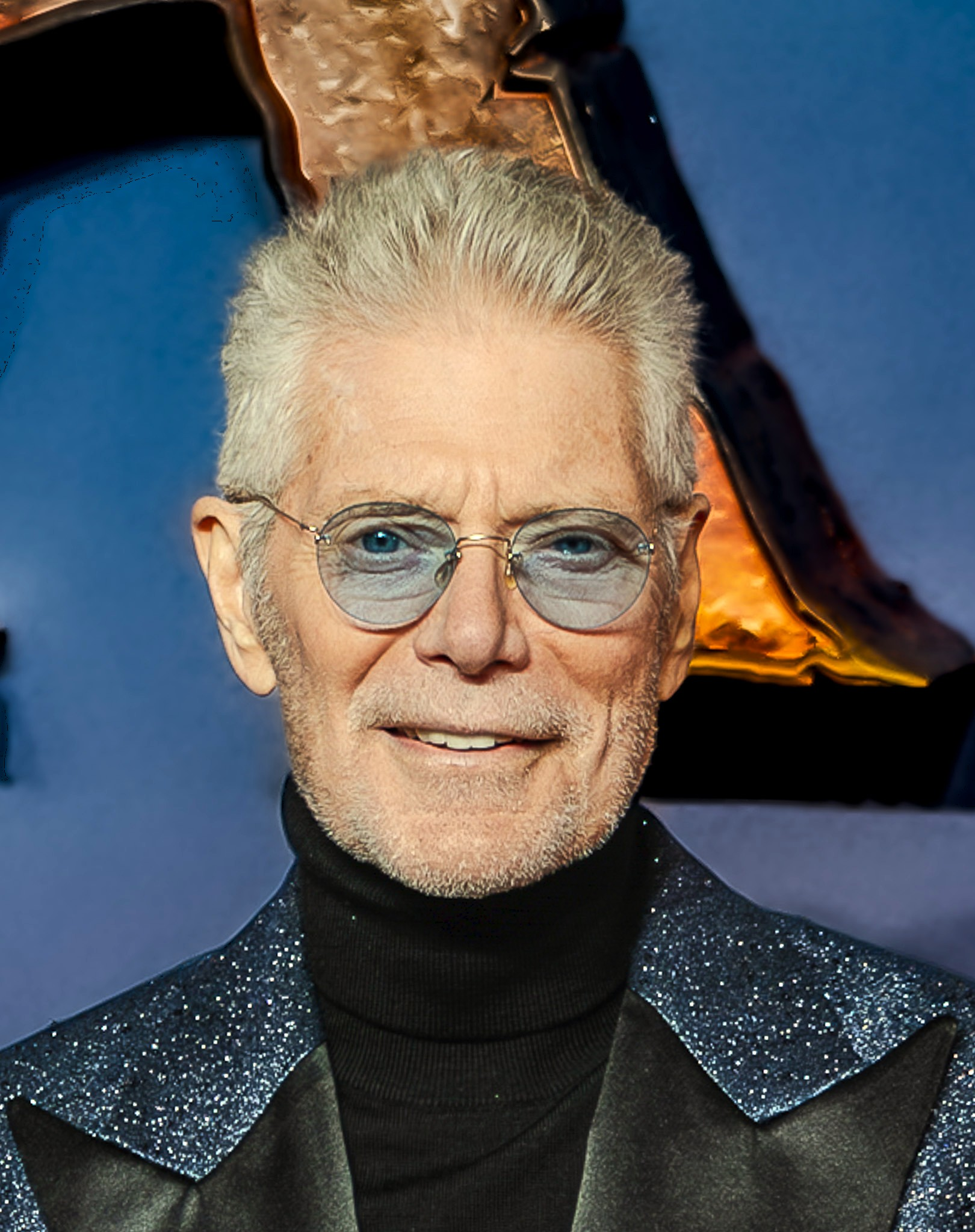
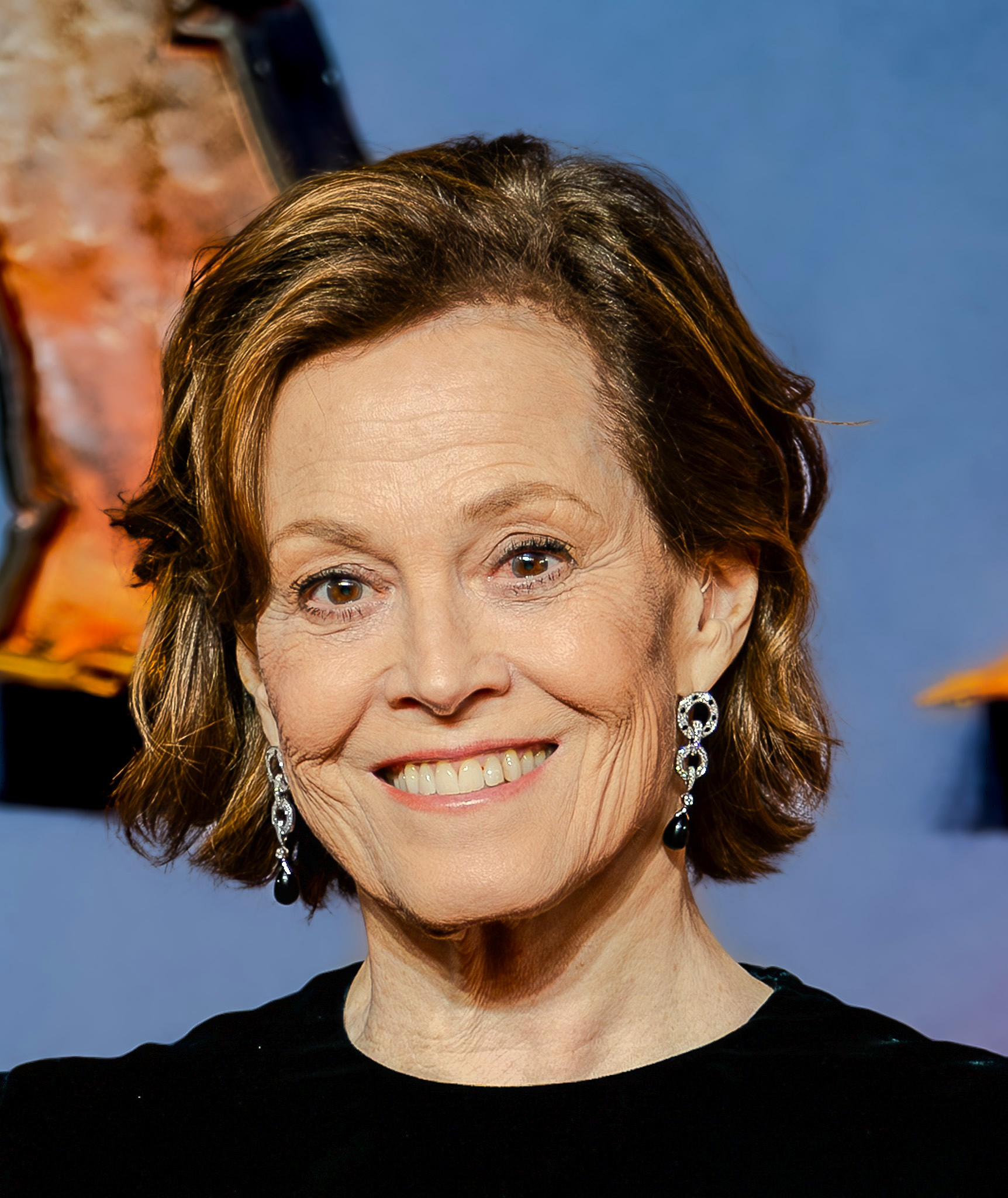
Stephen Lang (left) and Sigourney Weaver have appeared in all three Avatar films.
- Cliff Curtis as Tonowari: Chief of the Metkayina, Ronal's husband, and the father of Tsireya and Aonung.
- Joel David Moore as Dr. Norm Spellman: A human scientist and ally of the Na'vi who stayed on Pandora when the RDA was driven off.
- CCH Pounder as Mo'at: The Omaticaya's spiritual leader and Neytiri's mother.
- Edie Falco as General Frances Ardmore: Commander of the RDA's military operations and Quaritch's superior.
- David Thewlis as Peylak: The Na'vi leader of the merchant Wind Traders. (Note: Attributed to multiple references:)
- Jemaine Clement as Dr. Ian Garvin: A marine biologist employed by Scoresby.
- Giovanni Ribisi as Parker Selfridge: The former administrator of the RDA mining operation. (Note: Attributed to multiple references:)
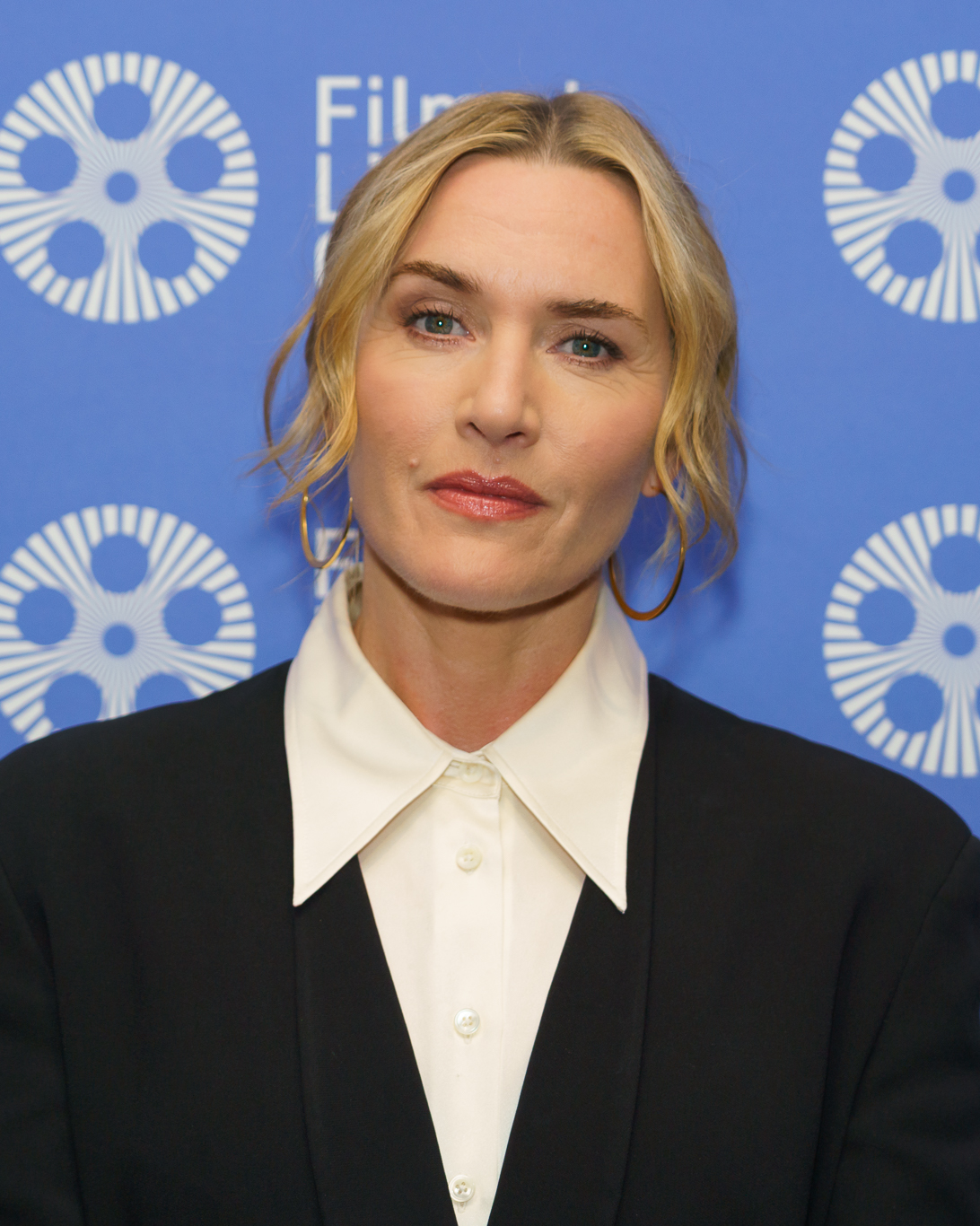
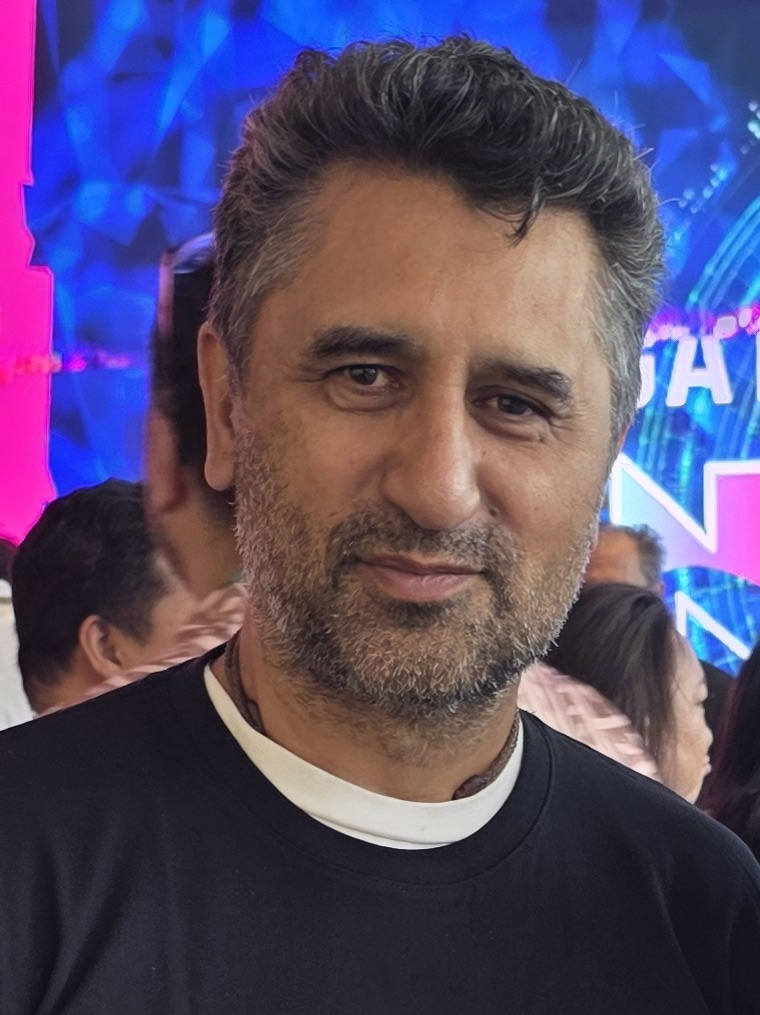
Kate Winslet (left) and Cliff Curtis reprise their roles from Avatar: The Way of Water.
- Kate Winslet as Ronal: The pregnant wife of Tonowari, chief of the Metkayina reef clan. (Note: Attributed to multiple references:)
- Britain Dalton as Lo'ak: Jake and Neytiri's son who formed a bond with the outcast Tulkun Payakan. (Note: Attributed to multiple references:)
- Jamie Flatters as Neteyam: Jake and Neytiri's older son who died in battle and now appears in visions.
- Trinity Jo-Li Bliss as Tuktirey ("Tuk"): Jake and Neytiri's daughter and their youngest child. (Note: Attributed to multiple references:)
- Jack Champion as Miles "Spider" Socorro: The teenaged human son of Quaritch who was adopted by Jake and Neytiri. (Note: Attributed to multiple references:)
- Brendan Cowell as Captain Mick Scoresby: A hunter of the whale-like Tulkun.
- Bailey Bass as Tsireya: The daughter of Ronal and Tonowari. (Note: Attributed to multiple references:)
- Filip Geljo as Aonung: The son of Ronal and Tonowari. (Note: Attributed to multiple references:)
- Duane Evans Jr. as Rotxo: A Metkayina youth.
- Matt Gerald as Corporal Lyle Wainfleet: An RDA soldier who died and was resurrected as a Na'vi recombinant.
- Dileep Rao as Dr. Max Patel: A human scientist and ally of the Na'vi who stayed on Pandora when the RDA was driven off.

Briefly reprising their roles from the first film are Wes Studi as Eytukan, the chief of the Omaticaya and Neytiri's father, and Laz Alonso as Tsu'tey, Eytukan's successor.

== Production ==
=== Development ===
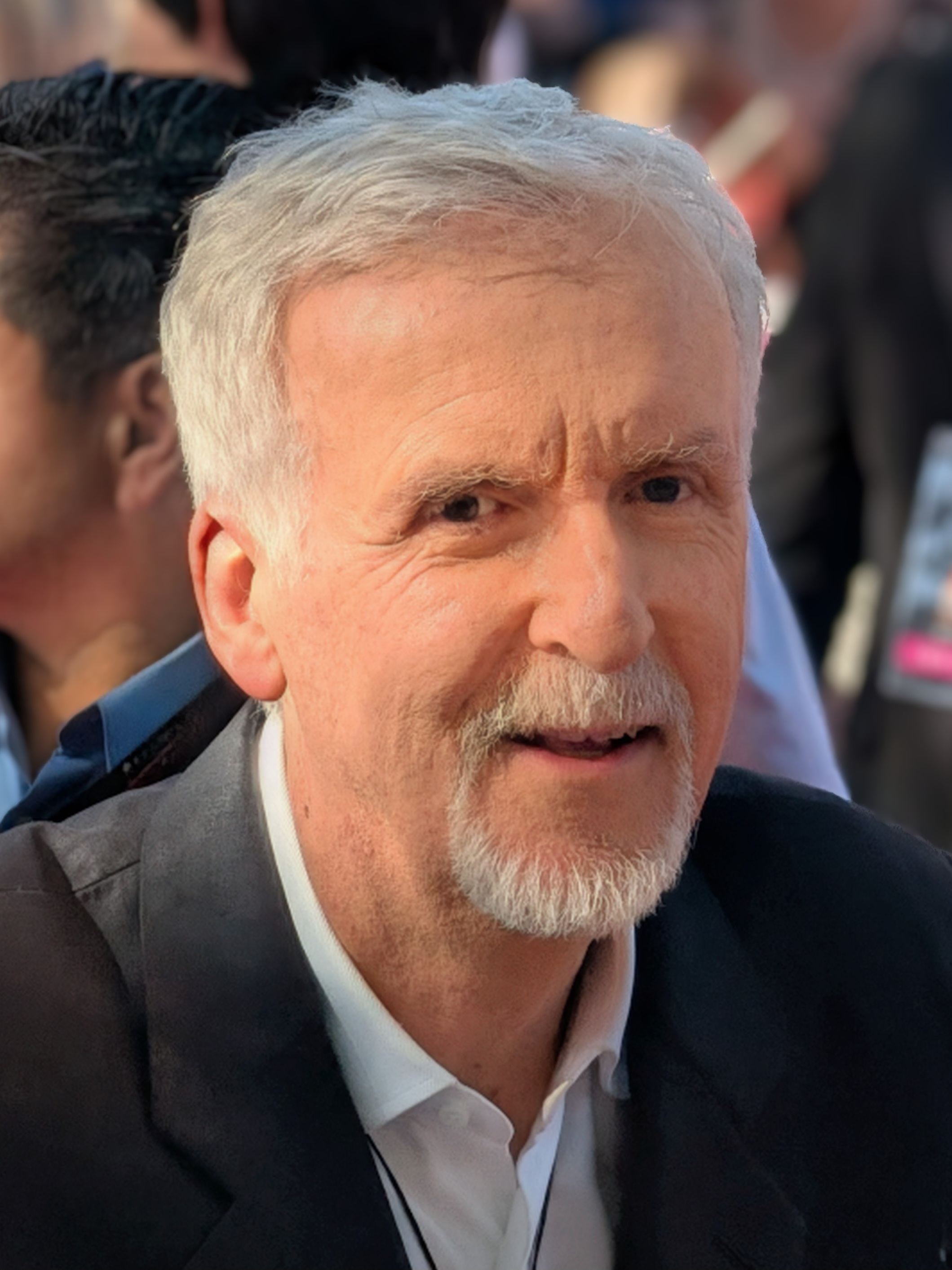
James Cameron at the Wellington premiere of the film in December 2025

Following the box office success of Avatar (2009), Cameron announced two sequels, which were originally scheduled for release in 2014 and 2015. (Note: Attributed to multiple references:) He said he would shoot the sequels back-to-back and at a higher frame rate than the industry standard 24 frames per second, in order to add a heightened sense of reality. (Note: Attributed to multiple references:) In late 2013, he revealed that the sequels would be filmed in New Zealand, with performance capture filming to take place in 2014. An agreement with the New Zealand government required at least one world premiere to be held in Wellington and at least NZ$500 million (roughly US$410 million) to be spent on production activity in New Zealand, including live-action filming and visual effects. The government announced it would raise its baseline tax rebate for filmmaking from 15% to 20%, with 25% available to international productions in some cases.

By February 2016, production of the sequels was scheduled to begin that April. New crew members for the sequels included cinematographer Russell Carpenter, who worked with Cameron on True Lies (1994) and Titanic (1997), and art director Aashrita Kamath. (Note: Attributed to multiple references:) Kirk Krack, founder of Performance Freediving International, worked as a freediving trainer for the cast and crew for the underwater scenes. On July 31, 2017, it was announced that the New Zealand-based visual effects studio Weta Digital had commenced work on the Avatar sequels.

In a 2023 interview, Cameron announced that the film would feature a new Na'vi clan, called the "Ash people", who would be antagonists in the film. On August 9, 2024, the title of the film was announced by Cameron at the D23 Disney fan convention. Cameron said "fire" refers to anger, hatred and violence, while "ash" refers to grief and loss.

=== Writing ===
Rick Jaffa and Amanda Silver were originally announced as Cameron's co-writers. It was later announced that Jaffa, Silver, Josh Friedman, and Shane Salerno all played a role in the writing process for all the films before being assigned to finish separate scripts. (Note: Attributed to multiple references:) According to Cameron, Fire and Ash was split from Avatar: The Way of Water due to an excessive amount of material.

When writing Fire and Ash, Cameron prioritized character development over novel spectacles. He introduced the Mangkwan, or "Ash People"—a ruthless, warmongering clan of Na'vi inspired by the Baining people of Papua New Guinea—because he wanted the film series to move beyond the paradigm of "all humans are bad, all Na'vi are good". (Note: Attributed to multiple references:) He said the nomadic merchant Wind Traders were inspired by camel caravans of the Spice Road during the Middle Ages.

After the 2022 Uvalde school shooting in Texas, Cameron rewrote parts of Fire and Ash to avoid glorifying gun violence and "fetishizing" assault weapons. Originally, the Metkayina decided to use guns to defend the Tulkun, but Cameron changed the script, choosing to have the clan reject firearms instead. Cameron said he did not want guns to "contaminate" the Na'vi culture. After audiences responded positively to the Tulkun character Payakan in The Way of Water, Cameron made changes to Fire and Ash so he would be featured more prominently in the story.

=== Casting ===
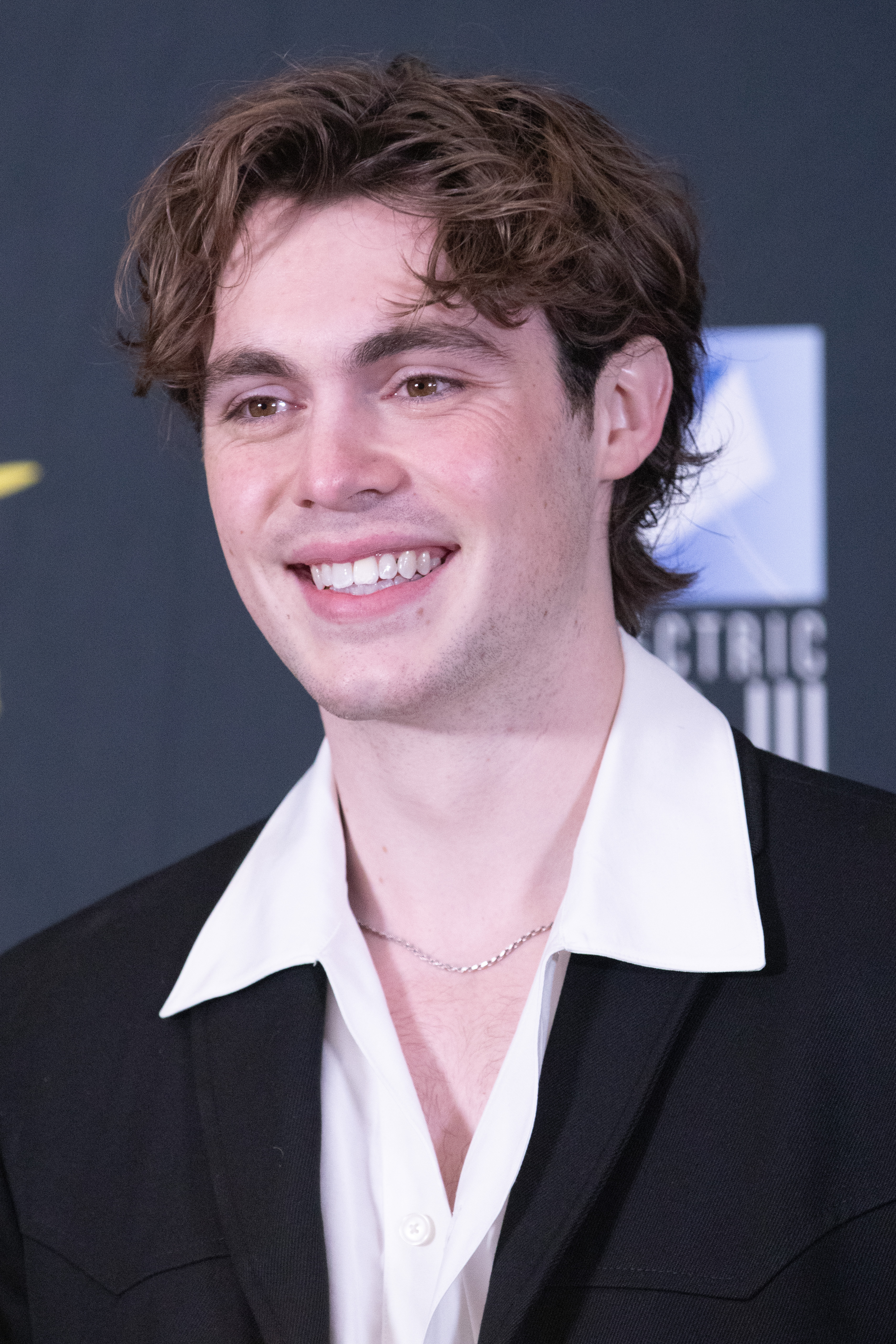
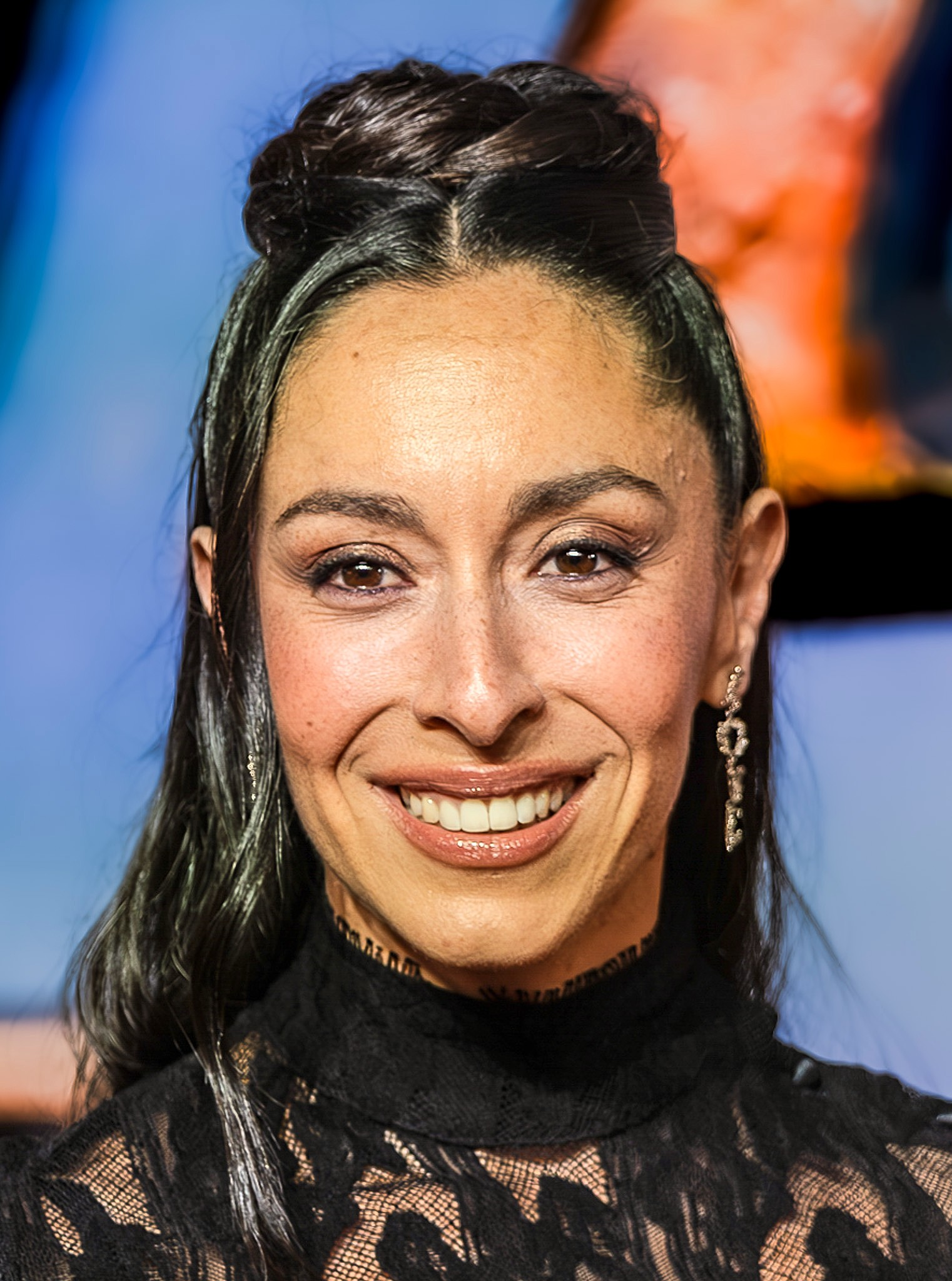
Jack Champion (left) reprised his role as "Spider" while Oona Chaplin joined the cast as Varang, leader of the Mangkwan clan.

When they were cast for Avatar, Sam Worthington and Zoe Saldaña had signed on for future sequels. In 2014, Cameron said that Sigourney Weaver would appear in the sequels as a living Grace Augustine; it was later revealed she would instead be playing Kiri, Jake and Neytiri's adopted daughter. In August 2017, Cameron announced that Stephen Lang would be the main antagonist in all four sequels. The same month, Matt Gerald was confirmed to be returning as Corporal Lyle Wainfleet in all upcoming sequels. In October, it was reported that Kate Winslet, who starred in Cameron's film Titanic (1997), had joined the cast of Avatar 2, and possibly its sequels, as a character named Ronal. (Note: Attributed to multiple references:) Cameron said that working with Winslet on Titanic had been a highlight of his career and that the two of them had been hoping to collaborate again someday. (Note: Attributed to multiple references:) However, Winslet had also been hesitant to work with Cameron again because of the rigorous situations he creates for his actors; she felt her role was strong and well-written.

In June 2017, Oona Chaplin joined the cast as Varang. Although the details of her character were not revealed, Cameron stated that she would appear in "the entire saga of the sequels" starting with Fire and Ash. Eiza González also auditioned for the role. Cameron said that Chaplin was able to express Varang's fury, sexuality, and "dominating psychology" better than other candidates for the role. In January 2018, Dileep Rao was confirmed to return as Dr. Max Patel. In April 2018, David Thewlis announced his involvement in the Avatar franchise. In 2020, he announced that he would be playing a Na'vi character in the third, fourth, and fifth films. (Note: Attributed to multiple references:)

=== Filming ===
Principal photography began simultaneously with The Way of Water on September 25, 2017, in Manhattan Beach, California. On November 14, 2018, Cameron announced that performance capture filming with the principal cast had been completed. Live-action filming for The Way of Water and Fire and Ash commenced in New Zealand in early 2019. On March 17, 2020, Landau announced that filming in New Zealand had been postponed indefinitely in response to the COVID-19 pandemic. However, virtual production continued in Manhattan Beach and visual effects work continued at Weta Digital in Wellington.

In early May, health and safety production protocols had been endorsed by the New Zealand government, allowing filming to resume in the country. On May 31, part of the Avatar crew, including Cameron, were granted entry into New Zealand under a special visa category for border exemptions for foreigners deemed essential to a project of "significant economic value". On June 1, 2020, Landau posted a picture of himself and Cameron on Instagram, showing that they had returned to New Zealand to resume filming. After their arrival, all 55 crew members who had traveled to New Zealand started a 2-week government-supervised isolation period at a hotel in Wellington before they could resume filming. This would make Avatar: The Way of Water and Avatar: Fire and Ash the first major Hollywood blockbusters to resume production after postponing filming due to the pandemic. (Note: Attributed to multiple references:) In September 2020, Cameron announced that 95% of Avatar: Fire and Ash had been completed. Filming wrapped in December.

Following the December 2022 release of The Way of Water, Cameron decided to partially rewrite Fire and Ash to incorporate scenes involving the creature Toruk, which was introduced in Avatar. Cameron also expanded the role of the whale-like character Payakan after he proved popular in The Way of Water. In February 2024, Cameron said principal photography was essentially completed and that the crew was shooting pick-ups for Fire and Ash.

== Music ==
In August 2021, Landau announced that Simon Franglen would compose the score for the Avatar sequels. In October 2025, it was announced that an original song for the film, titled "Dream as One", would be written by Miley Cyrus with Mark Ronson and Andrew Wyatt. The song was released on November 14, 2025, and plays during the end credits. The Fire and Ash soundtrack was released on December 5, 2025. A second original song, "The Future and the Past", composed by Franglen and sung by Saldaña in the fictional Naʼvi language, closes the album.

== Marketing ==
It was reported that the marketing budget for Fire and Ash was approximately $150 million. In late July 2025, the film's teaser trailer was released online and in theaters before screenings of The Fantastic Four: First Steps. A full trailer was released on September 25.

In October 2025, Avatar: The Way of Water was re-released in theaters, with one of three clips from Fire and Ash randomly inserted as a mid-credits scene. One of the scenes showed Quaritch approaching an encampment of Ash Na'vi and having a confrontation with Varang. Another of the scenes showed Sully's family boarding a Windtrader ship and meeting with Peylak. A third scene started with the Sully family flying in the Windtrader ships when they are attacked by Ash Na'vi.

== Release ==
=== Theatrical ===
Avatar: Fire and Ash was released in the United States and Canada on December 19, 2025, by 20th Century Studios. (Note: Attributed to multiple references:) Like its predecessor, the film was subject to multiple delays (in this case, nine in total) as the crew needed more time for writing, pre-production and visual effects. Its release was originally scheduled for December 2015, but was pushed back multiple times until its final release date of December 19, 2025 was confirmed. (Note: Attributed to multiple references:) Both the COVID-19 pandemic and the 2023 Writers Guild of America strike played a role in the delays. (Note: Attributed to multiple references:)

The Australian premiere of the film that was scheduled for December 15 was cancelled after the 2025 Bondi Beach shooting. In Hong Kong, the release was delayed until January 8, 2026 due to the Wang Fuk Court fire, making Hong Kong the last territory worldwide to receive a release. The subtitle Fire and Ash was removed in Hong Kong to avoid insensitivity. (Note: Attributed to multiple references:)

Avatar: Fire and Ash was released in multiple formats, including Dolby Cinema, IMAX 3D and 4DX. The 4DX format incorporates moving seats and environmental effects such as wind, water, and vibration to accompany on-screen action. (Note: Attributed to multiple references:) The film is dedicated to editor John Refoua and producer Jon Landau, who died in 2023 and 2024, respectively.

=== Home media ===
Avatar: Fire and Ash was released for digital download on March 31, 2026, with behind-the-scenes featurettes included as bonus content. The film was released on 4K Ultra HD Blu-ray, Blu-ray, Blu-ray 3D, and DVD by 20th Century Home Entertainment on May 19, 2026, (Note: Attributed to multiple references:) which marked Buena Vista Home Entertainment's final in-house physical media production label before Disney laid off its entire staff in April 2026. The film became available for streaming on Disney+ on June 24, 2026.

In the United States, Avatar: Fire and Ash topped Fandango at Home's weekly digital sales and rental chart for the week ending April 5, following its premium digital release on March 31. On physical media, it was the best-selling film of May 2026, according to Circana's VideoScan tracking service, which compiles Blu-ray and DVD sales.

Nielsen Media Research, which records streaming viewership on certain U.S. television screens, reported that Avatar: Fire and Ash was the most-streamed film between June 22–28, with 1.009 billion minutes viewed. During the following week, from June 29 to July 5, the film ranked fifth with 424 million minutes of watch time. Between July 6–12, the film accumulated a further 266 million minutes, placing sixth for the week. From July 13–19, it generated 208 million minutes of watch time, once again ranking sixth. Overall, from June 1 through July 12, Avatar: Fire and Ash was the fourth most-streamed film, with 1.699 billion minutes viewed, according to Nielsen Media Research.

== Reception ==
=== Box office ===
Avatar: Fire and Ash grossed $404.3 million in the United States and Canada, and $1.086 billion in other territories, for a worldwide total of $1.490 billion.

By December 17, 2025, prior to the film's release in the United States and Canada, Deadline Hollywood projected an opening weekend of $340–380 million worldwide; it ended up opening to $347.1 million worldwide. The film made $12 million during Thursday previews in the United States and Canada, $5 million less than the previews for Avatar: The Way of Water. It ended up grossing $89.2 million during its opening weekend in the United States and Canada. Despite leading the box office and grossing more than the 2009 film's weekend debut of $77 million, the film's opening weekend domestic gross was a significant decline from the $134.1 million made by its predecessor in 2022. In its second weekend, Avatar: Fire and Ash retained the top spot at the box office and grossed $63.1 million, a decline of 29% and smaller than its predecessor's second weekend drop of 53%. In its third weekend, Avatar: Fire and Ash once again topped box office with $41.4 million, a decline of 34%. The film topped the box office again in its fourth weekend with $21.5 million, a decline of 49%. It retained the top spot at the box office in its fifth weekend with $14.5 million, declining 33%. In its sixth weekend, Avatar: Fire and Ash was surpassed by Mercy, grossing $6.4 million.

Due to Avatar: Fire and Ash, IMAX revenue and operating earnings surged, climbing 35% to $125.2 million for the fourth quarter of 2025, compared to $92.7 million in the 2024 period. The company said that the third Avatar film, which Cameron urged moviegoers to see in IMAX, drove record box office for the quarter, contributing $112 million in ticket sales to become IMAX's highest-grossing Hollywood film.

=== Critical response ===
On the review aggregator website Rotten Tomatoes, 66% of 363 critics' reviews are positive, with an average rating of 6.3/10. The website's consensus reads: "Remaining on the cutting edge of visual effects, Fire and Ash repeats the narrative beats of its predecessors to frustrating effect, but its grand spectacle continues to stoke one-of-a-kind thrills." Metacritic, which uses a weighted average, assigned the film a score of 61 out of 100, based on 59 critics, indicating "generally favorable" reviews. Audiences polled by CinemaScore gave the film an average grade of "A" on an A+ to F scale, the same grade as the previous two films.

Publications characterized the film's critical reception as ranging from mixed to positive. (Note: Attributed to multiple references:) Initial reactions were mostly positive, with critics calling the film an "ultimate cinematic spectacle", though there was criticism of the plot. (Note: Attributed to multiple references:) Pete Hammond of Deadline Hollywood praised the film's technical aspects, calling it "a true epic" and "a visual knockout". Max Scoville of IGN wrote that it "isn't the technical leap forward that its predecessor was, which is to be expected after three years instead of thirteen. But what it lacks in novelty, it more than makes up for with refinement on every level." David Ehrlich of IndieWire wrote that it "lack[s] the unprecedented spectacle of its predecessors", adding that it "feels like something you've already seen before", though "naturally finds a way to make [the] journey feel novel and invigorating at times".

Owen Gleiberman of Variety called it a "bolder and tighter" film than its predecessor, praising its "dramatically focused story" and "awesome" action. While acknowledging it lacks the "visually unprecedented" feel of previous entries, he found it a deeply immersive experience. Writing for The New Yorker, Justin Chang described the film as a visually spectacular but "less transporting experience" than its predecessors. He felt the film's length offers immense visual scale, but lacks a sense of meaningful narrative progress or "passage" from one world to the next. Bilge Ebiri of Vulture declared it the "richest" film in the franchise and "the one in which we most lose ourselves, the one that makes us wonder about these characters and constantly peer into those rapturous backgrounds, trying to see forever".

Peter Bradshaw of The Guardian described Fire and Ash as a "gigantically dull hunk of nonsense". While acknowledging it as a "vast, dazzling spectacle" with "volcanic world-building" and "thunderous action", he criticized it as a long, humorless and emotionally empty experience. Stephanie Zacharek of Time wrote that with Fire and Ash, the franchise has "lost its wonder", and described the film as a "nostalgia trip" and a "calculated" form of déjà vu, suggesting the spectacle has become a tiresome, repetitive "stupor" rather than true magic. Robbie Collin of The Telegraph called the film humorless and "mind-numbing", and said it feels like a "relic of an earlier era" and suggested Cameron "is stuck in a creative cul-de-sac". Writing for The Wall Street Journal, Kyle Smith felt the film "offers little in the way of compelling drama" and called the script "ludicrously weak".

=== Accolades ===
At the 98th Academy Awards, Fire and Ash was nominated for Best Costume Design and won Best Visual Effects. Fire and Ash is the first film in the Avatar series not to be nominated for Best Picture. (Note: Attributed to multiple references:) With twelve award nominations, Fire and Ash was tied with The Fantastic Four: First Steps and Sinners for the most nominations at the 53rd Saturn Awards. Ultimately, the film won five Saturn Awards, including Best Science Fiction Film and Best Film Direction.

Awards and nominations received by Avatar: Fire and Ash
Award	Date of ceremony	Category	Recipient(s)	Result	Ref.
AARP Movies for Grownups Awards	January 10, 2026	Best Supporting Actress	Sigourney Weaver	Nominated	
Academy Awards	March 15, 2026	Best Costume Design	Deborah L. Scott	Nominated	
Academy Awards	March 15, 2026	Best Visual Effects	Joe Letteri, Richard Baneham, Eric Saindon, and Daniel Barrett	Won	
American Cinematheque Tribute to the Crafts Awards	January 16, 2026	Visual Effects	Avatar: Fire and Ash (Joe Letteri, Richard Baneham, Eric Saindon, and Daniel Barrett)	Honored	
American Film Institute Awards	December 4, 2025	Top 10 Films	Avatar: Fire and Ash	Won (Note: This award does not have a single winner, but recognizes multiple films.)	
Art Directors Guild Awards	February 28, 2026	Fantasy Feature Film	Dylan Cole and Ben Procter	Nominated	
Astra Midseason Movie Awards	July 3, 2025	Most Anticipated Film	Avatar: Fire and Ash	Nominated	
Austin Film Critics Association	December 18, 2025	Best Voice Acting/Animated/Digital Performance	Oona Chaplin	Won	
Austin Film Critics Association	December 18, 2025	Best Voice Acting/Animated/Digital Performance	Stephen Lang	Nominated	
Austin Film Critics Association	December 18, 2025	Best Voice Acting/Animated/Digital Performance	Zoe Saldaña	Nominated	
Austin Film Critics Association	December 18, 2025	Best Remake/Franchise Film	Avatar: Fire and Ash	Nominated	
Austin Film Critics Association	December 18, 2025	Best Visual Effects	Avatar: Fire and Ash	Won	
Black Reel Awards	February 16, 2026	Outstanding Voice Performance	Zoe Saldaña	Won	
British Academy Film Awards	February 22, 2026	Best Special Visual Effects	Joe Letteri, Richard Baneham, Eric Saindon, and Daniel Barrett	Won	
Chicago Film Critics Association	December 11, 2025	Best Use of Visual Effects	Avatar: Fire and Ash	Nominated	
Costume Designers Guild Awards	February 12, 2026	Excellence in Sci-Fi/Fantasy Film	Deborah L. Scott	Nominated	
Critics' Choice Awards	January 4, 2026	Best Visual Effects	Joe Letteri, Richard Baneham, Eric Saindon, and Daniel Barrett	Won	
Critics' Choice Super Awards	August 6, 2026	Best Actress in a Science Fiction/Fantasy Movie	Oona Chaplin	Nominated	
Critics' Choice Super Awards	August 6, 2026	Best Villain in a Movie	Oona Chaplin	Nominated	
Dorian Awards	March 3, 2026	Visually Striking Film of the Year	Avatar: Fire and Ash	Nominated	
Florida Film Critics Circle	December 19, 2025	Best Visual Effects	Avatar: Fire and Ash	Won	
Golden Globes	January 11, 2026	Cinematic and Box Office Achievement	Avatar: Fire and Ash	Nominated	
Golden Globes	January 11, 2026	Best Original Song	"Dream as One" (Miley Cyrus, Mark Ronson, Andrew Wyatt, and Simon Franglen)	Nominated	
Golden Trailer Awards	May 28, 2026	Best Fantasy Adventure TV Spot	"Greatest" (Walt Disney Studios / Rogue Creative Agency)	Nominated	
Golden Trailer Awards	May 28, 2026	Best Music TV Spot	"Greatest" (Walt Disney Studios / Rogue Creative Agency)	Won	
Golden Trailer Awards	May 28, 2026	Best Original Score	"Trailer 2" (Walt Disney Studios / Rogue Creative Agency)	Nominated	
Hollywood Music in Media Awards	November 19, 2025	Best Original Score in a Sci-Fi/Fantasy Film	Simon Franglen	Won	
Hollywood Music in Media Awards	November 19, 2025	Best Original Song in a Feature Film	"Dream as One" (Miley Cyrus, Mark Ronson, Andrew Wyatt, and Simon Franglen)	Nominated	
Houston Film Critics Society	January 20, 2026	Best Visual Effects	Avatar: Fire and Ash	Won	
Imagen Awards	August 21, 2026	Best Actress	Zoe Saldaña	Nominated	
International Film Music Critics Association	February 26, 2026	Score of the Year	Avatar: Fire and Ash (Simon Franglen)	Won	
International Film Music Critics Association	February 26, 2026	Composition of the Year	"The Windtraders" (Simon Franglen)	Won	
International Film Music Critics Association	February 26, 2026	Best Original Score for a Fantasy/Science Fiction Film	Avatar: Fire and Ash (Simon Franglen)	Won	
Las Vegas Film Critics Society	December 19, 2025	Best Art Direction	Avatar: Fire and Ash	Nominated	
Las Vegas Film Critics Society	December 19, 2025	Best Visual Effects	Avatar: Fire and Ash	Won	
Lumiere Awards	February 9, 2026	Best Theatrical Scene or Sequence	"Flux Devil"	Won	
MacGuffin Awards	September 12, 2026	Fantasy/Science Fiction Feature Film	Brad Elliott and Melissa Spicer	Won	
National Board of Review	December 3, 2025	Top 10 Films	Avatar: Fire and Ash	Won	
New York Film Critics Online	December 15, 2025	Best Ensemble Cast	Avatar: Fire and Ash	Nominated	
New York Film Critics Online	December 15, 2025	Best Cinematography	Russell Carpenter	Nominated	
Nickelodeon Kids' Choice Awards	November 14, 2026	Favorite Movie	Avatar: Fire and Ash	Nominated	
Nickelodeon Kids' Choice Awards	November 14, 2026	Favorite Movie Actress	Zoe Saldaña	Nominated	
Nickelodeon Kids' Choice Awards	November 14, 2026	Favorite Song from a Movie	"Dream as One" (Miley Cyrus, Mark Ronson, Andrew Wyatt, and Simon Franglen)	Nominated	
Online Film Critics Society	January 26, 2026	Best Sound Design	Avatar: Fire and Ash	Nominated	
Online Film Critics Society	January 26, 2026	Best Visual Effects	Avatar: Fire and Ash	Nominated	
Palm Springs International Film Festival	January 3, 2026	Outstanding Artistic Achievement Award	Miley Cyrus	Honored	
Phoenix Film Critics Society	December 15, 2025	Best Visual Effects	Avatar: Fire and Ash	Won	
San Diego Film Critics Society	December 15, 2025	Best Sound Design	Avatar: Fire and Ash	Nominated	
San Diego Film Critics Society	December 15, 2025	Best Visual Effects	Avatar: Fire and Ash	Won	
Santa Barbara International Film Festival	February 7, 2026	Variety Artisans Award	Visual Effects (Eric Saindon)	Honored	
Satellite Awards	March 10, 2026	Best Motion Picture – Drama	Avatar: Fire and Ash	Nominated	
Satellite Awards	March 10, 2026	Best Director	James Cameron	Nominated	
Satellite Awards	March 10, 2026	Best Original Song	"Dream as One" (Miley Cyrus, Mark Ronson, Andrew Wyatt, and Simon Franglen)	Won	
Satellite Awards	March 10, 2026	Best Production Design	Dylan Cole and Ben Procter	Nominated	
Satellite Awards	March 10, 2026	Best Sound	Brent Burge, Alexis Feodoroff, Michael Hedges, Julian Howarth, Gary Summers, and Gwendolyn Yates Whittle	Nominated	
Satellite Awards	March 10, 2026	Best Visual Effects	Joe Letteri, Richard Baneham, Eric Saindon, and Daniel Barrett	Won	
Saturn Awards	March 8, 2026	Best Science Fiction Film	Avatar: Fire and Ash	Won	
Saturn Awards	March 8, 2026	Best Film Direction	James Cameron	Won	
Saturn Awards	March 8, 2026	Best Actor in a Film	Sam Worthington	Nominated	
Saturn Awards	March 8, 2026	Best Actress in a Film	Zoe Saldaña	Nominated	
Saturn Awards	March 8, 2026	Best Supporting Actor in a Film	Stephen Lang	Nominated	
Saturn Awards	March 8, 2026	Best Supporting Actress in a Film	Oona Chaplin	Nominated	
Saturn Awards	March 8, 2026	Best Younger Performer in a Film	Jack Champion	Won	
Saturn Awards	March 8, 2026	Best Film Screenwriting	James Cameron, Rick Jaffa, and Amanda Silver	Won	
Saturn Awards	March 8, 2026	Best Film Editing	James Cameron, John Refoua, Steve Rivkin, Nicolas de Toth, and Jason Gaudio	Nominated	
Saturn Awards	March 8, 2026	Best Film Music	Simon Franglen	Nominated	
Saturn Awards	March 8, 2026	Best Film Production Design	Dylan Cole and Ben Procter	Nominated	
Saturn Awards	March 8, 2026	Best Film Visual / Special Effects	Joe Letteri, Richard Baneham, Eric Saindon, and Daniel Barrett	Won	
Seattle Film Critics Society	December 15, 2025	Best Action Choreography	Steve Brown, Stuart Thorp, and Garrett Warren	Nominated	
Seattle Film Critics Society	December 15, 2025	Best Visual Effects	Joe Letteri, Richard Baneham, Eric Saindon, and Daniel Barrett	Won	
Set Decorators Society of America Awards	February 21, 2026	Best Achievement in Décor/Design of a Fantasy or Science Fiction Feature Film	Vanessa Cole (Set Decoration); Dylan Cole and Ben Procter (Production Design)	Nominated	
St. Louis Film Critics Association	December 14, 2025	Best Visual Effects	Joe Letteri, Richard Baneham, Eric Saindon, and Daniel Barrett	Won	
Visual Effects Society	February 25, 2026	Outstanding Visual Effects in a Photoreal Feature	Richard Baneham, Peter Litvack, Eric Saindon, Nicky Muir, and Steve Ingram	Won	
Visual Effects Society	February 25, 2026	Outstanding Character in a Photoreal Feature	Stephen Clee, Stuart Adcock, Keven Norris, and Joseph Kim (for "Varang: Leader of the Ash Clan")	Won	
Visual Effects Society	February 25, 2026	Outstanding Environment in a Photoreal Feature	Gianluca Pizzaia, Steve Bevins, Dziga Kaiser, and Zsolt Máté (for "Bridgehead Industrial City")	Won	
Visual Effects Society	February 25, 2026	Outstanding CG Cinematography	Steve Deane, AJ Briones, Zachary Brake, and Andrew Moffett	Won	
Visual Effects Society	February 25, 2026	Outstanding Model in a Photoreal or Animated Project	Michael Smale, Sam Sharplin, Joe W. Churchill, and Jacqi Dillon (for "The Windtraders' Gondola")	Won	
Visual Effects Society	February 25, 2026	Outstanding Effects Simulations in a Photoreal Feature	Nicholas Illingworth, Sarah C. Farmer, James Robinson, and Ryan Bowden (for "Simulating Pandora")	Won	
Visual Effects Society	February 25, 2026	Outstanding Compositing & Lighting in a Feature	Ziad Shureih, Stefano Oggeri, Jaume Creus Costabella, and Hugo Debat-Burkarth (for "Bridgehead Industrial City")	Nominated	
Visual Effects Society	February 25, 2026	Outstanding Compositing & Lighting in a Feature	Alex Klaricich, Gianfranco Sgura, Brad Floyd, and Ari Ross (for "The Wind Traders, Bridgehead, Rivers, and Ocean")	Nominated	
Visual Effects Society	February 25, 2026	Emerging Technology Award	Christoph Sprenger, Tobias Mack, Florian Fernandez, and Niall Ryan (for "BodyOpt")	Nominated	
Visual Effects Society	February 25, 2026	Emerging Technology Award	Alexey Dmitrievich Stomakhin, John Edholm, Murali Ramachari, and Aleksandr Isakov (for "Kora Fire Toolset")	Won	
Washington D.C. Area Film Critics Association	December 7, 2025	Best Motion Capture Performance	Oona Chaplin	Nominated	
Washington D.C. Area Film Critics Association	December 7, 2025	Best Motion Capture Performance	Stephen Lang	Nominated	
Washington D.C. Area Film Critics Association	December 7, 2025	Best Motion Capture Performance	Zoe Saldaña	Won	
Washington D.C. Area Film Critics Association	December 7, 2025	Best Motion Capture Performance	Sigourney Weaver	Nominated	
Washington D.C. Area Film Critics Association	December 7, 2025	Best Motion Capture Performance	Sam Worthington	Nominated	
World Soundtrack Awards	October 10, 2026	Public Choice Award	Avatar: Fire and Ash – Simon Franglen	Nominated	

== Future ==
Fire and Ash is the second of four planned sequels to Avatar. Cameron stated in a 2017 interview that if The Way of Water and Fire and Ash did not meet box office expectations, Avatar 4 and Avatar 5 would not be produced. He said the two final sequels will share an overarching narrative, similar to the story shared by The Way of Water and Fire and Ash.

In January 2019, in the midst of the proposed acquisition of 21st Century Fox by The Walt Disney Company, Disney CEO Bob Iger confirmed that both Avatar 4 and 5 were being developed but had not been officially greenlit. According to producer Jon Landau in February 2019, Iger may have been misinterpreted. He said that Avatar 4 and 5 "are not only [greenlit]" but also a third of Avatar 4 has already been filmed.

In September 2022, at the D23 Expo, Cameron announced that production for Avatar 4 had officially begun. In January 2024, Cameron said that he would not start filming the remainder of Avatar 4 until Fire and Ash was released.

In January 2026, Cameron stopped short of confirming whether Avatar 4 and 5 would officially happen, but did reaffirm Fire and Ash would need to succeed at the box office and added that he would need to figure out a way to make both sequels on a smaller budget, in order to get the approval from the studio. He also confirmed that actress Michelle Yeoh would appear in 4, if made, and that she would be a Na'vi character named Paktu'eylat. Yeoh stated that she filmed for several weeks in 2022.

According to Disney, as of March 20, 2026, Avatar 4 is scheduled for release on December 21, 2029, while Avatar 5 is scheduled for December 19, 2031. Ahead of Fire and Ash's digital release on March 31, 2026, producer Rae Sanchini confirmed that both 4 and 5 were progressing into active pre-production, barring a small hiatus to update the visual effects process with new technology.

In April 2026, TheWrap reported that there were ongoing conversations on "how to make future Avatar movies cheaper and shorter" than their predecessors so that they are a "less risky" investment for Disney, though the company had yet to make a decision. "It's all about compare-and-contrast—Fire and Ash made half of what the first movie made. And ticket prices in 2009 were not what they are in 2025. That's the level that James Cameron and the Avatar films are operating in", said Paul Dergarabedian, head of marketplace trends at Comscore.

In May 2026, Cameron said his crew was exploring new technologies that might allow them to make the sequels more efficiently. He said he was hoping to make the films in half the time compared to their predecessors and for two-thirds of the cost, and that it would take roughly a year to figure out how to accomplish that.

== See also ==
- James Cameron filmography
- List of underwater science fiction works
- List of films with the longest production time
