= Britain Dalton =

American actor

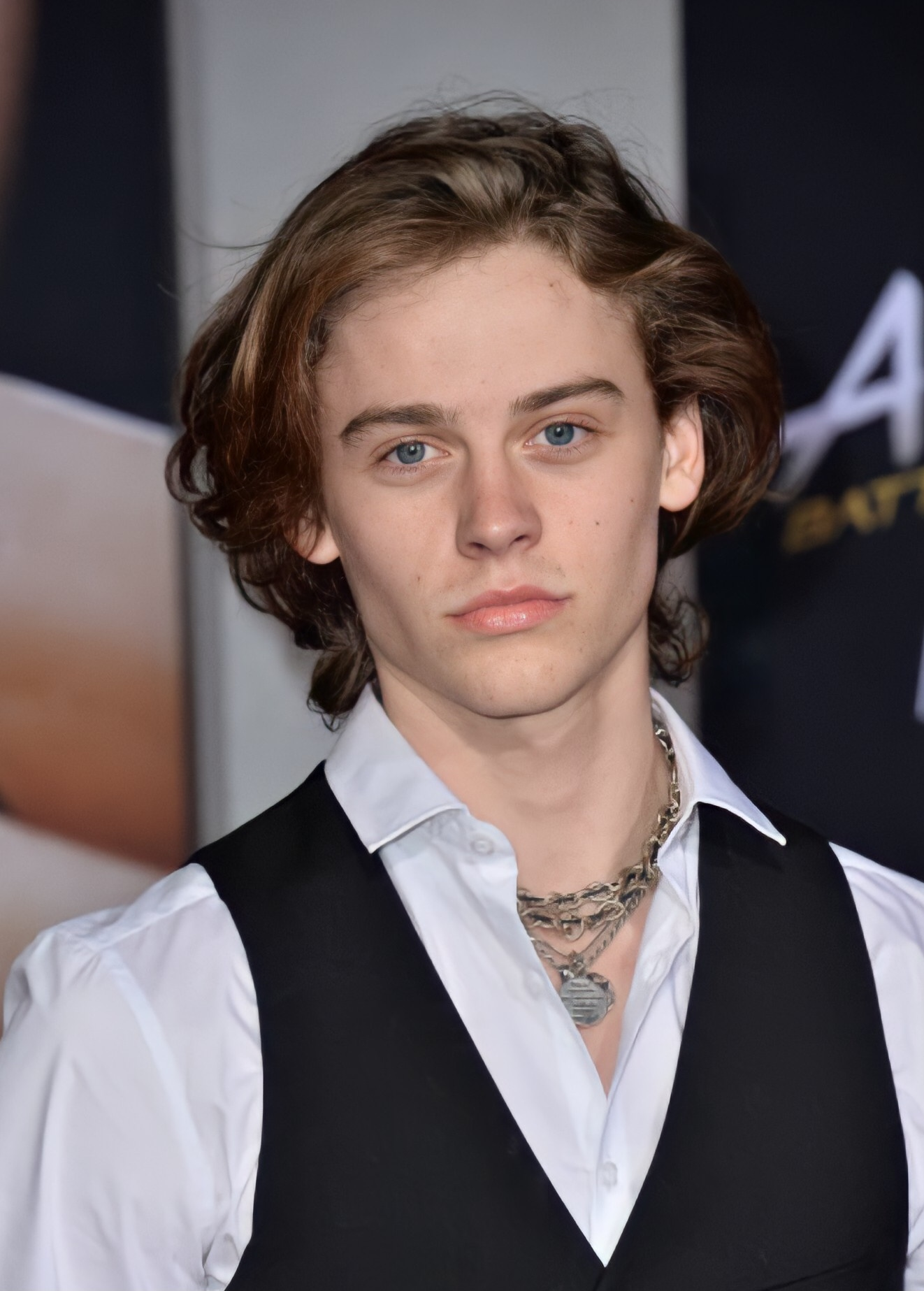
- Dalton in 2019
- Born: December 12, 2001 (age 24); Los Angeles, California, U.S.
- Occupation: Actor
- Years active: 2015–present

Britain Dalton (born December 12, 2001) is an American actor known for his role as Lo’ak, the second son of Jake Sully and Neytiri, in the science fiction film Avatar: The Way of Water (2022) and its 2025 sequel.

== Early life ==
Dalton was born on December 12, 2001, in Los Angeles, California. His father is songwriter Jeremy Dalton.

== Career ==
He started acting after a film student spotted him doing card tricks for a crowd on the street. The student asked him to audition for the lead role in a Chapman University film titled Jude's Tribute. Dalton filmed Avatar: The Way of Water and Avatar: Fire and Ash with director James Cameron.

== Filmography ==
Key
†	Denotes films that have not yet been released

=== Film ===
Year	Title	Role	Notes
2016	Grill Dog	Collin	Short film
2017	Thumper	Dean	
2018	Ready Player One	High School Kid	
2018	Urchin	Nix	Short film
2022	Avatar: The Way of Water	Lo'ak	
2023	Dark Harvest	Jim Shephard	
2025	Avatar: Fire and Ash	Lo'ak	

=== Television ===
Year	Title	Role	Notes
2015	Criminal Minds	Billy Hawkins	1 episode
2016	Goliath	Jason Larson	8 episodes

=== Video games ===
Year	Title	Voice role	Notes
2016	Uncharted 4: A Thief's End	Young Nathan Drake	Also motion capture

=== Music video ===
Year	Title	Artist	Role	Ref
2014	"When We Come Alive"	Switchfoot	A kid	
