= Sully =

Sully may refer to:

- Chesley "Sully" Sullenberger (born 1951), American pilot notable for landing his disabled airliner on the Hudson in 2009
  - Sully (film), a 2016 film by Clint Eastwood about Sullenberger

== Places ==
=== France ===
- Sully, Calvados, commune in the department of Calvados
- Sully, Oise, commune in the department of Oise
- Sully, Saône-et-Loire, commune in the department of Saône-et-Loire
  - Château de Sully, Saône-et-Loire department
- Sully-sur-Loire, commune in the department of Loiret

=== United Kingdom ===
- Sully, Vale of Glamorgan, a village in Wales
- Sully Island, an island of Wales

=== United States ===
- Sully, Iowa, a town
- Sully, West Virginia, an unincorporated community
- Sully County, South Dakota
- Sully Historic Site, Fairfax County, Virginia
- Fort Sully (Fort Leavenworth), an American Civil War artillery battery built west of Fort Leavenworth in 1864
- Fort Sully (South Dakota) (1863–1894), a military post originally built for the Indian Wars
- Sully Creek (South Dakota)

== People with the surname or nickname ==
- Sully (surname)

=== As a placename within a person's name or title ===
- Eudes de Sully (died 1208), Bishop of Paris
- Henry de Sully (died 1195), monk, Bishop of Worcester and Abbot of Glastonbury
- Henry de Sully (died 1189), Abbot of Fécamp, Bishop-designate of Salisbury and Archbishop-elect of York
- Henry de Sully (died 1336)
- Hugh of Sully (French: Hugues de Sully), 13th century general under the Sicilian King Charles of Anjou
- Maurice de Sully (died 1196), Bishop of Paris who oversaw the building of Notre Dame
- Maximilien de Béthune, Duke of Sully (1560–1641), French soldier, statesman and minister who served King Henry IV of France
- William, Count of Sully (c. 1085–c. 1150), Count of Blois, Count of Chartres and jure uxoris Count of Sully, also known as William the Simple

=== Nickname ===
- Salvatore Sully Erna (born 1968), lead vocalist of Godsmack
- Carlos Aneese Sully Kothmann (1933–1986), American pair skater
- Sully Montgomery (1901–1970), American National Football League player, boxer and sheriff
- Kevin O'Sullivan (baseball) (born 1968), head coach of the Florida Gators baseball team
- Sully Prudhomme (1839–1907), French poet, essayist and Nobel laureate
- Andrew Sullivan (born 1963), English-American journalist and political-blogging pioneer
- Anthony Sullivan (pitchman) (born 1969), English-American advertising figure
- Clive Sullivan (1943–1985), rugby player
- Mike Sullivan (ice hockey) (born 1968), American professional ice hockey coach

== Fictional characters ==
- Byron Sully, in Dr. Quinn, Medicine Woman
- Jake Sully, protagonist of the Avatar franchise
- Sully the Aardvark, from Jungle Jam and Friends: The Radio Show!
- Sully and Biff, on Sesame Street
- Sulley, a character in Monsters Inc.
- Sully, a character in Fire Emblem Awakening
- Sully, a character in Kerosene by Chris Wooding
- Sully, a character in Danger Rangers
- Sully, a character in Commando
- Sully, a character in The Perfect Storm
- Sully, a character in The Warriors and its video game adaptation
- John 'Sully' Sullivan, a character in Third Watch
- Victor Sullivan, a character in the Uncharted game series

== Other uses ==
- Sully (band)
- Sully (dog), service dog used by George H.W. Bush
- Sully, a play about the life of Clive Sullivan, produced by Hull Truck Theatre
- French cruiser Sully, an armoured cruiser launched in 1901, run aground and wrecked in 1905
- Pavillon de l'Horloge, also known as the Pavillon Sully, in the Palais du Louvre in Paris
- Sully (music producer), English jungle DJ and producer from Norwich.

== See also ==
- Sully-la-Chapelle, Loiret département, France
- Sully-sur-Loire, Loiret département, France
- Sulley (disambiguation)
- Sulli (disambiguation)
