= Avatar: Frontiers of Pandora =

2023 video game

- Developer: Massive Entertainment (Note: Additional work and design provided by Ubisoft Stockholm, Ubisoft Shanghai, Ubisoft Chengdu, Ubisoft Toronto, Ubisoft Milan, Ubisoft Montpellier, Ubisoft Kyiv, Ubisoft Reflections, Ubisoft Leamington, Ubisoft Bucharest, Ubisoft Düsseldorf, 20th Century Games, and Lightstorm Entertainment)
- Publisher: Ubisoft
- Directors: Magnus Jansén; Ditte Deenfeldt
- Composer: Pinar Toprak
- Series: Avatar
- Engine: Snowdrop
- Platforms: PlayStation 5; Windows; Xbox Series X/S
- Release: December 7, 2023
- Genre: Action-adventure
- Modes: Single-player, multiplayer

Avatar: Frontiers of Pandora is a 2023 action-adventure game developed by Massive Entertainment and published by Ubisoft. The game is part of the Avatar franchise, and was released for PlayStation 5, Windows, and Xbox Series X/S on December 7, 2023. It received mixed reviews from critics. Ubisoft supported the game with several downloadable content (DLC) packs including The Sky Breaker in July 2024, Secrets of the Spires in November 2024, and Avatar: From the Ashes in December 19, 2025.

== Gameplay ==
In the game, which can be played from first-person, the player assumes control of a Na'vi who must fight against hostile RDA soldiers and mechs.

In the game, the player assumes control of a Na'vi orphan from a first-person perspective. A third-person mode was released in December 2025. It takes place in Pandora, a large open world divided into three distinct regions, each with unique biomes, quests, and inhabitants. The character had been raised and trained as a soldier by the Resources Development Administration (RDA), was put into suspended animation, and awakened 16 years later in an abandoned facility. The player journeys across the Western Frontier, a previously unseen region of Pandora, discovering the character's origins, and organizing the local Na'vi clans to fight back against the RDA, as they attempt to exploit the region's natural resources. The story is partially tied to the films. The game also supports two-player cooperative multiplayer.

The player can use "Na'vi senses" to highlight interactable objects, and vulnerable points of enemies. The player is equipped with both RDA weapons like assault rifles and shotguns, and Na'vi weapons such as bows and arrows and spear throwers to combat enemies. Progression and quest completion unlocks better gear, improving combat performance. Ammo, throwables, and other consumables can be crafted using materials collected in the wilds. Animals can be hunted, though using firearms on them will prevent the collection of crafting resources. Players can gain "clan favor" by defeating RDA troops, helping fellow Na'vi, and progressing; this can be used to purchase rare weapons, armor, and crafting materials. The player character is very agile, with advanced acrobatic feats such as double jumping. The character can ride on a flying "ikran" creature to quickly navigate the world.

== Plot ==
In the year 2146, eight years before Jake Sully arrives on Pandora, (Note: As seen in James Cameron's Avatar (2009)) the RDA sets up The Ambassador Program (TAP), led by Dr. Alma Cortez and RDA Director John Mercer, with the goal of training five young Na'vi children to be Na'vi-human ambassadors; Tamtey (Note: Initially referred to as "The Sarentu" in the main story, before their name was revealed in Avatar: From the Ashes), Ri'nela, Aha'ri, Teylan, and Nor. The Na'vi children remember that they were abducted from their clan and are annoyed by Mercer's strict curriculum, culminating in them attempting to escape. Mercer shoots and kills Aha'ri to terrorize them into giving up. Eight years later (2154), the RDA's loss against Jake's army forces the remaining RDA forces to evacuate Pandora. Mercer orders the now adult Na'vi students to be executed as liabilities, but Alma defies him and leads the students to a cryogenic life-suspension chamber so they can hide.

The students are awakened sixteen years later (2162) by Na'vi resistance fighters working with Alma. They narrowly escape the facility when an RDA force led by Mercer returns to eliminate the students. Tamtey is able to escape and reunite their friends before joining Alma and her team of ex-RDA personnel. After succeeding in their first mission to destroy an RDA energy mining operation, Tamtey manages to make a connection with Eywa, the living spirit of Pandora, and communes with their ancestors to learn about the nearly extinct Sarentu clan. The RDA steps up their aggression by launching a raid on Alma's hideout. Tamtey is able to hold them off long enough to catch the attention of the Aranahe clan, who welcome them; their leader Ka'nat remains reluctant to start a war against the technologically superior RDA.

Eventually, the RDA's continued encroachment into Na'vi lands begins to provoke the Zeswa clan and Tamtey takes it upon themselves to destroy RDA facilities and forge an alliance between the clans, culminating in them forcing the RDA to abandon a critical facility. Despite the major victory, Nor begins to voice his resentment against Alma for failing to protect them from Mercer, which causes a rift between him and Teylan, before the RDA ambushes their base and captures Tamtey. Alma's lieutenant Billy Nash rescues Tamtey at the cost of his own life. Tamtey links back up with the Resistance only to find that Alma and many others are afflicted with an illness caused by an RDA chemical weapon and that Teylan has apparently deserted. Tamtey approaches the local Kame'tire clan to provide healing and in the process discovers the existence of another TAP facility called TAP Con-1.

Investigating TAP Con-1, Tamtey learns that a traitor within the Kame'tire tipped off Mercer about the location of the Sarentu clan, resulting in the clan being massacred and Mercer taking the surviving children to raise as soldiers loyal to him. With the traitor exposed, the Kame'tire leader Anufi agrees to atone for the betrayal by healing the sick Resistance members. Nor abandons the Resistance, although not before fatally stabbing Alma in her Avatar body. Before her Na'vi form dies and she returns to her original human body, Alma conveys her memories to Tamtey and Ri'nela, revealing that she had helped Mercer carry out the massacre out of a desire to ensure the TAP program's success and that she has regretted her decision ever since.

The RDA increases its efforts to extract oil from Pandora, prompting Tamtey and the Resistance to investigate what the RDA is truly up to. They learn that Mercer intends to detonate explosives beneath the surface of Pandora, opening the entire land up for extraction and depriving the Na'vi clans of the native fauna that sustains them. With no other choice, the many Na'vi clans unite together and assault Mercer's base while Tamtey infiltrate from the caves below. Teylan, who had initially sided with Mercer, switches sides back to the Resistance. Working together, Tamtey and Teylan sabotage the bomb and trap Mercer, leaving him to die in the explosion. In the aftermath, the RDA retreats from the region and Tamtey, Ri'nela, and Teylan decide to focus on rebuilding the Sarentu clan.

=== Downloadable Content ===
The Sky Breaker

Secrets of the Spires

From the Ashes

== Development ==
In March 2017, Massive announced that its next major game would be based on James Cameron's Avatar. The game was titled Avatar: Frontiers of Pandora with a trailer at E3 2021. Its story stands alone within the Avatar universe, with "some elements that will pay off when Avatar: Fire and Ash comes out".

== Release ==
In a 2021 investor call, it was revealed that Avatar: Frontiers of Pandora was tentatively set to release in the fiscal year of April 2022 to March 2023. In July 2022, it was delayed to the fiscal year of April 2023 to March 2024. The Ubisoft Forward June 2023 video revealed a release date of December 7, 2023.

Massive released two downloadable content packs for the game. The first pack, titled The Sky Breaker, was released on July 16, 2024. Players will explore a new area named "The Heart of the Plains", and investigate a mysterious threat looming in the sky. The second pack, titled Secrets of the Spires, was released on November 28, 2024. It is set in a new, mountainous region named "Spires of the Clouded Forest". A story expansion for the game, titled From the Ashes, was released on December 19, 2025 to coincide with the release of Avatar: Fire and Ash.

== Reception ==
=== Critical response ===
Reception

Aggregate scores
| Aggregator | Score |
|---|---|
| Metacritic | (PC) 72/100 (Note: Based on 86 critic reviews; 53% (46 reviews) of which is classified as "positive", 42% (36 reviews) as "mixed", 2% (2 reviews) as "negative", and the remaining are unscored) (PS5) 72/100 (Note: Based on 30 critic reviews; 53% (16 reviews) of which is classified as "positive" and 43% (13 reviews) as "mixed", and 3% (1 review) as "negative") (XSXS) 75/100 (Note: Based on 15 critic reviews; 53% (8 reviews) of which is classified as "positive", 40% (6 reviews) as "mixed", and the remaining one is unscored) |
| OpenCritic | 52% (Note: Based on 147 critic reviews) |

Review scores
| Publication | Score |
|---|---|
| Destructoid | 9/10 |
| Famitsu | 32/40 |
| Game Informer | 7.75/10 |
| GameSpot | 8/10 |
| GamesRadar+ | 3.5/5 |
| HobbyConsolas | 87/100 |
| IGN | 7/10 |
| Jeuxvideo.com | 15/20 |
| PCGamesN | 6/10 |
| Shacknews | 5/10 |
| The Guardian | 3/5 |
| Video Games Chronicle | 4/5 |
| VideoGamer.com | 8/10 |

Avatar: Frontiers of Pandora received "mixed or average" reviews from critics for the PlayStation 5 and PC versions, while the Xbox Series X/S version received "generally favorable" reviews, according to review aggregator website Metacritic. The game was recommended by 53% of critics on OpenCritic. In Japan, four critics from Famitsu gave the game a total score of 32 out of 40, with each critic awarding the game an 8 out of 10.

GameSpot praised the game's open world, movement mechanics, combat, crafting and story, but criticized its "over-reliance" on Na'vi vision, closed-area combat and investigation system, stating that there were "countless Far Cry comparisons" to be made. Kotaku Australia noted the mostly positive reviews and called it "The Okayest Game of 2023".

=== Sales ===
In Japan, the PlayStation 5 version of Avatar: Frontiers of Pandora sold 8,363 physical copies during its first week, ranking as the 12th best-selling retail game in the country for that period. In the United Kingdom, the game debuted at 5th place on the physical sales charts for the week ending December 9, 2023, and remained in the top 15 through the week ending December 30. During the same month, it was the 6th best-selling game across Europe. The game also ranked among the top 10 most-downloaded PlayStation 5 games in the United States, Canada, and Europe in December.

By January 2024, Avatar: Frontiers of Pandora had accumulated approximately 1.9 million players and generated an estimated $133 million in revenue. That month, it ranked among the top 20 best-selling games in the United States. The game was also the 17th most-downloaded PlayStation 5 title in the United States and Canada, and the 9th most-downloaded in Europe in January. Microsoft later reported that Avatar: Frontiers of Pandora ranked among the top 20 best-selling Xbox games of 2024.

By early 2026, less than a month after the release of the From the Ashes DLC, Avatar: Frontiers of Pandora was averaging approximately 2,000 concurrent players on Steam. Prior to December 2025, the game’s all-time peak was 2,614 concurrent players. On December 22, 2025, it reached a new peak of 12,496 concurrent players. Over the Christmas holidays and into January 2026, the game repeatedly surpassed this record, reaching 15,283 concurrent players.

=== Awards ===
At the Hollywood Music in Media Awards in 2024, Avatar: Frontiers of Pandora won Best Original Song - Video Game (Console & PC) for "The People’s Cry (Main Theme)". The game was nominated for a Grammy Award for Best Score Soundtrack for Video Games and Other Interactive Media at the 67th Annual Grammy Awards; the Secret of the Spire expansion also got a nomination in the same category at the 68th Annual Grammy Awards, as well as the From the Ashes expansion at the 69th Annual Grammy Awards.
