= Avatar Flight of Passage =

Attraction at Disney's Animal Kingdom

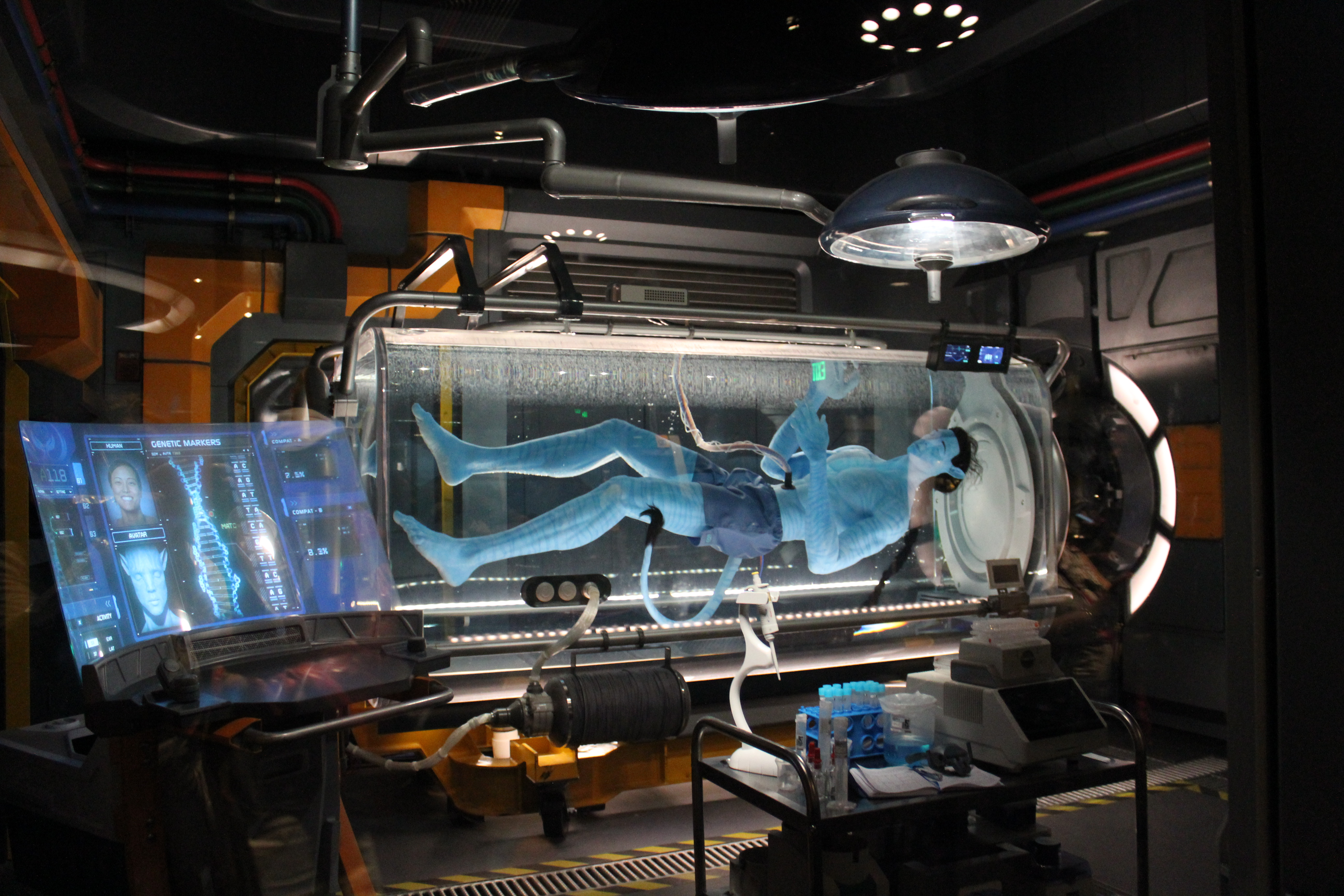
- Avatar in the standby queue

Disney's Animal Kingdom
- Area: Pandora – The World of Avatar
- Coordinates: 28.3554°N 81.5921°W
- Status: Operating
- Soft opening date: May 26, 2017
- Opening date: May 27, 2017

Ride statistics
- Attraction type: 3D flying simulator
- Designer: Walt Disney Imagineering; Lightstorm Entertainment; Weta Digital
- Theme: Avatar
- Music: James Horner; Simon Franglen
- Vehicles: Link chair
- Rows: 3 (between three levels)
- Riders per row: 16
- Duration: 4:24
- Height restriction: 44 in (112 cm)
- Audio-animatronics: Yes
- Pre-show hosts: Dr. Stevens; Dr. Jackie Ogden
- Lightning Lane Single Pass available
- Must transfer from wheelchair
- Assistive listening available
- Closed captioning available

Avatar Flight of Passage is a 3D flying simulator attraction within Pandora – The World of Avatar at Disney's Animal Kingdom. Set in the Avatar universe, the attraction allows guests to take flight on a native mountain Banshee and soar across the landscape of Pandora.

== Cast ==
- Alison Blanchard as Dr. Ogden
- David Danipour as Dr. Stevens

== Development ==
Work on Avatar Flight of Passage began in 2012 and involved staff from Walt Disney Imagineering, James Cameron's Lightstorm Entertainment, and Weta Digital. All of the footage in the ride is original, with Executive Producer Amy Jupiter revealing, "Everything you see in the attraction’s main show was original to this production. We were fortunate to be able to use the model and texture assets from the first film during our templating/visualization process. We were also able to use animation cycles for our [background] characters." Weta Digital provided the main ride film footage.

== Ride experience ==
In the attraction's storyline, the humans and Na'vi are attempting to restore the banshee population to natural levels, after the mining tactics caused by the Resources Development Administration (RDA) generations prior. Alpha Centauri Expeditions (ACE) has reactivated the avatar program through the Pandora Conservation Initiative as a method of conducting research, and allows guests to link with an avatar to fly on an Ikran (known to humans as a "Banshee") to partake in the Na'vi's tribal coming-of-age tradition.

Set within the remains of a former RDA facility, the attraction invites guests into the ACE lab where guests are linked to an "avatar" and fly aboard a banshee across the Valley of Mo'ara.

The ride's visual effects are in 10K resolution at 60 fps stereo.

== Warning cards ==
On February 27, 2018, after four incidents had occurred, Disney added warning cards for riders before entering the ride. The cards were similar to those on Mission: Space and warned riders about fear of heights, motion sickness, and the seating restraints. These cards were removed in late 2018 and have been replaced with a pre-recorded message which communicates similar information to guests. The message plays only in the queue room immediately before the ride experience. Cast Members give a safety spiel with warnings before entering ride room.

== Reception ==
Avatar Flight of Passage was ranked in the Amusement Today's Golden Ticket Awards for best new ride of 2017 with 15% of the vote, to come in second place. The ride won the 2018 Visual Effects Society Award for Outstanding Visual Effects in a Special Venue Project.

Golden Ticket Awards: Best New Ride for 2017
Ranking	2
