= Pandora – The World of Avatar =

Themed area of Avatar, located in Disney Animal Kingdom

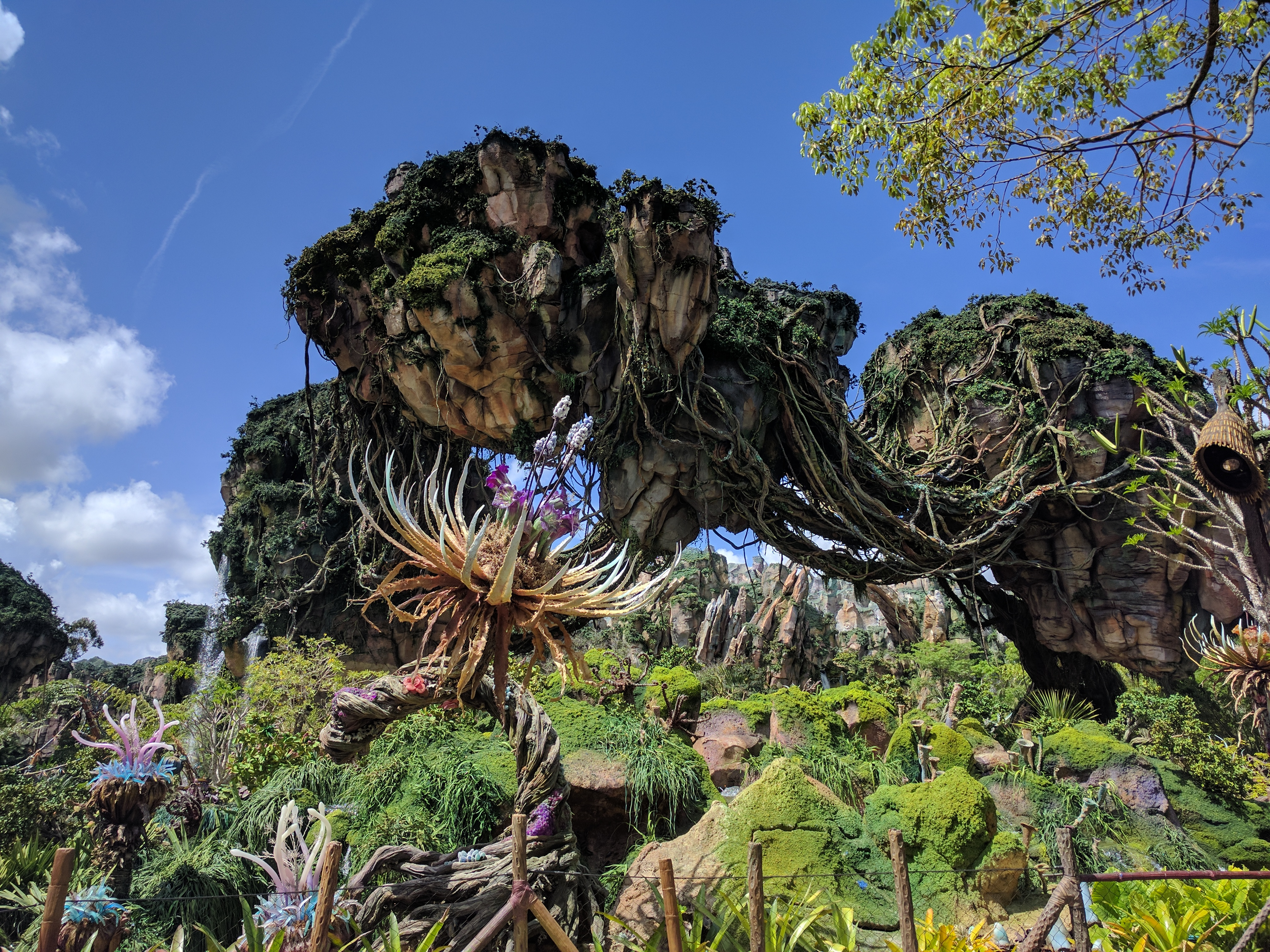
- The landscape of the Valley of Mo'ara
- Interactive map of Pandora – The World of Avatar
- Theme: Avatar
- Area: 12 acres (4.9 ha)

Attractions
- Total: 2

Disney's Animal Kingdom
- Coordinates: 28.3554244°N 81.591694°W
- Status: Operating
- Opened: May 27, 2017
- Replaced: Camp Minnie-Mickey

Pandora – The World of Avatar is a themed area inspired by James Cameron's Avatar located within Disney's Animal Kingdom theme park at the Walt Disney World Resort in Bay Lake, Florida, near Orlando. Set generations into the future after the events of the Avatar films, the area is based upon the fictional habitable exomoon, Pandora, and features Pandora's floating mountains, alien wildlife, and bioluminescent plants. Spanning 12 acres (4.9 ha), Pandora – The World of Avatar includes two major attractions, Avatar Flight of Passage and Na'vi River Journey, as well as retail and dining outlets.

Walt Disney Imagineering began development on Pandora – The World of Avatar in 2011, jointly with Cameron and his production company, Lightstorm Entertainment, with the intention of transforming Animal Kingdom into a full-day operation, complete with added attraction capacity and nighttime experiences. Construction on the area began on January 10, 2014, and the land opened to the public on May 27, 2017.

== History ==
=== Development ===
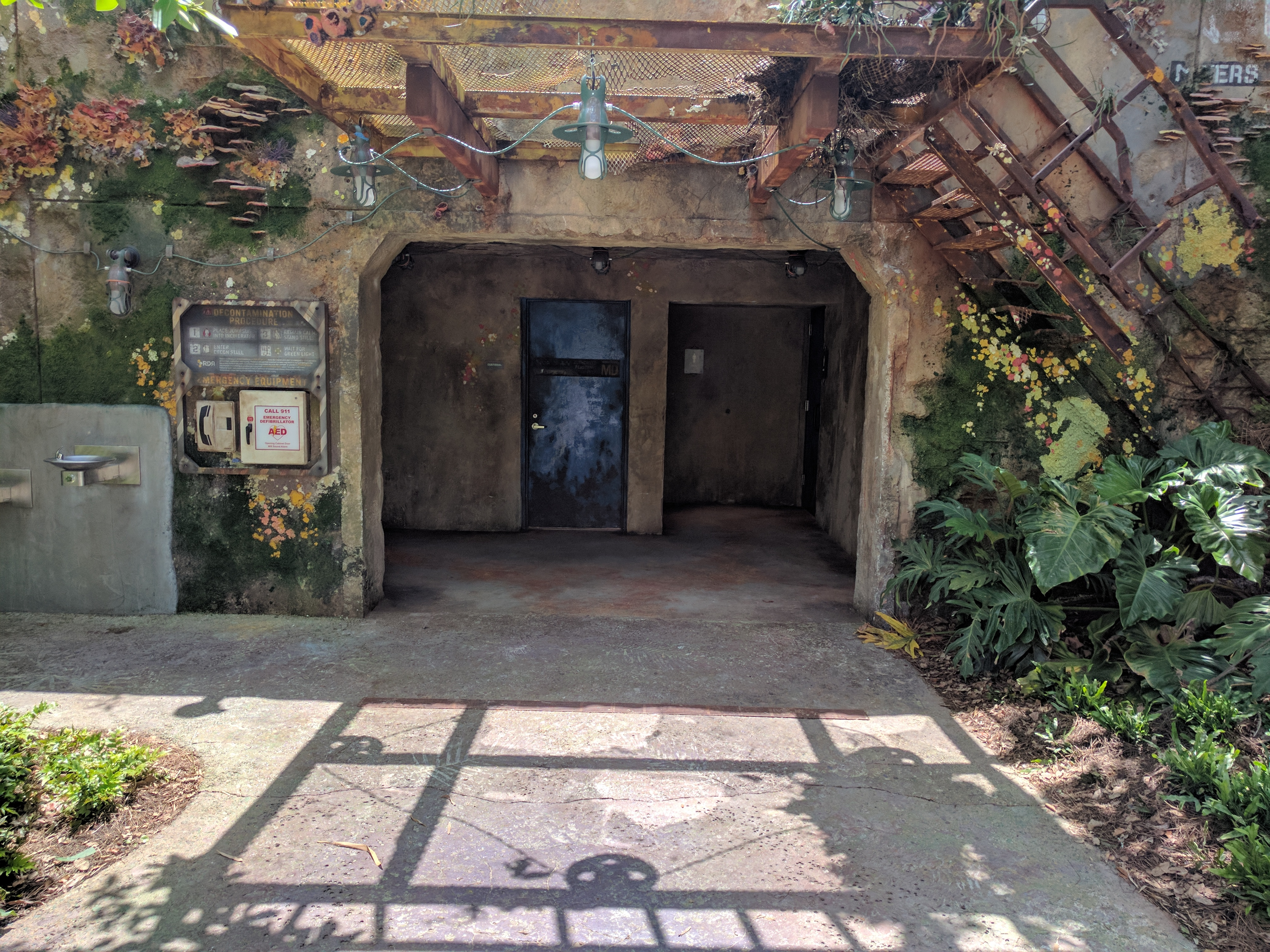
An "abandoned" RDA decontamination area that serves as a guest restroom provides an example of human interference reclaimed by the Pandoran environment.

In early 2011, Avatar creator and director James Cameron was approached by the Walt Disney Company executives Bob Iger and Tom Staggs, CEO and then-COO respectively, regarding the possibility of Avatar-themed attractions at Disney theme parks. Originally, discussions were held about creating an Avatar attraction at Disney's Hollywood Studios, perhaps at the park's then-functioning Studio Backlot Tour. Staggs suggested incorporating the film into a newly designed "land" at Disney's Animal Kingdom to improve the park's attraction roster. Cameron was initially surprised at Disney's larger approach in scope, commenting that "Disney's vision when they came to me was to create a land. I thought we were going to be talking about creating an attraction."

On September 17, 2011, Disney entered into an exclusive, long-term licensing agreement with 20th Century Fox and Cameron's Lightstorm Entertainment for the worldwide theme park rights to Avatar; Disney agreed to pay 20th Century and Cameron a licensing fee and a percentage of merchandise sales. The deal was officially announced to the public on September 20, 2011. The highlight of the announcement was that Disney's Animal Kingdom would receive a new themed area entirely devoted to Avatar. While no specifics were announced, the new area was described as being several acres in size and costing an estimated $400 million to build, a scale similar to Cars Land at Disney California Adventure in California. The area was later estimated to cost approximately $500 million. Disney showcased a first look presentation of the land in October 2013 at the Japan D23 Expo.

Construction began in January 2014, with an initially planned opening date in 2016. The deal could see Avatar attractions added to other Disney theme parks in the future—Disneyland Paris and Hong Kong Disneyland are also in consideration—however, there are no immediate plans to do so. The opening date was later revised to summer 2017.

In February 2017, the official opening day was confirmed to be May 27, 2017. The land received a dedication ceremony on May 24, 2017 with Iger, Cameron, producer Jon Landau, 20th Century chairman Stacey Snider, and cast members Sam Worthington, Zoe Saldaña, Sigourney Weaver, Stephen Lang, Joel David Moore, CCH Pounder, Wes Studi, and Laz Alonso attending the dedication. To promote the park's opening, ABC aired a series of special episodes of The View live from the park, including a special pre-opening preview featuring James Cameron, as well as a live episode on the park's opening day festivities, which included guests Sherri Shepherd, John Stamos, Ariel Winter, Eric Stonestreet, Audra McDonald, Mandy Moore, Tom Bergeron, and chefs Masaharu Morimoto and Art Smith, with musical performances by Andy Grammer and Train.

=== Design ===
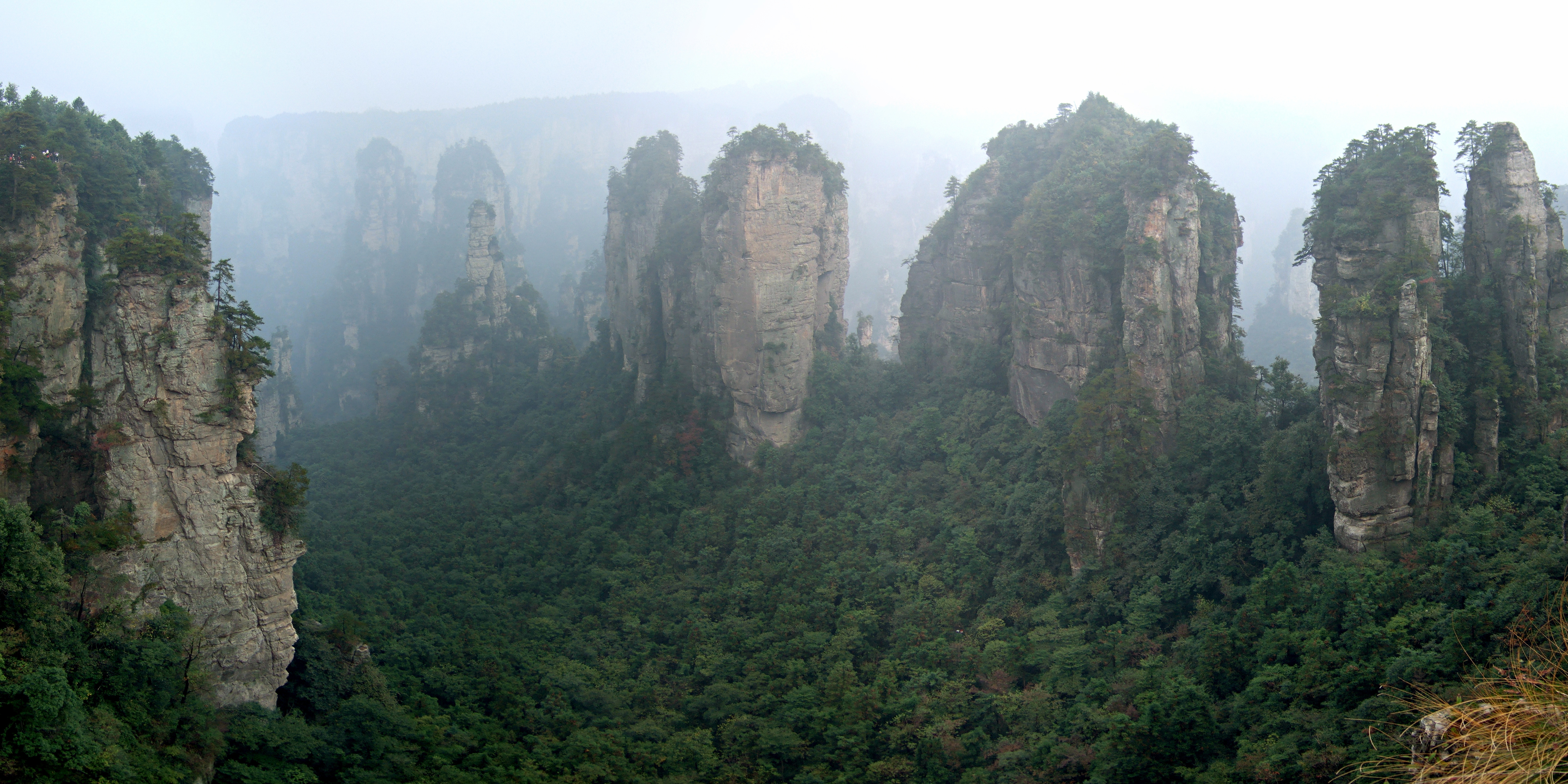
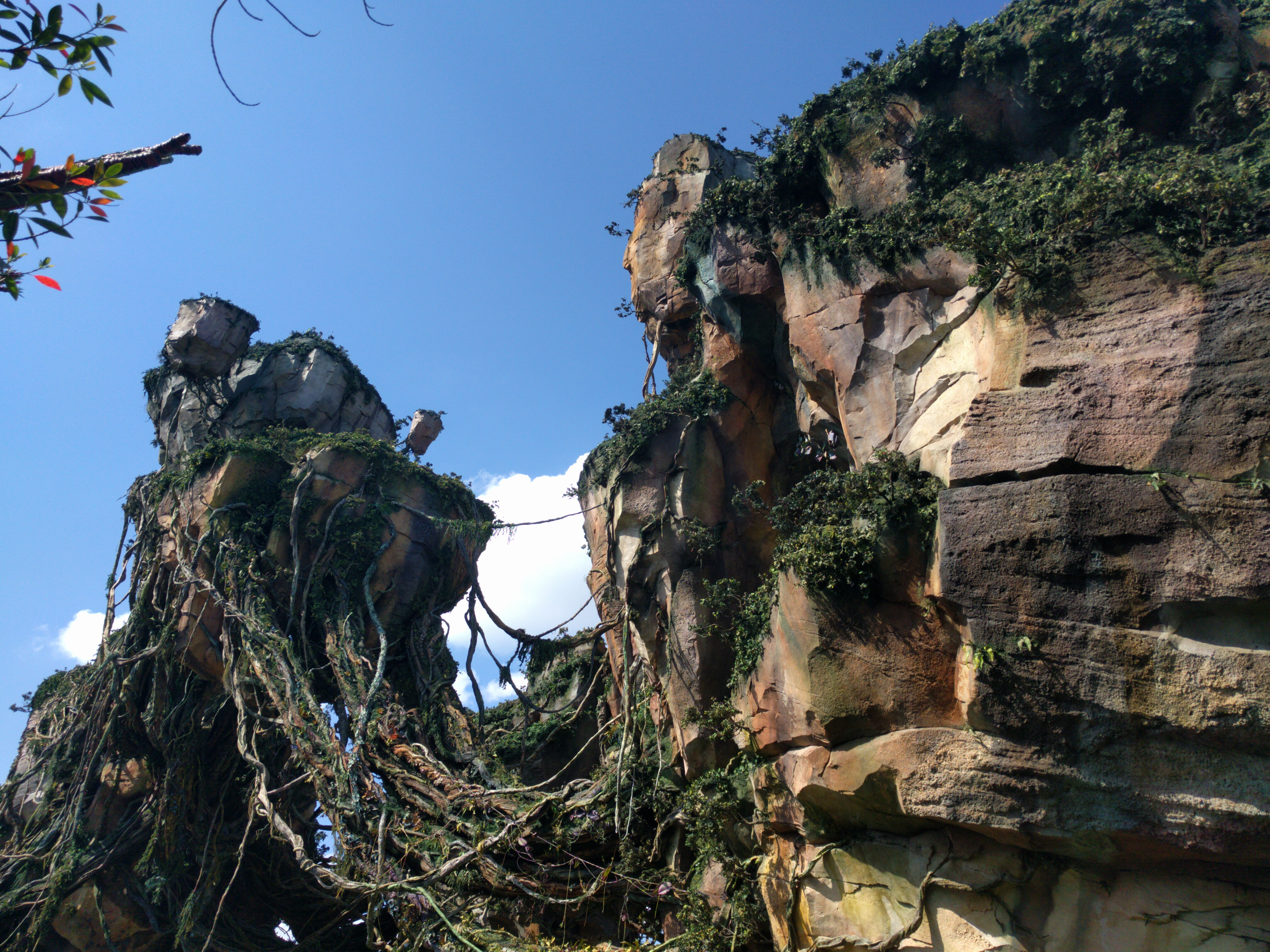
The peaks of Wulingyuan in China (top) served as visual inspiration for the Valley of Mo'ara and its floating mountains (bottom).

Pandora – The World of Avatar is designed by Walt Disney Imagineering and Lightstorm Entertainment with Cameron and Landau acting as creative consultants. Imagineer Joe Rohde, creative executive of Disney's Animal Kingdom, served as creative director for the project. The area was constructed in the former location of Camp Minnie-Mickey, which was originally earmarked for the Beastly Kingdom, a never-built themed land which would have been based around mythological creatures. Instead of including characters or basing the land on existing plotlines from the films, the Disney and Lightstorm team emphasized issues such as conservation and environmental stewardship. Project manager Tim Warzecha described the land as a standalone experience from the films, focusing on "all about the people, the environment, the culture, the animals and the beauty of the world." Rohde cited the film's themes and environmental message as compatible to the park's established values. Rohde said, "If you think about the intrinsic value of nature, transformation through adventure, and personal call to action — these are the values of Animal Kingdom. But if you say them again, those are the themes of the film Avatar. So Avatar and Animal Kingdom will nest into each other very, very neatly."

Animal Kingdom is a place about the kind of realism that derives from those animals. We really want to live up to that state of realism to the detail, to the complete immersion which is part of the signature of that park to the sense that these are events that are really happening to you – that it is your adventure. When we translate that into the world of Avatar it presents a whole new series of technical challenges because of the very nature of that world itself."

— Joe Rohde, describing Avatar's connection to Animal Kingdom.

Disney and Lightstorm decided to set the land's timeline generations after the warring conflict between the indigenous Na'vi and the Resources Development Administration (RDA) that sought to exploit Pandora for its unobtanium in the first film. According to the backstory, the Na'vi and humans have achieved peace and Alpha Centauri Expeditions (ACE)–a fictional tourism company–has partnered with the Na'vi to present Pandora as a new destination for ecotourism and scientific research. As a result, ACE established the Pandora Conservation Initiative to preserve and study the native Pandoran species.

In September 2011, Cameron confirmed that a flying attraction featuring "3-D projections and creature designs that were cut from the original film" was a concept on the drawing board for the area. Pandora – The World of Avatar includes elements from the original Avatar film, The Way of Water, Fire and Ash, as well as two, yet-to-be-released sequels. Rohde stated that it was initially difficult to adapt the locations depicted in Avatar to the physical realm, as Pandora is portrayed in the films solely through computer-generated imagery. Therefore, Imagineering adapted the concept art and digital designs from the films and expanded upon it, with Rohde explaining that "there was not enough detail in those images for an actual place that you're really going to build."

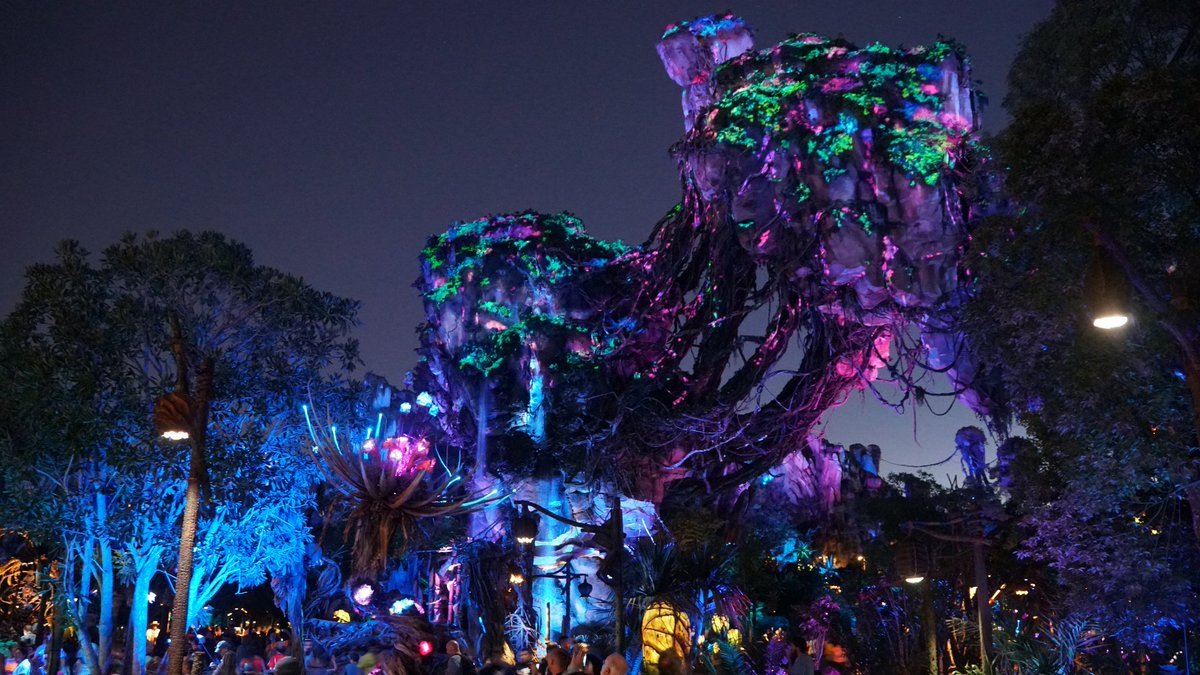
The distinct nighttime bioluminescence of Pandora is created through a combination of LED floodlights, fiber optics, and blacklight effects.

A major visual feature of Pandora is the Valley of Mo'ara and its floating mountain ranges. The 156 foot (48 m)-tall mountains employ forced perspective to appear larger than they physically are, and are held aloft by steel beams concealed with rockwork and vinery. Designers were sent to Zhangjiajie National Forest Park to study the jagged pillar peaks of the Wulingyuan region for inspiration, as well as foliage studies in Hawaii. The steel foundations for the floating mountains required a year to complete. Pandora's bioluminescent species of flora are also found throughout the area. Imagineers created twenty species of Pandoran flora exclusively for the land. The landscaping consists of real Earth plant species mixed with sculpted Pandora flora, with each alien plant requiring its own concealed control box to create the necessary amount of illumination in bioluminesce during the evening hours. New motion sensor technology developed by Disney Research, allows the plant life to respond to tactile interaction from guests. Audio recordings of Pandoran animals create ambient noise throughout the land.

Unlike previous themed lands and attractions in the company's history, Disney omitted traditional theme park attributes throughout Pandora – The World of Avatar—such as attraction marquees, Disney-branded merchandise, and Mickey Mouse images on the MyMagic+ scanners found in queues—as a way of maintaining the natural theming of the land. The rides Avatar Flight of Passage and Na'vi River Journey are advertised only by stylized depictions of an ikran and the Shaman of Songs woven out of reeds. The parks' cast members play ACE field experts.

The area features music composed by James Horner and Simon Franglen based on the original score from Avatar, which was originally composed by Horner and arranged by Franglen. A soundtrack compilation album of Pandora – The World of Avatar was released by Walt Disney Records on January 4, 2019, containing complete ride-through music for Avatar Flight of Passage and Na'vi River Journey, atmospheric area sounds, and ambient music composed for the Windtraders Shop, Pongu Pongu and Sa'tuli Canteen. The music was recorded at Abbey Road Studios and Air Studios in London. Sandra Benton provided the vocals for the Shaman of Songs in Na'vi River Journey.

== Attractions ==
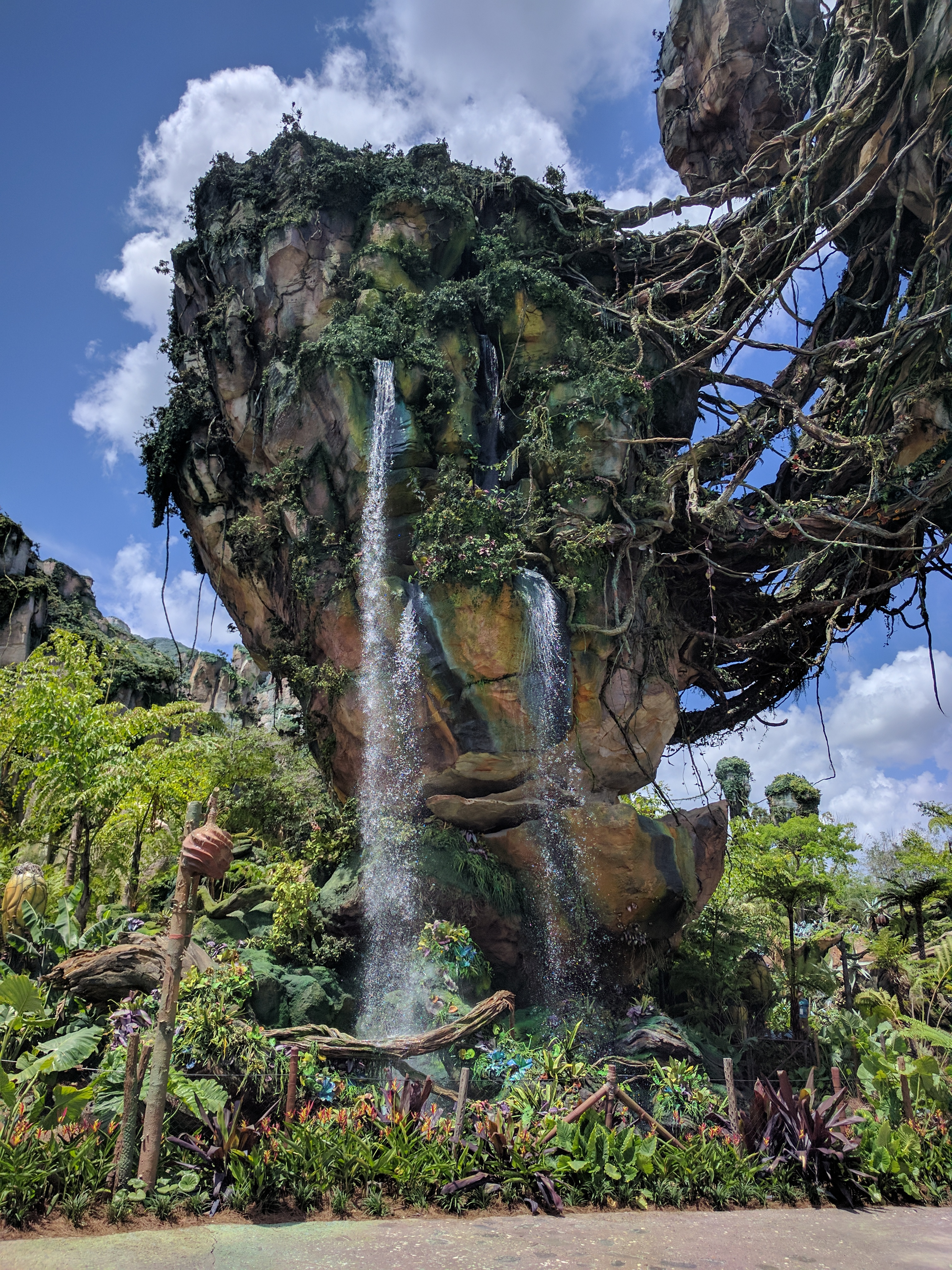
Landscape features of Pandora.

- Avatar Flight of Passage, a 3D flying simulator thrill attraction, where guests fly on a mountain Banshee over the landscape of Pandora.
- Na'vi River Journey, a dark ride boat attraction through the Kapsavan River, showcasing the native fauna and flora of Pandora, including Audio-Animatronics and 3D holograms

=== Entertainment (Retired) ===
- Swotu Wayä Na'vi Drum Ceremony – a daily outdoor drum circle performance held at the Valley of Mo'ara meant to recreate a traditional Na'vi drum ceremony.
- Pandora Utility Suit – a streetmosphere performance where a Pandoran Conservation Initiative scientist wearing an AMP mech suit interacts with guests and educates them about Pandora.

=== Restaurants and shops ===
The land contains two food locations and one shop:

- Satu'li Canteen – a quick service restaurant.
- Pongu Pongu – a food and beverage stand.
- Windtraders – a gift shop.

== See also ==
- The Wizarding World of Harry Potter, a Harry Potter themed land at Universal's Islands of Adventure, Universal Studios Florida and Epic Universe.
- Star Wars: Galaxy's Edge, a Star Wars themed land at Disneyland Park and Disney's Hollywood Studios.
- Avengers Campus, a Marvel Cinematic Universe themed land at Disney California Adventure and Disney Adventure World.
- World of Frozen, a Frozen themed land at Hong Kong Disneyland and Disney Adventure World.
- Acquisition of 21st Century Fox by Disney – The Walt Disney Company, two years after Pandora's opening, acquired 20th Century's parent company, 21st Century Fox in a deal that included the rights to Avatar.
