= Na'vi River Journey =

Dark boat ride at Disney's Animal Kingdom

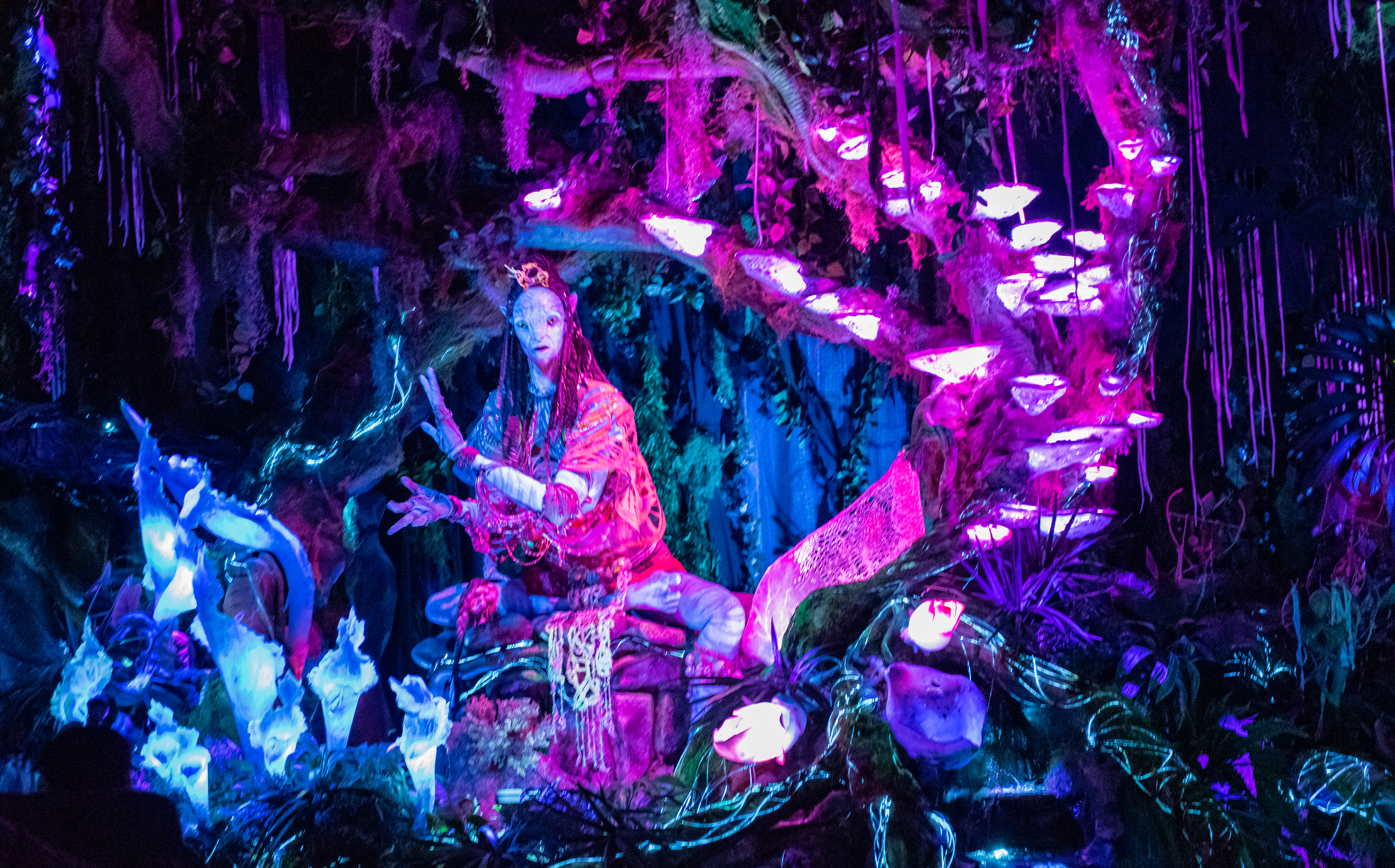
- Audio-Animatronics figure of the Shaman of Songs, seen at the end of the attraction experience

Disney's Animal Kingdom
- Area: Pandora – The World of Avatar
- Coordinates: 28.3548°N 81.5918°W
- Status: Operating
- Soft opening date: May 26, 2017
- Opening date: May 27, 2017

General statistics
- Type: Boat ride
- Manufacturer: Sansei Technologies
- Designer: Walt Disney Imagineering; Lightstorm Entertainment
- Capacity: 1,200 riders per hour
- Duration: 5:48
- Audio-animatronics: Yes
- Music: James Horner; Simon Franglen
- Lightning Lane available
- Must transfer from wheelchair

Na'vi River Journey is a dark ride attraction at Disney's Animal Kingdom's Pandora – The World of Avatar. The ride takes guests through the Kasvapan River of Pandora from the 2009 film Avatar, showcasing native animals and bioluminescent flora, with inclusion of complex Audio-Animatronics.

The Na'vi Shaman seen towards the end of the ride is the most advanced Audio-Animatronics figure ever designed by Walt Disney Imagineering.

== Summary ==
=== Queue ===
The exterior queue winds through the exotic landscape of Pandora before leading into a covered queue which looks to have been constructed by the Na’vi and is filled with totems, signs describing the animals guests will encounter during the boat ride, and some woven artistic pieces.

=== Ride ===
Boarding a hand-woven reed boat provided by Alpha Centauri Expeditions, guests journey down the Kaspavan River into the colorful bioluminescent rainforest. After a Na'vi scout greets guests on the shore, the boat passes by viperwolves, hexapedes, woodsprites, panopyra, and fan lizards. After passing under leaves that creatures above are hopping between, the boats come across a Na'vi tribe and their direhorses walking to a ceremonial site. Passing by a waterfall, guests see the Shaman of Songs leading the Na'vi into a musical celebration of their bond with Eywa. After this encounter, the boats enter a cave with various offerings and return to the loading docks.

== Soundtrack ==
During the ride, the Shaman of Songs sings lyrics written in the Na'vi language created by Dr. Paul Frommer for the 2009 film. Dr. Frommer posted the lyrics on his blog in 2017.

On January 4, 2019, the soundtrack for Na'vi River Journey was released by Walt Disney Records along with the other music featured in Pandora – The World of Avatar. Written by Simon Franglen and the late James Horner, the release credits Sandra Benton as the vocals for the Shaman of Songs and the Slovak National Symphony in Bratislava as the recording orchestra for the music.
