= Sunley =

Sunley is a surname. Notable people with the surname include:

- Bernard Sunley (1910–1964), British property developer
- Dave Sunley (born 1952), English footballer
- John Sunley (1946–2009), English cricketer
- Mark Sunley (born 1971), English footballer

== See also ==
- Sulley (disambiguation)
