= Lightstorm =

Lightstorm may refer to:

- Lightstorm Entertainment, an American film production company
- Star Trek: Deep Space Nine – Lightstorm, a Star Trek one-shot comic book published by Malibu Comics (December 1994)
