= Lego Avatar =

Lego theme

- Subject: Avatar
- Licensed from: 20th Century Studios, The Walt Disney Company, and Lightstorm Entertainment
- Availability: 1 October 2022–Present
- Total sets: 9
- Characters: Ao'nung, Colonel Miles Quaritch, Crabsuit Driver, Dr. Grace Augustine, Jake Sully, Jake Sully (Avatar), Kiri, Lo’ak, Mo’at, Neteyam, Neytiri, Norm Spellman, Ronal, Spider, Tonowari, Tsireya, Tsu’tey, Trudy Chacón, and Tuk
- Official website

Lego Avatar (stylized as LEGO Avatar) is a Lego theme based on the film series of the same name created by James Cameron. It is licensed from 20th Century Studios, The Walt Disney Company and Lightstorm Entertainment. The theme was first introduced on 1 October 2022. Subsequent sets were released in 2023, alongside the next film, Avatar: The Way of Water.

== Overview ==
Lego Avatar is based on the James Cameron's Avatar film series. The product line focuses on an epic conflict on Pandora, an inhabited Earth-sized moon of Polyphemus, one of three gas giants orbiting Alpha Centauri A. On Pandora, human colonists and the sentient humanoid indigenous inhabitants of Pandora, the Na'vi, engage in a war over the planet's resources and the latter's continued existence. Lego Avatar aimed to recreate the main characters in Lego form, including Colonel Miles Quaritch, Dr. Grace Augustine, Jake Sully, Jake Sully (Avatar), Neytiri, Norm Spellman, Mo’at, Tsu’tey, and Trudy Chacón. The Na'vi minifigures were modified with extra long legs and other new molds.

In December 2022, The Lego Group confirmed that the Lego Avatar’s longer minifigure legs aren’t the same as those used for Lego Toy Story (later known as Lego Disney)'s minifigures in 2010.

== Development ==
Lego Avatar designer Atticus Tsai-McCarthy discussed the concept of the Lego Avatar theme and said, "That actually emerged fairly early in the concept phase. In certain themes, like Jurassic World as one example, we are designing primarily for young kids who love dinosaurs and vehicles, whereas Avatar is intended for a slightly older demographic. This was my first experience designing for older builders and focusing on displayability was really rewarding, without losing the play value. You can play with the models, but also display them easily on a shelf and even combine them if you have several sets." and continued, "With 75572 Jake & Neytiri’s First Banshee Flight specifically I wanted to give the two ikran a sense of movement when designing the set. I was aiming to create a frozen moment from the movie, without needing a full diorama base."

== Launch ==
The Lego Avatar theme revealed at San Diego Comic-Con and was launched in October 2022. The Lego Group had a partnership with 20th Century Studios, The Walt Disney Company and Lightstorm Entertainment. As part of the marketing campaign, The Lego Group released 4 sets based on the James Cameron's Avatar film series. Each set featured different Pandoran beasts, such as Banshees, Thanators, Direhorses, and Toruks. Minifigures were released as well, including Colonel Miles Quaritch, Dr. Grace Augustine, Jake Sully, Jake Sully (Avatar), Neytiri, Norm Spellman, Mo’at, Tsu’tey, and Trudy Chacón. The sets were designed primarily for children with an age rating of 9+ or above.

In September 2022, at the D23 Expo, Avatar: The Way of Water producer Jon Landau confirmed in an interview that additional five sets based on Avatar: The Way of Water film will be released in 2023. These sets included 3 new Pandoran beasts, such as the Ilu, Skimwing, and Payakan the Tulkun and minifigures of Tsireya, Tuk, Ronal, Tonowari, Neytiri and Kiri, Spider, Lo'ak and Tsireya, Neteyam, Ao'nung, Recombinant Quaritch and a Crabsuit Driver.

== Characters ==
=== Humans ===
- Jake Sully: A disabled former Marine who becomes part of the Avatar Program after his twin brother is killed. His military background helps the Na'vi warriors relate to him.
- Colonel Miles Quaritch: The head of the mining operation's security detail. Fiercely consistent in his disregard for any life not recognized as human, he has a profound disregard for Pandora's inhabitants that is evident in both his actions and his language.
- Dr. Grace Augustine: An exobiologist and head of the Avatar Program. She is also Sully's mentor and an advocate of peaceful relations with the Na'vi, having set up a school to teach them English.
- Trudy Chacón: A combat pilot assigned to support the Avatar Program who is sympathetic to the Na'vi.
- Dr. Norm Spellman: A xenoanthropologist who studies plant and animal life as part of the Avatar Program. He arrives on Pandora at the same time as Jake and operates an avatar. Although he is expected to lead the diplomatic contact with the Na'vi, it turns out that Jake has the personality better suited to win the natives' respect.
- Miles "Spider" Socorro: The 16-year-old son of Quaritch born on Pandora, who was adopted into Jake and Neytiri's family.

=== Na'vi ===
The Na'vi are humanoid creatures that inhabit Pandora along with other creatures. They use animals ranging from direhorses to even viperwolves.

- Jake Sully: A disabled former Marine who becomes part of the Avatar Program after his twin brother is killed. After sympathizing with them, Jake rebelled against the RDA. After Quaritch killed his human form, Sully merged with his Na'vi Avatar permanently, and now identifies himself as one of them.
- Neytiri: The daughter of the leaders of the Omaticaya (the Na'vi clan central to the story). She is attracted to Jake because of his bravery, though frustrated with him for what she sees as his naiveté and stupidity. She serves as Jake's love interest.
- Mo’at: The Omaticaya's spiritual leader, Neytiri's mother, and consort to clan leader Eytukan.
- Tsu'tey: The finest warrior of the Omaticaya. He is heir to the chieftainship of the tribe. At the beginning of the film's story, he is betrothed to Neytiri.
- Ronal: A free diver of the Metkayina and Tonowari's wife, who is pregnant.
- Tonowari: The chief of the Metkayina clan and Ronal's husband.
- Kiri: The 14-year-old daughter of Dr. Grace Augustine's Na'vi avatar who was adopted by Jake and Neytiri.
- Lo'ak: Jake and Neytiri's 14-year-old son.
- Tuktirey "Tuk": Jake and Neytiri's 8-year-old daughter and their youngest child.
- Tsireya: A graceful and strong free diver of the Metkayina, Tonowari and Ronal's daughter, and Ao'nung's sister.
- Ao'nung: A young male hunter and free diver of the Metkayina, Tonowari and Ronal's son, and Tsireya's brother.

== Toy line ==
According to BrickLink, The Lego Group released a total of nine Lego sets as part of Lego Avatar theme.

=== Avatar sets ===
In 2022, The Lego Group revealed at the Lego Con in 2022 a brand new set named Toruk Makto & Tree of Souls (set number: 75574) was released on 1 October 2022. Additional four sets revealed at San Diego Comic-Con in 2022 and were released at same time.

==== Neytiri & Thanator vs. AMP Suit Quaritch ====
Neytiri & Thanator vs. AMP Suit Quaritch (set number: 75571) was released on 1 October 2022 and based on James Cameron's Avatar film series. The set consists of 560 pieces with 2 minifigures. The set included Neytiri's Thanator (Palulukan in Na'vi), Pandoran rainforest environment with some glow in the dark pieces and Colonel Miles Quaritch's AMP suit. Colonel Miles Quaritch's AMP suit included a combat knife and an enormous yellow chainsaw. The set included Lego minifigures of Neytiri and Colonel Miles Quaritch.

==== Jake & Neytiri’s First Banshee Flight ====
Jake & Neytiri's First Banshee Flight (set number: 75572) was released on 1 October 2022 and based on James Cameron's Avatar film series. The set consists of 572 pieces with 2 minifigures. The set included two Banshee (Ikran in Na'vi) and Hallelujah Mountains with some glow in the dark pieces. The set included Lego minifigures of Jake Sully and Neytiri. Lego Avatar designer Atticus Tsai-McCarthy discussed about Ikran used plastic wings instead of brick-built wings and explained, "Yes, that was pretty much the reason! Recreating the artistry of these creatures onscreen was very important. We thought it would be really nice to translate the wing shape and patterning as accurately as possible, which meant using the decorated vinyl."

==== Floating Mountains: Site 26 & RDA Samson ====
Floating Mountains: Site 26 & RDA Samson (set number: 75573) was released on 1 October 2022 and based on James Cameron's Avatar film series. The set consists of 887 pieces with 5 minifigures. The set included RDA Samson helicopter, Floating Mountains, Site 26 and Direhorse (Pa'li in Na'vi). Floating Mountains with some glow in the dark pieces and a Technic pin that allows to connect the RDA Samson helicopter. The set included Lego minifigures of Jake Sully, Dr. Grace Augustine, Trudy Chacon, Jake Sully (Avatar) and Norm Spellman.

==== Toruk Makto & Tree of Souls ====
Toruk Makto & Tree of Souls (set number: 75574) was released on 1 October 2022 and based on James Cameron's Avatar film series. The set consists of 1212 pieces with 4 minifigures. The set included a Toruk (meaning last shadow in Na'vi), 3 rainforest environment builds and the Tree of Souls. The set included Lego minifigures of Jake Sully (Avatar), Neytiri, Mo’at and Tsu’tey. The Toruk is the Great Leonopteryx allow Jake Sully (Avatar) to ride on and become Toruk Makto. The 3 rainforest environment builds included some glow in the dark pieces and a Technic pin that allows to connect the Toruk Makto. Toruk Makto & Tree of Souls (set number: 75574) was designed by Lego Group Designer Woon Tze Chee. Lego Avatar designer Atticus Tsai-McCarthy discussed about Toruk Makto & Tree of Souls (set number: 75574) with a Technic pin and explained, "I think this came about when we were constructing the Floating Mountains or the archway in 75574 Toruk Makto & Tree of Souls, where you can place the leonopteryx. Early on, we were using normal Technic beams in black and figuratively asking builders not to notice them, with the colour contrast." and continued, "However, we later discovered that the Super Mario team was producing something similar to the City scaffolding piece, with Technic pin holes. Given its transparent colours, that was just perfect for Avatar and supporting the floating sections."

=== Avatar: The Way of Water sets ===
In November 2022, five new sets were announced for release on 1 January 2023 and based on Avatar: The Way of Water film, including Ilu Discovery (set number: 75575), Skimwing Adventure (set number: 75576), Mako Submarine (set number: 75577), Metkayina Reef Home (set number: 75578) and Payakan the Tulkun & Crabsuit (set number:75579). Each of the sets included new designed bow and arrow.

==== Ilu Discovery ====
Ilu Discovery (set number: 75575) was released on 1 January 2023 and based on based on Avatar: The Way of Water film. The set consists of 179 pieces with 2 minifigures. The set included Tuk's Ilu and Pandoran coral-reef with a Technic pin that allows to connect the Ilu. The set included Lego minifigures of Tsireya and Tuk.

==== Skimwing Adventure ====
Skimwing Adventure (set number: 75576) was released on 1 January 2023 and based on based on Avatar: The Way of Water film. The set consists of 259 pieces with 2 minifigures. The set included Jake Sully's Skimwing ("Tsurak" in Navi) and Pandoran coral-reef with a Technic pin that allows to connect the Skimwing. The set included Lego minifigures Tonowari and Jake Sully.

==== Mako Submarine ====
Mako Submarine (set number: 75577) was released on 1 January 2023 and based on based on Avatar: The Way of Water film. The set consists of 553 pieces with 4 minifigures. The set included RDA Quaritch's Mako Submarine, stingray and 3 seabeds. The set included Lego minifigures Neteyam, Ao'nung, RDA Quaritch and Spider.

==== Metkayina Reef Home ====
Metkayina Reef Home (set number: 75578) was released on 1 January 2023 and based on based on Avatar: The Way of Water film. The set consists of 179 pieces with 4 minifigures. The set included Metkayina village, a canoe and Pandoran coral reef. The set included Lego minifigures Ronal, Tonowari, Neytiri and Kiri.

==== Payakan the Tulkun & Crabsuit ====
Payakan the Tulkun & Crabsuit (set number:75579) was released on 1 January 2023 and based on based on Avatar: The Way of Water film. The set consists of 761 pieces with 3 minifigures. The set included Payakan the Tulkun, crabsuit submersible and 2 seabeds. The set included Lego minifigures Crabsuit Driver, Lo'ak and Tsireya.

=== Lego BrickHeadz sets ===
==== Jake Sully & his Avatar ====
Jake Sully & his Avatar (set number: 40554) was released on 1 October 2022 as part of the Lego BrickHeadz theme and based on James Cameron's Avatar film series. The set consists of 246 pieces and 1 baseplate. The set included 2 versions of Jake Sully in his human form with wheelchair and his Avatar form with spear.

== Web short ==
The product line was accompanied by a series of animated short films that was released on YouTube.

- Build your bond with LEGO Avatar was an official web short was released on YouTube on 1 January 2023 that inspired by both Lego Avatar sets as well as the James Cameron's Avatar film series.

== See also ==
- Lego Exo-Force
- Lego Prince of Persia
- Lego Pirates of the Caribbean
- Lego The Lone Ranger
- Lego Disney
- Lego The Simpsons
- Lego Ninjago
- Lego Monkie Kid
- Lego Nexo Knights
- Lego Overwatch
- Lego Minifigures (theme)
- Lego BrickHeadz
- Lego DOTS
