= Sully Creek =

Sully Creek may refer to:

- Sully Creek (South Dakota)
- Sully Creek State Park, the former name of a state park in North Dakota
