= Sulley =

Sulley may refer to:

== Entertainment ==
- James P. "Sulley" Sullivan, one of the main protagonists of the 2001 film Monsters, Inc.
- "Sulley", a song from the film soundtrack of the film Monsters University

== People ==
- Sulley Muntari, a Ghanaian soccer player
- Amadu Sulley (died 2025), Ghanaian public servant
- Susan Ann Sulley, British pop singer

== See also ==
- Sully (disambiguation)
- Sulli (disambiguation)
