= Neytiri =

Avatar franchise character

- Avatar character
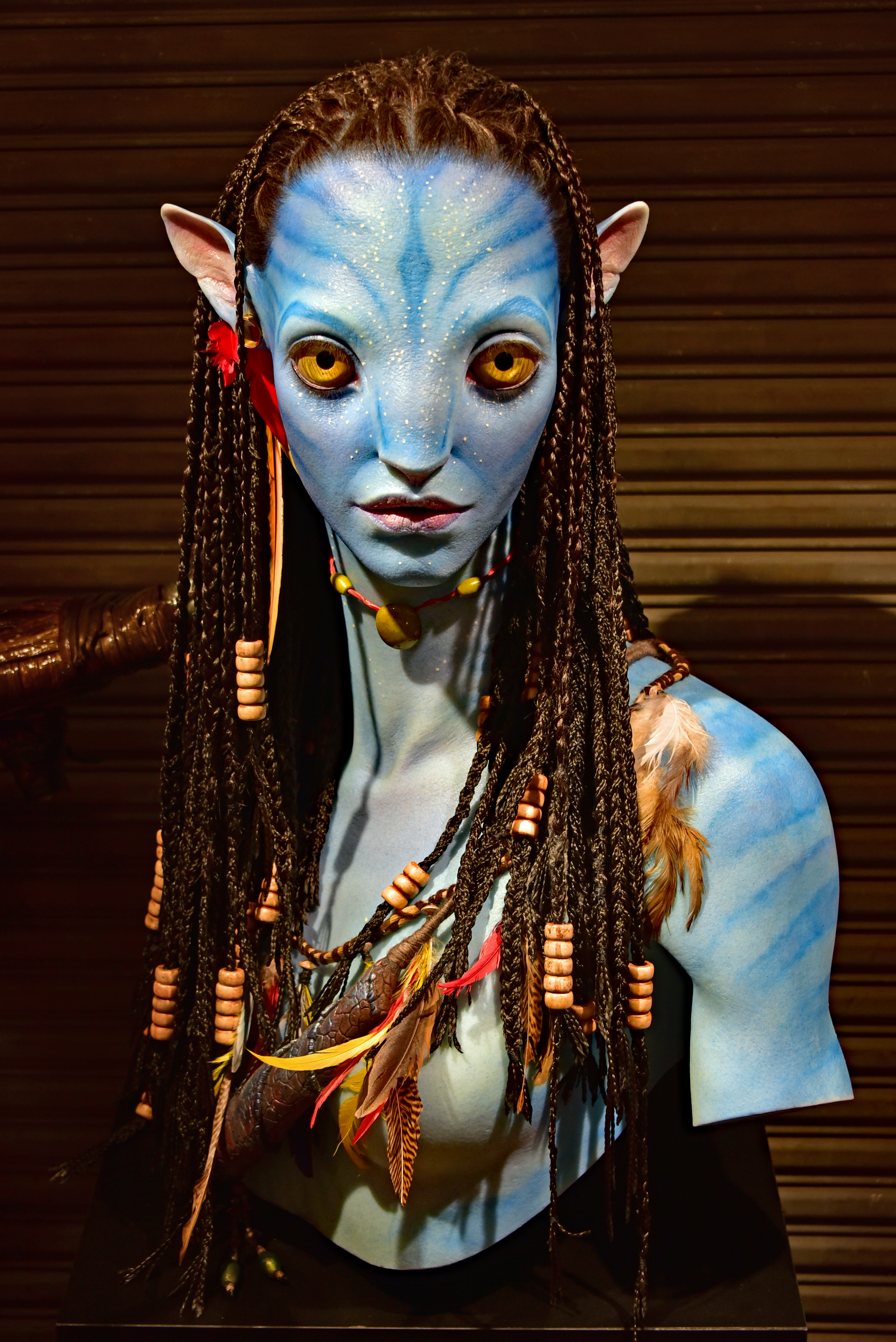
- A bust of Neytiri from Avatar (2009)
- First appearance: Avatar (2009)
- Created by: James Cameron
- Portrayed by: Zoe Saldaña

In-universe information
- Species: Na'vi
- Gender: Female
- Affiliation: Omaticaya Clan; Metkayina Clan
- Family: Mo'at (mother); Eytukan (father)
- Spouse: Jake Sully
- Children: Neteyam (son); Lo'ak (son); Tuktirey (daughter); Kiri (adopted daughter); Miles "Spider" Socorro (adopted son)
- Homeworld: Pandora

Neytiri te Tskaha Mo’at’ite is a character from the science fiction film franchise Avatar, created by James Cameron. She is portrayed by Zoe Saldaña in the films Avatar (2009), Avatar: The Way of Water (2022) and Avatar: Fire and Ash (2025). Neytiri also appears in various comic book series published by Dark Horse Comics.

Neytiri is one of the Na'vi, the indigenous people of the moon Pandora. She meets the human Jake Sully, who is piloting an avatar—a hybrid body grown from both human and Na'vi DNA. Neytiri becomes Jake's teacher, helping learn the Na'vi ways and integrating him into the clan. She falls in love with him, and together they drive the human colonizers off Pandora. Neytiri and Jake start a family, and later fight the humans again when they return.

== Production history ==
=== Origins ===
The origins for Neytiri date back to the late 1970s, when James Cameron was preparing Xenogenesis, a short film intended to be used as a pitch for a feature-length film that never happened. The film features a painting of a female blue skinned alien. He later stated that after the film was turned down, he kept thinking about the idea of a blue skinned alien and decided to recycle it when developing Avatar in the early 1990s (which was then known as Project 880). Further inspiration for the look of Neytiri came from the description of a dream his mother had in which she saw a blue-skinned woman 12 feet (4 m) tall. In earlier drafts of the screenplay, Neytiri was known as "Zuleika Te Kaha Polenoma".

Cameron told the designers to base the character's face on that of a photograph of Q'orianka Kilcher. In 2026, Kilcher sued Cameron and the Walt Disney Corporation for unauthorised use of her face.

=== Casting ===
Cameron undertook a worldwide search for actresses to play the role, with Q'orianka Kilcher being considered and Emily Blunt auditioning for the role. Eventually, Cameron cast Zoe Saldaña in the role. Since she was cast early in production, Saldaña helped screen-test actors auditioning for the part of Jake Sully, including eventual co-star Sam Worthington.

== Appearances ==
=== Films ===
==== Avatar (2009) ====
One day while Neytiri is hunting in the woods of Pandora, she spots Jake Sully's avatar and begins to stalk him. As she is about to kill the armed intruder with a bow, a woodsprite floats down and gently touches her arrowhead, telling her that the avatar is pure. She continues to follow the avatar because of this symbol. When Jake is attacked by a pack of viperwolves, she protects him by fending off the creatures. Although Jake tries to thank her for saving him, she rejects him, as she wants nothing to do with the humans and feels regretful for killing some of the viperwolves. Suddenly, dozens of woodsprites land on Jake. Amazed by what she just witnessed, Neytiri sees this as a good omen from Eywa and takes him to Hometree; the home of the Omaticaya Clan.

Upon arrival, Tsu'tey, a young warrior originally betrothed to Neytiri, attacks Jake and attempts to kill him, but Neytiri stops him by explaining the sign she had received from Eywa. Jake is then taken to meet with Eytukan and Mo'at, Neytiri's parents, who decide that they must study Jake, as he is the first Avatar who was a soldier and not a scientist. Much to her chagrin, Neytiri is tasked with teaching Jake the Na'vi ways.

Over the following three months, Neytiri teaches Jake the ways of the Na'vi. She shows him how to move through the Pandoran jungle, make tsaheylu (a bond that allows him to ride direhorses and ikran), how to speak the Na'vi language, and teaches him hunting rituals. She also tells him Na'vi stories, including the story of the Toruk Makto, a mythical Na'vi warrior who was closely linked with Eywa and therefore able to make tsaheylu with Toruk, a legendary Pandoran creature. During this time, she also falls in love with Jake and eventually, they mate.

After Jake reveals his true mission and explains that the RDA was coming to destroy Hometree, Neytiri furiously rejects him and the Na'vi subsequently take both Jake and Grace captive before preparing for the defense of their home. When the RDA arrives, the Na'vi make a futile stand against them but are quickly overwhelmed and flee into the forest. The RDA destroys Hometree, taking several Na'vi casualties, including Eytukan. Jake finds Neytiri and attempts to comfort her, but she again rejects him, demanding he go away and never come back.

Neytiri and the other surviving members of the Omaticaya Clan then seek refuge at the Tree of Souls, where they pray that Eywa will save them. Their prayers are answered when Jake returns, having made tsaheylu with Toruk. Recognizing his close connection to Eywa, Neytiri forgives him and accepts him again. She then helps Jake rally the other Na'vi clans to prepare for an impending attack from the RDA, who plan to strike and destroy the Tree of Souls. During the subsequent battle, the Na'vi suffer heavy casualties, but are rescued when Pandoran wildlife unexpectedly join the attack and overwhelm the humans, which Neytiri interprets as Eywa's answer to Jake's prayer. Jake destroys a Valkyrie shuttle converted into a makeshift bomber before it can reach the Tree of Souls; Quaritch, wearing an AMP suit, escapes from his own damaged aircraft, then later finds and breaks open the avatar link unit containing Jake's human body, exposing it to Pandora's poisonous atmosphere. As Quaritch prepares to slit the throat of Jake's avatar, Neytiri kills Quaritch, saving Jake from suffocation and seeing his human form for the first time.

With the exceptions of Jake, Norm and a select few others, all humans are expelled from Pandora and sent back to Earth. Neytiri watches over Jake as he is permanently transferred into his avatar with the aid of the Tree of Souls.

==== Avatar: The Way of Water (2022) ====
Fifteen years later, Neytiri and Jake, the new Omatikaya chief, have settled down and raised a family consisting of: Neteyam, their first son and oldest child, Lo'ak, their second son, and Tuktirey ("Tuk"), their daughter and youngest child. They have also adopted Kiri, the mysteriously conceived Na’vi daughter of Grace Augustine’s inert Na’vi avatar.

Miles "Spider" Socorro, the human son of Miles Quaritch, is also raised on Pandora alongside Neytiri’s children, but she is distrustful of the boy and doesn’t believe he belongs amongst Na’vi. After the RDA returns and attempts to colonize Pandora again, Jake and the Omaticaya fight against the RDA supply lines, their Recombinants (Na’vi avatars containing the memories of Quaritch along with other deceased soldiers) capture their children. Jake and Neytiri arrive and free them, except for Spider, who is taken by Quaritch. Recognizing his son, Quaritch decides to spend time with Spider in order to draw him to their side. Aware of the danger Spider's knowledge of his whereabouts poses to their safety, Jake convinces Neytiri to exile their family from the Omaticaya and retreat to the Metkayina, and are reluctantly taken in by clan chief Tonowari. The family learns their ways, Kiri develops a spiritual bond with the sea and its creatures, and Lo'ak befriends Tsireya, the daughter of Tonowari and his wife Ronal, while also butting heads with Tsireya's brother Aonung.

Aonung and his friends entice Lo’ak to a trip into the farther reaches of the ocean and leave him stranded as a prank. Lo'ak then befriends Payakan, a tulkun, an intelligent and pacifistic cetacean species whom the Metkayina consider their spiritual family. Upon his return, Tonowari forces Aonung to apologize for his actions, but Lo'ak takes the blame on himself, winning Aonung's friendship. He later finds out that Payakan is an outcast among his species since he went against his species‘ pacifist ways and attacked the whalers who killed his mother. Kiri then attempts to link with the Metkayina's Spirit Tree to meet her mother but suffers a violent seizure. Jake calls Norm Spellman and Max Patel for help, but Kiri is healed by Ronal. Due to Norm and Max arriving at the reef in a Samson gunship, the RDA are able to track them down. Bringing Spider with him, Quaritch commandeers a whaling vessel which is hunting tulkuns to harvest Amrita, a compound in their brains, for anti-aging remedies. After Quaritch and the whaling crew begin killing tulkuns in order to draw Jake out, Lo'ak, along with his siblings, Tsireya, Aonung, and Rotxo head off to warn Payakan.

They find Payakan being chased by the whalers, and Lo'ak, Tsireya, and Tuk are captured by Quaritch. With their children in danger, Jake, Neytiri, and the Metkayina set out to confront the humans. Quaritch forces Jake to surrender, but upon seeing Lo'ak imperiled, Payakan attacks the whalers, triggering a fight that kills most of the crew and sinks the vessel. Neteyam rescues Lo'ak, Tsireya, and Spider, but is fatally shot. Jake faces Quaritch, who uses Kiri as a hostage and desists after Neytiri does the same with Spider. Trapped inside the sinking vessel, Jake strangles Quaritch into unconsciousness and is rescued by Lo'ak and Payakan while Kiri saves Neytiri and Tuk. Spider hesitantly rescues Quaritch after initially mistaking him for Jake, but renounces his cruelty and rejoins Jake's family. After Neteyam's funeral, Jake informs Tonowari and Ronal of his decision to leave the Metkayina, but he instead identifies him as part of the clan and allows them to stay. Neytiri, Jake, and Lo’ak then go to the Spirit Tree to relive their happiest memories with Neteyam.

==== Avatar: Fire and Ash (2025) ====
Neytiri is consumed by hatred for humans following the death of Neteyam, resulting in an openly hostile attitude that manifests as a full-blown prejudice. She initially views Spider as a representation of all that has been taken from her and even suggests killing him to keep him out of the RDA's hands, a position fueled by her extreme grief. After Spider nearly suffocates in his sleep due to a discharged mask, Neytiri and Jake decide that he cannot remain with them and arrange for his safe transport with the Tlalim clan of merchants back to the human scientific camp. The plan is disrupted when the Mangkwan (Ash People) led by Varang attack the merchants, separating the Sully family and leaving Neytiri severely injured. She eventually reunites with Jake at High Camp, where they are brought together by a rescue group after Jake and Quaritch briefly work together to track down Spider in the rainforest. She receives treatment in a human medical facility, and later, while recovering at the Metkayina village, Ronal tends to Neytiri's injuries using traditional herbs and medicine.

After Jake allows himself to be captured by Quaritch's forces and the Mangkwan to avoid further slaughter of the reef people and is taken to Bridgehead City, Neytiri infiltrates the base, disguised as a Mangkwan scout. She successfully frees Jake with the help of Spider and Ian Garvin, reuniting with him to escape the facility. After Spider risks his life to save Jake at Bridgehead, Neytiri begins to reassess him. Following their escape, the couple argues over the threat Spider poses, as he has become the first human capable of breathing Pandoran air after being saved from suffocation by Kiri, who enabled a transformation to adapt him to Pandora, including growing a kuru, due to her unique connection to Eywa. When Jake reluctantly decides to kill Spider to stop the RDA from learning how to breathe Pandoran air and using that knowledge to fully colonize the planet, Neytiri realizes that letting her hate consume her and allowing Spider to die would make her no better than the invaders she despises. She rushes to stop Jake from killing him (though he ultimately could not bring himself to go through with it), embraces Spider, and accepts him as her son, finally letting go of her intense hatred.

Jake (once again taking the mantle of Toruk Makto) gathers the Na'vi clans for a massive counter-attack. He and Neytiri fight side-by-side in the battle at the Cove of the Ancestors, leading their unified forces against the RDA flagship and the Mangkwan clan. During the height of the battle, Neytiri assists Ronal, who has been mortally wounded. Neytiri helps Ronal reach the shore and stays to defend her from attacking Mangkwan warriors while Ronal gives birth to her daughter, Pril. After Ronal passes away from her injuries, Neytiri takes custody of the newborn baby, promising to protect her. She places the infant in an improvised carrier to keep her safe while continuing to fight. Neytiri is later captured along with Tuk by Varang and Quaritch. While she is being tortured by Varang, Kiri intervenes, using her abilities to subdue Varang, allowing Neytiri to seize the opportunity to escape with Tuk and Pril. After the sinking of the RDA flagship and the chaotic battle, Neytiri and her children arrive at the floating rocks to reunite with Jake and Spider. Neytiri corners Quaritch, taking aim with her bow. Rather than surrender, Quaritch leaps from the floating rock into the fire and magnetic flux below.

Following the battle, the Sully family formally accepts Spider as one of their own. During a ceremony, he connects to the Spirit Tree and enters the spirit world, where a ritual is performed that officially makes Spider "one of the People".

=== Comics ===
==== Avatar: The Next Shadow (2021) ====
Two weeks after the Na'vi's victory over the RDA, several clans are still struggling with the losses and damages they suffered during the battle. Neytiri volunteers to help the Olangi Clan, who suffered the most casualties from the war. She finds Jake at the gravesite of his human body, still suffering internal conflicts about his transition into his avatar body. Neytiri warns Jake that this isn't healthy for him before leaving.

Neytiri returns a couple of days later after receiving news that the family of Tsu'tey had poisoned Jake with a knife, leaving him in a coma. She finds Jake at the gravesite, they embrace and she asks him what happened. Jake dismisses the situation and downplays the events, telling Neytiri it's "just a scratch". Neytiri points out that he doesn't seem like himself, but Jake reassures her that he has never felt more like himself and finally leaves his human body behind.

==== Avatar: Adapt or Die (2022) ====
Years before the events of Avatar, Dr. Grace Augustine contacts the Omaticaya Clan and proposes the idea of a school where the Na'vi and humans could interact. Mo'at and Eytukan are against the idea, but consult their daughters Neytiri and Sylwanin, along with other Na'vi children for their opinions on the matter. They request to visit Hell's Gate, and Mo'at takes them there to meet Grace and learn about human operations. Grace gives Neytiri and the other kids a tour of the base and teaches them how to play basketball. After returning home, Mo'at asks the children about what they think about attending the human school. While Neytiri is excited about the idea, Sylwanin points out that at the school, the humans will learn from the Na'vi, but not the other way around. Mo'at and Eytukan agree and decide to open the school, but the latter gets suspicious after children including Neytiri who went to Hell's Gate begin developing symptoms of a mysterious illness.

Mo'at discusses this with Grace, asking if the disease came from Hell's Gate, who is shocked and denies it; Mo'at believes there was no malice, but is unconvinced that the disease didn't come from humans. Grace leaves Mo'at with supplies and returns to her lab in Hell's Gate, where Parker Selfridge assures Grace that the RDA was not responsible for the sickness. Meanwhile, Eytukan questions Mo'at about Grace's supplies informs her that Neytiri's sickness is getting worse.

Grace returns and is told by Mo'at that the sickness has begun infecting adults as well. Mo'at and Grace then begin a journey to visit the Tawkami Clan, Pandora's master botanists, hoping that they will have more knowledge of the sickness.

At Grace's school, Neytiri and Sylwanin learn to speak English, being regarded as the “top students”, but the school is attacked and Sylwanin is shot and killed. This strains the human's relationship between the Na'vi, who ban them from their land. Meanwhile, Neytiri gets engaged to Sylwanin's fiancé, Tsu'tey, in order to also be the next Tsahìk.

== Merchandise ==
Mattel made an action figure of Neytiri as part of a range of Avatar action figures produced for the first film. She was also included in a range of Avatar toys produced for McDonald's Happy Meals. Lego has produced figures of Neytiri for its Lego Avatar theme.

== Reception ==
For her performance in Avatar, Saldaña won Best Actress at the 36th Saturn Awards. She was also nominated for Outstanding Supporting Actress at the Black Reel Awards and for Outstanding Supporting Actress in a Motion Picture at the NAACP Image Awards. For her portrayal of Neytiri in Avatar: The Way of Water, Saldana won the Washington D.C. Area Film Critics Association Award for Best Motion Capture Performance, beating out co-stars Sam Worthington and Sigourney Weaver. She was also nominated at the Austin Film Critics Association Awards 2022 for Best Voice Acting/Animated/Digital Performance. At the 51st Saturn Awards, Saldana was nominated for Best Actress for a second time, but lost to Margot Robbie for her performance in Barbie.

== Notes ==
- Some text in this article was copied from Neytiri at Avatar Wiki, which is released under a Creative Commons Attribution-Share Alike 3.0 (Unported) (CC-BY-SA-3.0) license.
