= Miles Quaritch =

Avatar franchise character

- Avatar character
- Stephen Lang as Miles Quaritch in his Na'vi recombinant form (left) and as a human (right) in Avatar: The Way of Water (2022)
- First appearance: Avatar (2009)
- Created by: James Cameron
- Portrayed by: Stephen Lang

In-universe information
- Species: Human; Na'vi recombinant
- Gender: Male
- Title: Colonel
- Affiliation: U.S. Marine Corps; RDA
- Significant others: Paz Socorro; Varang
- Children: Miles "Spider" Socorro (son)

Colonel Miles Quaritch is a fictional character from the American science fiction film franchise Avatar created by James Cameron. He serves as the main antagonist in the films Avatar (2009), and Avatar: The Way of Water (2022) and one of the two main antagonists (alongside Varang) in Avatar: Fire and Ash (2025). Quaritch is portrayed by Stephen Lang in all three films and in the video game Avatar: The Game. Lang won Best Supporting Actor at the 36th Saturn Awards for his performance as Quaritch in Avatar.

After serving in the United States Marine Corps with the 1st Reconnaissance Battalion, Quaritch became a senior officer in the security forces of the Resources Development Administration (RDA), a megacorporation, and was deployed to the exomoon of Pandora, where he served as their chief of security. Leading the RDA in their conflict against the indigenous Na'vi, Quaritch enlists the help of new arrival Jake Sully to spy on the Na'vi and help him defeat them. Sully eventually turns on the RDA, and defeats an attempt by an RDA force led by Quaritch to destroy the Tree of Souls. During the battle, Quaritch is killed by Sully’s Na'vi lover Neytiri. A copy of his consciousness is subsequently transferred by the RDA into a genetically grown Na'vi body, known as a Recombinant, which returns to Pandora to track down Sully alongside other Recombinants. However, he is unsuccessful in this attempt but survives the second confrontation with Sully. Quaritch struggles with his paternal instincts for his human son Miles "Spider" Socorro. He forms a strategic and deeply personal alliance with Varang, the Tsahìk (spiritual leader) of the Mangkwan clan (also known as the Ash People), to secure their assistance in hunting down and capturing Sully. Following the battle at the Cove of the Ancestors, Quaritch's status is left ambiguous after leaping off a floating rock into a flaming abyss when cornered by the Sullys.

== Production history ==
=== Casting ===
James Cameron was initially reported to have met with Michael Biehn for the role of Quaritch in Avatar, having previously collaborated on The Terminator, Aliens, The Abyss, and Terminator 2: Judgment Day, and apparently even showed him multiple drafts of the script and some of the 3D test footage. Ultimately, Biehn was not cast in any role, as Sigourney Weaver had been cast to play Dr. Grace Augustine in the film and Cameron seemingly did not want audiences to draw comparisons to Aliens. Although Cameron confirms he met with Biehn for a part in the film, he disputed the claim that it was for Quaritch.

In a 2025 interview, Josh Brolin claimed to have been offered the part. Brolin turned the part down on the grounds of not wanting to commit to the long filming schedule.

Having remembered Stephen Lang from auditioning for the roles of Dwayne Hicks and Carter Burke in Aliens, Cameron decided to cast Lang as Quaritch. Lang said of his casting:

I'd auditioned for Aliens about 20+ years ago, and he talked about that in our conversation, so, y'know, I've kind of gone on record as saying that this was the world's longest callback.

=== Characterization ===
Despite the character's death at the end of Avatar, Cameron confirmed in 2010 that Lang would return in the film's sequels, stating, "I'm not going to say exactly how we're bringing him back, but it's a science fiction story, after all. His character will evolve into really unexpected places across the arc of our new three-film saga". In October 2019, Lang revealed that his character was always meant to return in the sequels, stating:

Jim indicated to me years ago, before filming on Avatar was completed, that Quaritch had a future. I might have taken that with a grain of salt at the time because we'd had a few beers. Shortly after Avatar opened, Jim mentioned again that the Colonel was coming back, and by then I knew Jim well enough to know that he means what he says and he says what he means.

Cameron later confirmed that Quaritch would act as the main antagonist across all four sequels. Lang later confirmed that Quaritch would return as a Recombinant, a Na'vi Avatar embedded with the memories of a soldier, which meant that, like the other actors portraying Na'vi characters, Lang's performance in the sequels involved motion capture, which included the new underwater performance capture Cameron developed for the films, which Lang initially found "challenging". Described as "avatars embedded with the memories of human[s]", Quaritch's Recombinant would seek revenge for his human self's death, while seeking to retrieve his son, Miles Quaritch "Spider" Socorro, who was rescued and adopted by Jake and Neytiri after being stranded on Pandora after his father's initial death.

== Appearances ==
=== Films ===
==== Avatar (2009) ====
Miles Quaritch in his human form, as seen in Avatar (2009)

On the moon Pandora, tensions between humans and its indigenous Na'vi had been rising, making it harder for the RDA to mine for unobtanium, a highly valuable mineral used for energy generation which sits under the Omaticaya Clan's Hometree. When paraplegic ex-Marine Jake Sully arrives on Pandora to replace his deceased twin brother Tommy in the Avatar Program, Quaritch offers to pay for his reconstructive leg surgery in exchange for information about the Na'vi, the Omaticaya Clan, their Hometree, and the Tree of Souls. But Jake falls in love with a Na'vi named Neytiri, and begins to sympathize with them and their culture. After Quaritch shows him video logs of Jake lamenting the hopelessness of convincing the Na'vi to leave Hometree, along with reports that the Na'vi had begun burning bulldozers and killing RDA troopers, the RDA's Administrator Parker Selfridge comes to the conclusion that the Omaticaya Clan are a threat to their operation and could not be convinced to leave their Hometree, orders the destruction of the Omaticaya's Hometree, but gives Jake and Dr. Grace Augustine one hour to convince the Na'vi to evacuate Hometree before commencing the attack.

The Na'vi refuse to listen, and after the hour is up, Quaritch and his men destroy Hometree, killing multiple Na'vi. He also unlinks Jake and Grace from their avatars and imprisons them. Disgusted by Quaritch's brutality, pilot Trudy Chacon returns to base and frees Jake and Grace, airlifting them out of the base. Quaritch shoots Grace during the escape, but fails to stop them from escaping Hell's Gate. Quaritch then begins an assault on the Tree of Souls, quickly dispatching the bewildered Na'vi until Pandora's wildlife, seemingly at the direction of Eywa herself, attacks RDA's forces en masse. With all escorts either distracted or destroyed, Quaritch pursues Jake in his gunship, but he attacks it, causing it to crash. Quaritch escapes from his gunship in an AMP suit and advances to the Tree of Souls. Neytiri arrives on a Thanator to protect the Tree, but Quaritch stabs the thanator with his AMP suit's knife, trapping Neytiri beneath it. Jake arrives and fights Quaritch, but he finds and breaks open the module containing Jake's human body, exposing it to Pandora's poisonous atmosphere, interrupting Jake's link with his Avatar. Quaritch then attempts to slit Jake's throat, but Neytiri shoots two arrows into his body, killing him.

==== Avatar: The Way of Water (2022) ====
More than a decade later, the RDA return to Pandora, erecting a new main operating base named Bridgehead City to prepare Pandora for colonization. The RDA transfers the consciousness of Quaritch and other deceased RDA soldiers into Na'vi Avatars called Recombinants as they watch their pre-recorded messages to themselves. After Jake initiates a guerilla campaign against the RDA supply lines, Quaritch and his recombinants capture his children. Jake and Neytiri arrive and free most of them, but Spider is taken by Quaritch. He recognizes Spider as Miles Quaritch Socorro who was born on Pandora and was unable to be transported to Earth due to his young age. Quaritch spends time with Spider in order to draw him to the RDA's side and Spider teaches him more about the Na'vi. Aware of the danger Spider's knowledge of his whereabouts poses to their safety, Jake and his family exile themselves from the Omaticaya and join the Metkayina reef people clan at Pandora's oceans to hide from the RDA. When Jake's adoptive daughter Kiri suffers a violent seizure after trying to link with the Metkayina's Spirit Tree, Jake calls Norm Spellman and Max Patel for help, which allows the RDA to track them down. Quaritch brings Spider with him and commandeers a whaling vessel and orders them to kill tulkuns to draw Jake and the Metkayina out.

Learning of the tulkun killings, Jake's younger son Lo'ak takes off with his siblings to warn Payakan, an outcast tulkun being chased by the whalers. Quaritch captures Lo'ak, along with Jake's daughter Tuk, and Tsireya, the daughter of the Metkayina's chief, Tonowari, and aggressively demands Jake to surrender in exchange for their safe return, but Payakan attacks the whalers, triggering a fight that kills most of the crew and damages the vessel, causing it to sink. Jake's elder son Neteyam rescues Lo'ak, Tsireya and Spider, but is fatally shot. Jake faces Quaritch, who uses Kiri as a hostage, but desists when Neytiri does the same with Spider. Jake strangles Quaritch into unconsciousness and escapes the sinking vessel with his family. Spider rescues Quaritch, but renounces him for his cruelty by hissing at him and rejoins Jake's family as Quaritch leaves on his banshee.

==== Avatar: Fire and Ash (2025) ====
Quaritch continues to hunt Jake and his family, but the two men reluctantly work together when Spider and Jake's kids disappear in the wake of a Mangkwan attack on the Windtraders. In a rare moment of peace between the two men, Jake attempts to get Quaritch to consider following a different path, reminding him that the human Miles Quaritch is dead and the Recombiant is a separate being with his memories.

Having learned that Spider is now capable of breathing Pandoran air, Quaritch seeks him for the RDA, forming an alliance with the Mangkwan leader Varang and later mating with her. With the Mangkwan's help, Quaritch captures Spider once again and corners Jake who agrees to surrender once Quaritch gives Jake his word that he will leave the Metkayina alone. At Bridgehead, Quaritch informs Jake that he will be executed by firing squad and reveals that his animosity for Jake comes from Jake's betrayal and the men and women under Quaritch's command who died as a result of that. Quaritch again tries to bond with his son, but Spider wants nothing more to do with him, eventually using Quaritch's dog tags to engineer his escape before leaving them lying on the floor of his cell. Before he can be executed, Jake is rescued by Neytiri and Dr. Ian Garvin, escaping with Spider. While Quaritch and Parker Selfridge order the RDA not to fire on Spider, they are both overruled by General Ardmore.

Increasingly concerned that Quaritch has become compromised, Ardmore benches the colonel permanently. However, Quaritch arrives with the Mangkwan as the Na'vi are fighting to stop the RDA from hunting the tulkun. The arrival of Quaritch's forces turns things in the RDA's favor and he captures Neytiri and Jake's daughter Tuk, demanding his surrender. When Spider offers himself in exchange, Quaritch releases Jake's family and flees as Ardmore's ship is destroyed by Toruk, killing the general. Quaritch is engaged by Jake in midair, leaving them fighting on some floating rocks with Spider helping Jake against his father. However, when Spider loses his footing and falls, Jake and Quaritch work together to save him. Rather than allowing his family to kill Quaritch, Jake once again implores the colonel to take a new path, which Quaritch considers, before leaping down to the flame-engulfed ocean as Neytiri aims her bow at him.

=== Video games ===
==== Avatar: The Game (2009) ====
Lang reprises his role as Quaritch in the game, which is set two years before the events of Avatar. If the player chooses to side with the RDA, Quaritch will appear at the end, taking over the operation from the Central Command in Plains of Goliath from Commander Karl Falco. He will then give Able Ryder a Dragon Ship to go to Tantalus for some charges to blow up a stone wall to access the Well of Souls, where Ryder will find Falco. After killing Falco and activating the Emulator which cuts off the Na'vi's connection with Eywa, Quaritch congratulates Ryder and orders them to return to base.

==== Avatar: Frontiers of Pandora (2023) ====
After the From the Ashes DLC is completed, Quaritch is seemingly alive following his skirmish with Sully. He contacts Major Bukowski and says, "Major Bukowski... a little banshee told me we're down four of Varang's heavy hitters. (Sir) Yeah. Take a breath, Major. Things are far from optimal all around. I need you back at Bridgehead. Pack your trash and get out of there, zero dark early. (Are we withdrawing from the Western Frontier, sir?) Hell no. You'll keep running things remotely. Maintain pressure and let those insurgents simmer. It's time we regroup and reassess. Remember, Major. We improvise, adapt, and we overcome. Quaritch out."

=== Comics ===
==== Avatar: The Next Shadow (2021) ====
An illusionary Quaritch briefly appears in a nightmare Jake has while in a coma, tormenting him alongside the deceased Tsu'tey.

== Merchandise ==
Mattel made an action figure of Quaritch as part of their range of Avatar action figures. Lego has produced Minifigures of Quaritch for its Lego Avatar theme based on the first two films, his human form comes in set 75571 Neytiri & Thanator vs. AMP Suit Quaritch, and his Recombinant form comes in set 75577 Mako Submarine.

== Reception ==
=== Critical response ===
Writing for Reelviews, James Berardinelli praised Lang's performance in the first film, writing, "Quartich is never CGI animated but he always seems bigger than life. If there's a human star of Avatar, it's Lang.". Similarly, Chris Hewitt, writing for Empire, described Lang's performance as "excellent" and claimed the character was "a scenery-chewing bad guy so badass that he can breathe the Pandoran air without a mask." Elsewhere, A. O. Scott and Manohla Dargis of The New York Times both singled out Lang's performance in the original film as one of the five best male supporting performances of 2009.

Conversely, Kenneth Turan of the Los Angeles Times criticized the "flat dialogue" and "obvious characterization" of Quaritch and the other antagonists in the first film. Russell D. Moore of The Christian Post concluded that "propaganda exists in the film" and stated "If you can get a theater full of people in Kentucky to stand and applaud the defeat of their country [as represented by Quaritch and his men] in war, then you've got some amazing special effects."

=== Accolades ===
Lang's performance as Quaritch in the first film received nominations for Best Villain and Best Fight (with Sam Worthington) at the 2010 Teen Choice Awards and the 2010 MTV Movie Awards, (Note: Attributed to multiple references:) he won Best Supporting Actor at the 36th Saturn Awards. For his motion capture performance in Avatar: The Way of Water, Lang was nominated for Best Voice Acting/Animated/Digital Performance at the Austin Film Critics Association Awards 2022.
