= Suli =

Suli or Sulli can refer to:

- Souli, region in Epirus, Greece, and home of the Souliotes
- Abu Bakr bin Yahya al-Suli (c. 880 – 946), poet and scholar at the Abbasid court
- Suliformes, proposed order of seabirds
- Suli Lake in China
- Suli (1978 film), 1978 Indian film
- Suli (2016 film), 2016 Indian film
- János Süli (born 1956), Hungarian engineer, businessman and politician
- Moses Suli, rugby league footballer
- The Suli, a fictional nomadic group from Leigh Bardugo's Grishaverse novels.
- Suli or Korravai, a Hindu goddess in India, form of Durga

== See also ==
- Sulli (disambiguation)
