= Sulli (disambiguation) =

Sulli (1994–2019) was a South Korean singer, songwriter, actress and model.

Sulli may also refer to:

- Giorgio M. Sulli (1864–1918), Italian-born American voice teacher, conductor, and composer.
- Massimo Sulli (born 1963), Italian judoka
- Serena Sulli, a fictional character in the British children's series Grange Hill
- Sulli Deals, cyber-stalking website in India

== See also ==
- Suli (disambiguation)
- Sully (disambiguation)
