= Jake Sully =

Avatar franchise character

- Avatar character
- Jake Sully in his Na'vi form in a promotional image for Avatar
- First appearance: Avatar (2009)
- Created by: James Cameron
- Portrayed by: Sam Worthington

In-universe information
- Species: Na'vi (via consciousness transfer); Human (originally)
- Gender: Male
- Titles: Corporal; Toruk Makto
- Occupation: Clan leader
- Affiliation: U.S. Marine Corps; RDA; Omatikaya clan; Metkayina clan
- Family: Tom Sully (twin brother)
- Spouse: Neytiri
- Children: Neteyam (son); Lo'ak (son); Tuktirey (daughter); Kiri (adopted daughter); Miles "Spider" Socorro (adopted son)

Jake Sully is a fictional character and the main protagonist of the Avatar film franchise created by James Cameron. He is portrayed by Sam Worthington in Avatar (2009) and its sequels Avatar: The Way of Water (2022), and Avatar: Fire and Ash (2025).

Born a human on Earth, Jake was discharged from the United States Marine Corps after an injury left him paralyzed from the waist down. After his identical twin brother dies, Jake agrees to replace him in the Avatar Program on Pandora, a moon where the Resources Development Administration is mining a valuable mineral. After learning how to remotely operate a Na'vi avatar, Jake grows sympathetic to the Na'vi and turns against the RDA. After driving the humans off Pandora, Jake starts a family with his wife Neytiri. Eventually, the humans return and Jake must fight them again.

== Production history ==
=== Casting ===
Chris Evans, Chris Pine, Chris Pratt and Channing Tatum were considered for the role of Jake Sully. Matt Damon was a candidate, but the production schedule of Avatar conflicted with his work on The Bourne Ultimatum (2007). 20th Century Fox pushed for Jake Gyllenhaal to play the part, but Gyllenhaal was focused on Prince of Persia: The Sands of Time (2010). (Note: Attributed to multiple references:) Sam Worthington, at the time a relatively unknown actor, became frustrated after several secretive auditions—he was not told what the film was about or who was directing. He had an angry outburst, which caught the attention of Cameron, who was seeking an actor with a certain amount of "grit". Once Cameron had narrowed down the list of candidates to Evans, Tatum and Worthington, he compared how each actor read Jake's rallying speech to the Na'vi near the end of the film, and he felt Worthington's performance was the best. Cameron said that Worthington had two contradictory but necessary qualities for the role—toughness and vulnerability. In addition to playing Jake, Worthington briefly appears as Jake's deceased identical twin, Dr. Tom "Tommy" Sully. When he was cast in Avatar, Worthington also signed on for potential sequels. (Note: Attributed to multiple references:)

== Appearances ==
=== Films ===
==== Avatar (2009) ====
In the 22nd century, Jake Sully was discharged from the United States Marine Corps after suffering a spinal injury that left him paralyzed from the waist down. After the death of Jake's twin brother Tom, the Resources Development Administration (RDA) offers Jake the opportunity to take his brother's place in the Avatar Program on the moon Pandora, where humans are mining a valuable mineral called unobtanium. Jake would learn to remotely operate an avatar—a hybrid body grown from both human DNA and the DNA of the Na'vi, the indigenous people of Pandora. The avatars are part of a plan to remove the Na'vi from the area so the RDA can access a rich vein of unobtanium.

Dr. Grace Augustine, the head of the Avatar Program, considers Jake an inadequate replacement for Tom but accepts him into the program. While piloting his avatar and escorting Grace and Dr. Norm Spellman through the Pandoran jungle, Jake is attacked by a thanator. He is rescued by Neytiri, a female Na'vi, who takes him to her clan after witnessing an auspicious sign. Mo'at, Neytiri's mother and the clan's spiritual leader, orders Neytiri to initiate Jake into their society. Jake agrees to give information that he gains while learning the Na'vi ways to Colonel Miles Quaritch, the head of the RDA's security force, in exchange for spinal surgery that will allow him to walk again.

Over the next three months, Jake falls in love with Neytiri and begins sympathizing with the Na'vi. He reveals his change of allegiance when he attempts to disable a bulldozer that is threatening to destroy a sacred Na'vi site. RDA Administrator Parker Selfridge orders Quaritch to destroy the Na'vi clan's Hometree, but Jake asks for one hour to convince the Na'vi to evacuate.

Jake confesses to the Na'vi that he was a spy, and they take him and Grace captive as Quaritch's forces destroy Hometree. In the midst of the chaos, Mo'at frees Jake and Grace, who are then disconnected from their avatars and imprisoned by the RDA. Disgusted by Quaritch's brutality, pilot Trudy Chacón frees Jake, Grace, and Norm and airlifts them to Grace's outpost, although Grace is shot by Quaritch during the escape.

To regain the Na'vi's trust, Jake connects his mind to Toruk, a dragon-like predator who is feared and honored by the Na'vi. Jake pleads with Mo'at to heal Grace and transfer her human body into her avatar with the aid of the Tree of Souls, but Grace dies before the process can be completed. Jake rallies Neytiri's clan and other Na'vi clans to fight the RDA. During the ensuing battle, the Na'vi suffer heavy casualties, but the tide turns when Pandoran wildlife unexpectedly join the attack and overwhelm the humans.

Piloting an AMP suit, Quaritch finds and breaks open the avatar link unit containing Jake's human body, exposing it to Pandora's toxic atmosphere. However, Neytiri kills Quaritch and saves Jake from suffocation. With the exception of Jake, Norm and a few other scientists, all the humans are expelled from Pandora and sent back to Earth. Jake is permanently transferred into his avatar with the aid of the Tree of Souls.

==== Avatar: The Way of Water (2022) ====
Fifteen years after the Na'vi expelled the humans from Pandora, Jake is chief of the Omaticaya clan and has raised a family with Neytiri, including sons Neteyam and Lo'ak, daughter Tuktirey ("Tuk"), adopted daughter Kiri (who was born from Grace Augustine's inert avatar) and adopted son Miles "Spider" Socorro, the human son of Quaritch. The RDA return to Pandora, preparing for colonization and bringing "recombinants"—Na'vi avatars implanted with the memories of dead soldiers. One of the recombinants is a reborn Quaritch.

Jake fights a guerilla war against the RDA, but Quaritch captures his children. Jake and Neytiri manage to free all of them except Spider, who is recognized by Quaritch. Knowing Spider could lead the RDA to their clan, Jake and his family exile themselves and seek asylum with the Metkayina reef clan. Quaritch and the RDA begin hunting whale-like creatures called Tulkun, who share a sacred bond with the Metkayina, in an attempt to draw Jake out of hiding.

Lo'ak and Tuk are captured by Quaritch, which prompts Jake, Neytiri, and the Metkayina to confront him. Jake plans to surrender himself, but a Tulkun named Payakan attacks the RDA, triggering a fight that kills most of the humans and causes the whaling ship to begin sinking. After Neteyam is fatally shot, Jake faces Quaritch, who takes Kiri hostage. However, Quaritch releases her when Neytiri threatens to kill Spider. Jake strangles Quaritch into unconsciousness, then is rescued from the sinking ship by Lo'ak. Spider saves Quaritch, then rejoins Jake's family. After Neteyam's funeral, the Metkayina chief Tonowari declares that Jake and his family are now Metkayina. While connecting with the Metkayina spirit tree, Jake decides he will stand and fight the RDA instead of continuing to run.

==== Avatar: Fire and Ash (2025) ====
Mourning the loss of his son, Jake finds himself at odds with Lo'ak and Neytiri, blaming Lo'ak for Neteyam's death while Neytiri's hatred of humans in her grief increasingly alienates her from Jake. Tonowari urges Jake to take up the mantle of Toruk Makto once more, but Jake refuses.

While taking Spider back to the High Camp on a fleet of merchant airships, they come under attack by the vicious Mangkwan Clan, causing Jake to become separated from his family. With a mutual interest in ensuring Spider's survival, Jake and Quaritch reluctantly work together to find the kids, learning in the process that thanks to Kiri, Spider is now capable of breathing Pandoran air. Despite the animosity between them, Jake repeatedly attempts to get Quaritch to leave behind his human past and embrace the Na'vi way of life as Jake did.

Jake subsequently has Norm and Max examine Spider to discover how he is now capable of breathing Pandoran air and worries that the RDA will be able to replicate it if they capture him. On the urging of Mo'at, Jake and Neytiri finally reveal to Kiri the truth of her origins: she is genetically a clone of Grace's avatar, created from a "seed" planted by Eywa during the failed attempt to transfer Grace into her avatar.

With the help of the Mangkwan, Quaritch later attacks the Metkayina village in order to capture Jake and Spider. After Quaritch agrees to spare the Metkayina, Jake agrees to surrender and is sentenced to execution by firing squad. However, he is broken out by Dr. Ian Garvin, an RDA scientist who disagrees with the RDA's plans to slaughter the tulkun. Spider risks his life to save Jake, which is witnessed by Neytiri as she rescues them. Jake decides to kill Spider in order to keep him out of the RDA's hands, but can't bring himself to do it. Instead, Jake and Neytiri fully embrace Spider as their son.

Seeing no other way, Jake becomes Toruk Makto once more to rally the clans against the RDA. Lo'ak and Payakan are able to convince the tulkun to fight when even Jake can't. At first, Jake and his forces decimate the RDA, but the arrival of Quaritch and the Mangkwan armed with human weapons turns the battle against the Na'vi with Jake falling from Toruk and Neytiri and Tuk being captured. Reconciling with Lo'ak, Jake boards the RDA ship to rescue his family while Kiri convinces Eywa to send the Pandoran wildlife to help. As Jake fights Quaritch on some floating rocks with Spider's help, the RDA forces fall to the wildlife. Toruk destroys General Ardmore's ship, killing the RDA commander. Jake and Quaritch's fight is interrupted by Spider nearly falling to his death, forcing the two to work together to save Spider. Rather than allowing his family to kill Quaritch, Jake again implores him to take a different path, but Quaritch jumps into the inferno below.

Jake, his family, the Metkayina and the tulkun later link together with the Spirit Tree.

=== Comics ===
==== Avatar: The Next Shadow (2021) ====
Shortly after the events of the Avatar, Jake has the Na'vi give his human body a traditional burial and moves the Omaticaya Clan near Hell's Gate to be close to the human allies who were allowed to stay on Pandora. Two weeks later, Jake still visits his former body's burial site, envisioning himself as a human. Neytiri informs him she must go help the Olangi Clan, who had suffered the most casualties from the war. Jake, thinking about how the other clan's belief in him is getting shaky, agrees with her and sees her off.

Jake confides in Mo'at his lack of self-confidence as clan leader and the guilt he faces for the destruction of Hometree. Mo'at assures Jake that he is stronger than he thinks, and that their new home and him becoming Toruk Makto was Eywa's will. Tsu'tey's parents, Artsut and Ateyo, arrive with their other son, Arvok, who challenges Jake's position as Olo'eyktan by invoking First Blood. Jake agrees to fight Arvok despite Mo'at warning that the ritual is dangerous. Jake easily defeats Arvok by cutting his arm and drawing blood. Angry about his loss, Arvok throws his knife at Jake, who catches it, but gets poisoned and collapses into a coma.

In his coma, Jake has nightmares where he is tormented by the deceased Miles Quaritch and Tsu'tey, until he unintentionally makes tsaheylu with the Tree of Souls and is transported into the Pandoran Neural Network. The manifested spirits of Eytukan and Tsu'tey urge him to forgive himself for his mistakes and offer guidance. Tsu'tey reveals Artsut and Ateyo's plan to Jake, explaining that although their actions were wrong, they had the interests of the Omaticaya at heart. Jake decides that he will punish them for their wrongdoings, while also being merciful towards them in doing so.

Awaking from his coma, Jake exiles Artsut and Ateyo for their assassination attempt. After they leave, he gathers the Omaticaya, promising to do his best and lead them to a better future. Neytiri returns and finds Jake at the gravesite. Neytiri comments that he doesn't seem like himself, but Jake reassures her that he has never felt more like himself and leaves his human body behind.

==== Avatar: The High Ground (2022) ====
Years after the events of Avatar, Jake and Neytiri have settled and have created a family, and are trying to keep peace in their family, but Jake still worries that the humans will return while everyone else believes he is just paranoid, and believe that Eywa chased the humans away the first time, and she will do the same this time around.

== Merchandise ==
Mattel made action figures of Jake Sully as part of their range of Avatar action figures. The variants included: Avatar Jake Sully, Avatar Jake Sully (Clothes) and Avatar Jake Sully (Warrior). He was also included in a range of Avatar toys produced for McDonald's Happy Meals. In 2022, McFarlane Toys began releasing toys based on the Avatar franchise, among them include a Jake Sully action figure, an action figure of Jake riding his banshee, a set of Jake fighting the thanator, and a set of Jake in the Omatikaya rainforest. They will be releasing an additional three toys to coincide with the release of Avatar: The Way of Water. Further, in November 2022, Funko announced they would be releasing two Pop! Vinyl toys based on Jake Sully, one which shows him in his basic avatar body and the other of him as Toruk Makto. Lego has produced Minifigures of Jake Sully for its Lego Avatar theme. Of the ten sets released so far, Sully appears in 4 of them, with 5 minifigures representing his human form and his Avatar's various looks throughout both films. Lego has also made two BrickHeadz depicting his human and Avatar forms.

== Reception ==
For his performance in Avatar, Worthington won the Saturn Award for Best Actor for his performance as Sully at the 36th Saturn Awards. He was subsequently nominated a second time for his performance in Avatar: The Way of Water at the 51st Saturn Awards.

In 2022, Worthington was nominated for the Washington D.C. Area Film Critics Association award for Best Motion Capture Performance for his performance in The Way of Water. However, the award ultimately ended up going to his co-star Zoe Saldaña.
