= Sully (surname) =

Sully is a surname, and may refer to:

- Alfred Sully (1820–1879), American military officer
- Anthony Sully (1944–2023), American serial killer
- Brian Sully (1936–2019), Australian judge law professor
- Damien Sully (born 1974), Australian rules football field umpire
- Daniel Sully (1855–1910), American circus performer, stage actor and playwright
- David John Sully (born 1947), Welsh chess player
- Eugene Sully (born 1977), runner-up in Big Brother Series 6, UK
- François Sully (1927/28–1971), French journalist and photographer
- Frank Sully (1908–1975), American film actor
- Haydn Sully (1939–2006), English cricketer
- Henry Sully (1680–1729), English clockmaker
- Ivory Sully (born 1957), American football player
- Jack Sully (c.1850–1904), American cattle rustler, outlaw and sheriff born Arthur McDonald
- James Sully (1842–1923), English psychologist
- Jeanne Sully (1905–1995), French actress
- John Sully (c.1283–c.1388), English knight
- Kathleen Sully (1910–2001), English novelist
- Margaretta Sully West (d. 1810), American theater manager and stage actor
- Mariette Sully (1878–1950), Belgian soprano
- Mary Sully (1896–1963), Yankton Dakota avant-garde artist
- Robert Matthew Sully (1803–1855), American portrait painter
- Rosalie Sully (1818–1847), American painter
- Royston Sully (born 1985), English cricketer
- Sandra Sully (born c. 1962), Australian journalist
- Sandra Sully (songwriter) (fl. 2006), member of The Love Machine and songwriter
- Thomas Sully (1783–1872), English-born American painter
- Thomas Sully (architect) (1855–1939), American architect
- Walter Sully (1895–1970), Australian cinematographer and newsreel cameraman

== See also ==
- Sully Sullenberger (born 1951), American pilot
