= Sully, West Virginia =

Unincorporated community in West Virginia, US

Coordinates: 38°57′25″N 79°34′22″W

Sully is an unincorporated community in Randolph County, in the U.S. state of West Virginia.

== History ==
A post office called Sully was established in 1906, and remained in operation until 1953. The building was also a small general store and still stands today, known as the Thomas Carr house.

There was also a one room school house that sat behind the Panther Camp United Methodist Church. The school house burned down in the early 1980’s.

The Panther Camp United Methodist Church was built in 1919 on land donated from the Chisholm family. Granville Good and Dillon Thompson were the main builders of the church, along with family members of the Chilsholm, Carr, and Kerns families. In the early 1950’s, it was decided to dig a basement under the church, Dillon Thompson donated all the block and material and he and Granville Good commenced to hand tunneling and digging the basement and laying the foundation. Granville suffered a heart attack and died, and the job was never completed. Today, only a half basement still sits beneath the church.

Sully consisted of the Thompson, Chisholm, Hawkinberry, Kerns, and Carr families at the turn of the century. Just a few miles up the road from the church is the Kerns Cemetery, where many of the community's early members are buried.

As of 2026, only about 24 people still call Sully home, and it contains about 18 dwellings and 9 storage buildings or barns, and 1 church. It is all farm land now.

The origin of the name Sully is obscure.
