= Sully Creek (South Dakota) =

Stream in South Dakota, U.S.

Coordinates: 44°35′30″N 100°35′48″W

Sully Creek is a stream in the U.S. state of South Dakota.

Sully Creek took its name from nearby Fort Sully.

== See also ==
- List of rivers of South Dakota
