= RDA (Avatar) =

Fictional company in the Avatar movie universe

Resources Development Administration
- Type: Public company
- Headquarters: Earth
- Location: Pandora
- Products: Unobtanium, advanced military hardware, maglev transit systems
- Services: Resource extraction, military enforcement, and corporate colonialism
- Methods: Colonial expansion, resource extraction, military force, corporate diplomacy
- Corporate Administrator: Parker Selfridge
- Security Chief: Miles Quaritch

The Resources Development Administration (RDA) is a fictional organization that first appears in Avatar, the 2009 science fiction film written and directed by James Cameron. It is depicted as a powerful corporate entity seeking unobtainium, a valuable mineral, to sustain its operations. To this end, the RDA establishes a colony on the extrasolar moon Pandora, where it employs both scientific and military means to extract resources, often clashing with the indigenous Na'vi population.

James Cameron and various critics have drawn comparisons between the RDA and real-world entities to highlight the corporation's role as a critique of environmental degradation, imperialism, and corporate overreach. Cameron likened the RDA's exploitation of Pandora to BP's actions in the Deepwater Horizon oil spill, while others have compared it to companies like Chevron Corporation, Shell Oil Company, and ExxonMobil, emphasizing parallels in destructive resource extraction practices and disregard for environmental or human consequences. Additionally, the militarized SecOps arm of the RDA has been compared to private military companies like Blackwater, noted for their use of ex-military personnel and ethically questionable tactics, with the RDA's militarism also echoing historical and contemporary U.S. military strategies. Through these comparisons, the RDA is framed as a dystopian representation of unchecked corporate power intertwined with militarism and environmental exploitation.

== Fictional appearance ==
For Avatar, filmmakers compiled an encyclopedia for the film called the Pandorapedia to describe its fictional elements. The in-universe encyclopedia describes the RDA as "the largest single non-governmental organization in the human universe". In the fictional universe, prior to the events in the film, the RDA constructs on Earth a global rapid transit system using the maglev transport method to commute people around the world for work. The RDA requires more resources to run the system and seeks unobtainium to this end. The organization launches a space expedition to the extrasolar moon Pandora to mine for unobtainium.

The RDA contracts a private military company called SecOps. The organization initially dispatches scientists to convince the Na'vi to give up their land for mining, but when this fails, it deploys SecOps to use military action to take the land.

In the film, RDA has a colony on Pandora called Resources Development Administration Extra-Solar Colony 01. It is nicknamed Hell's Gate. Cynthia Erb, writing in Journal of Film and Video, describes Hell's Gate as a "gray, metallic, depressive world" with emphasis on strip mining and de-emphasis on nature, with the only visible green being the artificial turf used by RDA's CEO Parker Selfridge for putting in golf. Kyla Schuller, writing in Discourse, said the RDA's compound had a "muted gray military-bureaucratic palate" that was in sharp contrast with "the verdant hues of blue and green" landscape of Pandora.

In the 2022 sequel film Avatar: The Way of Water, the RDA establishes a new installation on Pandora called Bridgehead, described as significantly larger and more advanced than Hell's Gate. Comparable in size and function to a terrestrial city, such as Long Beach, California, Bridgehead serves as a hub for human colonization efforts on Pandora. Overseen by a newly formed administrative division, RDA CON-DEV, this sprawling facility manages the complex land-development processes for Bridgehead and other installations. Built by numerous subcontractors drawn by lucrative contracts, the settlement represents a pivotal step in the RDA's long-term plans for Pandora, embodying its motto, "Building Tomorrow."

== Company comparisons ==
James Cameron compared RDA to BP, saying BP's Deepwater Horizon oil spill in 2010 was symptomatic of corporate greed, like how RDA's greed led it to pillage Pandora. Critics of mining plans for the Athabasca oil sands in Alberta, Canada compared the involved companies BP, Shell Oil Company, and ExxonMobil to the RDA.

Rebecca Tarbotton, the acting executive director of the Rainforest Action Network, compared RDA to Chevron Corporation. Like Chevron founded the boomtown of Lago Agrio in Ecuador in the 1960s, RDA in Avatar establishes an extraction base on Pandora. Tarbotton said, "Both corporations proceeded to drill like there was no tomorrow with no regard for the health of the environment or the communities... Both RDA Corporation and Chevron refuse to acknowledge basic human rights and use cut-and-run operations that leave communities devastated."

== Military comparisons ==
SecOps, the private military company under the RDA, has been compared to Blackwater, the private firm that was used in the Iraq War starting in 2003. Both firms consist of ex-military personnel who engage in killing non-combatants; Blackwater employees were convicted of shooting Iraqi civilians in 2007. The RDA's military base, Hell's Gate, is similar to the Green Zone, a fortified base in Baghdad during the Iraq War, as well as fortified bases in Vietnam during the Vietnam War.

Dominic Alessio and Kristen Meredith, writing in Journal of Colonialism and Colonial History, said, "In Cameron's vision the RDA, like the American government, is keen to preserve a certain self-image," both readily deciding to engage militarily. Alessio and Meredith compare the RDA's attack on the Hometree of the Na'vi to the September 11 attacks, "Cameron’s visual analogy implies that American civilians have been the innocent victims of such attacks also and should sympathise with such atrocities."

== Representation of colonialism ==
Tanner Mirrlees, in Global Entertainment Media: Between Cultural Imperialism and Cultural Globalization, says RDA represents "the colonial self" with the Na'vi as "the colonized other", a dichotomy seen through "the lens of Orientalist stereotypes". Mirrlees said, "In Avatar, the colonial self is portrayed as active, technological, modern, forward-looking, and rational, while the colonized other is depicted as passive, naturalistic, traditional, backwards, and spiritual." Tim Nieguth, writing in The Politics of Popular Culture: Negotiating Power, Identity, and Place, said some commentators said the film was a critique of colonialism, "They point out that Avatar portrays RDA and some of its key personnel as self-interested, violent, and ecologically destructive, while painting Na'vi society as community-minded, peaceful, and attuned to its natural environment." Nieguth said other commentators disagreed and found the film to have a regressive message with the Na'vi depending on the protagonist as a white savior to defeat "the forces of colonialism" represented by the RDA.

== Corporate monstrosity ==
The book Masculinity and Monstrosity in Contemporary Hollywood Films defines the Resources Development Administration (RDA) as the central antagonist in Avatar, embodying the destructive force of corporate and neoliberal expansionism. The text positions the RDA not simply as a company, but as a cultural and ideological machine—a "cultural Artificial Intelligence"—driving imperialistic and patriarchal domination. Its representatives, Parker Selfridge and Colonel Quaritch, serve as archetypes of corporate complicity and psychopathy. Selfridge, the profit-driven executive, exemplifies the banal cruelty of corporate systems that prioritize shareholder returns over ethical considerations. His justifications for displacing the Na'vi from Hometree, cloaked in the language of corporate necessity, reveal the moral detachment inherent in the RDA's ideology. Quaritch, on the other hand, represents the militarized enforcement arm of the corporation, embodying a calculated ruthlessness that ensures RDA's objectives are met through violence and terror.

The RDA's exploitation of Pandora and its indigenous population is framed as a continuation of historical colonial practices, with Pandora presented as the ultimate "Indian Country". The corporation's drive for unobtanium parallels real-world resource extraction that disregards environmental and cultural impacts. Selfridge's and Quaritch's partnership exemplifies the marriage of corporatism and militarism, where economic desperation, as seen in Jake's initial mercenary role, feeds into a system that commodifies individuals. The text also highlights the dehumanizing nature of the RDA's actions, as its bureaucratic structure and imperialistic methods strip the Na’vi of their status as beings, reducing them to obstacles to be removed. Ultimately, the RDA's portrayal as a monstrous, self-perpetuating entity critiques neoliberal ideologies and emphasizes the dystopian potential of unchecked corporate power.

== Criticism of RDA's use of force ==
Joseph J. Foy, writing about Avatar and just war theory, critiques the RDA's use of force against the Na'vi, particularly the Omaticaya clan, in terms of jus ad bellum (justice in the decision to go to war) and jus in bello (justice in wartime conduct). The corporation's initial attack on Hometree is motivated solely by profit, aiming to exploit the unobtanium beneath it. This fails to meet the principle of just cause, as profit is not a morally acceptable reason for war. The justification offered by Colonel Quaritch, claiming the conflict is a preemptive defense against a Na'vi threat, is disingenuous; the Na'vi are resisting the RDA's aggression. Furthermore, the RDA, a private corporation without legitimate governmental authority, lacks the legal and moral standing to declare or initiate war. Its token diplomatic gestures, including a one-hour negotiation window, are superficial attempts to legitimize pre-planned violence rather than sincere efforts at peaceful resolution.

The RDA's methods also violates jus in bello principles of discrimination and proportionality. Its attacks target not only combatants but also civilians, treating the entire Omaticaya population as enemies. By destroying Hometree and later targeting the Tree of Souls, the RDA disregards the principle of sparing noncombatants, committing acts of cultural and civilian destruction integral to their strategy. Quaritch's use of excessive and disproportionate force, including advanced weaponry against minimally armed Na'vi and the planned obliteration of the Tree of Souls, further underscores this injustice. His rhetoric of "fighting terror with terror" and intention to annihilate Na'vi cultural foundations demonstrate a willful violation of proportionality, transforming the conflict into a one-sided massacre. The RDA's actions reflect a disregard for both moral and legal wartime principles, highlighting the corporation's prioritization of profit over ethical conduct.

== RDA's lack of business ethics ==
Matthew Brophy, writing about RDA's business ethics, calls the RDA a representation of unbridled corporate greed, emphasizing profit maximization at any cost. As Parker Selfridge, the corporate administrator, puts it, shareholders prioritize financial returns over moral or ethical considerations. Guided by a fiduciary duty to increase shareholder value, the RDA pursues the extraction of unobtanium, an invaluable mineral, leading to the destruction of the Na'vi's sacred Hometree. This pursuit violates ethical norms, such as entitlement theory, which asserts that property rights cannot be overridden by force, deception, or fraud. The Na'vi's connection to Hometree, deeply rooted in culture, labor, and tradition, qualifies as de facto property rights, making the RDA's actions morally and ethically reprehensible.

Brophy likens RDA's corporate strategy to competitive sports or games, where aggression and self-interest are acceptable, but notes significant differences. Unlike consensual competition, the Na'vi are unwilling and disadvantaged participants in the RDA's quest for profit. While Milton Friedman's shareholder theory defends profit maximization within legal and ethical boundaries, the RDA's actions involve coercion and arguably fraud, bypassing even minimal moral constraints. Moreover, Selfridge's justification—fulfilling corporate directives—echoes psychological phenomena like diffusion of responsibility and obedience to authority, which obscure personal accountability.

Ultimately, Avatar critiques corporate practices that disregard humanity and ethics under the guise of fiduciary obligations. It underscores how moral considerations, like recognizing the natural rights and values of shareholders and stakeholders alike, must temper corporate actions. The RDA's conduct serves as a cautionary tale about the perils of moral obfuscation and the dehumanizing potential of unrestrained corporate ambition.

== Other commentary ==
Dan Dinello, writing about Avatar from a philosophical angle, draws parallels between the fictional Resources Development Administration (RDA) in Avatar and real-world corporations such as British Petroleum (BP) and Halliburton, speculating on their potential operations on an interplanetary scale. The actions of the RDA, including their collaboration with a private military force, reflect patterns of American imperialism and environmental degradation. The portrayal of the RDA's efforts to displace the indigenous Na'vi population for access to natural resources is compared to historical events such as the genocide of Native Americans and the ongoing destruction of the Amazon rainforest. Additionally, the depiction of the RDA's conflict with Na'vi resistance movements is likened to the dynamics of the Vietnam War.

The book The Post-2000 Film Western: Contexts, Transnationality, Hybridity draws a metaphorical comparison between the Resources Development Administration (RDA) in Avatar and the United States Department of the Interior, particularly in its role overseeing federal land management and the Bureau of Indian Affairs (BIA). Within the narrative, the RDA is responsible for Earth's mining and resource development interests on Pandora, overseeing both the military and the scientific Avatar Project. These initiatives also involve acting as intermediaries with the Na'vi, aiming to educate and persuade them to acquiesce to the RDA's mining operations. The military component's role in ensuring the operation's success is noted as a narrative parallel to the historical placement of the BIA within the War Department upon its establishment in 1824.

The RDA, as detailed in The Encyclopedia of Racism in American Films, embodies forces such as white imperialism, capitalism, and militarism.

== Bibliography ==
- Alessio, Dominic; Meredith, Kristen (Fall 2012). "Decolonising James Cameron's Pandora: Imperial history and science fiction". Journal of Colonialism and Colonial History. 13 (2). doi:10.1353/cch.2012.0015.
- Combe, Kirk; Boyle, Brenda (2013). "The New Millennium Manliness". Masculinity and Monstrosity in Contemporary Hollywood Films. Palgrave Macmillan. pp. 217–221. ISBN 978-1-137-35982-7.
- Dunn, George A.; Irwin, William, eds. (2014). Avatar and Philosophy: Learning to See. The Blackwell Philosophy and Pop Culture Series. Wiley-Blackwell. ISBN 978-1-118-88676-2.
  - Dinello, Dan. "'See the World We Come From': Spiritual versus Technological Transcendence in Avatar". In Dunn & Irwin (2014).
  - Foy, Joseph J. "'We Will Fight Terror with Terror': Avatar and Just War Theory". In Dunn & Irwin (2014).
  - Brophy, Matthew. "'All That Cheddar': Lessons in Business Ethics from the RDA Corporation". In Dunn & Irwin (2014).
- Erb, Cynthia (Fall 2014). "A Spiritual Blockbuster: Avatar, Environmentalism, and the New Religions". Journal of Film and Video. 66 (3): 3–17. doi:10.5406/jfilmvideo.66.3.0003.
- Marubbio, M. Elise (2015). "Decolonizing the Western: A Revisionist Analysis of Avatar with a Twist". In Paryz, Marek; Leo, John R. (eds.). The Post-2000 Film Western: Contexts, Transnationality, Hybridity. Palgrave Macmillan. ISBN 978-1-137-53128-5.
- Mirrlees, Tanner (2013). Global Entertainment Media: Between Cultural Imperialism and Cultural Globalization. Routledge. ISBN 978-1-136-33465-8.
- Nieguth, Tim (2015). The Politics of Popular Culture: Negotiating Power, Identity, and Place. McGill-Queen's University Press. ISBN 978-0-7735-9686-3.
- Schuller, Kyla (Spring 2013). "Avatar and the Movements of Neocolonial Sentimental Cinema". Discourse. 35 (2): 177–193. doi:10.13110/discourse.35.2.0177.
