= Lightstorm Entertainment =

American film and television production company

Lightstorm Entertainment, Inc.
- Logo used since 1994
- Type: Private
- Industry: Film; Television
- Predecessor: Tech Noir Productions
- Founded: 1990; 36 years ago
- Founder: James Cameron; Lawrence Kasanoff
- Headquarters: Santa Monica, California, U.S.
- Products: Terminator 2: Judgment Day; True Lies; Titanic; Avatar film series
- Owner: James Cameron
- Divisions: Lightstorm Earth; Lightstorm Vision; Cameron/Eglee Productions; Lightstorm Music; Lightstorm Music Publishing
- Subsidiaries: Earthship Productions

Lightstorm Entertainment, Inc. is an American independent film and television production company founded by filmmaker James Cameron and producer Lawrence Kasanoff in 1990. Cameron previously founded Tech Noir Productions with Gale Anne Hurd, which only made The Abyss in 1989.

The company had signed its overall deal with Carolco Pictures in 1990 for just two years, having only one picture came out of the deal, before jumping ship to 20th Century Fox, who had the US rights, and United International Pictures, via Universal Pictures, in 1992 for foreign film rights for 12 pictures.

Also that year, the company made its expansion plans when it teamed up with Sony Music Entertainment to launch a label, Lightstorm Music, to handle the soundtracks of its movies. In 1993, Lawrence Kasanoff, a founding partner had left the company to start out its own company, Threshold Entertainment. Also that year, the company had signed a deal with Acclaim Entertainment to produce video games based on its film properties.

The company's films include the sci-fi film Terminator 2: Judgment Day (1991), the action-comedy film True Lies (1994), the romantic film Titanic (1997), the epic science fiction film series Avatar, and the sci-fi film Alita: Battle Angel (2019); Cameron has employed other filmmakers to produce and direct films under the Lightstorm banner. Based in Santa Monica, California, the company established a first look deal with 20th Century Fox (currently known as 20th Century Studios) in 1995, who has since distributed a majority of the company's films.

In 1993, Cameron would meet his future Titanic and Avatar co-producer Jon Landau during the production of True Lies, and would persuade Landau to join the company. The company's logo depicts a bowman using a lightning bolt as an arrow.

In 1998, Lightstorm had partnered with Charles Eglee to launch a television production company, Cameron/Eglee Productions, which only made the show Dark Angel under the label.

In January 2015, Lightstorm Entertainment had brought the motion-capture technology assets of Atlanta-based Giant Studios who had handled motion-capture services on Lightstorm's successful film Avatar. This allowed Lightstorm Entertainment its own motion-capture technology production service and had allowed Lightstorm to develop motion-capture production technology in-house for its future films whilst Giant's research and development team continued to develop the motion-capture technology under Lightstorm.

In December 2024, Lightstorm Entertainment announced its entry into the virtual reality business with the establishment of its virtual reality technology 3D entertainment division called Lightstorm Vision to expand Lightstorm's technology production tools in entertainment experiences and had collaborated with multinational technology company Meta Platforms via a multi-year collaboration for Lightstorm's 3D productions. Lightstorm Vision will use Meta Quest as its exclusive MR hardware platform service for Lightstorm's films including Avatar: Fire and Ash (2025) and Billie Eilish – Hit Me Hard and Soft: The Tour (Live in 3D) (2026).

In June 2026, Lightstorm Entertainment's 3D/VR technology entertainment division Lightstorm Vision had acquired German 3D camera & rig production manager and technology developer Stereotec following the massive successful of the live 3D capture production for "Billie Eilish – Hit Me Hard and Soft: The Tour (Live in 3D)", with Stereotec became a subsidiary of Lightstorm Vision and would help expand Lightstorm Vision's capabilities at the capture stage of the 3D production process for its future films.

In September 2026, Lightstorm Entertainment's 3D/VR technology entertainment division Lightstorm Vision had brought AI-driven stereoscopic 3D post-production company that specializes in converting 2D film and television footage into premium 3D and immersive content, Outsyders, the studio delivers stereoscopic pipeline delivered the 3D versions of movies as it's platform being interrogated into Lightstorm Vision's own in-house 3D capture & post-production system studio following the success of the production of "Billie Eilish – Hit Me Hard and Soft: The Tour (Live in 3D)" that Outsyders had worked on it before Lightstorm Vision had brought it, while Outsyders continued to run as a subsidiary within Lightstorm Vision.

== Filmography ==
=== Feature films ===
==== Released ====
Title	Release date	Director	Writer(s)	Distributor	Co-production companies	Budget	Worldwide gross	References
Terminator 2: Judgment Day	July 3, 1991	James Cameron	James Cameron; William Wisher	TriStar Pictures	Carolco Pictures; Pacific Western Productions	$94–102 million	$520.8 million	
The Abyss: Special Edition	February 26, 1993	James Cameron	James Cameron	20th Century Fox	Pacific Western Productions	$43–47 million	$89.8 million	
True Lies	July 15, 1994	James Cameron	screenplay by: James Cameron story by: Randall Frakes; James Cameron	20th Century Fox (United States, Canada, France, and Italy); Universal Pictures (International)	N/A	$100–120 million	$378.9 million	
Strange Days	October 6, 1995	Kathryn Bigelow	screenplay by: James Cameron; Jay Cocks story by: James Cameron	20th Century Fox (United States, Canada, France, and Italy); Universal Pictures (International)	N/A	$42 million	$8 million	
Titanic	December 19, 1997	James Cameron		Paramount Pictures (United States and Canada); 20th Century Fox (International)	N/A	$200 million	$2.256 billion	
Solaris	November 29, 2002	Steven Soderbergh	screenplay by: Steven Soderbergh based on Solaris by: Stainslaw Lem	20th Century Fox	N/A	$47 million	$30 million	
Avatar	December 18, 2009	James Cameron		20th Century Fox	Dune Entertainment; Ingenious Film Partners	$237 million	$2.923 billion	
Alita: Battle Angel	February 14, 2019	Robert Rodriguez	screenplay by: James Cameron; Laeta Kalogridis based on the manga Gunnm by: Yukito Kishiro	20th Century Fox	Troublemaker Studios	$170 million	$404.9 million	
Terminator: Dark Fate	November 1, 2019	Tim Miller	screenplay by: David S. Goyer; Justin Rhodes; Billy Ray story by: James Cameron; Charles H. Eglee; Josh Friedman; David S. Goyer; Justin Rhodes based on characters created by: James Cameron; Gale Anne Hurd	Paramount Pictures (United States and Canada); 20th Century Fox (International)	20th Century Fox; Skydance Media; Tencent Pictures	$185–196 million	$261.1 million	
Avatar: The Way of Water	December 16, 2022	James Cameron	screenplay by: James Cameron; Rick Jaffa & Amanda Silver story by: James Cameron, Rick Jaffa & Amanda Silver, Josh Friedman and Shane Salerno based on characters created by: James Cameron	20th Century Studios	N/A	$350 million	$2.320 billion	
Avatar: Fire and Ash	December 19, 2025	James Cameron	screenplay by: James Cameron, Rick Jaffa and Amanda Silver story by: James Cameron, Rick Jaffa & Amanda Silver, Josh Friedman and Shane Salerno based on characters created by: James Cameron	20th Century Studios	N/A	$350–400 million	$1.485 billion	
Billie Eilish – Hit Me Hard and Soft: The Tour (Live in 3D) (Note: under Lightstorm Earth)	May 8, 2026	James Cameron; Billie Eilish	—N/a	Paramount Pictures	Interscope Films and Darkroom Records	$20 million	$26.7 million	

==== Upcoming ====
Title	Release date	Director	Writer(s)	Distributor	Co-production companies	References
Painter	2026	Garrett Warren	screenplay by Derek Kolstad	20th Century Studios	Infrared Pictures and Circle M + P	
Avatar 4	December 21, 2029	James Cameron	screenplay by: James Cameron; Josh Friedman story by: James Cameron; Josh Friedman; Rick Jaffa & Amanda Silver and Shane Salerno based on characters created by: James Cameron	20th Century Studios	N/A	
Avatar 5	December 19, 2031	James Cameron	screenplay by: James Cameron Shane Salerno story by: James Cameron; Josh Friedman; Rick Jaffa & Amanda Silver; Shane Salerno based on characters created by: James Cameron	20th Century Studios	N/A	

=== Television series ===
Title	First air date	Last air date	Creator	Network	Co-production companies	References
True Lies	March 1, 2023	May 17, 2023	Matt Nix	CBS	20th Television; Anthony Hemingway Productions; Flying Glass of Milk Productions; Wonderland Sound and Vision	
Secrets of the Penguins	April 20, 2025	April 21, 2025	Bertie Gregory	National Geographic	National Geographic Studios; Talesmith	
Fire and Water: Making The Avatar Films	November 7, 2025		Thomas C. Grane	Disney+	20th Century Studios; Mob Scene	
Secrets of the Bees	March 31, 2026		Nadége Laici	National Geographic	National Geographic Studios; Silverback Films	
