= Pandora (Avatar) =

Fictional moon in the Avatar franchise

- Avatar location
- Pandora (foreground) and Polyphemus (background) as seen in Avatar
- First appearance: Avatar (2009)
- Last appearance: Avatar: Fire and Ash (2025)
- Created by: James Cameron
- Genre: Science fiction

In-universe information
- Type: Exomoon; Habitable exoplanet; Natural satellite
- Races: Na'vi; Tulkun; Human
- Locations: Hometree; Tree of Souls; Bridgehead

Pandora is an exomoon within the fictional universe of Avatar, serving as the primary location of the franchise. Slightly smaller than Earth, Pandora is inhabited by native Na'vi and Tulkun, among many other species who call the moon home. Pandora is covered in dense bioluminescent rainforests, oceans and floating mountains. Appearing across different media, it first appeared as the setting of Avatar (2009) and its sequels, along with the video games Avatar: The Game (2009) and Avatar: Frontiers of Pandora (2023), various graphic novels, a stage show and a theme park area. In the film series, Pandora is a source of a large amount of unobtainium, a superconducting rock, present beneath the surface, which humanity from a future Earth attempt to exploit. In later movies, humanity shift their focus to hunting the Tulkun, hosts to amrita, a substance that stops humans aging.

== Description ==
Pandora is a natural satellite of the gas giant Polyphemus, which orbits Alpha Centauri A in the fictional universe of Avatar. Due to the atmospheric composition containing carbon dioxide and hydrogen sulphide, humans are unable to safely breathe on the moon, requiring the use of breathing equipment or avatars. The moon harbours vast natural resources, with untouched ecosystems spanning the surface, lacking all traces of technology. These natural resources include unobtainium, a type of "thundering rock", dubbed "lingtskxe" in Na'vi ("ling" from "floating" and "skxe" for "rock"), and a superconductor that is worth millions per kilogram. This large quantity of unobtainium causes chunks of land to be ripped from the ground, creating magnetically aligned "skyborne icebergs" of rock. The moon has expansive landscapes, the rainforests in particular home to alien cycads, ferns and "zooplantae" (lifeforms that are scientifically placed between plants and animals), such as helicoradian, that respond by physically withdrawing when touched.

Populated by multiple species, the Na'vi, species such as direhorses, thanators and the intelligent Tulkun, and plants all share a larger spiritual connection with Pandora itself, through a god known as Eywa. These connections are described in the movies as being more advanced than the human brain. Known as "The Great Mother", Eywa hosts memories of all beings who live on the moon, including those who have passed on. Using a neural queue (also known as a "kuru") located in their hair, the Na'vi can connect to Eywa at locations of sacred importance, such as the Tree of Souls. There are multiple known Na'vi clans, these consisting of the Anurai, Aranahe, Hulanta, Hyuticaya, Kame'tire, Kekukan, Li'ona, Mangkwan, Metkayina, Ni'awve, Olangi, Omatikaya (Note: Alternative spellings of "Omatikaya" and "Omaticaya" are given dependent on source. The spelling given by Avatar's Pandorapedia is used in this article, being the spelling given by an official site for the franchise.), Rey'tanu, Sarentu, Tawkami, Tayrangi, Ta’unui, Tipani, Tlalim, Tomac'ta, Trr'ong, and Zeswa. Many forest clans, such as the Omatikaya, live in a large tree, known natively as "Kelutral", and to humans as "Hometree", a direct translation of the Na’vi term. This tree served as the home of the clan and was a significant part of the clans specific culture and identity. Unlike Earth, where species, for example mammals, are quadrupeds, those found on Pandora are primarily six-legged due to the moon's low gravity and high atmospheric density combination. To be able to accumulate traction, species evolved a third pair of limbs. A real-world comparison being the Mars rovers, which use six-wheel platforms instead of four. Similarly to having multiple pairs of limbs, Pandoran animals, with the exception of Na'vi and their evolutionary link prolemuris, has antennae and two pairs of eyes. Lifeforms of Pandora, including both plants and animals, are bioluminescent. Some species of plants light up when interacted with. The single celled Earth lifeform dinoflagellates, that briefly glow when agitated, are used as the foundation for the concept. Water found in the oceans and rivers also glow when experiencing physical motion.

== Development ==
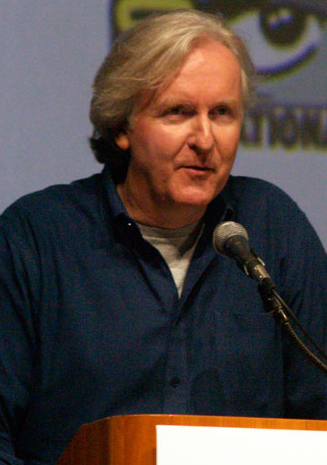
James Cameron, the creator of Pandora and the Avatar franchise, in 2009 at San Diego Comic-Con

An 80-page screenplay was originally developed by James Cameron for Avatar and its fictional universe in 1994. Upon analysing the planets within the universe of Star Wars, such as Tatooine and Dagobah, Cameron "figured that's not how complex worlds work", referring to Earth specifically. At the age of nineteen, Cameron dreamt of a "bioluminescent forest" with trees resembling "fibre-optic lamps". A glowing bioluminescent river was also present in the dream. These among other visions of flying lizards resembling frisbees and purple moss, led Cameron to begin drawing the world and wildlife of Pandora. Cameron applied his time observing underwater coral reef ecosystems and deep marine life whilst submarining into the first draft of Pandora. According to designer Neville Page, early on Cameron wanted the designs for Pandoran species to be "super-slick and aerodynamic, like a racecar with racing stripes". Working with Page and fellow designer Wayne Barlowe, Cameron found it difficult to match the design he was hoping for with what was being realised. Page noted that racecars themselves were styled after animal features such as turtle shells or insects, meaning Cameron's vision was circular. The planet was named after the first woman created by the Greek God Hephaestus, under the influence of Zeus. The woman, named Pandora, overwhelmed by curiosity, opened a forbidden box, releasing a plague upon the planet. This box became known as Pandora's box.

Stan Winston Studios was hired in 2005, by which time multiple artists such as Jordu Schell had contributed hundreds of pencil concepts to Cameron's team. The earliest design for Neytiri, originally named Zuleika, is traceable back to 1978 in the original Xenogenesis pilot, where an image of a blue woman can be observed. Schell initially began working on 3D models of Neytiri, but switched to maquettes at Cameron's request, eventually producing fifteen until a finalised version materialised. Cameron was inspired by the facial appearance of Q’orianka Kilcher, whilst Schell had images of ethnic women including Mary J. Blige. Once Cameron had approved the general design of Neytiri and the Na'vi, artists from Stan Winston Studio led by John Rosengrant began transforming them using Photoshop, applying skin texture with stripes and patterns featuring bioluminescence, prioritising organic looking flesh over artificial. Stan Winston Studio hired digital artist Scott Patton eight months into their production. Using ZBrush, Patton created detailed digital sculpts of Page's designs, specifically focusing on "a fleshy feel" directive from Cameron. A similar process was followed for creatures such as the viperwolf, direhorse and banshee, with Cameron approving a drawing, followed by Photoshop rendering and finally 3D sculpturing with ZBrush.

Cameron was inspired by multiple Earth locations when conceptualising the world of Pandora. The Huangshan Mountains in the Anhui Province of China were remodelled for Pandora by Cameron, who said they "had to simply re-create them in outer space." Locals identified the models created by Cameron were actually not the Huangshan mountains due to them being formations of granite, and were instead the Zhangjiajie pillars. Designers Dylan Cole, Steve Messing and their production team visited the mountains for photography during the initial creation of Avatar. The Zhangjiajie pillars were eventually used as the basis for the Hallelujah Mountains on Pandora. The mountains on Pandora are seen to float, the explanation being that superconductors float when in the presence of a magnetic field, with Pandora acting as a powerful superconductor due to the large amount of unobtainium beneath the surface, allowing the mountains to float as they do. The Hawaiian tropical rainforests of Kauai was another area that Cameron visited alongside cast members for experience, camping, cooking using underground fire pits and learning to traverse through areas that would appear very similar in the films. Areas such as Kalalau and Nā Pali were used as the inspiration for the rainforests and landscapes of Pandora, with non-CGI scenes filmed at Wailua.

== Appearances ==
=== Film ===
==== Avatar (2009) ====
Set in 2154, Avatar opens with the Resource Development Administration (RDA) on Pandora, a natural satellite of the gas giant Polyphemus which orbits Alpha Centauri A. A native species called the Na'vi (a blue, cat-like humanoid and intelligent species) occupy the moon and have a peaceful, strong connection with Pandora itself, and are against the presence of humans. Using genetically engineered Na'vi bodies, humans working for the RDA, including Jake Sully (Sam Worthington), attempt to ingratiate themself with the natives in an attempt to eventually convince them to leave their Hometree (the sacred home of the Omatikaya tribe), which the RDA plan to destroy to extract valuable unobtainium from beneath the moon's surface. Protagonist Jake Sully is seen bonding with the apex predator Great Leonopteryx (Na’vi: Toruk [Last Shadow]) after the destruction of Hometree, earning himself the title of Toruk Makto (Rider of Last Shadow). The atmosphere of Pandora is not breathable to humans, however almost all natural structures and organisms of Pandora's ecosystem resemble those on Earth.

==== Avatar: The Way of Water (2022) ====
Humans return to Pandora years after the conclusion of the first movie, with the oceans of Pandora becoming the primary setting. The movie introduces the Tulkun, a human-level intelligent and pacifistic cetacean species, with them also having an independently evolved language, emotions and spirituality. The Tulkun become a target of the RDA due to a yellow substance called "Amrita", which is produced by the species' brain. Amrita, when extracted after the death of a Tulkun, stops aging in humans, making the substance very valuable as a result. A new ocean tribe known as the Metkayina allow the family of Jake Sully to integrate into their way of life, with the tribe themself inhabiting an island with a coral reef. Species in the coral reefs and atolls of Earth have equivalents on Pandora, these including amalgams of Earth species including pufferfish and lionfish. Extinct Earth species such as plesiosaurs also have Pandora equivalents in the ilu. Other species such as skimwings resemble Earth's gar and flying fish, whilst Tulkuns are most similar to whales.

==== Avatar: Fire and Ash (2025) ====
This film introduces the volcano-dwelling Mangkwan tribe, and the nomadic Tlalim clan, also known as the Windtraders, who travel across Pandora on blimp-jellyfish creatures called Medusoid. It is shown that Pandora has the ability to adapt biology, specifically that of Spider in the film, so that species that would never normally be able to breathe on Pandora, are subsequently able to. It is believed that a fungus allowed for this biological change, with further changes showing the growth of a Na'vi specific "kuru" (a neural connection located within Na'vi hair that gives the ability to communicate with other species), along with psychic visions. In The Way of Water, Kiri experiences epileptic symptoms, described in the film as frontal lobe epilepsy, when connecting with a spiritual tree. Kiri's family reveal to her that she is the "literal child of Eywa", being an immaculate conception of Dr. Grace Augustine (Sigourney Weaver) from the first movie. Kiri connects to the underwater spirit tree of the Metkayina tribe, and unlocks the power of Eywa, directing the Pandoran ecosystem to attack the hostile RDA and Mangkwan alliance.

=== Video games ===
==== Avatar: The Game (2009) ====
Developed and published by Ubisoft in 2009, Avatar: The Game takes place on Pandora, with a story that mirrors the 2009 film, except with a character named Ryder taking the place of Jake Sully as the main protagonist. Dependent on choices the player makes throughout the story, different locations on Pandora can be seen in the game. The game gives the player access to large explorable regions on the moon, with areas featuring jungles, waterfalls, with a very heavy dark green centered color palette. Choosing RDA options exposes the player to "monstrous" plants that can spit poisonous fumes and attack with leaf swipes. Writing for Gamereactor, Jonas Elfving described Pandora as "lush, magical and fascinating from the get-go", though reasoned that whilst exploration of the moon was a "pleasant experience", some of the nature was "menacing", such as plants that consume limbs.

==== Avatar: Frontiers of Pandora (2023) ====
Developed by Massive Entertainment and published by Ubisoft in 2023, Frontiers of Pandora places players in the role of a young Na'vi who has to navigate an unfamiliar world. The game takes place in a previously unseen area of Pandora known as the "Western Frontier". Western Frontier is split into the Clouded Forest (an area that can only be reached by ikran and home to the Kame'tire clan), Kinglor Forest (a rainforest home to the Aranahe clan, who harvest silk from a moth creature known as Kinglor) and Upper Plains (multicolored hills and valleys, home to the Zeswa clan), with an estimated total explorable area size of 255km². Game map structure shares similarities with Far Cry 6 (2021), with an exploration mode that provides hints as a toggleable option over traditional POI markers.

== Other appearances ==
The front cover of Avatar: The High Ground, depicting Jake Sully and Neytiri in the foreground on the surface of Pandora, with Polyphemus in the background

=== Graphic novels ===
On Free Comic Book Day in 2017, Dark Horse Comics published an Avatar story, written by Sherri L. Smith, with art by Doug Wheatley, telling the story of the moment Jake Sully connects with the Great Leonopteryx during the first Avatar movie.

- Avatar: Tsu'tey's Path (2019): Written by Sherri L. Smith and published by Dark Horse Comics, Tsu'tey's Path tells the story of Omatikaya clan leader-in-training, Tsu'tey. The book takes place on Pandora concurrently to the first Avatar movie.
- Avatar: The Next Shadow (2021): Written by Jeremy Barlow and published by Dark Horse Comics, with illustrations by Josh Good and Gui Balbi, The Next Shadow returns to Pandora following the events Avatar and the destruction of Hometree. The novel tells the story of Jake Sully's immediate role as the new Omatikaya clan leader and the threat he faces in the face of a coup.
- Avatar: Adapt or Die (2022): Written by Corinna Bechko and published by Dark Horse Comics, with illustrations by Beni R. Lobel and colouring from Wes Dzioba, Adapt or Die serves as a prequel to the first Avatar movie, focusing on Dr. Grace Augustine and Mo'at's fight to find a cure for an illness affecting Na'vi children, upon visiting an RDA base. Augustine hopes to open a school for the children with the aim of improving relations between the Na'vi and humanity. The book takes place in the jungles of Pandora and reintroduces the Tawkami clan, who first appeared in the Nintendo DS version of Avatar: The Game (2009).
- Avatar: The High Ground (2022-23): A multipart series written by Sherri L. Smith and published by Dark Horse Comics, with illustrations and colouring from multiple artists including Gui Balbi. Originally written by James Cameron and intended as a direct sequel to the first Avatar movie, it was eventually scrapped due to Cameron and Jon Landau deciding it was not a good fit for a second movie, despite being "a hell of a read", according to Cameron. Set just before The Way of Water, The High Ground takes place on Pandora and primarily focuses on Jake and Neytiri's children. Set across three volumes, The High Ground focuses on Jake Sully's attempts to stop the RDA and rescue the Na'vi children from a base located in orbit.

The novels were released together as Avatar: Tales from Pandora Omnibus in 2025.

=== Stage shows ===
==== Toruk – The First Flight (2015-19) ====
In 2016, a theatrical adaptation of Avatar named Toruk – The First Flight written by Michel Lemieux and Victor Pilon, with production by Cirque du Soleil, began premiering at venues such as the Smoothie King Center in New Orleans, Louisiana. The story, set approximately 3000 years before the events of the first Avatar movie, focuses on two Na'vi children of the Omatikaya clan, named Ralu and Entu, Both Ralu and Entu undertake a coming-of-age ritual, which Ralu passes and Entu fails. A prophecy is foretold that lava will destroy the Tree of Souls (a tree used by Na'vi to connect to Eywa). With an Omatikaya talisman bestowed upon Ralu, the pair seek the remaining four talisman, one from each clan, to summon the great leonopteryx (also known as Toruk), who is the only one able to save the tree.

Toruk – The First Flight was developed in collaboration with James Cameron. The production used large puppets designed by Patrick Martel, controlled by puppeteers, with Toruk the largest, weighing 112 kilograms and measuring twelve metres wide. Cirque du Soleil were given creative freedom, multiple Na'vi clans featuring including the Anurai, Kekunan, Tawkami and Tipani. Human actors playing as Na'vi went through extensive makeup routines, taking two hours to complete, this time reducing to forty-five minutes with practice. Custom-fit unitards were worn, along with headpieces, shoes and gloves. A specific act required actors to wear large pink flowers that took up the entire stage, which itself was estimated to be larger than five IMAX screens. Actor Raymond O'Neill narrated the production in English, whilst the Na'vi followed a script written in their native language only, with no subtitles available to the audience. Pandora's bioluminescence was adapted for the stage by costume designer Kym Barrett, who incorporated glow-in-the-dark bodysuits and makeup, which worked in tandem with the purple and turquoise floor lights to create a complete experience comparable to the films. The stage used projectors to create a colourful environment, which assisted with transforming backdrops into various Pandoran landscapes, such as red deserts, volcanoes and waterfalls. Set designer Carl Filion made methodical design choices to keep the production as aligned with Na'vi culture as possible, including an absence of straight lines, a duel-revolving structure for Hometree and ninety-seven unique remotely controllable pneumatic traps that allow for easy transitions between different scenes.

As a global touring production, Toruk – The First Flight featured at many well established venues around the world. A critic writing for IRecommend.ru felt that Luzhniki Stadium in Moscow, Russia was not suitable due to perceived boredom from younger children and a lack of space. An interactive downloadable phone application that gave instructions to signed-up audience members also failed to function early on during a performance. Despite these drawbacks, they described the lighting and special effects as "magical", with metamorphoses "impressive" and "the world of Pandora" providing greater interest "than the performers." The O2 Arena in London served as the final venue before the show finished touring indefinitely in 2019. Microbiologist Dr. Tim Sandle praised the choreography of the performers at the London showing, referring to them as "impressive, engaging in a mix of tumbling, climbing an angled grid frame, swinging from trees, swinging from poles, and performing daring literal maneuvers at great height", however found the pre-recorded narration segments to be cliché. With so much going on, the Luzhniki critic found "it hard to tell who to watch", citing the most memorable moments being "tightrope walkers on Palulukan's skeleton, the giant flowers, the collective attempt to put out the fire, and one of the characters' interactions with a tree."

=== Theme parks ===
==== Pandora – The World of Avatar ====
Opened in 2017, as part of Disney's Animal Kingdom at Walt Disney World, Orlando, Florida, Pandora – The World of Avatar is an attraction that was first announced in 2011 by the resort, with construction, headed by Disney Imagineer designer Joe Rohde, commencing in 2014. Costing half a billion dollars to complete, the park is set generations after the movies where Pandora has been opened as a conservation park by an intergalactic travel agency known as Alpha Centauri Expeditions. Rohde architecturally referenced the work of Italian artist Gian Lorenzo Bernini in the design of the foundational structures of the park. Instead of relying on photos of architecture from cities such as Bangkok, Rohde implemented a team of people who could draw architectural influences from places they had each visited in person to help improve the "physicality of the experience".

Notable rides include the Avatar Flight of Passage, a three dimensional AR flying simulator that positions riders atop a bike, which is a mountain banshee (Na’vi: ikran), a Pandoran flying predator, in the simulator, flying across Pandora's biomes. The ride includes stimuli such as wind, water and "earthy" scents. Another is the Na'vi River Journey, a dark ride where people travel by boat down the fictional Kasvapan River, which is located within a bioluminescent rainforest. The ride includes physical recreations of foliage and twirling fan lizards, with predators such as viperwolves instead projected. An Audio-Animatronic Na'vi known as the "Shaman of Songs" concludes the ride. To create reactive bioluminescence, the park uses motion sensors which facilitates in lighting up foliage as guests pass by. Food and drink sold at the park is Pandoran themed, an example being the "Night Blossom" boba sold at the Pongu Pongu (Naʼvi language for Party Party) drinks stand. The drink contains limeade, apple and pear flavourings with passion fruit bobs balls, and a thematic pink and green colouring. The Valley of Mo'ara, which features the floating mountains were created for the park by "stacking" large rocks on top of one another. Using steel rods and a forced perspective to create the illusion that the rocks are floating, the tallest of these measures 156 feet high.

Praise was given to the park from visiting critics. Reporting for ETtoday on a 2024 visit, Tsai Wen-Chun described the parks Pandoran aesthetic and landscape as a "photographer's paradise". Both Wen-Chen and Mekado Murphy of The New York Times lauded the cascading waterfalls of the floating mountains. The mountain rock was distinguished as being carved out by over sixty artists, whilst being "surrounded by various Pandora-specific plants and rocks" with "nature pouring out". Megan McCluskey of Time Magazine included the park in the 2018 list of the World's Greatest Places. Among the reasons for its inclusion were the neon garden, the Flight of Passage ride and its position as the highest-rated attraction among guests at Walt Disney World.

== Native species ==
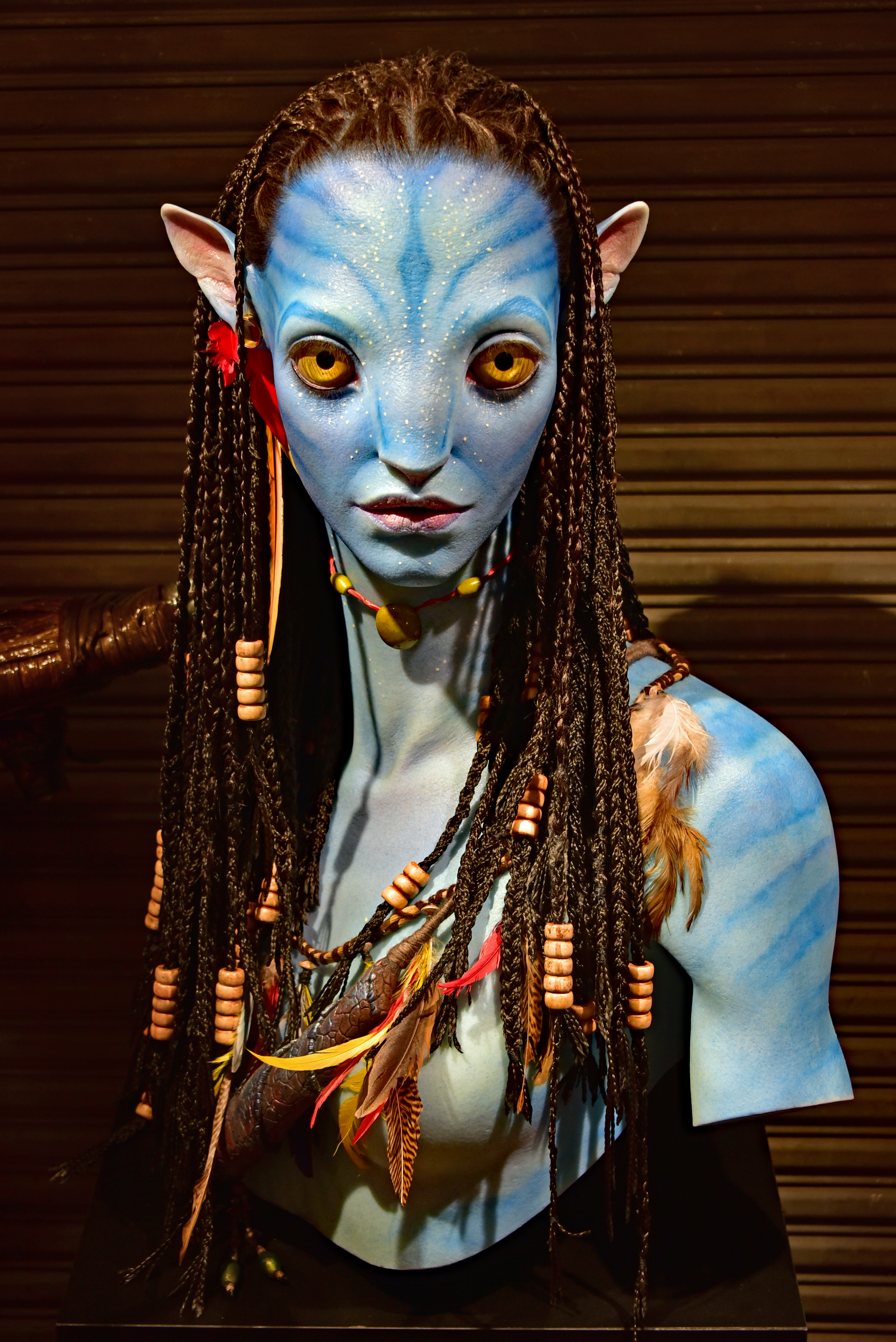
Neytiri, a Na'vi, who is a member of the Omatikaya clan

=== Na'vi ===
The Na'vi are an indigenous, humanoid species that inhabit Pandora along with other creatures. Sharing a common ancestor, multiple adapted populations live in Pandora's varied ecosystems. These populations live in clans, these consisting of the Anurai, Aranahe, Hulanta, Hyuticaya, Kame'tire, Kekukan, Li'ona, Mangkwan, Metkayina, Ni'awve, Olangi, Omatikaya, Rey'tanu, Sarentu, Tawkami, Tayrangi, Ta’unui, Tipani, Tla'lim, Tomac'ta, Trr'ong, and Zeswa. Members of the Omatikaya clan, such as Neytiri, live in a village society underneath a Hometree (Na’vi: kelutral), giant trees that house entire clans. Other clans, such as the Metkayina and Mangkwan, have adapted to living in the ocean and volcanic regions of Pandora respectively.

A neural connection called a "kuru" is located in the hair of Na'vi. Every species native to Pandora also has a kuru, translatable to "queue" in English. This "braid" can be connected between Na'vi and the creatures of Pandora, linking their minds and nervous systems. Na'vi use this connection to train species such as direhorses and ilu as a mode of transportation. In the film series, it is explained by Dr. Grace Augustine that Pandora contains more neural pathways than the human brain. Some Na'vi, such as Jake Sully, form a "bond" with these creatures, an example being the winged ikran. The "bond", known in Na'vi as "tsaheylu", allows Na'vi to connect with their ancestors in locations considered spiritual, such as at the "Tree of Souls". The Na'vi can also use tsaheylu to mate with a partner. It is confirmed in a deleted scene from the first Avatar movie that when engaging in coital activities, a Na'vi pair "intertwine tendrils" and embrace one another in a deep spiritual connection.

Na'vi stand at approximately ten feet tall in height. Standing on two legs, they have slender limbs, a tail that emerges from below the sacrum, used for balance. They have large yellow cat-like eyes, of which they have two, unlike other Pandoran species who have four. Na'vi are blue in colour, due to the ecology of the moon and have slight patterns visible on their skin, and have four fingers on each hand and four toes on each foot, of which the big toes are opposable. (Note: Human engineered Na'vi instead have five fingers on each hand and five toes on each foot, due to the presence of human DNA.) Na'vi of the Omatikaya clan wear loincloth, compared by James Cameron in design to taparrabo worn by the Maya people. The Metkayina, who live in and around water, wear shells, seagrass, along with other materials available in their area of habitat. Clan leaders adorn symbolic clothing, for example a leather piece across the chest of the Metkayina leader which symbolises the "guardian of the heart", and a cummerbund symbolising manhood for the Omatikaya leader.

==== Eywa ====
Eywa is described in the movies by Norm Spellman as a "goddess", who is within all living beings on Pandora. According to Jason A. Staples, the name "Eywa" is Yahwe written in reverse. James Cameron used the Jewish belief of a God in name. Na'vi refer to Eywa as "Great Mother" and "All Mother" in English, and is placed as the abiogenesis of Pandora. Eywa is not a mythological figure, instead serving as the embodiment of the entire moon. The roots of trees engage in electrochemical communication with each other, with the biosphere possessing consciousness. The Na'vi are able to physically connect to Eywa when they use their braids to connect to the Tree of Souls and other similar flora which function as the global brain's interfaces.

By using the Tree of Souls as a catalyst, Eywa has the ability to transfer the minds of non-Na'vi species, such as humans, into human-built Na'vi avatars. This process was attempted on the dying Dr. Grace Augustine, but failed due to the damage her body had taken. It was successful for Jake Sully however, who transferred into his Na'vi avatar body permanently at the ending of Avatar. Despite Grace's transfer not being successful, she was able to have a virgin birth due to a "seed" implanted in her body by Eywa, resulting in the birth of Kiri. By connecting Spider to Pandora with the use of woodsprites, Kiri was able to facilitate a process of endosymbiosis allowing Spider to grow a kuru and breathe Pandora's usually toxic air without requiring an oxygen mask. In the film, it is explained that the woodsprites' had spread fungus throughout his body, transforming him into a functional "zombified human". Kiri, unlike other Na'vi, has an ingrained connection with the Pandoran biosphere and life forces, possessing a "natural synchrony" and adaptability with unfamiliar environments such as the oceans. Despite this deeper connection, Kiri experiences seizures when attempting to connect with Eywa at locations such as the Metkayina Spirit Tree. After connecting to the tree again, with the assistance of Spider and Tuk, Kiri requests Eywa's aid, whereupon a giant face with both human and Na'vi features manifests itself. It is not known whether this manifestation was genuinely Eywa or instead a creation of Kiri's imagination.

=== Tulkun ===
The tulkun are a cetacean-type species that live in the oceans of Pandora. They are large bodied, with six flippers and a tail split into four. Tulkun have a gaping mouth, similar to humpback whales, inside of which their kuru is located. The roof of their mouth are bioluminescent blue and cyan, with purple and gold also. They have four eyes, similar to other Pandoran species. The leader of the Tulkun, known as the matriarch and patriarch, wear capes and stone hoop jewellery, to signify their elevated status among the species. Tulkun are extremely intelligent and understand the concept of maths, music and philosophy.

== Human interest ==
=== RDA ===
The Resources Development Administration (RDA) is a governmental corporate entity whose objective is to locate and extract resources from alien worlds, such as Pandora. These powers were granted conditionally by the Interplanetary Commerce Administration under the stipulation that the use of weapons of mass destruction are prohibited and military power be limited in use. RDA was originally set up by two founders on Earth out of Silicon Valley, and as of the films, is under the control of Parker Selfridge. The company hires a security division, SecOps, helmed by Colonel Miles Quaritch. Unobtainium is targeted by RDA for use as a high-value superconductor, along with amrita, a substance produced by Tulkun, that stops humans aging.

==== Technology ====
Technologically, humans have achieved monumental advancements by 2154: interplanetary and interstellar travel and space colonization; virtual 3D printing and holography mapping; and advanced methods of cryonics and psionics (via synthetic telepathy interface) are employed.

Using advanced genetic engineering, humans created hybrid bodies, called "avatars", from genetically distinct modified human DNA and Na'vi alien genetic material. Each Na'vi is customised for one specific human. Avatar bodies are considered "tabula rasa", possessing no outside input and acting as a mature vehicle for the human operator. These avatars are used by humans to survive Pandora's poisonous atmosphere. Genetically matched humans are then mind-linked to these "Avatars", using "link-beds", for remote control operation. Humans have developed advanced stem cell neuroregeneration technology that can cure Jake's paralysis. However, in 2154, it is still extremely expensive and is not covered by Veterans Affairs benefits. Quaritch is initially able to use Jake's desire to regain the use of his legs as leverage against him.

Technologies such as mechs were created to fit the story. They were designed to feel functional and "make sense", with fantasy type technology avoided. Concept artist Ryan Church based many drawings on aerodynamic research from previously classified NASA and DARPA technical papers. Humans use multiple types of spacecraft, these include the "Valkyrie", a space shuttle designed for use as a landing craft. The "Venture Star", a starship designed for travel between Earth and Pandora which covers the distance of 4.37 light years in 6.75 Earth years, a relative sustained speed of 0.7 times the speed of light. The "Dragon Assault Ship", a large gunship used for military operations, such as during the destruction of Hometree.

=== Earth in-universe ===
Earth is never seen in the film series, other than in the Avatar extended collector's edition, which shows scenes on Earth's streets and RDA agents at the Municipal Crematorium. Earth has been described by Jon Landau as a dystopian, overpopulated, "bleak" world, that has depleted its natural resources. According to character Jake Sully, Earth is a world where humans have "killed their mother". Avatar concept art by Dylan Cole and Seth Engstrom published in 2023, depicts Earth as a dying world, that is overcrowded and in a post-apocalyptic state. In the film series Colonel Miles Quaritch discusses serving three combat tours of duty in Nigeria before traveling to Pandora, noting that Jake is a veteran of the First Marine Reconnaissance unit of a military operation in Venezuela.

Jon Landau confirmed in 2022 that parts of Avatar 5 will take place on Earth, with the planet being viewed "through Neytiri's eyes".

== Real life counterparts ==
Astronomer Lisa Kaltenegger of the Harvard-Smithsonian Center for Astrophysics said in 2009 that moons orbiting gas giants, such as in the Alpha Centauri A system were plausibly able to be found with the use of the James Webb Space Telescope. Water, oxygen, carbon dioxide and methane were named as the elements required to identify moons with compositions similar to Pandora and Earth. NASA Exoplanet Science Institute executive director Charles A. Beichman later discovered a gas giant orbiting Alpha Centauri A in 2025 through the James Webb Space Telescope, concluding that it "probably" had moons. The gas giant was likened to Polyphemus, the gas giant that Pandora orbits, in Avatar. The gas giant is an exoplanet candidate.

== Academic references ==
- Anjum, Naila (July 2026). "Kiri in Avatar: The Way of Water: Disability, Difference, and Posthuman Embodiment in a Cinematic Ecosystem". Samyukta: A Journal of Gender and Culture. 11 (1): 1–17. doi:10.53007/SJGC.2025.V10.I2.244.
- Beichman, Charles; Sanghi, Aniket; Mawet, Dimitri; Kervella, Pierre; Wagner, Kevin; Quarles, Billy; Lissauer, Jack J.; Sommer, Max; Wyatt, Mark; Godoy, Nicolas; Balmer, William O.; Pueyo, Laurent; Llop-Sayson, Jorge; Aguilar, Jonathan; Akeson, Rachel; Belikov, Ruslan; Boccaletti, Anthony; Choquet, Elodie; Fomalont, Edward; Henning, Thomas; Hines, Dean; Hu, Renyu; Lagage, Pierre-Olivier; Leisenring, Jarron; Mang, James; Ressler, Michael; Serabyn, Eugene; Tremblin, Pascal; Ygouf, Marie; Zilinskas, Mantas (11 August 2025). "Worlds Next Door: A Candidate Giant Planet Imaged in the Habitable Zone of α Centauri A. I. Observations, Orbital and Physical Properties, and Exozodi Upper Limits". The Astrophysical Journal Letters. 989 (L22): L22. Bibcode:2025ApJ...989L..22B. doi:10.3847/2041-8213/adf53f.
- Belazouz, Asma (25 January 2024). "Representing Displacement and the Displaced in Avatar: The Way of Water (2022)". Afaque Cinemaia Journal. 10 (2). University of Algiers: 208–218.
- Bhattacharjee, Partha (December 2013). "Humans, Humanoids and Animals in Eywa: An Eco-critical Reading of James Cameron's Avatar". Bhatter College Journal of Multidisciplinary Studies. 3 (99–104). University of Burdwan.
- Borin, Norm; Savage, Arline (18 March 2013). "The sustainable corporation: lessons from Avatar". International Journal of Sustainable Strategic Management. 3 (4): 294–313. doi:10.1504/IJSSM.2012.052653.
- Burgett, Cole (7 January 2026). "The God Who Looks Back: A Review of 'Avatar: Fire and Ash'". Christian Research Journal. 49 (1).
- Fore, Dana. The tracks of Sully’s tears: disability in James Cameron’s Avatar. Jump Cut: A Review of Contemporary Media (Thesis). p. 1.
- Fritz, Justin (2012). "Environmentalism and the "Ecological Indian" in Avatar : A Visual Analysis". The Arbutus Review. 3 (1): 67–90. doi:10.18357/tar31201211530.
- Hafizh, Muhammad Fakhri (29 December 2025). Exploitation of nature in Avatar 2: The Way of Water (2022): An ecocritical analysis (Thesis). pp. 1–73.
- Holat, Olcay (23 December 2025). "Evaluation of "Avatar" Fictional Universe in the Context of Transmedia Storytelling Concept and Strategy". The New Media Journal (in Turkish) (19): 172–193. doi:10.55609/yenimedya.1626186.
- Hwang, Yeong Ji; Cho, Taig Youn (2021). "Analysis of Viewers' Appreciation for the Imaginary Pandora in the Movie Avatar". Archive of Design Research. 34 (2). doi:10.15187/adr.2021.05.34.2.5.
- Kaltenegger, Lisa (9 March 2010). "Characterizing Habitable Exomoons". The Astrophysical Journal Letters. 712 (L125): L125–L130. Bibcode:2010ApJ...712L.125K. doi:10.1088/2041-8205/712/2/L125. OSTI 21305070.
- Lioi, Anthony (19 December 2011). "The Triumph of Eywa: Avatar, Pantheism, and the Sign of an Ecological Ecumene". European Journal of Literature, Culture and Environment. 2 (2). The Juilliard School. doi:10.37536/ECOZONA.2011.2.2.418.
- Lundberg, Anita; Regis, Hannah; Agbonifo, John (30 March 2022). "Tropical Landscapes and Nature-Culture Entanglements: Reading Tropicality via Avatar". eTropic: Electronic Journal of Studies in the Tropics. 21 (1): 1–27. doi:10.25120/etropic.21.1.2022.3877.
- Picard, Fabienne (September 2023). "Ecstatic or Mystical Experience through Epilepsy". Journal of Cognitive Neuroscience. 25 (9): 1372–1381. doi:10.1162/jocn_a_0203. PMID 37432752.
- Potter, Mary-Anne (2019). "Human-Nature-Technology interfaces within the Avatar cinema-scape". Image & Text: A Journal for Design. 33 (1). University of South Africa: 1–16. doi:10.17159/2617-3255/2018/n33a9. hdl:10520/EJC-16fc082460. ISSN 2617-3255.
- Reagan, Wen (January 2010). "Scalp Locks, Gaia, and the Incarnation: History and Theology in James Cameron's Avatar". The Other Journal at The Seattle School of Theology & Psychology. No. 17 (Economics).
- Reynolds, Rowan; Ringrose, Chris; Roe, Robbie (2017). "Are the Hometrees in James Cameron's Avatar Structurally Possible?". Journal of Interdisciplinary Science Topics. University of Leicester: 1–2.
- Sanghi, Aniket; Beichman, Charles; Mawet, Dimitri; Balmer, William O.; Godoy, Nicolas; Pueyo, Laurent; Boccaletti, Anthony; Sommer, Max; Bidot, Alexis; Choquet, Elodie; Kervella, Pierre; Lagage, Pierre-Olivier; Leisenring, Jarron; Llop-Sayson, Jorge; Ressler, Michael; Wagner, Kevin; Wyatt, Mark (11 August 2025). "Worlds Next Door: A Candidate Giant Planet Imaged in the Habitable Zone of α Centauri A. II. Binary Star Modeling, Planet and Exozodi Search, and Sensitivity Analysis". The Astrophysical Journal Letters. 989 (L23). American Astronomical Society: L23. Bibcode:2025ApJ...989L..23S. doi:10.3847/2041-8213/adf53e.

== Bibliography ==
- Fitzpatrick, Lisa; Cameron, James; Jackson, Peter; Landau, Jon (2009). The Art of Avatar: James Cameron's Epic Adventure. Harry N. Abrams, Inc. ISBN 0810982862.
- Heath-Jones, Lauren (2017). "The highly anticipated new themed land, Pandora – The World Of Avatar, has opened in Florida. Lauren Heath-Jones shares her experience of Disney's latest investment" (PDF). Attractions Management. Vol. 22, no. 3. CLAD. pp. 48–51.
- Luzón-Aguado, Virginia (2022). "VI. Ecological Crisis and Visions of the Future". Turning Over a New Leaf Exploring Human-Tree Relationships in The Lorax and Avatar. Bloomsbury Publishing. pp. 245–262.
- Rose, Anthony L.; Rose, Anna Gabriella (2013). "AVATAR: The search for biosynergy and compassion". Ignoring Nature No More: The Case for Compassionate Conservation. University of Chicago Press. pp. 361–377.
- Rottenberg, Josh (18 December 2009). "James Cameron Talks Avatar: Brave Blue World". Entertainment Weekly. No. 1081. pp. 48–51.
- Wilhelm, Maria; Mathison, Dirk (November 2009). James Cameron's Avatar: A Confidential Report on the Biological and Social History of Pandora. HarperCollins. p. 147. ISBN 978-0-06-189675-0.
