= List of astronomy websites =

This is a list astronomy websites. Some of them are CalSky, Exoplanet Archive, Exoplanet Data Explorer, Extrasolar Planets Encyclopaedia, Universe Today, Space.com and Galaxy Zoo. Out of all these Exoplanet Archive is managed by NASA. These websites provide knowledge about exoplanets, eclipses, tides, comets, stars, galaxy and other topics about astronomy. These websites also serve as a knowledge sharing platform for astronomy students and astronomers.

== List ==
=== Astronomia.pl ===
Astronomia.pl was a Polish web portal for astronomy and space research. It was founded in 2001 and was active until 2015. While active, it was the largest astronomy and space portal in Poland, hosting over 3000 articles at its prime.

=== CalSky ===
CalSky (sky calendar) was web based astronomical calculator used by astronomers to plan observing. It was created by Arnold Barmettler a researcher at the University of Zurich and formerly a scientific assistant at the European Space Agency. The website, available in English and German, featured a calendar (and/or email notifications) generated for your location including information on aurora, comets, tides, solar and lunar eclipses, planets, bright satellite passes (ISS, HST, etc.), occultations, transits, iridium flares, and decaying satellites that may be visible. In 2020, the website ceased operation.

=== Exoplanet Archive ===
The NASA Exoplanet Archive is an online astronomical exoplanet catalog and data service that collects and serves public data that support the search for and characterization of extra-solar planets (exoplanets) and their host stars. It is part of the Infrared Processing and Analysis Center (IPAC) and is on the campus of the California Institute of Technology (Caltech) in Pasadena, CA. The archive is funded by NASA and was launched in early December 2011 by the NASA Exoplanet Science Institute (NExScI) as part of NASA's Exoplanet Exploration Program.

=== Exoplanet Data Explorer ===
The Exoplanet Data Explorer lists extrasolar planets up to 24 Jupiter masses.

=== Extrasolar Planets Encyclopaedia ===
The Extrasolar Planets Encyclopaedia is an astronomy website, founded in Paris, France at the Meudon Observatory by Jean Schneider in February 1995, which maintains a database of all the currently known and candidate extrasolar planets, with individual "note" pages for each planet and a full list interactive catalog spreadsheet. The main catalogue comprises databases of all of the currently confirmed extrasolar planets as well as a database of unconfirmed planet detections. The databases are frequently updated with new data from peer-reviewed publications and conferences.

=== Galaxy Zoo ===
Galaxy Zoo is an online astronomy project which invites members of the public to assist in the morphological classification of large numbers of galaxies. It is an example of citizen science as it enlists the help of members of the public to help in scientific research. Data from various surveys has been used and currently includes (up to 2025) SDSS, HST and JWST. It is part of the Zooniverse group of citizen science projects.

=== Space.com ===
Space.com is a space and astronomy news website. Its stories are often syndicated to other media outlets, including CNN, MSNBC, Yahoo!, and USA Today. Space.com was founded by former CNN anchor Lou Dobbs and Rich Zahradnik, in July 1999. At that time, Dobbs owned a sizeable share of the company, and, in an unexpected move, left CNN later that year to become Space.com's chief executive officer.

=== Universe Today ===
Universe Today
- Website type: News website
- Available in: English
- Owner: Fraser Cain
- Creator: Fraser Cain
- Website: universetoday.com
- Commercial: No
- Registration: Optional
- Launched: 1999

Universe Today (UT) is a non-commercial space and astronomy news site, founded in 1999 by Fraser Cain and edited by Nancy Atkinson. The news can then be discussed on the forums. The forum began on 24 July 2003, and was mainly used to discuss the Universe Today news as well as ask space-related questions and discuss alternate theories. In early September 2005, the forum merged with that of Bad Astronomy combined to form the BAUT forum. The website's viewership attains several million people per year.

Emily Lakdawalla, of The Planetary Society, said that she relies on Universe Today and Bad Astronomy to "give ... an independent look at big news stories" and that UT plays a key role in space-related journalism, along with other websites such as Space.com. Several peer-reviewed papers have mentioned Universe Today as being a space-related news website.

In 2008 the site was briefly banned for about a day from Digg.com, and then unbanned. In March 2011, Businessweek reported that the site had lost 20 percent of its traffic in five days after a change in the page ranking algorithm of Google. In April 2011, the Association of British Science Writers noted that Universe Today decided to ignore embargoed stories.
