= ExoKyoto =

Japanese exoplanet database

ExoKyoto is a database written in C++ that includes over 3,500 confirmed exoplanets as well as more than 120,000 stars. The database is led by Professor Yosuke Yamashiki of the Graduate School of Advanced Leadership Studies, at Kyoto University. ExoKyoto is particularly useful to visualize the habitable zone of different stars and compare their planets with the Solar System in terms of irradiance. Together with the Extrasolar Planets Encyclopaedia, the NASA Exoplanet Archive, the Open Exoplanet Catalogue, and the Exoplanet Data Explorer, ExoKyoto is a popular exoplanet database that is widely used.

== See also ==
- NASA Exoplanet Archive
