= Heavens Above =

Heavens Above may refer to:

- Heavens Above!, a 1963 film starring Peter Sellers and William Hartnell
- Heavens-Above, a non-profit satellite tracking organization
