= Palomar Transient Factory =

Astronomical survey program

- Alternative names: PTF
- Website: www.ptf.caltech.edu/page/ptf_about

The Palomar Transient Factory (PTF, obs. code: I41), was an astronomical survey using a wide-field survey camera designed to search for optical transient and variable sources such as variable stars, supernovae, asteroids and comets. The project completed commissioning in summer 2009, and continued until December 2012. It has since been succeeded by the Intermediate Palomar Transient Factory (iPTF), which itself transitioned to the Zwicky Transient Facility in 2017/18. All three surveys are registered at the MPC under the same observatory code for their astrometric observations.

== Description ==
The fully automated system included an automated realtime data reduction pipeline, a dedicated photometric follow-up telescope, and a full archive of all detected astronomical sources. The survey was performed with a 12K × 8K, 7.8 square degree CCD array camera re-engineered for the 1.2-meter Samuel Oschin Telescope at Palomar Observatory. The survey camera achieved first light on 13 December 2008.

PTF was a collaboration of Caltech, LBNL, Infrared Processing and Analysis Center, Berkeley, LCOGT, Oxford, Columbia and the Weizmann Institute. The project was led by Shrinivas Kulkarni at Caltech. As of 2018, he leads the Zwicky Transient Facility.

Image Subtraction for near-realtime transient detection was performed at LBNL; efforts to continue to observe interesting targets were coordinated at Caltech, and the data was processed and archived for later retrieval at the Infrared Processing and Analysis Center (IPAC). Photometric and spectroscopic follow-up of detected objects was undertaken by the automated Palomar 1.5-meter telescope and other facilities provided by consortium members.

Time-variability studies were undertaken using the photometric/astrometric pipeline implemented at the Infrared Processing and Analysis Center (IPAC). Studies included compact binaries (AM CVn stars), RR Lyrae, cataclysmic variables, and active galactic nuclei (AGN), and lightcurves of small Solar System bodies.

=== Scientific goals ===
PTF covered a wide range of science aspects, including supernovae, novae, cataclysmic variables, Luminous red novae, tidal disruption flares, compact binaries (AM CVn star), active galactic nuclei, transiting Extrasolar planets, RR Lyrae variable stars, microlensing events, and small Solar System bodies of the Solar System. PTF filled the gaps in the knowledge of the optical transient phase space, extended the understanding of known source classes, and provided the first detections or constraints on predicted, but not yet discovered, event populations.

=== Projects ===
The efforts being undertaken during the five-year project include:

1. a 5-day cadence supernova search
2. an exotic transient search with cadences between 90 seconds and 1 day.
3. a half-sky survey in the H-alpha band
4. a search for transiting planets in the Orion star formation region.
5. coordinated observations with the GALEX spacecraft, including a survey of the Kepler region
6. coordinated observations with the EVLA, including a survey of SDSS Stripe 82

=== Transient detection ===
Data taken with the camera were transferred to two automated reduction pipelines. A near-realtime image subtraction pipeline was run at LBNL and had the goal of identifying optical transients within minutes of images being taken. The output of this pipeline was sent to UC Berkeley where a source classifier determined a set of probabilistic statements about the scientific classification of the transients based on all available time-series and context data.

On few-day timescales the images were also ingested into a database at IPAC. Each incoming frame was calibrated and searched for objects (constant and variable), before the detections were merged into a database. Lightcurves of approximately 500 million objects had been accumulated. This database was planned to be made public after an 18-month proprietary period, subject to available resources.

The Palomar Observatory 60-inch photometric follow-up telescope automatically generated colors and lightcurves for interesting transients detected using the Samuel Oschin Telescope. The PTF collaboration also used a further 15 telescopes for photometric and spectroscopic follow-up.

== Near-Earth object observation ==
PTF uses software written to assist a human in weeding out false positives when searching for small near-Earth objects.

== Bibliography ==
=== 2009 ===
N. Law et al., PASP, 121, 1395:"The Palomar Transient Factory: System Overview, Performance, and First Results" — This paper summarizes the PTF project, including several months of on-sky performance tests of the new survey camera, the observing plans, and the data reduction strategy. It also includes details for the first 51 PTF optical transient detections, found in commissioning data.

A. Rau et al., PASP, 121, 1334: "Exploring the Optical Transient Sky with the Palomar Transient Factory" — In this article, the scientific motivation for PTF is presented and a description of the goals and expectations is provided.

=== 2008 ===
G. Rahmer et al., SPIE, 7014, 163: "The 12K×8K CCD mosaic camera for the Palomar Transient Factory" — This paper discusses the modifications to the CFHT 12K CCD camera, improved readout, new filter exchange mechanism, and the field flattener needed to correct for focal plane curvature.

== See also ==
- Zooniverse — Galaxy Zoo Supernovae
- List of near-Earth object observation projects
