= List of satellite pass predictors =

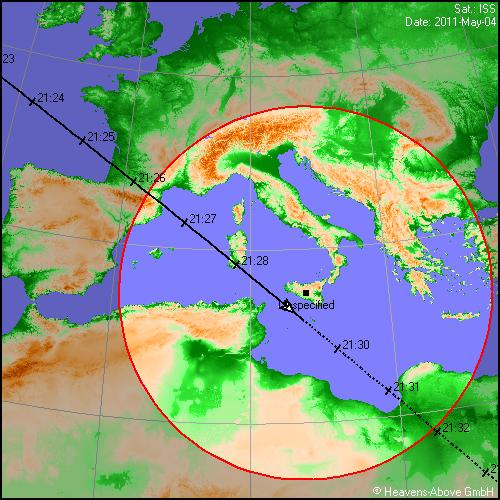
Ground track example from Heavens-Above. An observer in Sicily can see the International Space Station when it enters the circle at 9:26 p.m. The observer would see a bright object appear in the northwest, which would move across the sky to a point almost overhead, where it disappears from view, in the space of three minutes.

The following is a list of tools on a variety of platforms that may be used to predict the pass of an orbiting artificial satellite over a given point on Earth. They are used to generate a list of dates, times and directions when and where objects such as the International Space Station, Genesis, or Tiangong 1 space stations will be visible to ground observers, as well as many man-made objects that can be seen with the unaided eye including the Hubble Space Telescope.

== Web-based ==
- Pass Predictions API by Re CAE provides a live objects catalog and pass predictions. It features a filtering system for the catalog to only display objects with matching name or ID. The pass predictions generates, among other things, the time window, minimum elevation and the apparent brightness of the object in the sky.
- Satellite Tracking provides detailed real-time and pass predictions for Earth orbiting satellites.
- See A Satellite Tonight shows you where to look with Google Street View.
- Uphere.Space real time tracking and predictions. As soon as new satellites are launched this application begins tracking them.
- ISS Tracker, since 2015 the most popular ISS Tracker and passes list.
- Heavens-Above, called "the most popular website for tracking satellites" in 2007 by Sky and Telescope magazine and referenced by NASA websites. Linked from both NASA and ESA websites as a reference for locating satellites and spacecraft. Includes predictions for the ISS, space shuttle and other bright satellites, planets, minor planets, and comets.
- JPass, a java based web application. Offline since April 2010, replaced by NASA Skywatch web application.
- NASA Skywatch, Java based web application. Predicts visible passes for spacecraft, satellites and space debris.
- AMSAT Online Satellite Pass Predictions.
- N2YO provides real time tracking and pass predictions with orbital paths and footprints overlaid on Google Maps. It features an alerting system that automatically notifies users via SMS and/or email before International Space Station crosses the local sky. The N2YO.com system powers ESA's, Space.com's and many other's satellite tracking web pages.
- CalSky a service offered by Arnold Barmettler for astronomers to plan their observing sessions. Features a calendar (and/or email notifications) generated for your location including information on aurora, comets, tides, solar and lunar eclipses, planets, bright satellite passes (ISS, HST, etc.), occultations, transits, Iridium flares, and decaying satellites that may be visible. Retired, October 2020, then continued
- Free HTTP API Free HTTP API for satellite predictions. JSON and iCal formats. Offered as a "best effort" resource.
- Spectator, allows real-time tracking and overpass prediction for Earth Observation satellites. It also connects to data APIs, allowing users to get latest images from tracked satellites.
- Where the ISS at? provides real time tracking and push notifications (via email) for ISS passes over your location. REST API available as well.
- ISS online ISS Live webcam. ISS passes over your location. Photo from ISS on map. ISS tracker. Current ISS Crew.
- tracksat.space, free web application for tracking satellites orbiting Earth. Allows to check passes over chosen locations, predict satellites' future positions and set up custom browser notifications. Users can create their personal dashboards to display data for multiple satellites and ground stations.

== Desktop Devices ==
=== Windows ===
- Satellite Tracking – tracks all Earth orbiting satellites while providing detailed location information for the users location, pass prediction listing, and Yaesu rotor and Icom radio automated profiles and control.

=== MacOS ===
- Satellite Tracker
- SatGazer - includes various orbit and object pass visualization options, and SatNOGS API integration.
- SatTracker

=== Linux ===
- Gpredict – GPL satellite tracking app

== Mobile Devices ==
=== iOS ===
This section includes applications for the iPhone, iPad and iPod touch. Apps generally use coordinates provided by the device's built in GPS. Some require an active internet connection others update periodically

- Horos by Re CAE shows in real time all the objects in orbit - spacecraft and debris. Announced features include interactions with the objects in orbit, timeline acceleration / deceleration, ground tracks and VR visualisation of objects passing over the user's location.
- GoSatWatch from GoSoftWorks, supports multiple viewing sites (home, vacation spot, etc.), no internet connection required (one data is loaded and periodically updated). View satellite position on world map or a simple polar chart showing the path the satellite will take across your sky.
- ISS Visibility, interface to Heavens-Above, predictions up to 30 days out, ground tracks, star chart with path shown.
- SkySafari shows alerts for Iridium flares and ISS passes.
- ISS Detector – shows ISS position. Can show more satellites through in-app purchases.
- "Star Walk: Constellation Finder" from Vito Technology Inc shows both Iridium flares and ISS passes.
- Satellite Tracker - (ProSat) Displays satellite paths 7 days in advance and operates offline until additional days are needed. Compass view of paths as well as 3D earth view. Allows user to input and store satellite radio frequencies while accounting for live doppler shift.

=== Android ===
- ISS SpaceX Satellite Tracking – tracks all Earth orbiting satellites while providing detailed location information for the users location, plus pass prediction listing.
- TrackSat - Satellite tracker – can track satellites orbiting the Earth in real time and predict their passes over your specific geolocation. Includes satellites such as International Space Station (ISS), Starlink, SpaceX Crew Dragon, Terra, NOAA and many others.
- ISS on Live, app with live cameras of ISS, realtime tracking position and visible passes prediction. It also predicts sunrises, sunsets and daytime passes.
- Satellite AR, by Analytical Graphics augmented reality view of the sky for currently visible satellites only. Includes modes for ISS and bright objects as well as modes which include the thousands of all known satellites.
- Satellite Passes, supports world map view, augmented reality view, satellite footprint, simulation mode and notifications.
- Heavens Above has an Android app with functionalities similar to the website.
- ISS Detector – shows ISS position. Can show more satellites, comets and planets through in-app purchases.
- Look4Sat – predicts satellite passes from a two-line element set database, including a polar view function with satellite footprints.

=== Cross-platform ===
- Spymesat, by Orbit Logic, a mobile app for iOS and Android, computes pass predictions for any selected location for available commercial and unclassified government high-resolution imaging satellites and provides real-time notifications and dynamic real-time imaging resolution and satellite position information and maps during predicted passes. SpyMeSat also includes the ability to download recent high-resolution satellite images for the user-selected location, or task selected imaging satellites to take a new image.

== Dedicated devices ==
- Geochron electronic world clock, displaying on an HDTV monitor

== Software libraries ==
- Astro::satpass Perl library by Tom Wyant, calculates star, Sun, and Moon positions as well as satellite pass predictions. Interfaces with Celestrak or Space Track.
- OreKit Java library for low-level space dynamics library.

== Raw orbital data ==
All websites and applications base their predictions on formula using two-line element sets which describe the satellites and their orbits.

- Celestrak provided by Dr. T.S. Kelso, includes visible objects, openly available
- SpaceTrack maintained by the United States Strategic Command provides orbital information on unclassified satellites requires an account but is available for educational and hobbyist use as well as military, government and spacecraft and payload owners.
- JPL Horizons On-Line Ephemeris System, maintained by the Solar System Dynamics Group at the Jet Propulsion Laboratory, provides ephemeris for asteroids, comets, planets, moons, solar system planets, the Sun, and some spacecraft.
- Satellite Calculations
- TLE API satellite data provided in JSON format over REST API. Source https://api.nasa.gov/
