= NASA Exoplanet Archive =

Online astronomical exoplanet catalog and data service

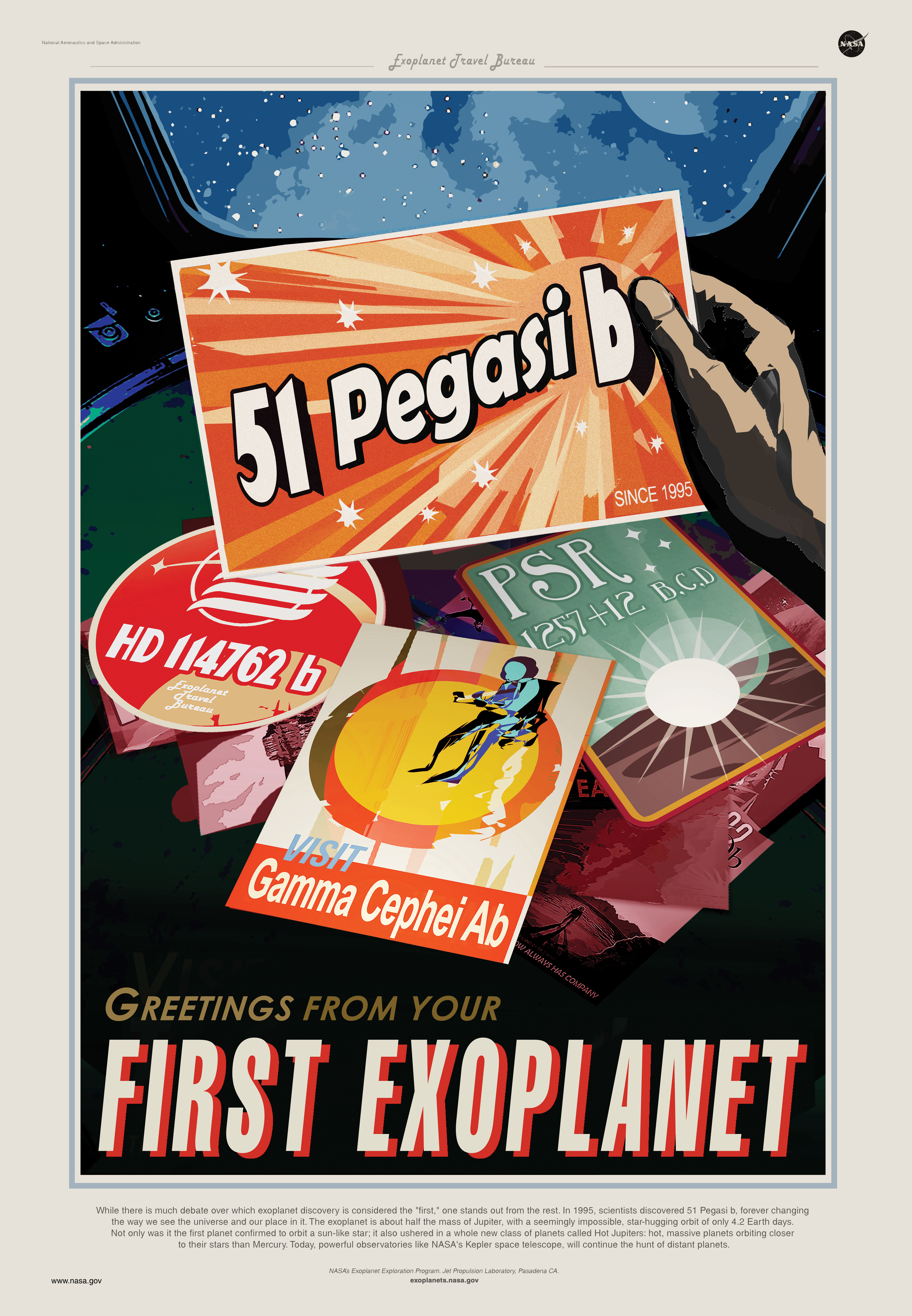
- A light-hearted poster created by NASA for the "Exoplanets Exploration Program's Exoplanet Travel Bureau"
- Website type: Astronomy
- Creator: Operated for NASA by NExScI at Caltech
- Website: exoplanetarchive.ipac.caltech.edu
- Current status: Active

The NASA Exoplanet Archive (NEA) is an online astronomical exoplanet catalog and data service that collects and serves public data that support the search for and characterization of extra-solar planets (exoplanets) and their host stars. It is part of the Infrared Processing and Analysis Center and is on the campus of the California Institute of Technology (Caltech) in Pasadena, California. The archive is funded by NASA and was launched in early December 2011 by the NASA Exoplanet Science Institute as part of NASA's Exoplanet Exploration Program. As of 20 August 2026, the archive lists 6,354 confirmed exoplanets in its collection.

The archive's data include published light curves, images, spectra and parameters, and time-series data from surveys that aim to discover transiting exoplanets. The archive also develops Web-based tools and services to work with the data, particularly the display and analysis of transit data sets from the Kepler mission and COnvection ROtation and planetary Transits (CoRoT) mission, for which the Exoplanet Archive is the U.S. data portal. Other astronomical surveys and telescopes that have contributed data sets to the archive include SuperWASP, HATNet Project, XO, Trans-Atlantic Exoplanet Survey and KELT.

According to third-party web analytics provider SimilarWeb, the company's website has over 130,000 visits per month, as of January 2015.

== Exoplanet Data Content ==
The Exoplanet Archive contains objects discovered through all methods (radial velocity, transits, microlensing, imaging, astrometry, eclipse timing variations, and transit timing variations/TTV) that have publicly available planetary parameters, with a mass (or minimum mass) equal to or less than 30 Jupiter masses.

== Exoplanet Archive Tools and Services ==
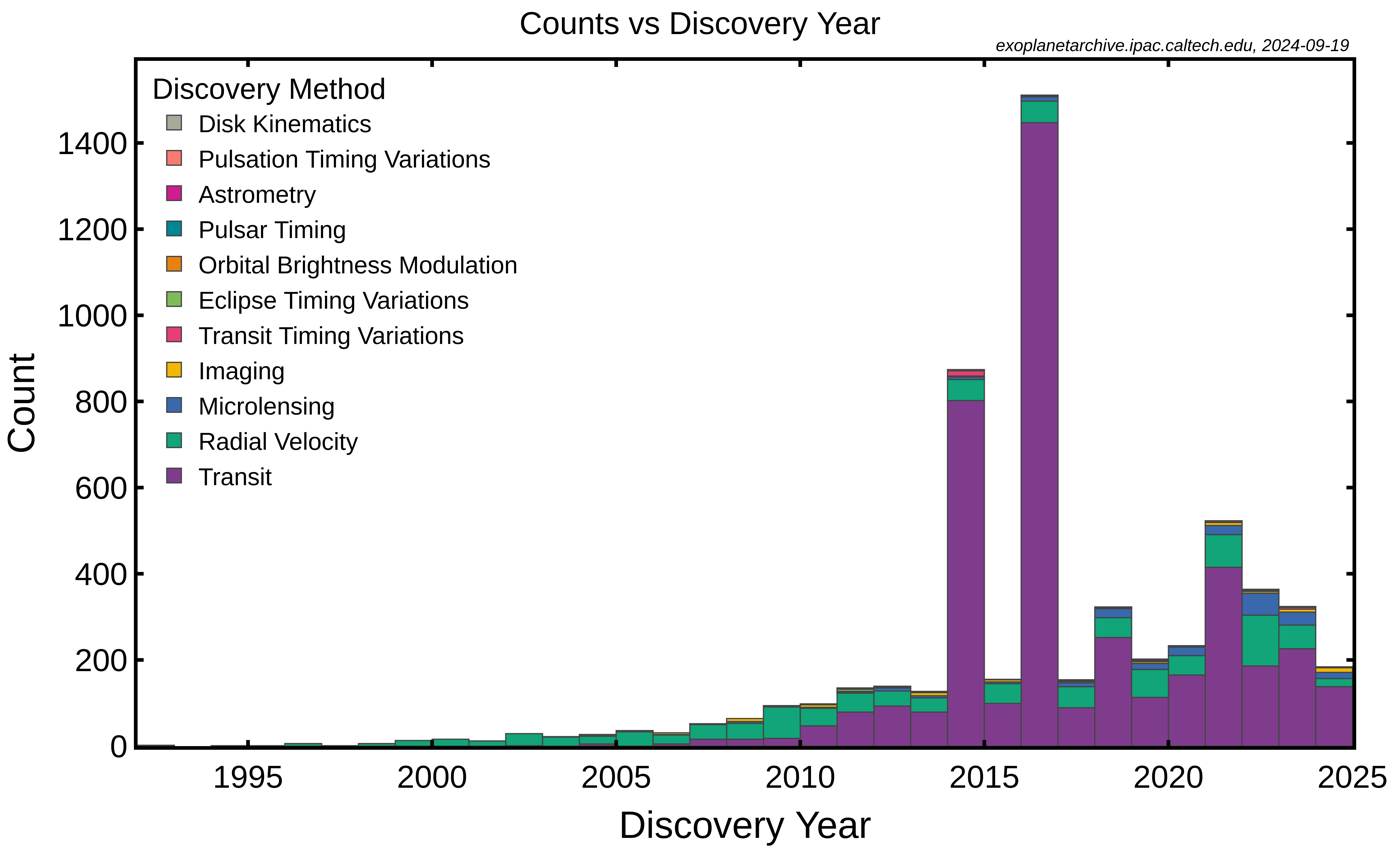
Exoplanet detections per year as of 2024

In addition to providing access to large public data sets, the Exoplanet Archive has developed several tools to work with exoplanet and stellar host data.

- Interactive Visualizers for Planet Parameters: These interactive tables display data for confirmed planets, Kepler Objects of Interest (KOIs), Threshold-Crossing Events (TCEs) and target stellar data that users can filter, sort and download or export to other Exoplanet Archive services, such as light curve visualization for the Kepler stars.
- Kepler Light Curve Viewer: Interactive display of user-selected quarters for a single Kepler target. Any column from the light curve file can be plotted with or without normalization and sent to the periodogram or phase tool.
- Periodogram Service: This tool calculates the periodogram of time series data from the archive or a file uploaded by the user. The service supports three algorithms: Lomb-Scargle periodogram, Box-fitting Least Squares (BLS) and Plavchan. Phased light curves for the most significant periods are also available.
- Transit and Ephemeris Calculations: This service returns an ephemeris of the times of transit of the exoplanet across its host star. Optionally, for a given longitude and latitude or observatory, the service tabulates times of transit at that location and can calculate the time for secondary transits or other phase points in the orbit.
- Application Program Interface (API): This service allows a user access to the contents of the exoplanet and host star table and the Kepler candidate table via a URL or command-line-based query.
- Pre-generated Plots: Ready-made plots that provide the community with fast access to presentation material that describe the current state of the exoplanets field in terms of their number and our understanding of their orbital and physical characteristics.
- EXOFAST Transit and Radial Velocity Fitting Tool: An important fitting tool for astronomers who want to use transit light curves or radial velocity data and various inputs to create models of planet systems. This web service is based on the original code by Jason Eastman.

== Transit Survey Data in the Exoplanet Archive ==
The Exoplanet Archive serves photometric time-series data from surveys that aim to discover transiting exoplanets, such as the Kepler Mission and CoRoT. The database provides access to over 22 million light curves from space and ground-based exoplanet transit survey programs, including:

- Kepler and K2 Public Survey Data
- CoRoT Exoplanet Survey data
- CoRoT Asteroseismology data
- HATNet Survey data
- XO Survey data
- TrES Survey data
- KELT Survey data
- SuperWASP light curves
- UKIRT Microlensing Survey data

The Exoplanet Archive offers search and filtering capabilities for exoplanet stellar and planetary properties, Kepler planetary candidates, and time series data sets. All data in the Exoplanet Archive are vetted by a team of astronomers and the original literature references are available.

The Exoplanet Archive supports interactive visualization of images, spectra, and time series data and maintains its own stellar cross-identification to minimize ambiguity in multiple star components.

== See also ==
- Exoplanet Data Explorer
- Exoplanet
- List of exoplanets
- Encyclopaedia of Exoplanetary Systems
- Star
- ExoKyoto
- Open Exoplanet Catalogue
- List of astronomy websites
