= Open Exoplanet Catalogue =

Catalogue of exoplanets

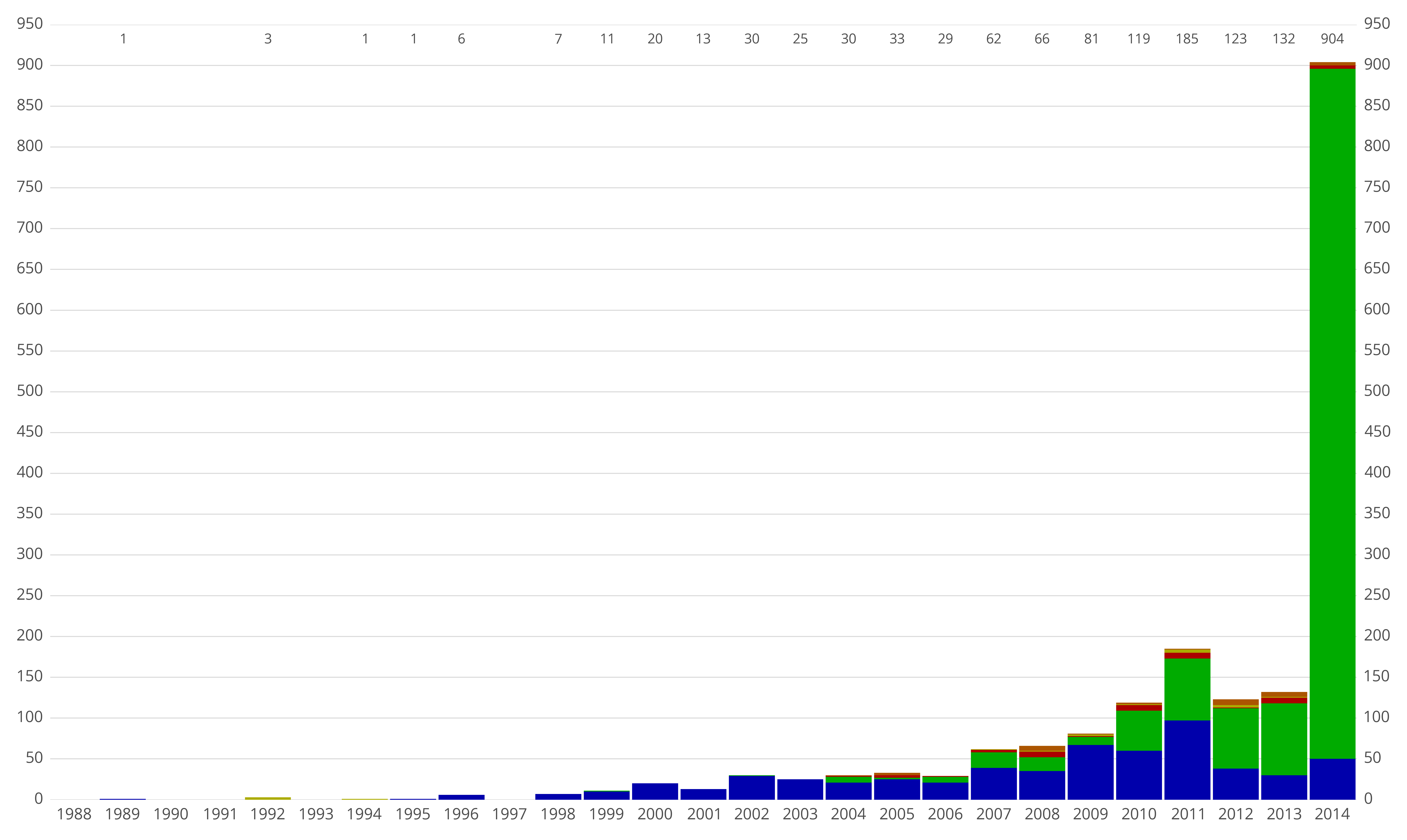
Number of exoplanets classified by method of discovery

The Open Exoplanet Catalogue is a catalogue of all discovered extra-solar planets. It is a new kind of astronomical database decentralized and completely open.

It is considered one of the four exoplanet catalogues most widely used, together with the Extrasolar Planets Encyclopaedia, the NASA Exoplanet Archive, and the Exoplanet Data Explorer.

In 2012, Hanno Rein presented a new kind of astronomical database based on small text files and a distributed version control system.

In 2016, Ryan Varley presented ExoData, Python interface and exploratory analysis tool for the Open Exoplanet Catalogue.

== Statistics ==
As of October 2020, the Open Exoplanet Catalogue has the following statistics:

Number of confirmed exoplanets	4319
Total number of planets (including Solar System objects and unconfirmed exoplanets)	4441
Number of planetary systems	3261
Number of binary systems	159
Number of commits	19312
