= Geochron =

American clock company

- Founded: 1965
- Founder: James Kilburg
- Headquarters: Estacada, Oregon, U.S.
- Products: Geochron Global Time Indicator

Geochron, Inc. is an American company founded in 1965 by James Kilburg, an inventor from Luxembourg. It is also the name of their flagship product, the Geochron Global Time Indicator. The Geochron was the first world clock to display day and night on a world map, showing the sinh "bell curve" of light and darkness. The Geochron employs an intricate analog clockwork mechanism for its display, that shows the month, date, day of the week, hours and minutes, the areas of the world currently experiencing day and night, and the meridian passage of the sun. The main display is dominated by a world map, with time zones prominently indicated. At the top of the map are arrows corresponding to each time zone. As each day progresses, the map is scrolled from left to right by gear mechanisms, and the arrows for each time zone shift their positions relative to a stationary band fixed at the top that has a horizontal series of numbers representing hours. The viewer may read the time by seeing what number the time zone's arrow is currently pointing to. The map is backlit, and a mechanism behind the map defines well-lit and shaded areas that are also stationary relative to the movement of the map. In this way, as time progresses, different areas are shown to be experiencing daytime and night. The center of the lit area lines up with the 12 noon on the stationary time strip. There is also a day-and-month readout below the map, and a minutes readout above.

Each Geochron is assembled upon demand, with prices starting at above $1,500. President Ronald Reagan presented a Geochron to Mikhail Gorbachev in 1985 as an "example of American ingenuity." In the mid-1980s, the company was selling about 75 clocks per month, increasing to around 200 per month during the holiday season. It had 16 employees in 1987.

The Hubble Space Telescope control center at Goddard Space Flight Center uses a Geochron in its day-to-day operations. The European Space Agency displays a Geochron in their command center. The Smithsonian Institution has called the Geochron the "last significant contribution in timekeeping." The world clock was featured in motion pictures such as Hunt for Red October, Patriot Games, Clear and Present Danger and Three Days of the Condor.

Founder James Kilburg died in 1985. His son, James M. Kilburg, had purchased one-third of the company from his father a short time earlier. Bob Williamson acquired the other two-thirds of the company, and he and the younger Kilburg became partners in managing the business.

After many years in Redwood City, California, in 2007 Geochron Enterprises was sold and moved to Oregon City, Oregon, and became Geochron, Inc. It was sold again in 2015, to Patrick Bolan. The Geochron World Clock has been updated under new management to include new mapsets, lighting options, and new magnetic stepper motors. Geochron World Clocks are still built and restored by hand and manufactured at a small machine shop in Oregon City. In September 2019, the company announced that it was preparing to move from Oregon City to Estacada, Oregon.

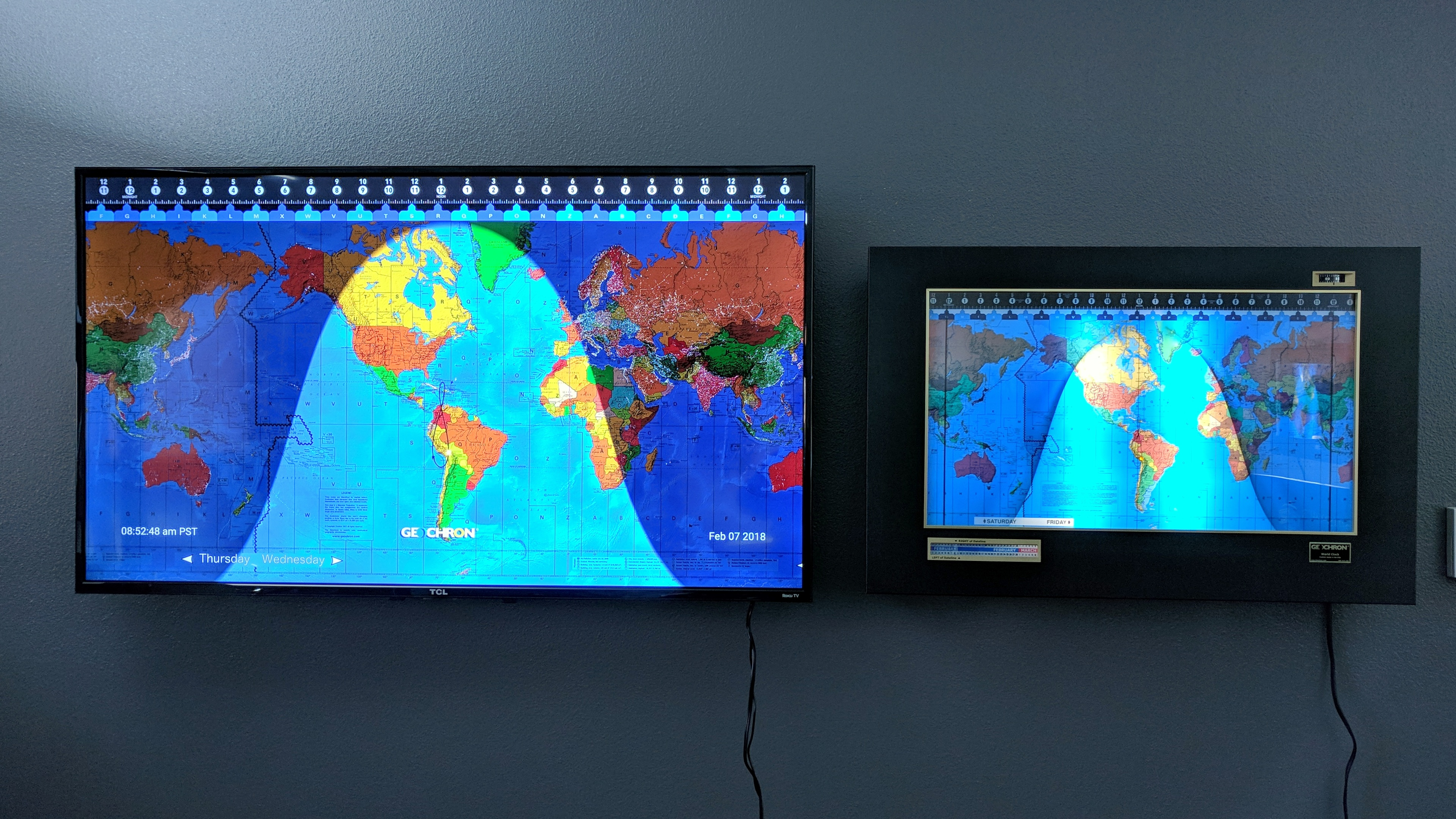
Geochron Digital and Mechanical side by side on wall.

In 2018, Geochron released an electronic version of its mechanical clock, optimized for 4K resolution displays. It includes many features that were unavailable prior to the internet, including satellite tracking, and demographic layers above different mapsets. All Geochron mapsets are in a Mercator Projection. As of October 2019, the company continues to sell the mechanical version, in addition to the digital version.

== See also ==
- List of satellite pass predictors
