= Clara Moskowitz =

American science journalist

Clara Moskowitz is an American science journalist who works as a senior editor for Scientific American.

== Career ==
Moskowitz majored in astronomy and physics at Wesleyan University, graduating in 2005. She went to the University of California, Santa Cruz for a master's degree in science communication, which she completed in 2007 after internships with the American Museum of Natural History and Discover magazine. After five years covering Space Shuttle missions for Space.com, she moved to her present position at Scientific American in 2014.

== Recognition ==
In December 2015, the American Physical Society named her Woman Physicist of the Month.

== Publications ==
- "Marie Curie's Hidden Network: How she recruited a generation of women scientists", Scientific American, vol. 332, no. 2 (February 2025), pp. 78–79.
