= World Clock (Alexanderplatz) =

Large clock in Berlin, Germany

Coordinates: 52°31′16″N 13°24′48″E

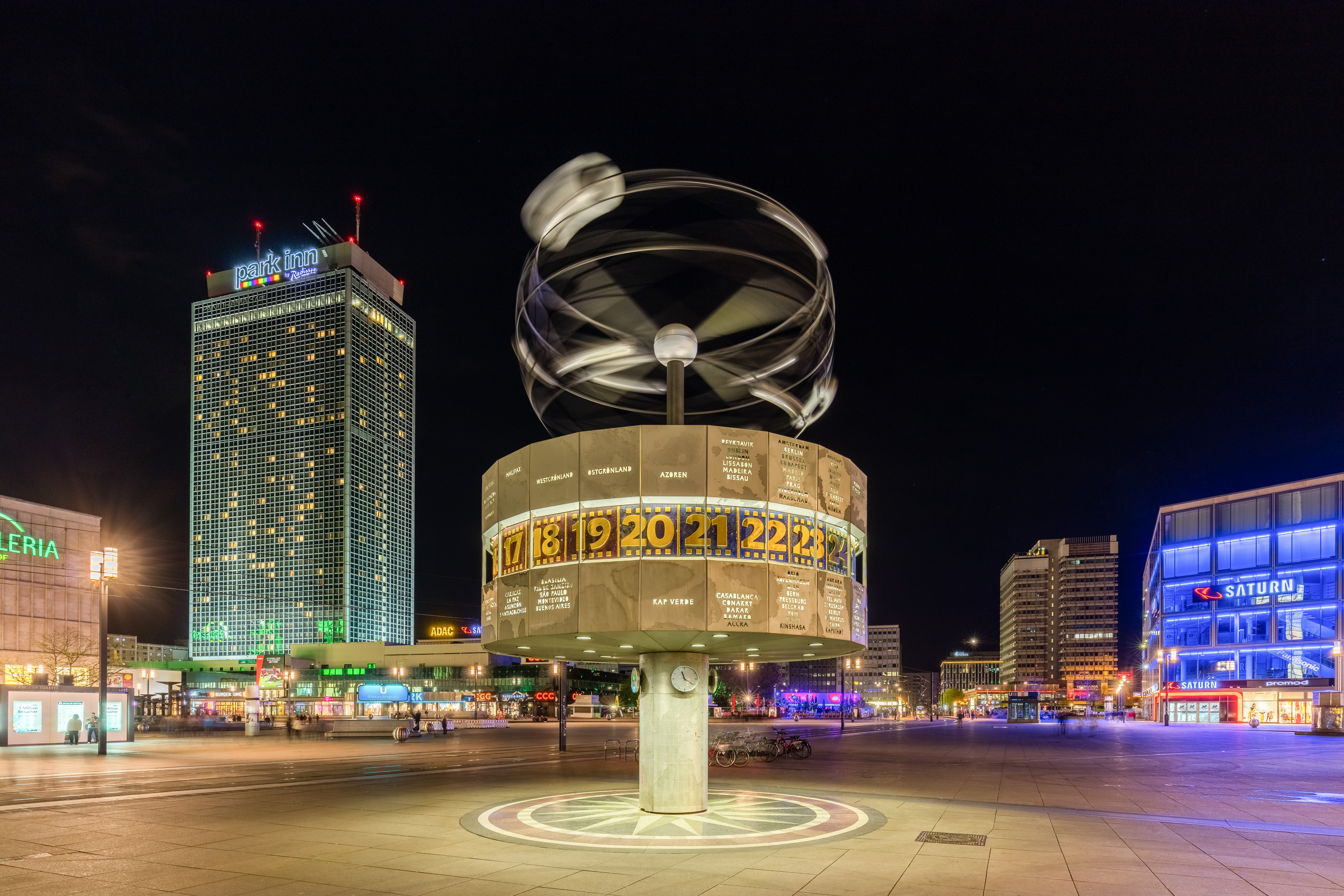
A night view of the World Clock, taken on 22 April 2016

The World Clock (German: Weltzeituhr; pronounced [ˈvɛltt͡saɪ̯tˌʔuːɐ̯]), also known as the Urania World Clock (Urania-Weltzeituhr), is a large turret-style world clock located in the public square of Alexanderplatz in Mitte, Berlin. By reading the markings on its metal rotunda, the current time for 148 major cities from around the world can be determined. Since its erection by East Germany in 1969, it has been a tourist attraction and meeting place. In July 2015, the Federal Government of Germany declared the clock as a historically and culturally significant monument.

== History ==
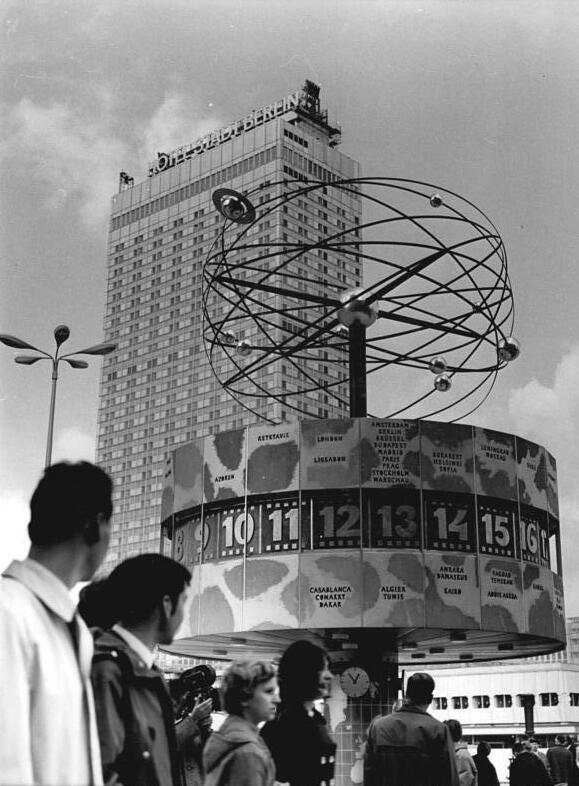
The World Clock shortly after it was opened to the public, photo taken on 3 October 1969

The sixteen ton world clock was opened to the public on 30 September 1969, shortly before the twentieth anniversary of the German Democratic Republic, along with the Fernsehturm in East Berlin. The erection of the clock was part of a larger plan to expand and reorganize Alexanderplatz as a whole. At the end of the renovations, the public square was four times larger than it was at the end of the World War II.

The clock was designed by the designer Erich John, who at the time was an employee of the planning group for the transformation of Alexanderplatz under the direction of Walter Womacka. Before designing the clock and managing its construction, John was a lecturer at Kunsthochschule Berlin-Weißensee (then called the Hochschule für bildende und angewandte Kunst, "College of Fine and Applied Arts"), where he taught product design. The idea to erect a clock in Alexanderplatz was had when the wreckage of the Uraniasäule (a.k.a. Wettersäule), a pre-World War II public clock, was found during the restoration of the square in 1966.

The construction of the clock required more than 120 engineers and other experts, including the sculptor Hans-Joachim Kunsch; the Getriebefabrik Coswig company was also instrumental in its construction. In Germany at the time, there was no widely recognized design award, so John did not receive one for his work. However, he received a design award for a different design of his in 1982.

In 1987, a commemorative coin was released with the image of the World Clock. In 1997, during a necessary repair to the mechanism, the clock was updated in consequence of German unification and the end of the Cold War; cities which had been renamed or which moved time zones were updated: For example, Leningrad was changed to Saint Petersburg and Alma Ata to Almaty, while Kyiv was moved from Moscow time to Eastern European Time. Twenty cities that were omitted by the DDR for political reasons, such as Tel Aviv, Cape Town, and Seoul, were also added to the clock.

== Function ==
The main feature of the World Clock is a large twenty-four sided column (the cross-section of which is a regular icositetragon). Each side of the column represents one of the twenty-four main time zones of the Earth, and has the names of major cities which use that time zone engraved into it. A windrose is painted onto the pavement below the column which holds up the clock. Four smaller analog clocks are located on the sides of the narrow column which holds up the rotunda, and the entire clock is more than large enough for people to stand under it and read the smaller clocks.

The clock is mechanical, and in normal operation is constantly in motion, although the motion is too slow to be seen by a human observer – it is only readily apparent in timelapse recordings. Numbers – in a line from one through twenty-four – revolve around the outside of the clock throughout the day. To read the clock, a user finds the side of the icositetragon which corresponds to the city or time zone they are interested in and notes the number under it. The number corresponds to the current hour in that city. If the number is not directly under the side, but is instead off-set by some fraction, that can be used as a way to estimate the number of minutes past the hour it is in that city. This is made easier because each number is in a different-colored rectangle, the length of which corresponds to one side of the icositetragon.

Cities in time zones which are not exact hours offset from UTC, such as New Delhi which is situated in the Indian Standard Time (IST) zone (UTC+05:30), have their offset in minutes engraved next to them. For New Delhi, the engraving is "NEW DELHI +30`".

Once per minute, an artistic sculptural rendering of the Solar System made of steel rings and spheres rotates. Including the sculpture, the World Clock is 10 m (33 ft) high.

The clock is driven by an electric motor which resides in a space of 5 m (16 ft) × 5 m (16 ft) × 1.9 m (6 ft 3 in). This motor drives the gearbox, which was rebuilt from one made by Trabant. During the 1997 renovation of the clock, Aurotec GmbH replaced parts of the original equipment which were failing.

== Social relevance ==
Since the 1970s, the clock has become the scene of protests, as well as a landmark used by Berliners living near the area to meet others.

On 12 May 1983 the Bundestag deputies of The Greens, including Petra Kelly, Gert Bastian and three other deputies, unrolled a banner with the inscription "The Greens – swords to plowshares" before the world clock and were arrested.

On the 40th anniversary of the German Democratic Republic on 7 October 1989, opposition political groups formed a demonstration which began at the clock and ended at the Palace of the Republic. The state responded by arresting over 1,200 of the protesters. Thirty-three days later, the Berlin Wall fell.

== Gallery ==
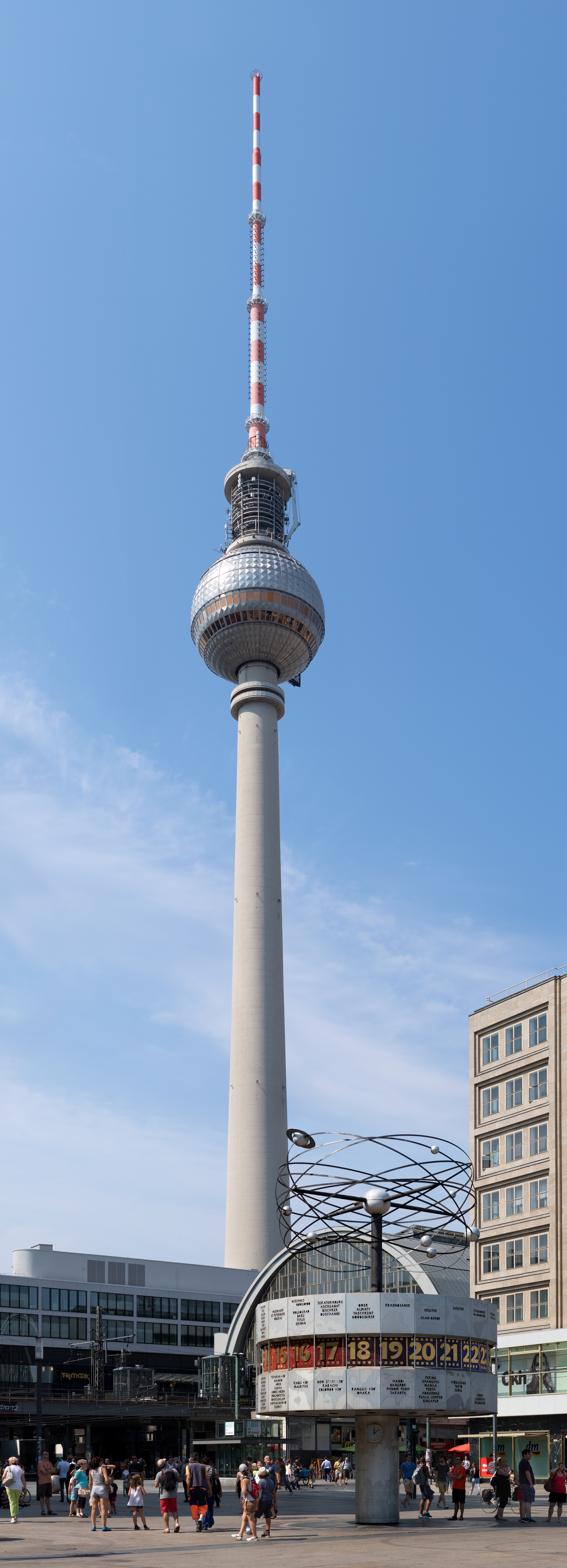
The Berlin TV tower overlooks the World Clock.

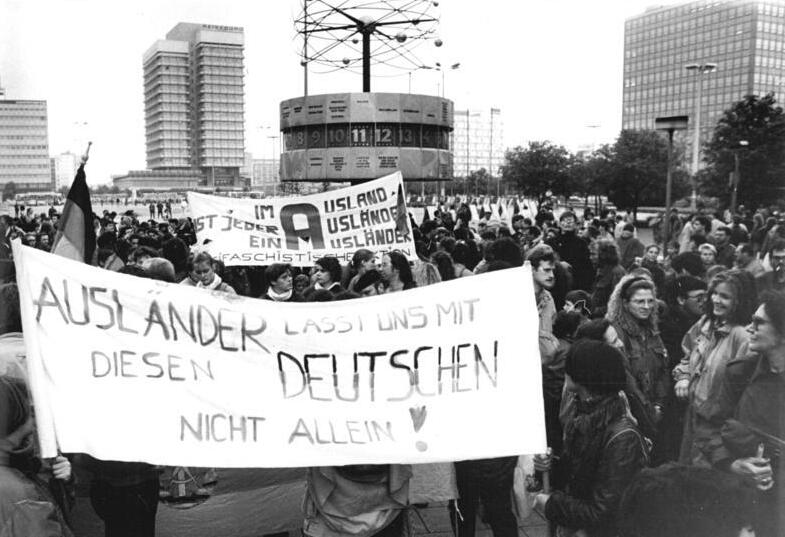
A protest takes place near the clock on 24 April 1990.

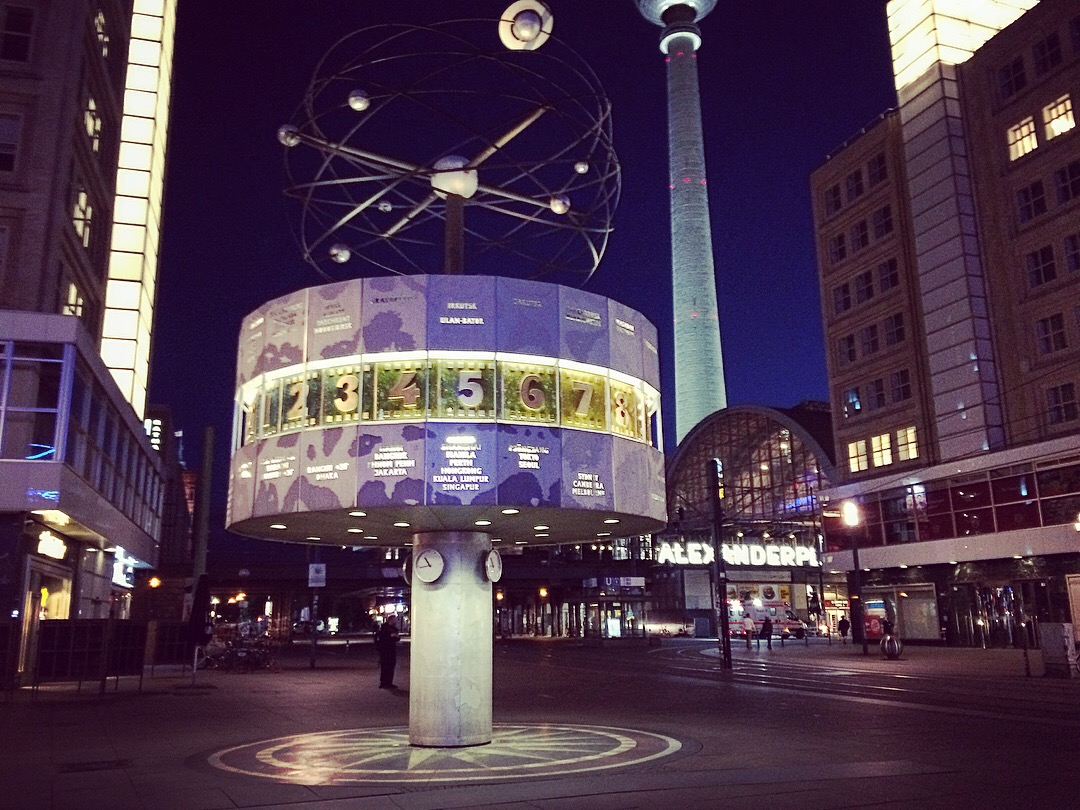
The world time clock by night at Alexanderplatz in Berlin. July 2018.

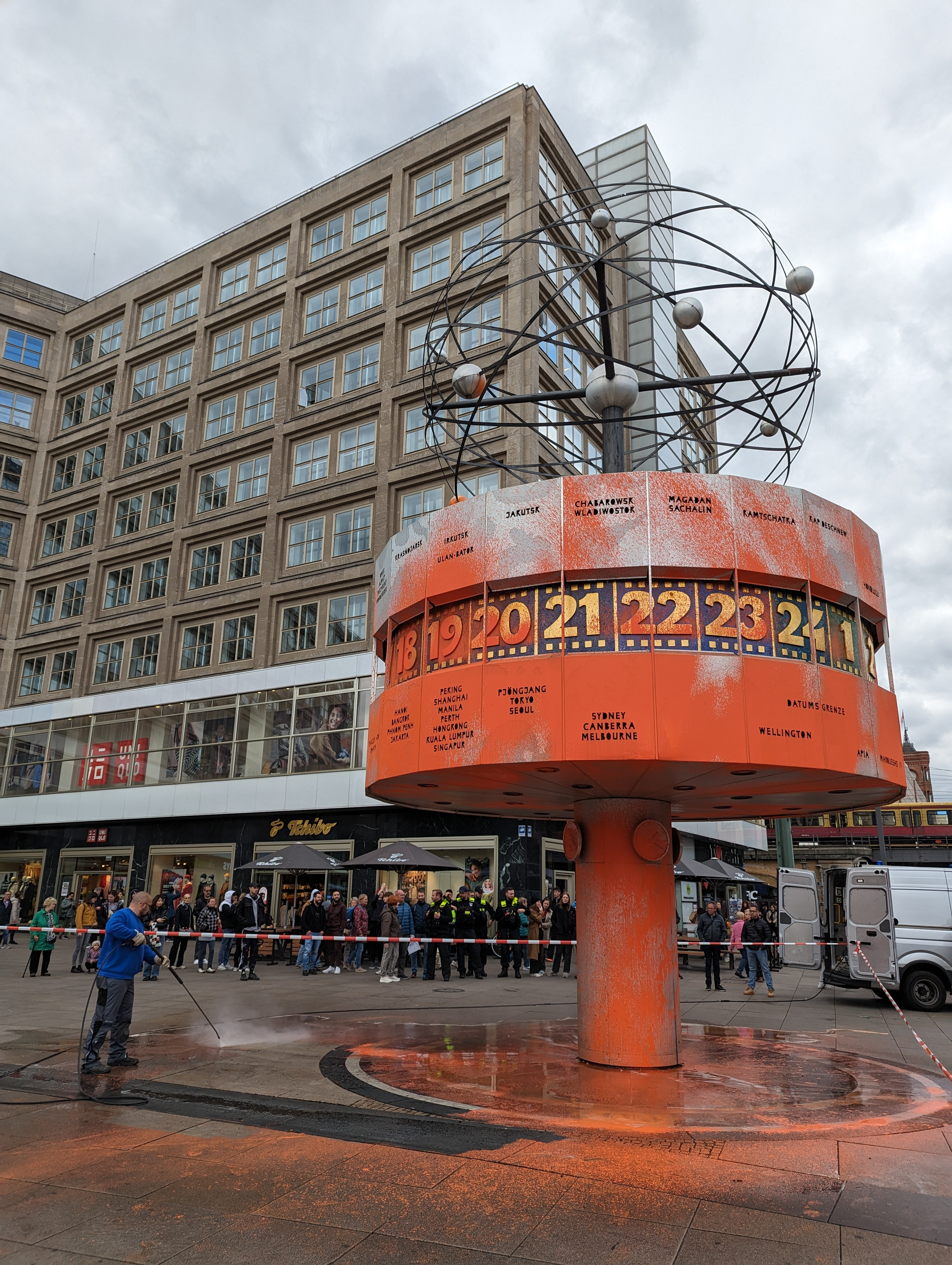
World Clock soiled by Last Generation activists with orange paint on 17 October 2023.
