= Glow-in-the-dark =

Glow-in-the-dark may refer to:

== Science ==
- Bioluminescence, the production and emission of light by a living organism
- Chemiluminescence, the emission of light (luminescence) with limited emission of heat
- Phosphorescence, a specific type of photoluminescence related to fluorescence (as seen in "glow in the dark" toys and materials)
- Radioluminescence, production of luminescence in a material by the bombardment of ionizing radiation

== Music ==
- "Glow in the Dark" (song), a 2014 single by The Wanted
- Glow in the Dark Tour, a 2008 concert tour by Kanye West
- Glow in the Dark (book), a 2009 biographical photo essay about the Kanye West tour
- Glow in the Dark (Buckethead album)
- "Glow in the Dark" (Iggy Pop song)
- "Glow in the Dark" (Skepta song)
- "Glow in the Dark" (Skylar Grey song)
- Glowing in the Dark, a 2021 album by Django Django
- Glow in the Dark, a 2009 live album by Roger Clyne and the Peacemakers
- Glowing in the Dark, an album by Experimental Products
- "Glow in the Dark", a 2025 single by Takanashi Kiara and La+ Darknesss

== See also ==
- Fluorescence, emission of light by a substance that has absorbed light or other electromagnetic radiation
