= World clock =

Clock that displays the times in various locations around the globe

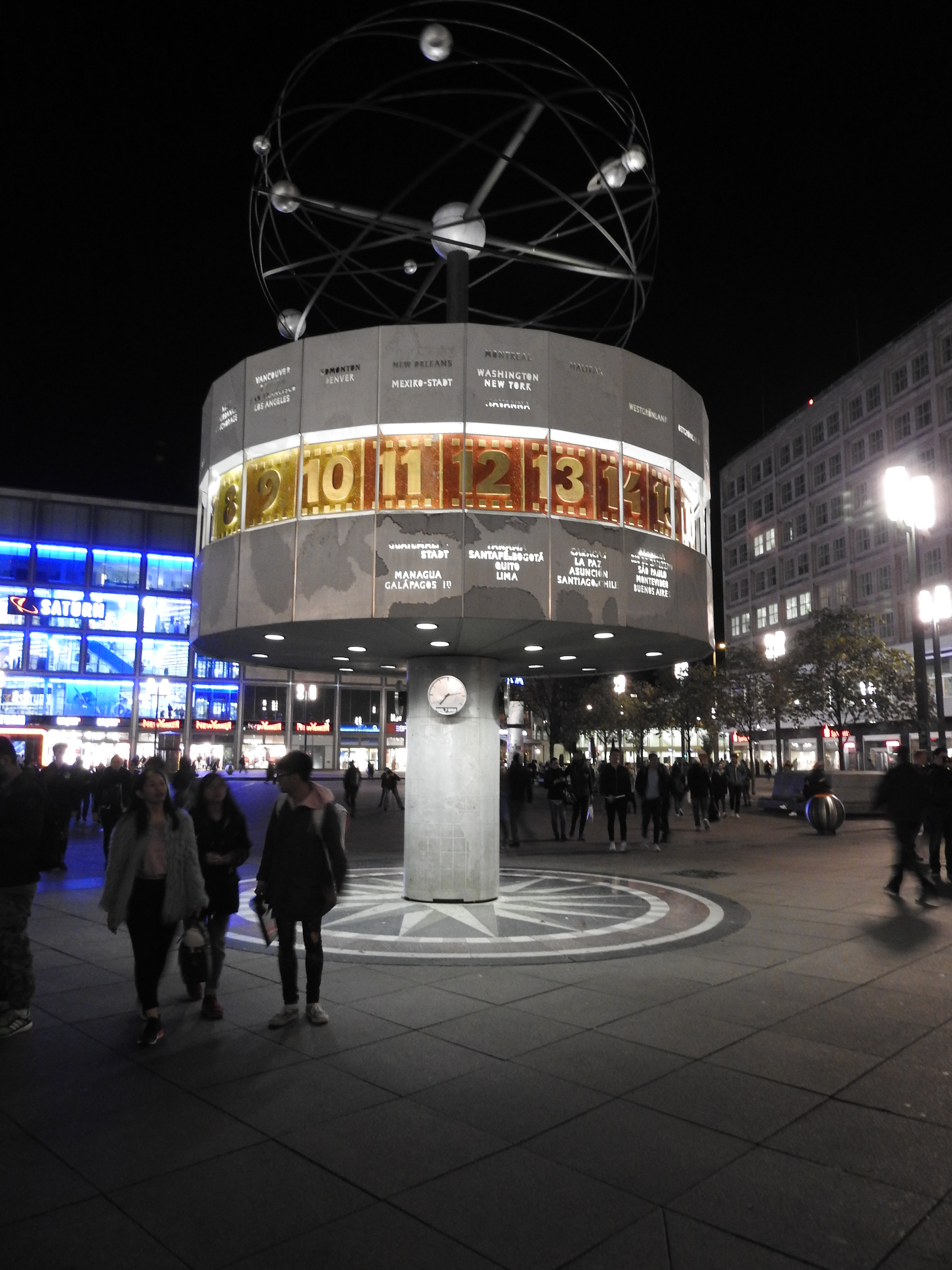
The Weltzeituhr (World Clock) at Alexanderplatz in Berlin

A world clock is a clock which displays the time for various cities around the world. The display can take various forms:

- The clock face can incorporate multiple round analogue clocks with moving hands or multiple digital clocks with numeric readouts, with each clock being labelled with the name of a major city or time zone in the world. The World Clock in Alexanderplatz displays 146 cities in all 24 time zones on its head.
- It could also be a picture map of the world with embedded analogue or digital time-displays.
- A moving circular map of the world, rotating inside a stationary 24-hour dial ring. Alternatively, the disc can be stationary and the ring moving.
- Light projection onto a map representing daytime, used in the Geochron, a brand of a particular form of world clock.

There are also worldtime watches, both wrist watches and pocket watches. Sometime manufacturers of timekeepers erroneously apply the worldtime label to instruments that merely indicate time for two or a few time zones, but the term should be used only for timepieces that indicate time for all major time zones of the globe.

== See also ==
- Manege Square, Moscow
- Time zone
- Jens Olsen's World Clock (actually an astronomical clock)
