= Heavens-Above =

Website for tracking Earth satellites

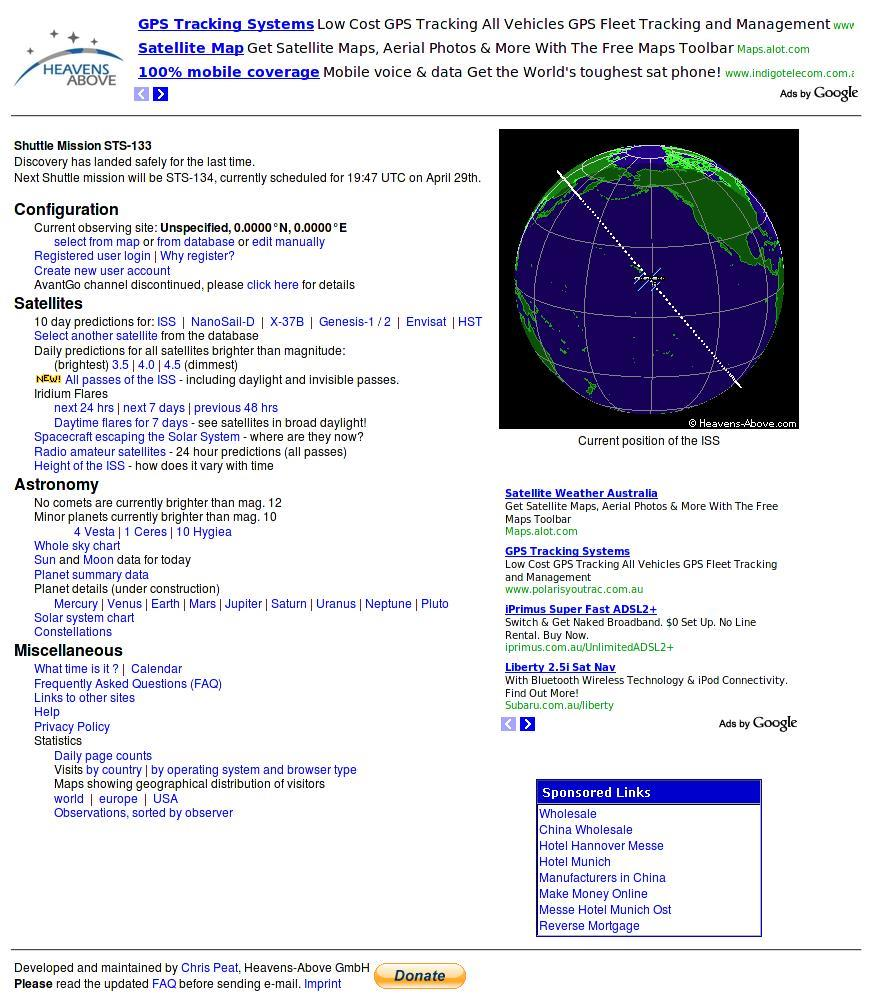
- Heavens-Above home page
- Available in: Multilingual
- Owner: Chris Peat
- Creator: Chris Peat
- Website: heavens-above.com
- Current status: Active

Heavens-Above is a non-profit website developed and maintained by Chris Peat as Heavens-Above GmbH. The web site is dedicated to helping people observe and track satellites orbiting the Earth without the need for optical equipment such as binoculars or telescopes. It provides detailed star charts showing the trajectory of the satellites against the background of the stars as seen during a pass. Special attention is paid to the ISS, Starlink satellites, and others. Space Shuttle missions were tracked until the program was retired in July 2011 and Iridium flares were also tracked until the program was retired in May 2018. The website also offers information on currently visible comets, asteroids, planet details, and other miscellaneous information.

Sky & Telescope magazine described Heavens-Above as "the most popular website for tracking satellites."

Users click on a map of the world to set their viewing location. Lists of objects, their brightness and the time and direction to look to see those objects are given. Space stations, rockets, satellites, space junk as well as Sun, Moon, and planetary data are given.

The authors also offer a freeware mobile app that shows similar information for the user's location.

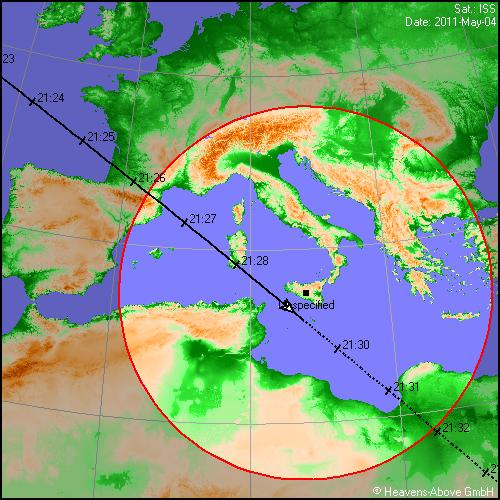
A ground track from Heavens-Above. An observer in Sicily can see the International Space Station when it enters the circle at 9:26 pm. A bright object appears in the northwest, crosses the sky to a point almost overhead, and disappears, in the span of three minutes.

== See also ==
- List of satellite pass predictors
