= Charles A. Beichman =

American astronomer

Charles A.Beichman
- Born: 1952 (age 73–74)
- Occupation: Executive director of the NASA Exoplanet Science Institute
- Years active: 2003–present

Charles Beichman is the current executive director of NASA Exoplanet Science Institute (2003–present), senior faculty associate at California Institute of Technology and an astronomer. In 1975 Beichman received a Master of Science in astronomy from University of Hawaiʻi, In 1976 he received an M.S. in physics from University of Hawaiʻi, and in 1979 he received a PhD in astronomy. He has published numerous papers within his field, including research on exoplanets and Debris disks and is most notably credited with the discovery of a planetary system using IRAS.

Recently, Beichman and collaborators have been studying and publishing papers on the Kuiper Belt, and Spitzer results.
