= Virgin birth =

A virgin birth can refer to:

- Parthenogenesis, birth without fertilization
- Miraculous birth, virgin birth in mythology and religion
  - Virgin birth of Jesus
- Artificial insemination
- Russell case (1920s)
