= CalSky =

Web-based astronomical calculator

CalSky (sky calendar) was a web-based astronomical calculator used by astronomers to plan observing. It was created by Arnold Barmettler, a researcher at the University of Zurich and formerly a scientific assistant at the European Space Agency. The website, available in English and German, featured a calendar (and/or email notifications) generated for your location including information on aurora, comets, tides, solar and lunar eclipses, planets, bright satellite passes (ISS, HST, etc.), occultations, transits, satellite flares, and decaying satellites that may be visible. In October 2020, the original website ceased operations. However, a replacement website is being run by Arnold Barmettler with the URL calsky.io.

== Features ==
- Calendars for the observers location for visible of satellite passes, occultations, conjunctions, eclipses, meteor showers, asteroids, Moon positions (Earth, Jupiter, Saturn), and comets as well as multiple religious calendars.
- Ephemeris, position and visibility charts for Solar System planets plus Pluto
- Visibility of satellites re-entering the Earth's atmosphere

== See also ==
- List of astronomy websites
