= Military power =

Military power may refer to:

- The armed forces of a nation (in a narrow sense) or in the wider sense, the capabilities of a group such as a fire team, squad, etc.
- A great power, in a military context
- Military power (jet engines), the maximum power setting of a military jet aircraft without the use of afterburners
