= Experimental Products =

- Origin: Philadelphia, Pennsylvania, U.S.
- Genres: Electro-pop, Garage, Ambient, Hi-NRG
- Years active: 1982–1987
- Labels: Short Circuit Records, Connection, Vinyl On Demand
- Past members: Mark Wilde; Michael Gross; Mike Simmons; Bill Mutschler

Experimental Products were an American electronic group. Founded in 1982 by Mark Wilde and Michael Gross, they were a Philadelphia-based group.

== Career ==
Experimental Products self-produced the album Prototype in 1982. While it would be their only full album, they released two EPs, Glowing in the Dark in 1984, and Experiment! in 1987. "Glowing" proved a hit with DJs and became a 1985 dance club chart breakthrough. It reached #12 in the midwest, and was the only independent artist in the RockPool 100 for the year.

Today, many DJs and collectors consider it a "classic" synth record. Prototype was one of the most valuable minimal synth records selling for over $500 each on the collectors market in the early 2000s. A very rare flexi-vinyl of "Work the Beat" was included in Philadelphia's Terminal music scene newspaper, produced by the Experimental Products' first manager, Steve Fritz.

During the "Glowing in the Dark" era, Mike Simmons played live as a third keyboardist. He contributed songs played in concert but never officially recorded.

A rough cut video for "Glowing in the Dark" was shot at the Kennel Club, and can be found on YouTube with over 350,000 views across 2 posts . An entire show at City Gardens was videotaped with a single locked camera (just to document). A "hand-synched" video with Wilde, Gross, and Mutschler on electric trumpet, an early version of "Work the Beat", was recorded as a video course project.

Visualist for the band, Mutschler, created elaborate live slide shows. These were summarized in a video, "All We Can Not See We Call Invisible" (a lyric from the Buggles), which was awarded a bronze medal at the 1985 International Film and TV Festival in New York City. He left Experimental Products around 1986. Al Jourgenson invited him to tour with a Ministry supergroup with Luk van Acker, Jah Jobble, and Einstürzende Neubauten that did not come to fruition. The subsequent scaled back tour ran into a technical issue mid-run, and Al sought to borrow a piece of gear. Trent Reznor, its owner, would not lend it unless he was a made a tour tech.

The group grew to 4-6 members after co-founder Mark Wilde died in 1987 from pneumonia. Gross carried on with different members, selling out the 2000 capacity Pulsations Philadelphia area nightclub, in one of their occasional live performances. After Wilde's death they had no further releases, although two compilation albums have been released by Vinyl On Demand. Vinyl On Demand also reissued the album Prototype as a double LP with bonus tracks in 2008. Mutschler provided some of the live and other bonus live and rehearsal tapes, including an early version of "Glowing".

In 1990, Gross and Mutschler formed a short lived performance duo, Experimental Cafe, which played in Philadelphia clubs. An excerpt is on YouTube. Gross had new instrumental material and adaptations of original Experimental Products material. Mutschler utilized early Macintosh video capabilities mixed with found and treated video edits - including color and image distortions.

"Glowing in the Dark" had re-releases and re-mixes affiliated with DJ Hell in Germany throughout the early 2000s.

Michael Gross died in 2016, some time after relocating to Washington state.

The final lead singer, (also named Michael), has been doing one-man shows on the East Coast, and is working towards a touring band.

Mutschler produced Patrick Moraz's live PM in Princeton video/DVD and CD in 1995. It has been re-released by VoicePrint UK, and iTunes. Mutschler started recording music as Northern Lights eXperience in 2005. "Atmosphere" was released in 2012. Moraz noted it as "high quality sounds. Interesting, different, original". Mutschler released "Fields" as NL-X in December, 2019, on major streaming outlets. It can also be listened to at nl-x.hearnow.com. Mutschler's fourth CD "soundtracks" was released in August 2021. Mutschler is working on an updated "Love Changes" and "Aviation" for a fifth release in 2023 of driving electronic sequences, and chill-ambient. Those two tracks might be produced with the band's previously mentioned final lead singer.

== Discography ==
- Prototype LP (1982)
- Glowing in the Dark EP
- Experiment EP
- Glowing in the Dark via DJ Hell CD Hellboys (2007). International Deejay Gigolo Records, Berlin, Germany.
