= NASA Exoplanet Science Institute =

Research institute

NASA Exoplanet Science Institute (NExScI)
- Website type: Astronomy
- Creator: Operated for NASA at Caltech
- Website: https://nexsci.caltech.edu/
- Current status: Active

The NASA Exoplanet Science Institute (NExScI) is part of the Infrared Processing and Analysis Center (IPAC) and is on the campus of the California Institute of Technology (Caltech) in Pasadena, CA. NExScI was formerly known as the Michelson Science Center and before that as the Interferometry Science Center. It was renamed NExScI in the Fall of 2008 to reflect NASA's growing interest in the search for planets outside of the Solar System, also known as exoplanets. The executive director of NExScI is Charles A. Beichman.

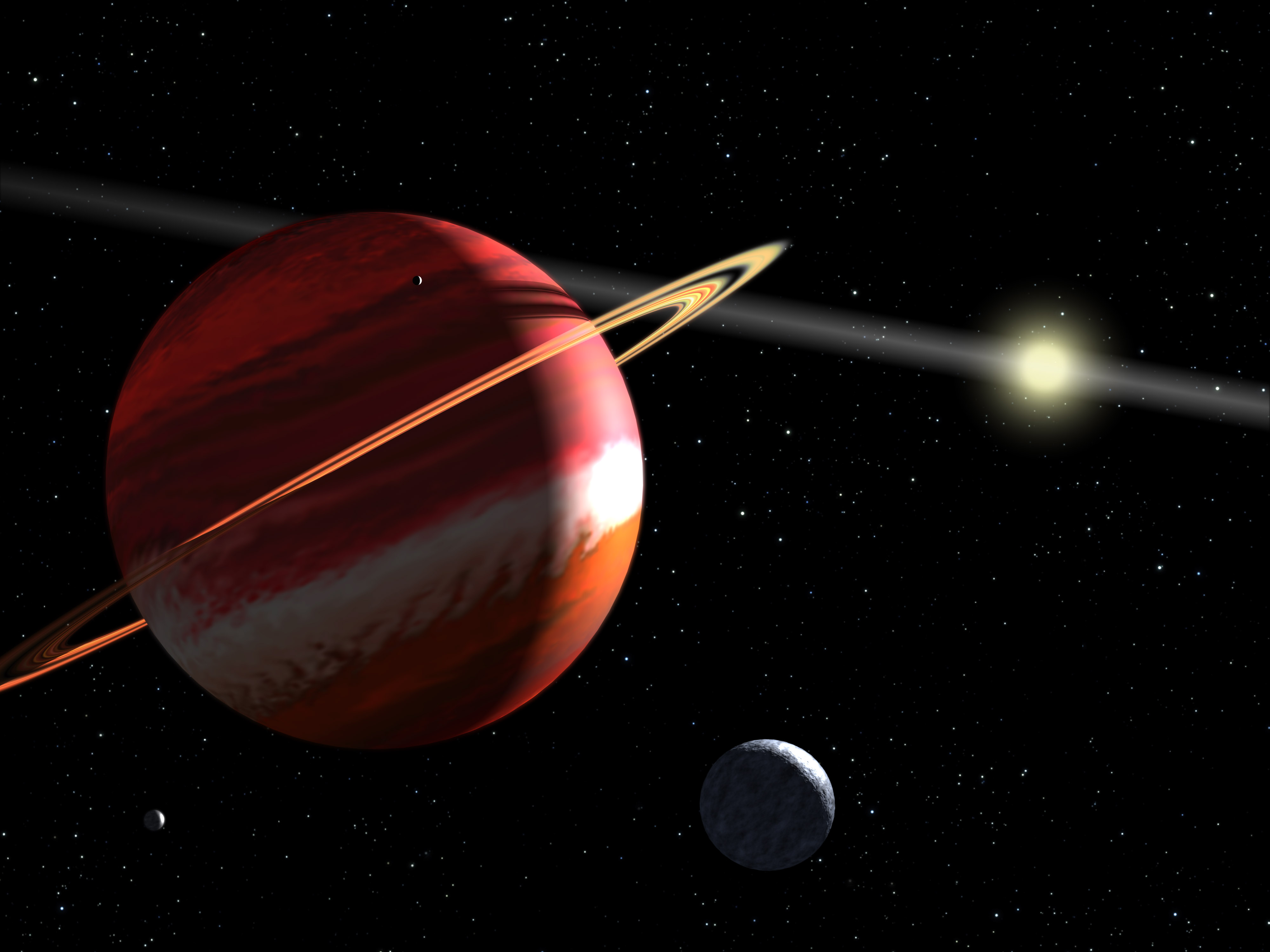
An artist's concept of a Jupiter-mass planet orbiting the nearby star Epsilon Eridani.

NExScI is the science, operations, and analysis service organization for the NASA Exoplanet Exploration Program and the scientists and engineers that use them. NExScI facilitates the timely and successful execution of exoplanet science by providing software infrastructure, science operations, and consulting to Exoplanet Exploration Program projects and their user communities.

The activities and programs that NExScI oversees and manages are described in more detail in this article.

== Sagan Exoplanet Program ==
The Sagan Program is administered for the Exoplanet Exploration Program by NExScI, and it includes both the Sagan Fellowship Program and the Sagan Exoplanet Summer Workshop. The Sagan Fellowships are one of three themed postdoctoral fellowships that are part of the Astrophysics Science Directorate. The Sagan Fellowships support Exoplanet research, and are joined by two other NASA astrophysics theme-based fellowship programs: the Einstein Fellowship Program which supports Physics of the Cosmos research, and the Hubble Fellowship Program which supports Cosmic Origins research. Applications to the Sagan Postdoctoral Program are accepted in the Fall of each year with typically 5-7 offers made by the following February. The fellowships are for three years with annual renewal contingent upon performance and funding.

Summer Workshops are also part of the Sagan Exoplanet Program and offer a chance to graduate students and postdocs to explore an exoplanet-related topic in depth. The workshops have been offered since 1999 (prior to 2009 they were known as the Michelson Summer Workshops). Recent topics of the summer workshops are Stars as Homes for Habitable Planets, Exoplanetary Atmospheres and Microlensing.

== Astronomical data archives ==
NExScI maintains several astronomical data archives for use by the science community. The two largest are the NASA Exoplanet Archive and the Keck Observatory Archive (KOA).

=== NASA Exoplanet Archive ===
Funded by NASA, the NASA Exoplanet Archive serves the user community working with exoplanet data, primarily by serving transit data sets from Kepler mission and COnvection ROtation and planetary Transits (CoRoT) and providing long-term data curation and analysis tools. The archive content includes exoplanet and stellar host properties and Kepler candidate properties in interactive tables and time series data from space- and ground-based projects. Analysis tools include visualizations, periodogram calculations, and transit ephemeris predictions. The new service is available at exoplanetarchive.ipac.caltech.edu.

=== Keck Observatory Archive ===
The Keck Observatory Archive (KOA) is a NASA-funded collaboration between the NASA Exoplanet Science Institute (NExScI) and the W. M. Keck Observatory (WMKO). The KOA archive includes data from two of the instruments on the Keck telescopes, the High Resolution Echelle Spectrograph (HIRES) and the Near InfraRed echelle SPECtrograph (NIRSPEC). KOA first released archived HIRES data on August 18, 2004 and the data extend back to 1994. The NIRSPEC data were first released on May 17, 2010 and extend back to 1999.

Public access to these data is governed by the data release policy agreed to between NASA and the Keck partner institutions. Observations supporting Deep Impact and GRB051111, a gamma ray burst observed on November 11, 2005, may be accessed from dedicated download pages, as well as through the KOA user interface.

== NASA Keck time administration ==
The two 10-meter aperture Keck telescopes are located on the dormant Mauna Kea volcano on the island of Hawaii. They are operated for the California Association for Research in Astronomy (CARA), the University of Hawaii (UH), and NASA by the William M. Keck Observatory (WMKO) in Waimea, HI.

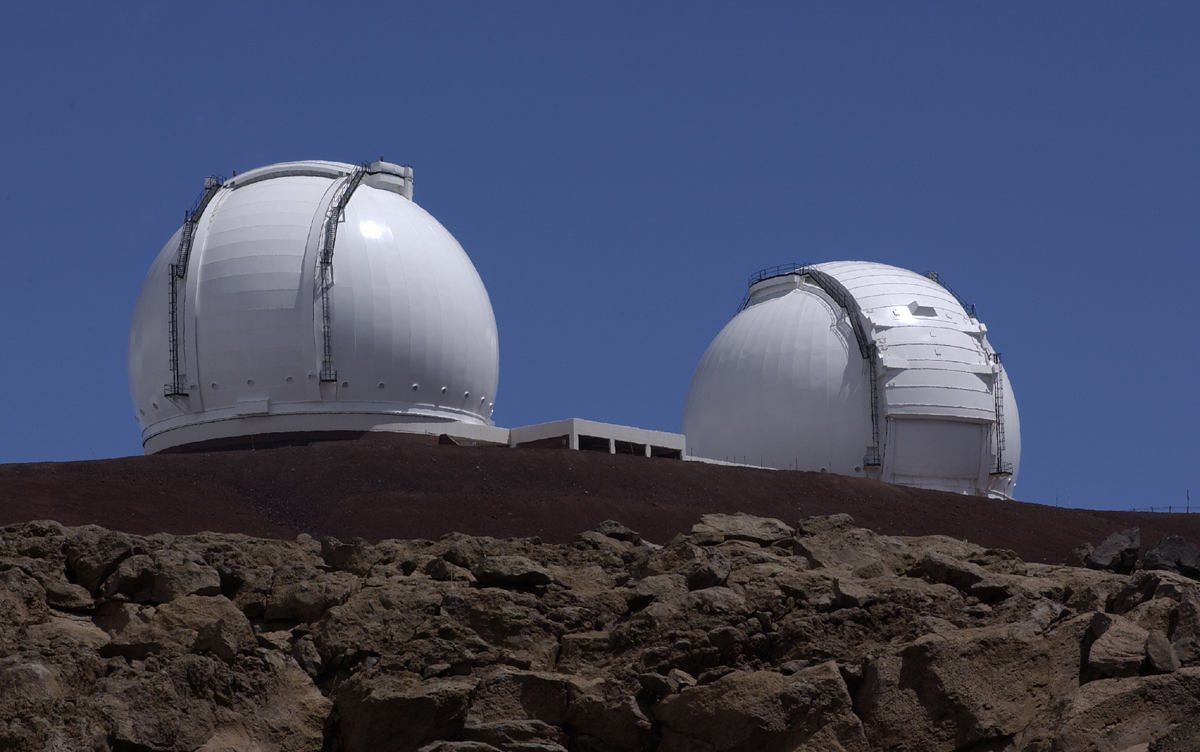
The two 10-meter Keck telescopes on Mauna Kea, Hawaii.

As a partner in the Keck telescopes, NASA receives 1/6th of the time available each year for astronomical observations. The proposal solicitation, selection, and scheduling is managed for NASA by NExScI, with calls for proposals issued twice each year (with due dates in September and March) for the two observing semesters on the telescopes. Proposals are evaluated on their scientific content as well as their tie to NASA's strategic and mission support goals.

== Support of ground-based observatories ==
=== Keck Interferometer ===
The Keck Interferometer (KI) connects the two 10-meter Keck telescopes as an infrared interferometer with a baseline of 85 meters. This project was funded by NASA and developed by the Jet Propulsion Laboratory, the W.M. Keck Observatory and NExScI. KI included the visibility amplitude and nulling modes as well as a more recently developed astrometric mode.

During KI operations, scientists at NExScI provided support to plan and conduct observations. NExScI has also developed various software tools to model and plan interferometric observations and to calibrate KI data. Following observing semester 2012A (ending on July 31, 2012), the Keck Interferometer will no longer be available for use. However the data archive and software tools are still available and can be accessed through the NExScI's KI support page.

=== Large Binocular Telescope Interferometer (LBTI) ===
The Large Binocular Telescope Interferometer (LBTI) is installed on the Large Binocular Telescope on Mt. Graham, Arizona. LBTI is designed to explore the regions surrounding nearby star systems for dust and planets and provide super resolution imaging in the mid-infrared.

LBTI science operations are expected to start in early 2013 and NExScI will provide the data archive for LBTI and serve as the support center for Guest Investigators using NASA time on the instrument.

=== Palomar Testbed Interferometer ===
The Palomar Testbed Interferometer (PTI) was a near-IR, long-baseline stellar interferometer located at Palomar Observatory in north San Diego County. It was developed to demonstrate the utility of ground-based differential astrometry in the search for planets around nearby stars, and to develop key technologies for the Keck Interferometer and space-based missions. PTI is no longer an operating facility, but previously collected data can be accessed through the PTI archive.

PTI's dual-star tracking system, the first and (still) only of its kind, simultaneously tracks interference fringes from a target star and a reference star against which the target is measured.

PTI has also been used to measure the sizes of dwarf, giant, and supergiant stars; the sizes of emissive regions around young stellar objects; and binary star orbits. It is the first interferometer to have directly measured the diameter changes of a Cepheid variable star, and directly measured the rotational oblateness of a rapidly rotating star.

NExScI personnel were instrumental in the development and scientific accomplishments of PTI, and are largely responsible for its data infrastructure and science planning and processing applications.

== Support of space-based observatories ==
=== Kepler Mission Science and Analysis System (KSAS) ===
NExScI scientists and programmers have had the lead role in developing the Science Analysis System for the Kepler Mission. KSAS the software system used by the Kepler Science Team to collect all mission and follow-up data on planet candidates, manage the follow-up observing and produce mission results catalogs. KSAS also facilitates identification of planet candidates and helps the Kepler science team prioritize these candidates for follow-up ground observations. NExScI also developed the follow-up observation program server as part of this effort. In the coming years, the tools developed for KSAS will be applied to other transit datasets.

== Science research at NExScI ==
Astronomers at NExScI are involved in a variety of projects, conducting science research using ground and space-based observatories and also figuring out how to best manage the vast amounts of astronomical data and make it available to the wider public.
