= Infrared Processing and Analysis Center =

NASA science center at Caltech in the US

The Infrared Processing and Analysis Center (IPAC) provides science operations, data management, data archives and community support for astronomy and planetary science missions. IPAC has a historical emphasis on infrared-submillimeter astronomy and exoplanet science. IPAC has supported NASA, NSF and privately funded projects and missions. It is located on the campus of the California Institute of Technology in Pasadena, California.

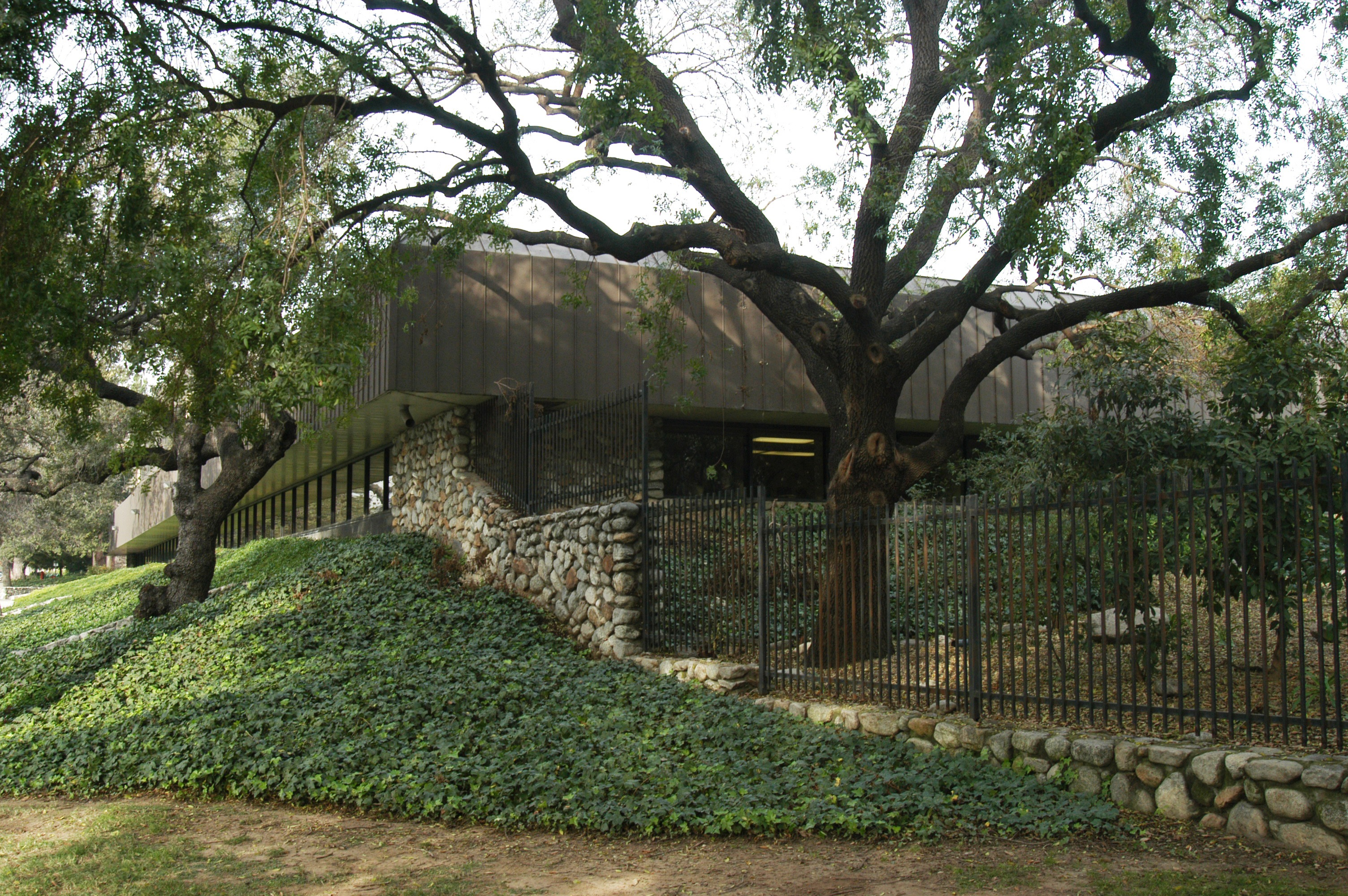
IPAC headquarters at Caltech

IPAC was established in 1986 to provide support for the joint European-American orbiting infrared telescope, the Infrared Astronomical Satellite, or IRAS. The IRAS mission performed an unbiased, sensitive all-sky survey at 12, 25, 60 and 100 μm during 1983. After the mission ended, IPAC started the Infrared Science Archive (IRSA) to make the data available to anyone who needed it.

Later, NASA designated IPAC as the U.S. science support center for the European Infrared Space Observatory (ISO), which ceased operations in 1998. About that same time, IPAC was designated as the science center for the Space Infrared Telescope Facility (SIRTF) -- renamed the Spitzer Space Telescope after launch. IPAC also assumed the lead role in various other infrared space missions, including the Wide-field Infrared Explorer (WIRE) and the Midcourse Space Experiment (MSX). IPAC also expanded its support to include ground-based missions with the assumption of science support responsibilities for the Two-Micron All-Sky Survey (2MASS), a near-infrared survey of the entire sky conducted by twin observatories in the Northern and Southern hemispheres.

In 1999, IPAC formed an interferometry science center, originally called the Michelson Science Center (MSC) after interferometry pioneer Albert A. Michelson. MSC was renamed the NASA Exoplanet Science Institute (NExScI) in 2008.

Today, the greater IPAC includes the Spitzer Science Center, the NASA Exoplanet Science Institute and the NASA Herschel Science Center. In 2014, NASA established the Euclid NASA Science Center at IPAC (ENSCI) in order to support US-based investigations using Euclid data. The combined efforts of these centers support more than a dozen science missions and archives. IPAC is also a participating organization in the Virtual Astronomical Observatory (VAO).
