= Encyclopaedia of Exoplanetary Systems =

Astronomical database

- Home page, as seen on December 14, 2023
- Website type: Astronomy
- Owner: Paris Observatory
- Creator: Jean Schneider
- Website: exoplanet.eu
- Registration: none
- Launched: February 1995
- Current status: Active
- Content license: CC-BY 4.0

The Encyclopaedia of Exoplanetary Systems (also known as Extrasolar Planets Encyclopaedia and Catalogue of Exoplanets) is an astronomy website, founded in Paris, France at the Meudon Observatory by Jean Schneider in February 1995, which maintains a database of all the currently known and candidate extrasolar planets, with individual pages for each planet and a full list interactive catalog spreadsheet. The main catalogue comprises databases of all of the currently confirmed extrasolar planets as well as a database of unconfirmed planet detections. The databases are frequently updated with new data from peer-reviewed publications and conferences.

In their respective pages, the planets are listed along with their basic properties, including the year of planet's discovery, mass, radius, orbital period, semi-major axis, eccentricity, inclination, longitude of periastron, time of periastron, maximum time variation, and time of transit, including all error range values.

The individual planet data pages also contain the data on the parent star, including name, distance in parsecs, spectral type, effective temperature, apparent magnitude, mass, radius, age, and celestial coordinates (Right Ascension and Declination). Even when they are known, not all of these figures are listed in the interactive spreadsheet catalog, and many missing planet figures that would simply require the application of Kepler's third law of motion are left blank. Most notably absent on all pages is a star's luminosity.

As of June 2011, the catalog includes objects up to 25 Jupiter masses, an increase on the previous inclusion criteria of 20 Jupiter masses. As of 2016 this limit was increased to 60 Jupiter masses based on a study of mass–density relationships.

== See also ==
- NASA Exoplanet Archive
- Exoplanet Data Explorer
