= Exoplanet Data Explorer =

Database of exoplanets

Exoplanet Data Explorer / Exoplanet Orbit Database
- Website type: Astronomy
- Creators: Jason T. Wright, Geoff Marcy, and the California Planet Survey consortium. Website design and maintenance by Onsi Fakhouri
- Website: http://exoplanets.org
- Current status: Inactive

The Exoplanet Data Explorer / Exoplanet Orbit Database is a database listing extrasolar planets up to 24 Jupiter masses. It is no longer actively maintained.

== Overview ==
"We have retained the generous upper mass limit of 24 Jupiter masses in our definition of a “planet”, for the same reasons as in the Catalog: at the moment, any mass limit is arbitrary and will serve little practical function both because of the sin i ambiguity in radial velocity masses and because of the lack of physical motivation.

The 13 Jupiter-mass distinction by the IAU Working Group is physically unmotivated for planets with rocky cores, and observationally problematic due to the sin i ambiguity. A useful theoretical and rhetorical distinction is to segregate brown dwarfs from planets by their formation mechanism, but such a distinction is of little utility observationally."

The database was updated to include new exoplanets and possible exoplanets, using data from other archives such as the Astrophysics Data System, arXiv and the NASA Exoplanet Archive. The database stopped being updated in mid-2018 and is no longer actively maintained.

== See also ==
- Extrasolar Planets Encyclopaedia
- NASA Exoplanet Archive
- Exoplanet
- List of Exoplanets
