= List of accolades received by Avatar =

Avatar accolades
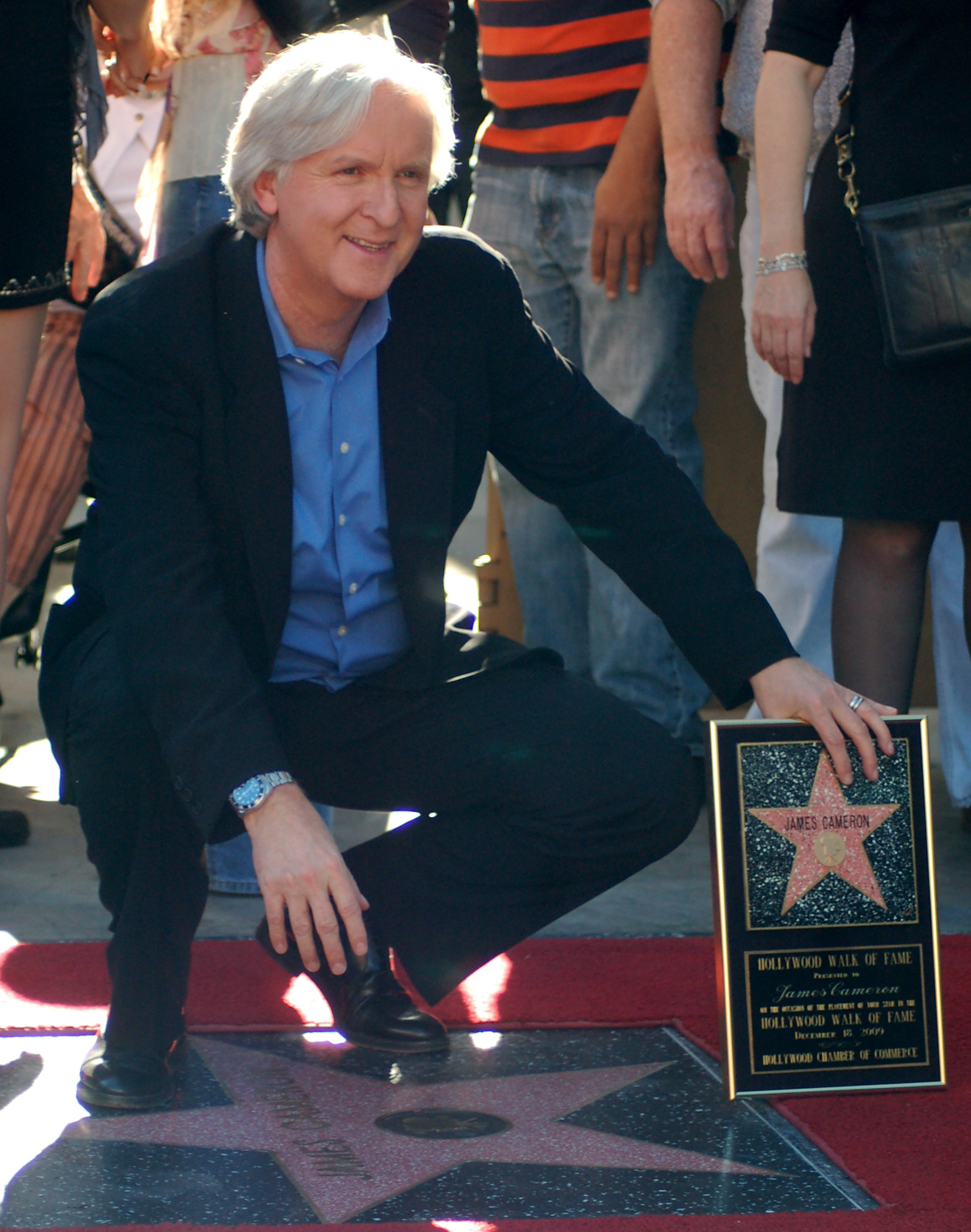
- James Cameron received multiple awards and nominations for his directing of the film.
Awards and nominations
Award	Wins	Nominations
3D Creative Arts Awards	6	6
Academy Awards	3	9
American Society of Cinematographers	0	1
Art Directors Guild Awards	1	1
Artios Awards	0	1
Austin Film Critics Association	1	1
Black Reel Awards	0	1
British Academy Film Awards	2	8
César Award	0	1
Cinema Audio Society Awards	0	1
Cinema of Brazil	1	1
Chicago Film Critics Association	0	2
Costume Designers Guild	0	1
Critics' Choice Movie Awards	6	9
Dallas-Fort Worth Film Critics Association Award	1	1
Directors Guild of America Awards	0	1
Eddie Awards	0	1
Empire Awards	3	5
Environmental Media Awards	1	1
Florida Film Critics Circle Award	1	1
Golden Eagle Award	1	1
Golden Globe Awards	2	4
Golden Reel Awards	2	3
Grammy Awards	0	2
Hollywood Post Alliance Awards	1	1
Houston Film Critics Society	0	4
Hugo Awards	0	1
International Film Music Critics Association Awards	0	4
Irish Film and Television Awards	0	1
Italian National Syndicate of Film Journalists	1	1
Japan Academy Prize	1	1
London Film Critics' Circle	0	2
MTV Movie Awards	0	5
NAACP Image Awards	0	1
National Movie Awards	0	1
National Society of Film Critics	0	1
New York Film Critics	2	2
Nickelodeon Kids' Choice Awards	0	2
Hugo Awards	0	1
Online Film Critics Society	0	2
Nickelodeon Kids' Choice Awards	0	2
People's Choice Awards	2	2
Producers Guild of America Awards	0	1
Proggy award	1	1
San Diego Film Critics Society	0	2
Santa Barbara International Film Festival	1	1
Saturn Awards	11	11
Scream Awards	3	9
St. Louis Gateway Film Critics Association	2	2
Teen Choice Awards	3	6
Visual Effects Society	7	12
World Soundtrack Awards	0	2
Writers Guild of America Awards	0	1

Totals (Note: Certain award groups do not simply award one winner. They acknowledge several different recipients, have runners-up, and have third place. Since this is a specific recognition and is different from losing an award, runner-up mentions are considered wins in this award tally. For simplification and to avoid errors, each award in this list has been presumed to have had a prior nomination.)
- Wins: 66
- Nominations: 145

Avatar is a 2009 epic science fiction film written and directed by James Cameron. Produced by Lightstorm Entertainment, Dune Entertainment, and Ingenious Film Partners, and distributed by 20th Century Fox, the film stars Sam Worthington, Zoe Saldaña, Stephen Lang, Michelle Rodriguez, and Sigourney Weaver. Avatar premiered in London on December 10, and was released in the United States on December 18. Made on a production budget of $237 million, Avatar grossed $2.923 billion, breaking numerous box office records, including becoming the highest-grossing film of all time and the first film to gross $2 billion. On the review aggregator website Rotten Tomatoes, the film holds an approval rating of 81% based on 335 reviews.

Avatar won the 82nd Academy Awards for Best Art Direction, Best Cinematography, and Best Visual Effects, and was nominated for a total of nine, including Best Picture and Best Director. The film garnered four nominations at the 67th Golden Globe Awards ceremony, and received two awards for Best Film – Drama and Best Director. Avatar was nominated for eight British Academy Film Awards, winning Best Production Design and Best Special Visual Effects. The film's achievement in visual effects were praised by the Visual Effects Society, who honored it with six accolades during their annual awards ceremony. Avatar was also nominated for the Directors Guild of America Awards, the Producers Guild of America Awards, and the Writers Guild of America Awards. The film was nominated for ten Saturn Awards and it went on to win all ten at the 36th Saturn Awards ceremony. Zoe Saldana's win for the Saturn Award for Best Actress marked a rare occurrence for an all-CG character.

Avatar received recognition from numerous North American critics' associations. The film garnered nine nominations for the Critics' Choice Awards of the Broadcast Film Critics Association where it won Best Action Film and several technical categories. The Austin Film Critics Association and the Dallas-Fort Worth Film Critics Association placed the film on their lists of the year's top ten films. Phoenix Film Critics Society honored the film with Best Cinematography, Best Film Editing, Best Production Design and Best Visual Effect awards and also included it on its top ten films of the year list. It won two of the St. Louis Gateway Film Critics Association awards for Best Visual Effects and Most Original, Innovative or Creative Film, and the New York Film Critics Online honored the film with its Best Picture award.

In December 2009, the American Film Institute recognized the film and Cameron's advances in CGI effects with their yearly "AFI Moments of Significance" award claiming it "will have profound effects on the future of the art form". In January 2010, it was announced that the Southern Sky Column, a 3,544-foot (1,080 m) quartz-sandstone mountain in the Zhangjiajie National Forest Park in Zhangjiajie, Hunan, China, had been renamed "Avatar Hallelujah Mountain" (阿凡达-哈利路亚山) by the city government in honor of the film.

== Accolades ==
Accolades received by Avatar (2009 film)
Award / Film festival	Date of ceremony	Category	Recipient(s)	Result	Ref.
3D Creative Arts Awards	February 23, 2010	Live Action 3D Feature	Avatar	Won	
3D Creative Arts Awards	February 23, 2010	Best 3D Character	Neytiri	Won	
3D Creative Arts Awards	February 23, 2010	Best 3D Scene	Jake Sully's first flight	Won	
3D Creative Arts Awards	February 23, 2010	Best 3D Stereography / Live Action	Avatar	Won	
3D Creative Arts Awards	February 23, 2010	Outstanding Achievement in 3D Visual Effects	Avatar	Won	
3D Creative Arts Awards	February 23, 2010	Outstanding Achievement for Marketing 3D Content / Live Action	Avatar	Won	
Academy Awards	March 7, 2010	Best Picture	James Cameron and Jon Landau	Nominated	
Academy Awards	March 7, 2010	Best Director	James Cameron	Nominated	
Academy Awards	March 7, 2010	Best Art Direction	Art Direction: Rick Carter and Robert Stromberg; Set Decoration: Kim Sinclair	Won	
Academy Awards	March 7, 2010	Best Cinematography	Mauro Fiore	Won	
Academy Awards	March 7, 2010	Best Film Editing	Stephen Rivkin, John Refoua, and James Cameron	Nominated	
Academy Awards	March 7, 2010	Best Original Score	James Horner	Nominated	
Academy Awards	March 7, 2010	Best Sound Editing	Christopher Boyes and Gwendolyn Yates Whittle	Nominated	
Academy Awards	March 7, 2010	Best Sound Mixing	Christopher Boyes, Gary Summers, Andy Nelson, and Tony Johnson	Nominated	
Academy Awards	March 7, 2010	Best Visual Effects	Joe Letteri, Stephen Rosenbaum, Richard Baneham, and Andrew R. Jones	Won	
American Society of Cinematographers	February 27, 2010	Outstanding Achievement in Theatrical Releases	Mauro Fiore	Nominated	
Art Directors Guild Awards	February 13, 2010	Excellence in Production Design for a Fantasy Film	Rick Carter and Robert Stromberg	Won	
Artios Awards	November 1, 2010	Big Budget Feature – Drama	Margery Simkin and Mali Finn	Nominated	
Austin Film Critics Association	December 15, 2009	Top 10 Films	James Cameron and Jon Landau	Won	
British Academy Film Awards	February 21, 2010	Best Film	James Cameron and Jon Landau	Nominated	
British Academy Film Awards	February 21, 2010	Best Director	James Cameron	Nominated	
British Academy Film Awards	February 21, 2010	Best Music	James Horner	Nominated	
British Academy Film Awards	February 21, 2010	Best Cinematography	Mauro Fiore	Nominated	
British Academy Film Awards	February 21, 2010	Best Editing	Stephen Rivkin, John Refoua, and James Cameron	Nominated	
British Academy Film Awards	February 21, 2010	Best Production Design	Rick Carter, Robert Stromberg, and Kim Sinclair	Won	
British Academy Film Awards	February 21, 2010	Best Sound	Christopher Boyes, Gary Summers, Andy Nelson, Tony Johnson, and Addison Teague	Nominated	
British Academy Film Awards	February 21, 2010	Best Special Visual Effects	Joe Letteri, Stephen Rosenbaum, Richard Baneham, and Andrew Jones	Won	
Black Reel Awards	February 12, 2010	Best Supporting Actress	Zoe Saldana	Nominated	
Brazilian Film Academy	June 8, 2010	Best Foreign Film	Avatar	Won	
César Awards	February 27, 2010	Best Foreign Film	James Cameron and Jon Landau	Nominated	
Chicago Film Critics Association	December 21, 2009	Best Cinematography	Mauro Fiore	Nominated	
Chicago Film Critics Association	December 21, 2009	Best Original Score	James Horner	Nominated	
Cinema Audio Society Awards	February 27, 2010	Outstanding Achievement in Sound Mixing	Tony Johnson, Chris Boyes, Gary Summers, and Andy Nelson	Nominated	
Costume Designers Guild Awards	February 25, 2010	Excellence in Fantasy Film	Mayes Rubeo and Deborah Lynn Scott	Nominated	
Critics' Choice Movie Awards	January 15, 2010	Best Action Movie	James Cameron and Jon Landau	Won	
Critics' Choice Movie Awards	January 15, 2010	Best Art Direction	Rick Carter and Robert Stromberg	Won	
Critics' Choice Movie Awards	January 15, 2010	Best Cinematography	Mauro Fiore	Won	
Critics' Choice Movie Awards	January 15, 2010	Best Directing	James Cameron	Nominated	
Critics' Choice Movie Awards	January 15, 2010	Best Editing	James Cameron, John Refoua, and Stephen Rivkin	Won	
Critics' Choice Movie Awards	January 15, 2010	Best Picture	James Cameron and Jon Landau	Nominated	
Critics' Choice Movie Awards	January 15, 2010	Best Makeup	Avatar	Nominated	
Critics' Choice Movie Awards	January 15, 2010	Best Sound	Christopher Boyes, Gary Summers, Andy Nelson, Tony Johnson, and Addison Teague	Won	
Critics' Choice Movie Awards	January 15, 2010	Best Visual Effects	Joe Letteri, Stephen Rosenbaum, Richard Baneham, and Andy Jones	Won	
Dallas-Fort Worth Film Critics Association	December 16, 2009	Top 10 Films	James Cameron and Jon Landau	Won	
Directors Guild of America Awards	January 30, 2010	Outstanding Directing – Feature Film	James Cameron	Nominated	
Eddie Awards	February 14, 2010	Best Edited Feature Film – Dramatic	James Cameron, John Refua, and Stephen Rivkin	Nominated	
Empire Awards	March 28, 2010	Best Film	James Cameron and Jon Landau	Won	
Empire Awards	March 28, 2010	Best Sci-Fi / Fantasy	James Cameron and Jon Landau	Nominated	
Empire Awards	March 28, 2010	Best Actor	Sam Worthington	Nominated	
Empire Awards	March 28, 2010	Best Actress	Zoe Saldana	Won	
Empire Awards	March 28, 2010	Best Director	James Cameron	Won	
Environmental Media Awards	October 17, 2010	Feature Film	Avatar	Won	
Florida Film Critics Circle	December 21, 2009	Best Cinematography	Mauro Fiore	Won	
Golden Eagle Award	January 21, 2011	Best Foreign Language Film	Avatar	Won	
Golden Globe Awards	January 17, 2010	Best Director	James Cameron	Won	
Golden Globe Awards	January 17, 2010	Best Film – Drama	Avatar	Won	
Golden Globe Awards	January 17, 2010	Best Original Score	James Horner	Nominated	
Golden Globe Awards	January 17, 2010	Best Original Song	James Horner, Simon Franglen, and Kuk Harrell for "I See You (Theme from Avatar)"	Nominated	
Golden Reel Awards	February 20, 2010	Best Sound Editing – Best Sound Editing: Music in a Feature Film	Jim Henrikson, Dick Bernstein, and Michael Bauer	Won	
Golden Reel Awards	February 20, 2010	Best Sound Editing – Best Sound Editing: Dialogue and ADR in a Feature Film	Gwendolyn Yates Whittle, Kim Foscato, Cheryl Nardi, Marshall Winn, Petra Bach, Richard Hymns, Stuart McCowan, and Steve Slanec	Nominated	
Golden Reel Awards	February 20, 2010	Best Sound Editing – Best Sound Editing: Sound Effects and Foley in a Feature Film	Addison Teague, Chris Boyes, Luke Dunn Glelmuda, Jim Likowski, Ken Fischer, Shannon Mills, Tim Nielsen, Chris Scarabosio, Dennie Thorpe, and Jana Vance	Won	
Grammy Awards	February 13, 2011	Best Score Soundtrack Album for Motion Picture, Television or Other Visual Media	James Horner	Nominated	
Grammy Awards	February 13, 2011	Best Song Written for Motion Picture, Television or Other Visual Media	"I See You" by Leona Lewis	Nominated	
Hollywood Post Alliance Awards	November 11, 2010	Outstanding Visual Effects – Feature Film	Erik Winquist, Robin Hollander, Erich Eder and Giuseppe Tagliavini - Weta Digital	Won	
Houston Film Critics Society	December 19, 2009	Best Picture	James Cameron and Jon Landau	Nominated	
Houston Film Critics Society	December 19, 2009	Best Director of a Motion Picture	James Cameron	Nominated	
Houston Film Critics Society	December 19, 2009	Best Cinematography	Mauro Fiore and Vince Pace	Nominated	
Houston Film Critics Society	December 19, 2009	Best Original Score	James Horner	Nominated	
Hugo Awards	September 2, 2010	Best Dramatic Presentation, Long Form	James Cameron	Nominated	
International Film Music Critics Association Awards	February 26, 2010	Film Score of the Year	James Horner	Nominated	
International Film Music Critics Association Awards	February 26, 2010	Film Composer of the Year	James Horner	Nominated	
International Film Music Critics Association Awards	February 26, 2010	Best Original Score for a Fantasy/Science Fiction Film	James Horner	Nominated	
International Film Music Critics Association Awards	February 26, 2010	Film Music Composition of the Year, for "War"	James Horner	Nominated	
Irish Film and Television Awards	February 20, 2010	Best International Film	James Cameron and Jon Landau	Nominated	
Italian National Syndicate of Film Journalists	June 19, 2010	Best 3D Film Director	James Cameron	Won	
Japan Academy Prize	February 18, 2011	Outstanding Foreign Language Film	James Cameron and Jon Landau	Won	
London Film Critics' Circle	February 18, 2010	Director of the Year	James Cameron	Nominated	
London Film Critics' Circle	February 18, 2010	Film of the Year	James Cameron and Jon Landau	Nominated	
MTV Movie Awards	June 6, 2010	Best Movie	Avatar	Nominated	
MTV Movie Awards	June 6, 2010	Best Female Performance	Zoe Saldana	Nominated	
MTV Movie Awards	June 6, 2010	Best Villain	Stephen Lang	Nominated	
MTV Movie Awards	June 6, 2010	Best Fight	Sam Worthington vs. Stephen Lang	Nominated	
MTV Movie Awards	June 6, 2010	Best Kiss	Zoe Saldana and Sam Worthington	Nominated	
NAACP Image Awards	February 26, 2010	Outstanding Supporting Actress in a Motion Picture	Zoe Saldana	Nominated	
National Movie Awards	May 26, 2010	Fantasy Film	Avatar	Nominated	
National Society of Film Critics	January 3, 2010	Best Production Design	Rick Carter and Robert Stromberg	Nominated	
New York Online Film Critics	December 13, 2009	Best Film	James Cameron and Jon Landau	Won	
New York Online Film Critics	December 13, 2009	Top 11 Films	James Cameron and Jon Landau	Won	
Nickelodeon Kids' Choice Awards	March 27, 2010	Cutest Couple	Neytiri and Jake (Zoe Saldana & Sam Worthington)	Nominated	
Nickelodeon Kids' Choice Awards	March 27, 2010	Favorite Movie Actress	Zoe Saldana	Nominated	
Online Film Critics Society	January 5, 2010	Best Cinematography	Mauro Fiore	Nominated	
Online Film Critics Society	January 5, 2010	Best Director	James Cameron	Nominated	
People's Choice Awards	January 6, 2010	Favorite 3D Live Action Movie	Avatar	Won	
People's Choice Awards	January 6, 2010	Favorite 3D Animated Movie	Avatar	Won	
Producers Guild of America Awards	January 24, 2010	Theatrical Motion Picture – Producer of the Year	James Cameron and Jon Landau	Nominated	
PETA's Proggy award	January 20, 2010	Outstanding Feature Film	James Cameron	Won	
San Diego Film Critics Society	December 15, 2009	Best Director	James Cameron	Nominated	
San Diego Film Critics Society	December 15, 2009	Best Production Design	Rick Carter and Robert Stromberg	Nominated	
Santa Barbara International Film Festival	February 6, 2010	Lucky Brand Modern Master Award	James Cameron	Won	
Saturn Awards	June 24, 2010	Visionary Award for Avatar	James Cameron	Won	
Saturn Awards	June 24, 2010	Best Science Fiction Film	James Cameron and Jon Landau	Won	
Saturn Awards	June 24, 2010	Best Actor	Sam Worthington	Won	
Saturn Awards	June 24, 2010	Best Actress	Zoe Saldana	Won	
Saturn Awards	June 24, 2010	Best Supporting Actor	Stephen Lang	Won	
Saturn Awards	June 24, 2010	Best Supporting Actress	Sigourney Weaver	Won	
Saturn Awards	June 24, 2010	Best Director	James Cameron	Won	
Saturn Awards	June 24, 2010	Best Writing	James Cameron	Won	
Saturn Awards	June 24, 2010	Best Music	James Horner	Won	
Saturn Awards	June 24, 2010	Best Production Design	Rick Carter and Robert Stromberg	Won	
Saturn Awards	June 24, 2010	Best Special Effects	Joe Letteri, Stephen Rosenbaum, Richard Baneham, and Andrew Jones	Won	
Scream Awards	October 16, 2010	Best Director	James Cameron	Won	
Scream Awards	October 16, 2010	Best F/X	Avatar	Won	
Scream Awards	October 16, 2010	The Ultimate Scream	Avatar	Nominated	
Scream Awards	October 16, 2010	Best Science Fiction Movie	Avatar	Nominated	
Scream Awards	October 16, 2010	Best Science Fiction Actress	Zoe Saldana	Nominated	
Scream Awards	October 16, 2010	Best Villain	Stephen Lang	Nominated	
Scream Awards	October 16, 2010	Best Supporting Actress	Sigourney Weaver	Nominated	
Scream Awards	October 16, 2010	Fight Scene of the Year	"Final Battle: Na'vi vs Military"	Nominated	
Scream Awards	October 16, 2010	3-D Top Three Award	Avatar	Won	
St. Louis Gateway Film Critics Association Awards	December 21, 2009	Best Visual/Special Effects	Joe Letteri, Stephen Rosenbaum, Richard Baneham and Andy Jones	Won	
St. Louis Gateway Film Critics Association Awards	December 21, 2009	Most Original/Innovative or Creative Film	James Cameron and Jon Landau	Won	
Teen Choice Awards	August 8, 2010	Sci-Fi Movie	Avatar	Won	
Teen Choice Awards	August 8, 2010	Choice Sci-Fi Movie Actress	Zoe Saldana	Won	
Teen Choice Awards	August 8, 2010	Choice Sci-Fi Movie Actor	Sam Worthington	Won	
Teen Choice Awards	August 8, 2010	Choice Movie Villain	Stephen Lang	Nominated	
Teen Choice Awards	August 8, 2010	Choice Movie Fight	Sam Worthington vs. Stephen Lang	Nominated	
Teen Choice Awards	August 8, 2010	Choice Movie Hissy Fit	Giovanni Ribisi	Nominated	
Visual Effects Society Awards	February 28, 2010	Lifetime Achievement, for Making of	James Cameron	Won	
Visual Effects Society Awards	February 28, 2010	Outstanding Visual Effects in a Visual Effects Driven Feature Motion Picture	Richard Baneham, Joyce Cox, Joe Letteri, and Eileen Moran	Won	
Visual Effects Society Awards	February 28, 2010	Best Single Visual Effect of the Year, for Quarich's Escape	Jill Brooks, John Knoll, Frank Losasso Petterson, and Tory Mercer	Nominated	
Visual Effects Society Awards	February 28, 2010	Best Single Visual Effect of the Year, for Neytiri Drinking	Thelvin Cabezas, Joyce Cox, Joe Letteri, and Eileen Moran	Won	
Visual Effects Society Awards	February 28, 2010	Outstanding Animated Character in a Live Action Feature Motion Picture, for Neytiri	Andrew Jones, Joe Letteri, Zoe Saldana, and Jeff Unay	Won	
Visual Effects Society Awards	February 28, 2010	Outstanding Matte Paintings in a Feature Motion Picture, for Pandora	Jean-Luc Azzis, Peter Baustaedter, Brenton Cottman, and Yvonne Muinde	Won	
Visual Effects Society Awards	February 28, 2010	Outstanding Models and Miniatures in a Feature Motion Picture, for Samson, Home Tree, Floating Mountains, & Ampsuit	Simon Cheung, Paul Jenness, John Stevenson-Galvin, and Rainer Zoettl	Won	
Visual Effects Society Awards	February 28, 2010	Outstanding Created Environment in a Feature Motion Picture, for Floating Mountains	Dan Lemmon, Keith F. Miller, Jessica Cowley, and Cameron Smith	Nominated	
Visual Effects Society Awards	February 28, 2010	Outstanding Created Environment in a Feature Motion Picture, for Jungle / Biolume	Shadi Almassizadeh, Dan Cox, Ula Rademeyer, and Eric Saindon	Won	
Visual Effects Society Awards	February 28, 2010	Outstanding Created Environment in a Feature Motion Picture, for Willow Glade	Thelvin Cabezas, Miae Kang, Daniel Macarin, and Guy Williams	Nominated	
Visual Effects Society Awards	February 28, 2010	Outstanding Compositing in a Feature Motion Picture	Erich Eder, Robin Hollander, Giuseppe Tagliavini, and Erik Winquist	Nominated	
Visual Effects Society Awards	February 28, 2010	Outstanding Compositing in a Feature Motion Picture, for End Battle	Jay Cooper, Beth D'Amato, Eddie Pasquarello, and Todd Vaziri	Nominated	
World Soundtrack Awards	October 23, 2010	Best Original Song	"I See You" by Leona Lewis	Nominated	
World Soundtrack Awards	October 23, 2010	Best Original Soundtrack	James Horner	Nominated	
Writers Guild of America Awards	February 20, 2010	Best Original Screenplay	James Cameron	Nominated	

== See also ==
- List of accolades received by Avatar: The Way of Water
