= List of accolades received by Avatar: The Way of Water =

Avatar: The Way of Water accolades
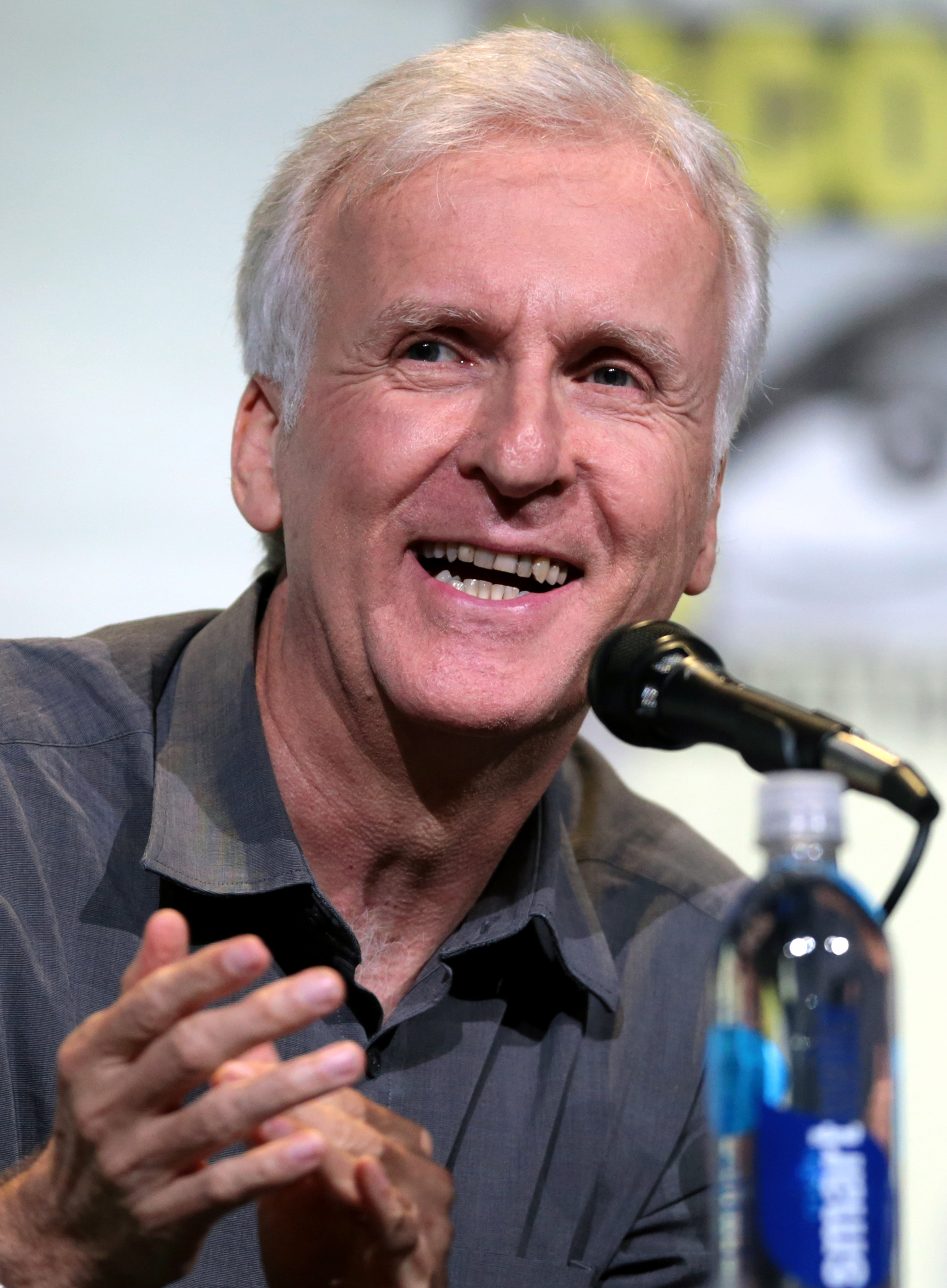
- James Cameron received multiple awards and nominations for his direction of the film.
Awards and nominations
Award	Wins	Nominations
AACTA International Awards	1	2
AARP Movies for Grownups Awards	0	1
Academy Awards	1	4
American Film Institute Awards	1	1
Annie Awards	2	2
Art Directors Guild Awards	0	1
Artios Awards	0	1
ASCAP Awards	1	1
Austin Film Critics Association Awards	0	4
Black Reel Awards	1	1
British Academy Film Awards	1	2
Chicago Film Critics Association Awards	0	2
Cinema Audio Society Awards	0	1
Costume Designers Guild Awards	0	1
Critics' Choice Movie Awards	1	6
Critics' Choice Super Awards	0	2
Dallas-Fort Worth Film Critics Association Awards	1	1
Dorian Awards	0	1
Florida Film Critics Circle Awards	1	1
Georgia Film Critics Association Awards	0	1
Golden Globe Awards	0	2
Golden Reel Awards	0	1
Golden Trailer Awards	2	8
Guild of Music Supervisors Awards	0	1
Hollywood Critics Association Awards	0	3
Hollywood Critics Association Creative Arts Awards	1	4
Hollywood Critics Association Midseason Awards	0	1
Hollywood Music in Media Awards	1	3
Hollywood Professional Association Awards	1	2
Houston Film Critics Society Awards	1	2
Hugo Awards	0	1
ICG Publicists Awards	0	1
Imagen Awards	1	1
International Film Music Critics Association Awards	2	3
Ivor Novello Awards	0	1
Japan Academy Film Prize	0	1
Los Angeles Film Critics Association Awards	1	1
Lumiere Awards	2	2
MTV Movie & TV Awards	0	1
National Board of Review Awards	1	1
New York Film Critics Online Awards	1	1
Nickelodeon Kids' Choice Awards	0	1
Online Film Critics Society Awards	2	3
Producers Guild of America Awards	0	1
The ReFrame Stamp	1	1
San Diego Film Critics Society Awards	1	4
Satellite Awards	2	6
Saturn Awards	4	12
Screen Actors Guild Awards	0	1
Seattle Film Critics Society Awards	1	3
Set Decorators Society of America Awards	0	1
St. Louis Gateway Film Critics Association Awards	1	3
Visual Effects Society Awards	9	14
Washington D.C. Area Film Critics Association Awards	1	3
World Soundtrack Awards	1	1

Totals (Note: Certain award groups do not simply award one winner. They acknowledge several different recipients, have runners-up, and have third place. Since this is a specific recognition and is different from losing an award, runner-up mentions are considered wins in this award tally. For simplification and to avoid errors, each award in this list has been presumed to have had a prior nomination.)
- Wins: 52
- Nominations: 135

Avatar: The Way of Water is a 2022 American epic science fiction film directed by James Cameron from a screenplay he co-wrote with Rick Jaffa and Amanda Silver, with a story the trio wrote with Josh Friedman and Shane Salerno. Produced by Lightstorm Entertainment, and distributed by 20th Century Studios, it is the sequel to Avatar (2009) and the second installment in the Avatar film series. The film stars Sam Worthington, Zoe Saldaña, Sigourney Weaver, Stephen Lang, and Kate Winslet. It follows a blue-skinned humanoid Na'vi named Jake Sully (Worthington) as he and his family, under renewed human threat, seek refuge with the aquatic Metkayina clan of Pandora, a habitable moon on which they live.

Avatar: The Way of Water premiered in London on December 6, 2022, and was released in the United States on December 16. Produced on a budget of $350–460 million, The Way of Water grossed $2.320 billion, finishing its theatrical run as the highest-grossing film of 2022 and the third-highest-grossing film of all time. On the review aggregator website Rotten Tomatoes, the film holds an approval rating of 76% based on 449 reviews.

Avatar: The Way of Water garnered many awards and nominations in various categories with particular recognition for Cameron's direction as well as its musical score, visual effects, cinematography, production design, and sound effects. It received four nominations at the 95th Academy Awards, including Best Picture. The film won Best Visual Effects. At the 76th British Academy Film Awards, it was nominated for Best Sound, and won Best Special Visual Effects. The Way of Water received six nominations at the 28th Critics' Choice Awards and won Best Visual Effects.

Avatar: The Way of Water garnered two nominations at the 80th Golden Globe Awards. The film won two awards at the 50th Annie Awards. At the 21st Visual Effects Society Awards, it was nominated for fourteen awards, a record that surpassed the number of previous ones for film (Avatar) and television (The Mandalorian). The film won nine, including Outstanding Visual Effects in a Photoreal Feature. In addition, both the American Film Institute and the National Board of Review selected The Way of Water as one of the top ten films of 2022.

== Accolades ==
Accolades received by Avatar: The Way of Water
Award	Date of ceremony	Category	Recipient(s)	Result	Ref.
AACTA International Awards	February 24, 2023	Best Film	Avatar: The Way of Water	Won	
AACTA International Awards	February 24, 2023	Best Direction	James Cameron	Nominated	
AARP Movies for Grownups Awards	January 28, 2023	Best Director	James Cameron	Nominated	
Academy Awards	March 12, 2023	Best Picture	James Cameron and Jon Landau	Nominated	
Academy Awards	March 12, 2023	Best Sound	Julian Howarth, Gwendolyn Yates Whittle, Dick Bernstein, Christopher Boyes, Gary Summers and Michael Hedges	Nominated	
Academy Awards	March 12, 2023	Best Production Design	Production Design: Dylan Cole and Ben Procter; Set Decoration: Vanessa Cole	Nominated	
Academy Awards	March 12, 2023	Best Visual Effects	Joe Letteri, Richard Baneham, Eric Saindon, and Daniel Barrett	Won	
American Film Institute Awards	December 9, 2022	Top 10 Films of the Year	Avatar: The Way of Water	Won (Note: This award does not have a single winner, but recognizes multiple films.)	
Annie Awards	February 25, 2023	Outstanding Achievement for Animated Effects in an Animated Production	Jonathan M. Nixon, David Moraton, Nicholas Illingworth, David Caeiro Cebrian, and Alex Nowotny	Won	
Annie Awards	February 25, 2023	Outstanding Achievement for Character Animation in a Live Action Production	Daniel Barrett, Stuart Adcock, Todd Labonte, Douglas McHale, and Stephen Cullingford	Won	
Art Directors Guild Awards	February 18, 2023	Excellence in Production Design for a Fantasy Film	Dylan Cole and Ben Procter	Nominated	
Artios Awards	March 9, 2023	The Zeitgeist Award	Margery Simkin, Katrina Wandel George, Jasmine Gutierrez, and Sydney Shircliff	Nominated	
ASCAP Awards	May 15, 2023	Film Score of the Year	Simon Franglen	Won	
Austin Film Critics Association Awards	January 10, 2023	Best Cinematography	Russell Carpenter	Nominated	
Austin Film Critics Association Awards	January 10, 2023	Best Voice Acting/Animated/Digital Performance	Stephen Lang	Nominated	
Austin Film Critics Association Awards	January 10, 2023	Best Voice Acting/Animated/Digital Performance	Zoe Saldaña	Nominated	
Austin Film Critics Association Awards	January 10, 2023	Best Voice Acting/Animated/Digital Performance	Sigourney Weaver	Nominated	
Black Reel Awards	February 6, 2023	Outstanding Voice Performance	Zoe Saldaña	Won	
British Academy Film Awards	February 19, 2023	Best Sound	Christopher Boyes, Gwendolyn Yates Whittle, Gary Summers, Michael Hedges, and Julian Howarth	Nominated	
British Academy Film Awards	February 19, 2023	Best Special Visual Effects	Joe Letteri, Richard Baneham, Eric Saindon, and Daniel Barrett	Won	
Chicago Film Critics Association Awards	December 14, 2022	Best Art Direction/Production Design	Avatar: The Way of Water	Nominated	
Chicago Film Critics Association Awards	December 14, 2022	Best Use of Visual Effects	Avatar: The Way of Water	Nominated	
Chinese American Film Festival	November 11, 2023	Most Popular U.S. Film in China	Avatar: The Way of Water	Won	
Cinema Audio Society Awards	March 4, 2023	Outstanding Achievement in Sound Mixing for a Motion Picture – Live Action	Julian Howarth, Christopher Boyes, Gary Summers, Michael Hedges, Simon Rhodes, Bill Higley, and Tavish Grade	Nominated	
Costume Designers Guild Awards	February 27, 2023	Excellence in Sci-Fi/Fantasy Film	Deborah L. Scott	Nominated	
Critics' Choice Movie Awards	January 15, 2023	Best Picture	Avatar: The Way of Water	Nominated	
Critics' Choice Movie Awards	January 15, 2023	Best Director	James Cameron	Nominated	
Critics' Choice Movie Awards	January 15, 2023	Best Cinematography	Russell Carpenter	Nominated	
Critics' Choice Movie Awards	January 15, 2023	Best Editing	Stephen Rivkin, David Brenner, John Refoua, and James Cameron	Nominated	
Critics' Choice Movie Awards	January 15, 2023	Best Production Design	Dylan Cole, Ben Procter, and Vanessa Cole	Nominated	
Critics' Choice Movie Awards	January 15, 2023	Best Visual Effects	Avatar: The Way of Water	Won	
Critics' Choice Super Awards	March 16, 2023	Best Science Fiction/Fantasy Movie	Avatar: The Way of Water	Nominated	
Critics' Choice Super Awards	March 16, 2023	Best Actress in a Science Fiction/Fantasy Movie	Zoe Saldaña	Nominated	
Dallas–Fort Worth Film Critics Association Awards	December 19, 2022	Best Cinematography	Russell Carpenter	Won	
Dorian Awards	February 23, 2023	Visually Striking Film of the Year	Avatar: The Way of Water	Nominated	
Florida Film Critics Circle Awards	December 22, 2022	Best Visual Effects	Avatar: The Way of Water	Won	
Georgia Film Critics Association Awards	January 13, 2023	Best Production Design	Dylan Cole, Ben Procter, and Vanessa Cole	Nominated	
Golden Globe Awards	January 10, 2023	Best Motion Picture – Drama	Avatar: The Way of Water	Nominated	
Golden Globe Awards	January 10, 2023	Best Director	James Cameron	Nominated	
Golden Reel Awards	February 26, 2023	Outstanding Achievement in Sound Editing – Sound Effects and Foley for Feature Film	Christopher Boyes, David Chrastka, Dave Whitehead, Hayden Collow, Matt Stutter, Brent Burge, Craig Tomlinson, Dee Selby, Dan O'Connell, and John Cucci	Nominated	
Golden Trailer Awards	October 6, 2022	Best Fantasy Adventure	"The Beginning" (JAX)	Nominated	
Golden Trailer Awards	October 6, 2022	Best Original Score	"The Beginning" (JAX)	Nominated	
Golden Trailer Awards	June 29, 2023	Best Music	"Strong Heart" (JAX)	Nominated	
Golden Trailer Awards	June 29, 2023	Best Fantasy Adventure TV Spot (for a Feature Film)	"Adapt" (Wild Card)	Nominated	
Golden Trailer Awards	June 29, 2023	Best Digital – Fantasy Adventure	"Great Strength" (Tiny Hero)	Nominated	
Golden Trailer Awards	June 29, 2023	Best Digital – Fantasy Adventure	"Journey" (Tiny Hero)	Won	
Golden Trailer Awards	June 29, 2023	Best Action/Thriller TrailerByte for a Feature Film	"Journey Through Pandora" (Tiny Hero)	Won	
Golden Trailer Awards	June 29, 2023	Best BTS/EPK for a Feature Film (Over 2 Minutes)	"Acting in the Volume" (Mob Scene)	Nominated	
Guild of Music Supervisors Awards	March 5, 2023	Best Music Supervision in a Trailer – Film	Anny Colvin	Nominated	
Hollywood Critics Association Awards	February 24, 2023	Best Picture	Avatar: The Way of Water	Nominated	
Hollywood Critics Association Awards	February 24, 2023	Best Director	James Cameron	Nominated	
Hollywood Critics Association Awards	February 24, 2023	Best Voice or Motion-Capture Performance	Zoe Saldaña	Nominated	
Hollywood Critics Association Creative Arts Awards	February 24, 2023	Best Cinematography	Russell Carpenter	Nominated	
Hollywood Critics Association Creative Arts Awards	February 24, 2023	Best Production Design	Dylan Cole, Ben Procter, and Vanessa Cole	Nominated	
Hollywood Critics Association Creative Arts Awards	February 24, 2023	Best Sound	Christopher Boyes, Gwendolyn Yates Whittle, Dick Bernstein, Gary Summers, Michael Hedges, and Julian Howarth	Nominated	
Hollywood Critics Association Creative Arts Awards	February 24, 2023	Best Visual Effects	Joe Letteri, Richard Baneham, Eric Saindon, and Daniel Barrett	Won	
Hollywood Critics Association Midseason Awards	July 1, 2022	Most Anticipated Film	Avatar: The Way of Water	Nominated	
Hollywood Music in Media Awards	November 16, 2022	Best Original Score in a Sci-Fi/Fantasy Film	Simon Franglen	Won	
Hollywood Music in Media Awards	November 16, 2022	Best Original Song in a Feature Film	Simon Franglen and Zoe Saldaña for "Song Chord"	Nominated	
Hollywood Music in Media Awards	November 16, 2022	Song/Score — Trailer	Simon Franglen for "Trailer"	Nominated	
Hollywood Professional Association Awards	November 28, 2023	Outstanding Visual Effects – Feature Film	Chris Edgen, Nick Epstein, Wayne Stables, Pavani Rao Boddapati, and Sergei Nevshupov (Weta FX)	Won	
Hollywood Professional Association Awards	November 28, 2023	Outstanding Visual Effects – Feature Film	David Vickery, Lee Briggs, Jan Maroske, Steve Ellis, and Miguel Perez-Senent (Industrial Light & Magic)	Nominated	
Houston Film Critics Society Awards	February 18, 2023	Best Cinematography	Russell Carpenter	Nominated	
Houston Film Critics Society Awards	February 18, 2023	Best Visual Effects	Avatar: The Way of Water	Won	
Hugo Awards	October 18–22, 2023	Best Dramatic Presentation, Long Form	James Cameron, Rick Jaffa, and Amanda Silver	Nominated	
ICG Publicists Awards	March 10, 2023	Maxwell Weinberg Publicists Showmanship Motion Picture Award	Avatar: The Way of Water	Nominated	
Imagen Awards	December 3, 2023	Best Actress – Feature Film	Zoe Saldaña	Won	
International Film Music Critics Association Awards	February 23, 2023	Film Score of the Year	Simon Franglen	Nominated	
International Film Music Critics Association Awards	February 23, 2023	Film Music Composition of the Year	Simon Franglen for "Leaving Home (Hometree)"	Won	
International Film Music Critics Association Awards	February 23, 2023	Best Original Score for a Fantasy/Science Fiction/Horror Film	Simon Franglen	Won	
Ivor Novello Awards	May 18, 2023	Best Original Film Score	Simon Franglen	Nominated	
Japan Academy Film Prize	March 10, 2023	Outstanding Foreign Language Film	Avatar: The Way of Water	Nominated	
Los Angeles Film Critics Association Awards	December 11, 2022	Best Production Design	Dylan Cole and Ben Proctor	Won	
Lumiere Awards	February 10, 2023	Best Feature Film – Live Action	Avatar: The Way of Water	Won	
Lumiere Awards	February 10, 2023	Voices For The Earth Award	Avatar: The Way of Water	Won	
MTV Movie & TV Awards	May 7, 2023	Best Movie	Avatar: The Way of Water	Nominated	
National Board of Review Awards	December 8, 2022	Top Ten Films	Avatar: The Way of Water	Won	
New York Film Critics Online Awards	December 11, 2022	Top Films of the Year	Avatar: The Way of Water	Won	
Nickelodeon Kids' Choice Awards	March 4, 2023	Favorite Movie	Avatar: The Way of Water	Nominated	
Online Film Critics Society Awards	January 23, 2023	Best Production Design	Avatar: The Way of Water	Nominated	
Online Film Critics Society Awards	January 23, 2023	Best Visual Effects	Avatar: The Way of Water	Won	
Online Film Critics Society Awards	January 23, 2023	3D Effects Design	Avatar: The Way of Water	Won	
Producers Guild of America Awards	February 25, 2023	Outstanding Producer of Theatrical Motion Pictures	Jon Landau and James Cameron	Nominated	
The ReFrame Stamp	March 1, 2023	2022 Top 100-Grossing Narrative Feature Recipients	Avatar: The Way of Water	Won	
San Diego Film Critics Society Awards	January 6, 2023	Best Cinematography	Russell Carpenter	Nominated	
San Diego Film Critics Society Awards	January 6, 2023	Best Editing	David Brenner, James Cameron, John Refoua, Stephen Rivkin, and Ian Silverstein	Nominated	
San Diego Film Critics Society Awards	January 6, 2023	Best Sound Design	Avatar: The Way of Water	Nominated	
San Diego Film Critics Society Awards	January 6, 2023	Best Visual Effects	Avatar: The Way of Water	Won	
Satellite Awards	March 3, 2023	Best Motion Picture, Drama	Avatar: The Way of Water	Nominated	
Satellite Awards	March 3, 2023	Best Director	James Cameron	Won	
Satellite Awards	March 3, 2023	Best Cinematography	Russell Carpenter	Nominated	
Satellite Awards	March 3, 2023	Best Production Design	Dylan Cole and Ben Procter	Nominated	
Satellite Awards	March 3, 2023	Best Sound	Dick Bernstein, Christopher Boyes, Michael Hedges, Julian Howarth, Gary Summers, and Gwendolyn Yates Whittle	Nominated	
Satellite Awards	March 3, 2023	Best Visual Effects	Richie Baneham, Dan Barrett, Joe Letteri, and Eric Saindon	Won	
Screen Actors Guild Awards	February 26, 2023	Outstanding Performance by a Stunt Ensemble in a Motion Picture	Avatar: The Way of Water	Nominated	
Saturn Awards	February 4, 2024	Best Science Fiction Film	Avatar: The Way of Water	Won	
Saturn Awards	February 4, 2024	Best Actor	Sam Worthington	Nominated	
Saturn Awards	February 4, 2024	Best Actress	Zoe Saldaña	Nominated	
Saturn Awards	February 4, 2024	Best Supporting Actor	Stephen Lang	Nominated	
Saturn Awards	February 4, 2024	Best Performance by a Younger Actor	Jack Champion	Nominated	
Saturn Awards	February 4, 2024	Best Director	James Cameron	Won	
Saturn Awards	February 4, 2024	Best Writing	James Cameron, Rick Jaffa, and Amanda Silver	Won	
Saturn Awards	February 4, 2024	Best Production Design	Dylan Cole and Ben Proctor	Nominated	
Saturn Awards	February 4, 2024	Best Editing	Stephen Rivkin, David Brenner, John Refoua, and James Cameron	Nominated	
Saturn Awards	February 4, 2024	Best Music	Simon Franglen	Nominated	
Saturn Awards	February 4, 2024	Best Costume Design	Bob Buck and Deborah Scott	Nominated	
Saturn Awards	February 4, 2024	Best Special Effects	Joe Letteri, Richard Baneham, Eric Saindon, and Daniel Barrett	Won	
Seattle Film Critics Society Awards	January 17, 2023	Best Action Choreography	Avatar: The Way of Water	Nominated	
Seattle Film Critics Society Awards	January 17, 2023	Best Cinematography	Russell Carpenter	Nominated	
Seattle Film Critics Society Awards	January 17, 2023	Best Visual Effects	Joe Letteri, Richard Baneham, Eric Saindon, and Daniel Barrett	Won	
Set Decorators Society of America Awards	February 14, 2023	Best Achievement in Decor/Design of a Science Fiction or Fantasy Feature Film	Dylan Cole, Ben Procter, and Vanessa Cole	Nominated	
St. Louis Gateway Film Critics Association Awards	December 18, 2022	Best Action Film	Avatar: The Way of Water	Nominated	
St. Louis Gateway Film Critics Association Awards	December 18, 2022	Best Visual Effects	Joe Letteri, Richard Baneham, Eric Saindon, and Daniel Barrett	Won	
St. Louis Gateway Film Critics Association Awards	December 18, 2022	Best Production Design	Dylan Cole and Ben Procter	Nominated	
Visual Effects Society Awards	February 15, 2023	Outstanding Visual Effects in a Photoreal Feature	Richard Baneham, Walter Garcia, Joe Letteri, Eric Saindon, and J. D. Schwalm	Won	
Visual Effects Society Awards	February 15, 2023	Outstanding Animated Character in a Photoreal Feature	Anneka Fris, Rebecca Louise Leybourne, Guillaume Francois, and Jung-Rock Hwang for "Kiri"	Won	
Visual Effects Society Awards	February 15, 2023	Outstanding Created Environment in a Photoreal Feature	Ryan Arcus, Lisa Hardisty, Paul Harris, and TaeHyoung David Kim for "Metkayina Village"	Nominated	
Visual Effects Society Awards	February 15, 2023	Outstanding Created Environment in a Photoreal Feature	Jessica Cowley, Joe W. Churchill, Justin Stockton, and Alex Nowotny for "The Reef"	Won	
Visual Effects Society Awards	February 15, 2023	Outstanding Effects Simulations in a Photoreal Feature	Miguel Perez Senent, Xaxier Martin Ramirez, David Kirchner, and Ole Geir Eidsheim for "Fire and Destruction"	Nominated	
Visual Effects Society Awards	February 15, 2023	Outstanding Effects Simulations in a Photoreal Feature	Jonathan M. Nixon, David Moraton, Nicolas Illingworth, and David Caeiro Cebrian for "Water Simulations"	Won	
Visual Effects Society Awards	February 15, 2023	Outstanding Compositing and Lighting in a Feature	Miguel Santana Da Silva, Hongfei Geng, Jonathan Moulin, and Maria Corcho for "Landing Rockets Forest Destruction"	Nominated	
Visual Effects Society Awards	February 15, 2023	Outstanding Compositing and Lighting in a Feature	Sam Cole, Francois Sugny, Florian Schroeder, and Jean Matthews for "Water Integration"	Won	
Visual Effects Society Awards	February 15, 2023	Outstanding Virtual Cinematography in a CG Project	Richard Baneham, Dan Cox, Eric Reynolds, and A.J Briones	Won	
Visual Effects Society Awards	February 15, 2023	Outstanding Model in a Photoreal or Animated Project	Sam Sharplin, Stephen Skorepa, Ian Baker, and Guillaume Francois for "The Sea Dragon"	Won	
Visual Effects Society Awards	February 15, 2023	Outstanding Special (Practical) Effects in a Photoreal or Animated Project	J. D. Schwalm, Richie Schwalm, Nick Rand, and Robert Spurlock for "Current Machine and Wave Pool"	Won	
Visual Effects Society Awards	February 15, 2023	Emerging Technology Award	Dejan Momcilovic, Tobias B. Schmidt, Benny Edlund, and Joshua Hardgrave for "Depth Comp"	Nominated	
Visual Effects Society Awards	February 15, 2023	Emerging Technology Award	Byungkuk Choi, Stephen Cullingford, Stuart Adcock, and Marco Revelant for "Facial System"	Nominated	
Visual Effects Society Awards	February 15, 2023	Emerging Technology Award	Alexy Dmitrievich Stomakhin, Steve Lesser, Sven Joel Wretborn, and Douglas McHale for "Water Toolset"	Won	
Washington D.C. Area Film Critics Association Awards	December 12, 2022	Best Motion Capture Performance	Sam Worthington	Nominated	
Washington D.C. Area Film Critics Association Awards	December 12, 2022	Best Motion Capture Performance	Sigourney Weaver	Nominated	
Washington D.C. Area Film Critics Association Awards	December 12, 2022	Best Motion Capture Performance	Zoe Saldaña	Won	
World Soundtrack Awards	October 21, 2023	Discovery of the Year	Simon Franglen	Won	

== See also ==
- List of accolades received by Avatar
