= Avatar: The Way of Water =

2022 film by James Cameron

- Theatrical release poster
- Directed by: James Cameron
- Screenplay by: James Cameron; Rick Jaffa Amanda Silver
- Story by: James Cameron; Rick Jaffa; Amanda Silver; Josh Friedman; Shane Salerno
- Produced by: James Cameron; Jon Landau
- Starring: Sam Worthington; Zoe Saldaña; Sigourney Weaver; Stephen Lang; Kate Winslet
- Cinematography: Russell Carpenter
- Edited by: Stephen E. Rivkin (Note: Credited as Stephen Rivkin); David Brenner; John Refoua; James Cameron
- Music by: Simon Franglen (Note: Original Avatar themes by James Horner)
- Production company: Lightstorm Entertainment
- Distributed by: 20th Century Studios
- Release dates: December 6, 2022 (Odeon Luxe Leicester Square); December 16, 2022 (United States)
- Running time: 192 minutes
- Country: United States
- Language: English
- Budget: $350–460 million
- Box office: $2.334 billion

Avatar: The Way of Water is a 2022 American epic science fiction film directed by James Cameron and written by Cameron, Rick Jaffa and Amanda Silver. It is the second installment in the Avatar film series and the sequel to Avatar (2009). Sam Worthington, Zoe Saldaña and Stephen Lang reprise their roles from the first film, with Sigourney Weaver returning in an additional role and Kate Winslet joining the cast. The plot follows Jake Sully, a human-Na'vi hybrid, and his family on the habitable moon Pandora. Hunted by RDA forces, they flee to an oceanic region to seek refuge with the Metkayina clan.

Following the success of Avatar in 2009, two sequels were announced, with the first aiming for a 2014 release. However, the addition of two more sequels—for a total of five films—and the need to develop new technology to film motion-capture scenes underwater, led to significant delays. The filming process, which occurred simultaneously with the third film in the franchise, Avatar: Fire and Ash, began in Manhattan Beach, California, on August 15, 2017. Production moved to Wellington, New Zealand the following month, and was completed three years later, in September 2020. With an estimated budget of $350–460 million, Avatar: The Way of Water is one of the most expensive films ever made. It was produced by Cameron's company Lightstorm Entertainment.

After repeated delays in release, Avatar: The Way of Water premiered at the Odeon Leicester Square theater in London on December 6, 2022, and was released in the United States on December 16, by 20th Century Studios. The film received generally positive reviews from critics, who praised the visual effects and technical achievements but criticized the runtime. It was a major box office success, breaking multiple records. It grossed $2.334 billion worldwide, becoming the highest-grossing film of 2022 and the third-highest-grossing film at the time of its release. Among its many accolades, it was named one of the top-ten films of 2022 by The National Board of Review and the American Film Institute. It was also nominated for four awards at the 95th Academy Awards, including Best Picture, and won for Best Visual Effects. The sequel, Avatar: Fire and Ash, was released in December 2025.

== Plot ==
Sixteen years after the Na'vi repelled the Resources Development Administration (RDA) from Pandora, (Note: As depicted in Avatar (2009)) Jake Sully is chief of the Omatikaya clan. He and his wife Neytiri have two sons, Neteyam and Lo'ak, a daughter, Tuktirey ("Tuk"), and an adopted daughter, Kiri, who was born from the inert avatar of Dr. Grace Augustine. Miles "Spider" Socorro, son of the deceased Colonel Miles Quaritch, is a close friend of the Sully children, and is being raised by the human scientists who stayed on Pandora.

The RDA returns to colonize Pandora. Among the colonists are recombinants, Na'vi avatars implanted with memories of dead human soldiers, including a recombinant Quaritch. As Jake leads a guerrilla warfare campaign against the RDA, Quaritch searches for Jake's headquarters. Quaritch and his team capture Jake's children, but Jake and Neytiri free them. Quaritch also captures Spider, and recognizes him as his son. After the RDA fails to gain information from Spider, Quaritch decides to spend time with his son to gain his favor. In return, Spider teaches Quaritch about Na'vi culture and language.

Knowing that Spider's knowledge could lead Quaritch to the Omatikaya, Jake and his family leave their clan and relocate to Pandora's eastern sea, where they are granted asylum by the aquatic Metkayina clan. The Sully family begins assimilating into the clan by learning their ways, although Jake's children have conflicts with the sons of Tonowari, the Metkayina chief. Lo'ak befriends Tsireya, Tonowari's daughter.

Tonowari's son Aonung and his friends entice Lo'ak to join a hunting trip, but strand him in a dangerous part of the sea. Lo'ak is saved from a shark-like predator by Payakan, who is a Tulkun—a highly intelligent whale-like creature. Lo'ak bonds with Payakan, and learns that he has been exiled by the other Tulkun. Kiri connects to the Metkayina's underwater Spirit Tree and meets her mother Grace in a vision, but suffers a seizure and nearly drowns. Jake summons his scientist friends Norm Spellman and Max Patel for help; they diagnose Kiri with epilepsy, warning that she may die if she links with the Spirit Tree again.

Quaritch tracks Norm and Max's aircraft to the Metkayina's archipelago. He commandeers a ship which is hunting the Tulkun, and interrogates the Na'vi in the archipelago. After the Na'vi fail to give him information about Jake, he burns their dwellings. Meanwhile, Lo'ak mentally links with Payakan and learns that he was exiled because he attacked humans who killed his mother, a violation of the Tulkun vow of pacifism.

Aware that the Metkayina have a spiritual bond with the Tulkun, Quaritch attempts to draw Jake out by ordering the ship's captain, Mick Scoresby, to hunt Tulkun close to Na'vi villages, including Ronal’s spirit sister, Ro’a, and her son. When the Metkayina learn of the Tulkun killings, Lo'ak goes to warn Payakan, accompanied by several other children. They find that Payakan has been tagged for capture by the RDA. They help him escape, but are caught by Quaritch's team. Jake, Neytiri, and the Metkayina pursue Quaritch, who demands that Jake surrender himself in exchange for his children. Before Jake reaches the ship, Payakan attacks it, sparking a battle between the Metkayina and Quaritch's forces. Spider sabotages the RDA vessel, while Neteyam rescues Lo'ak, Tsireya, and Spider. During their escape, Neteyam is fatally shot.

Enraged at Neteyam's death, Jake and Neytiri attack Quaritch's crew, seeking to rescue Kiri and Tuk. After Jake frees Tuk, Quaritch threatens to kill Kiri, but he releases her when Neytiri threatens to kill Spider. After a tense skirmish, Jake strangles Quaritch unconscious. Jake is rescued from the sinking ship by Lo'ak and Payakan, while Kiri saves Neytiri and Tuk. Spider saves Quaritch from drowning but refuses to stay with him.

After Neteyam's funeral, Jake informs Tonowari of his decision to leave the Metkayina, but Tonowari declares Jake's family part of the clan and welcomes them to stay. Afterwards, the Sullys and Payakan visit the Spirit Tree, and Jake, Neytiri, and Lo’ak relive their happiest memories of Neteyam. Jake realizes he cannot keep running from Quaritch and the RDA, and must stand and fight instead.

== Cast ==
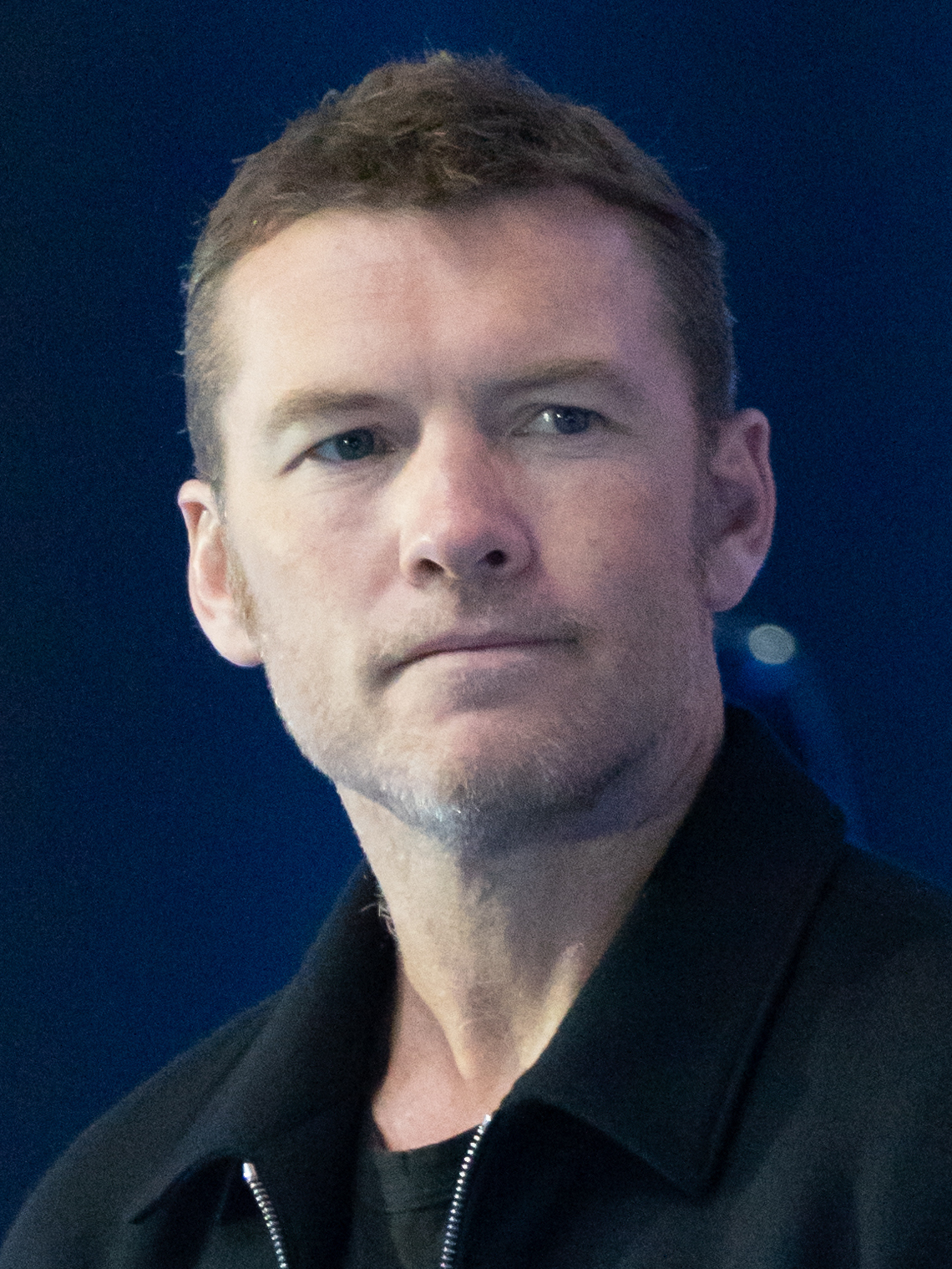
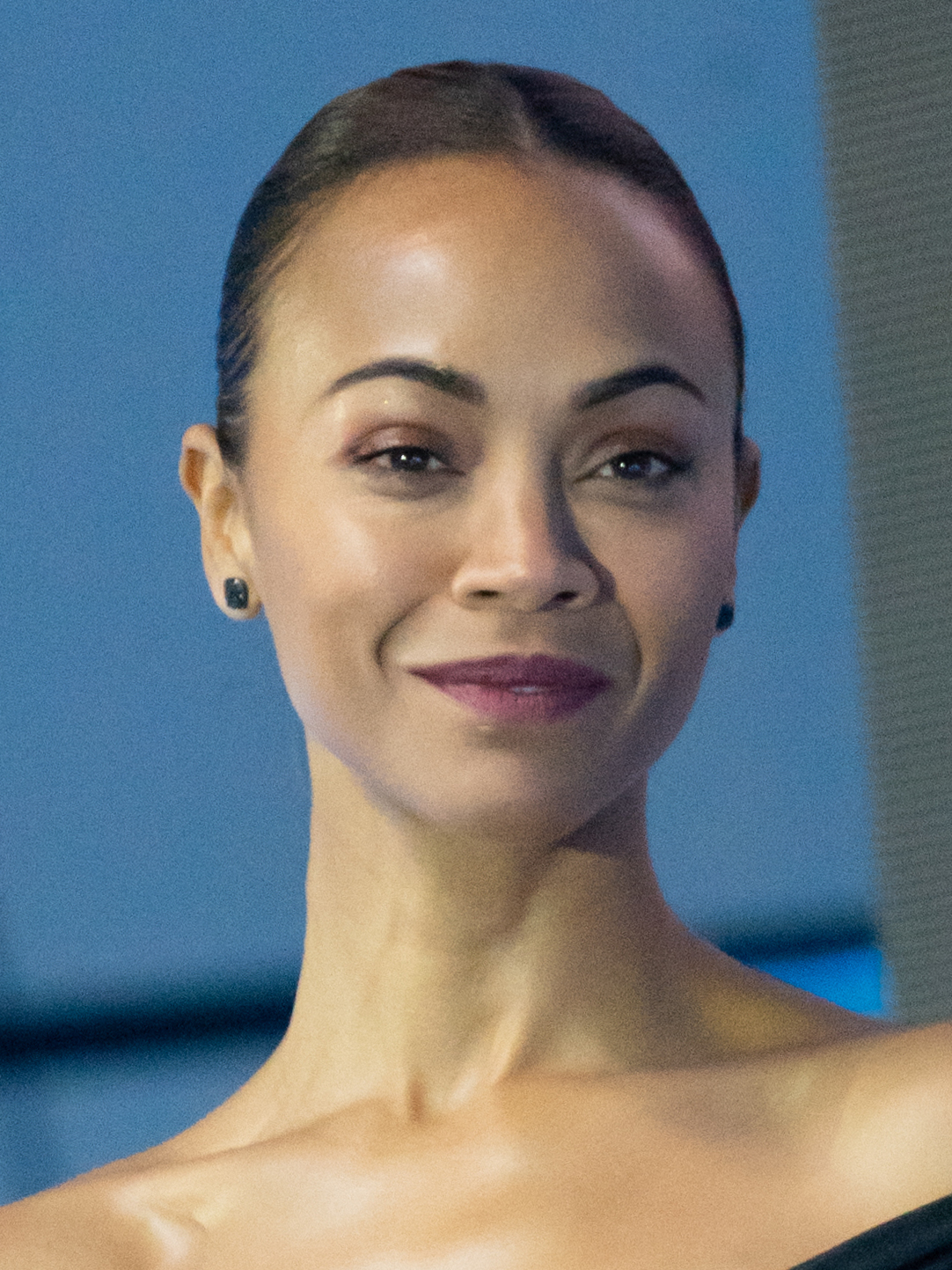
Sam Worthington (left) and Zoe Saldaña reprised their roles from Avatar.
- Sam Worthington as Jake Sully: A human who was transferred into a Na'vi body and led the effort to drive the RDA off Pandora.
- Zoe Saldaña as Neytiri: Jake's wife.
- Sigourney Weaver as Kiri: Jake and Neytiri's adopted daughter who was born from Dr. Grace Augustine's inert Na'vi avatar. Weaver also reprises her role as Dr. Grace Augustine. (Note: Attributed to multiple references:)
- Stephen Lang as Colonel Miles Quaritch: The human commander of the RDA security forces, who was killed by Neytiri then later resurrected as a Na'vi recombinant. (Note: Attributed to multiple references:)
- Kate Winslet as Ronal: The pregnant wife of Tonowari, the chief of the Metkayina clan. (Note: Attributed to multiple references:)
- Cliff Curtis as Tonowari: The chief of the Metkayina clan.
- Joel David Moore as Dr. Norm Spellman: A human scientist and ally of the Na'vi who stayed on Pandora when the RDA was driven off.
- CCH Pounder as Mo'at: The Omatikaya's spiritual leader and Neytiri's mother.
- Edie Falco as General Frances Ardmore: The commander in charge of the RDA's interests.
- Brendan Cowell as Captain Mick Scoresby: A hunter of the whale-like Tulkun.
- Jemaine Clement as Dr. Ian Garvin: A marine biologist employed by Scoresby.
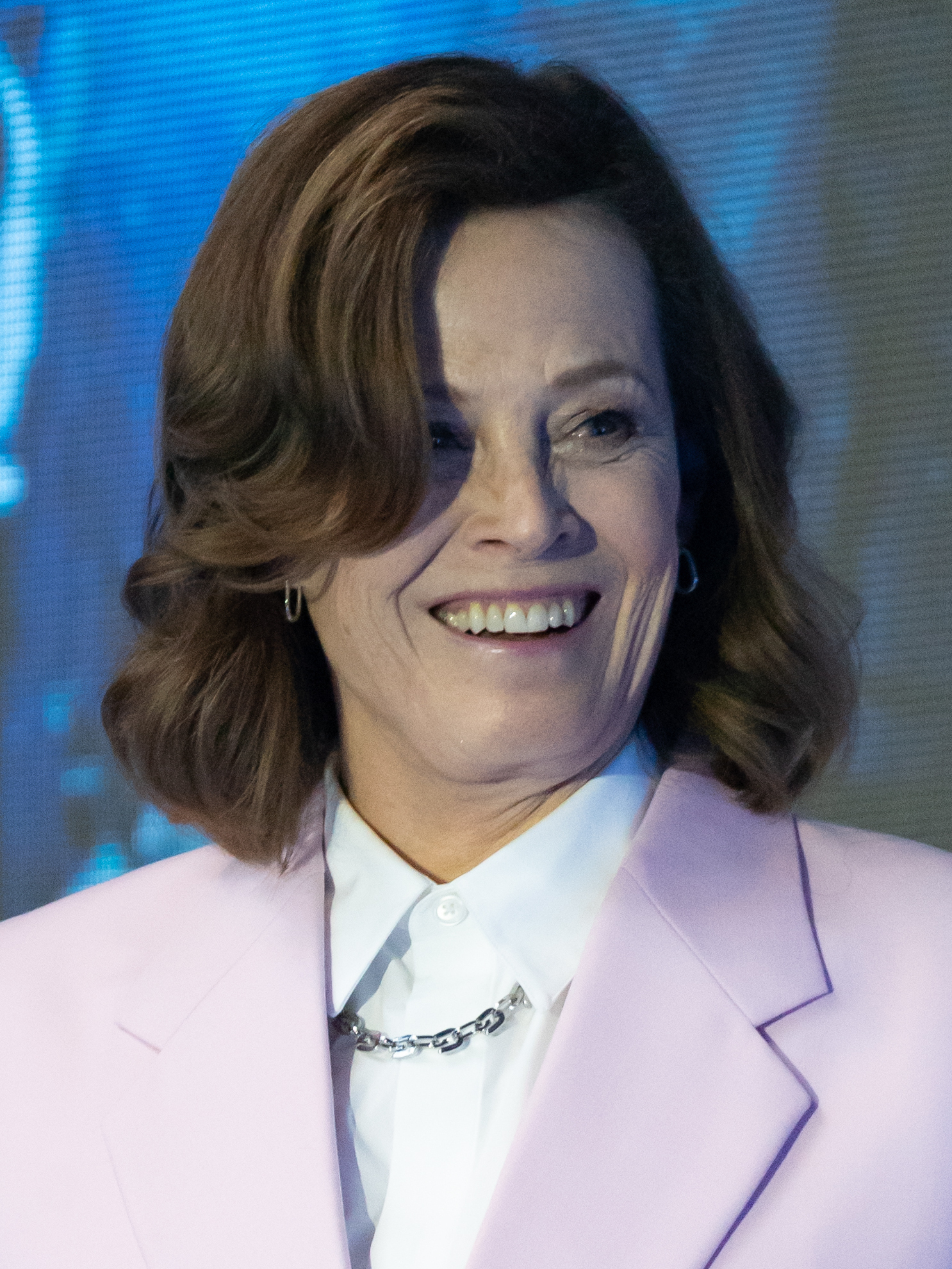
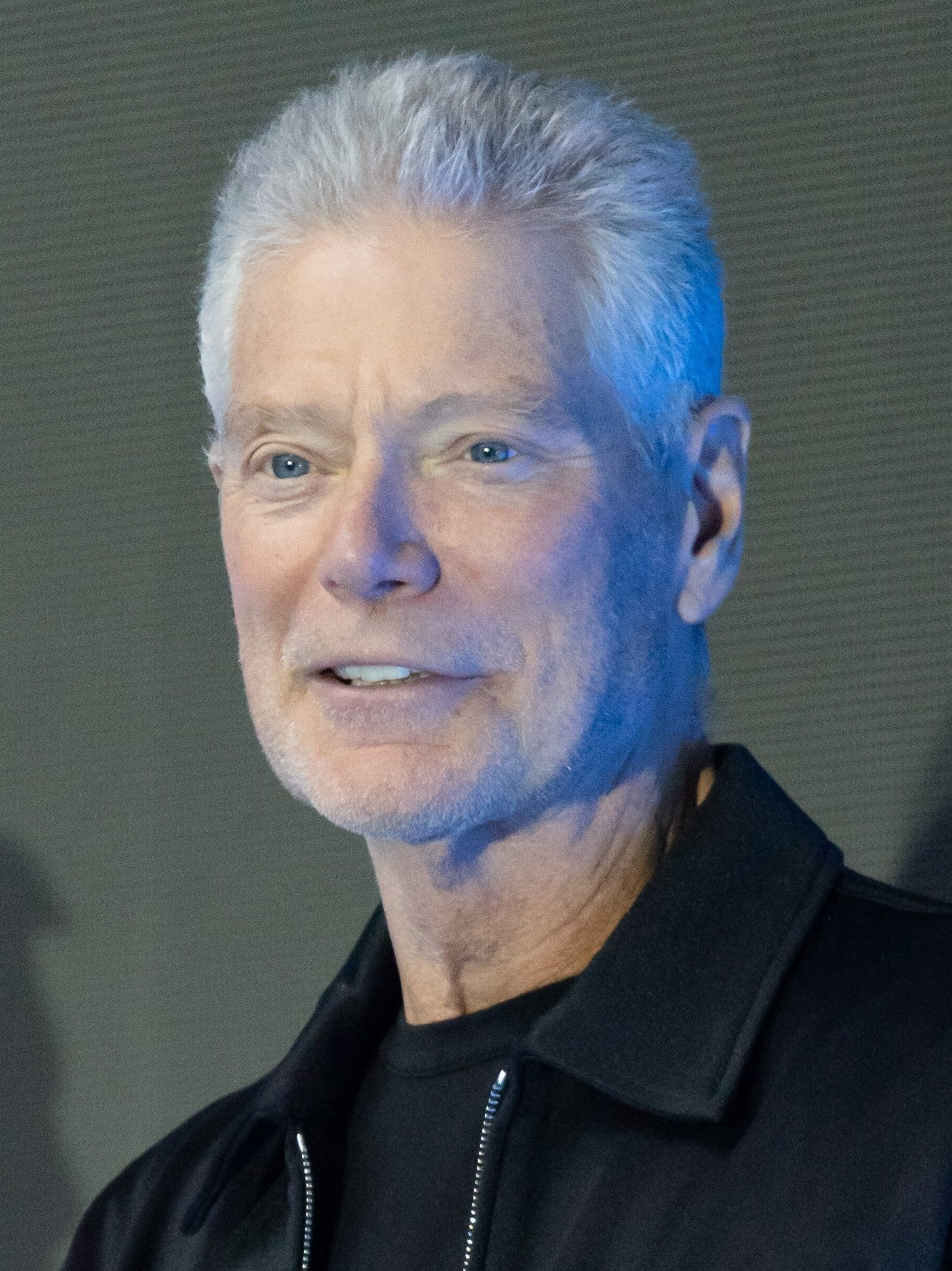
  Sigourney Weaver (left) and Stephen Lang have appeared in all three Avatar films to date.
- Jamie Flatters as Neteyam: Jake and Neytiri's teenaged son and oldest child. Jeremy Irwin plays a younger Neteyam, while Joel David Moore's son Oliver appears as the infant Neteyam.
- Britain Dalton as Lo'ak: Jake and Neytiri's second son. Chloe Coleman plays a young Lo'ak.
- Trinity Bliss as Tuktirey ("Tuk"): Jake and Neytiri's daughter and their youngest child. (Note: Attributed to multiple references:)
- Jack Champion as Miles "Spider" Socorro: The teenaged human son of Quaritch who was raised by the human scientists who stayed on Pandora. He was adopted by Jake and Neytiri.
- Bailey Bass as Tsireya: The daughter of Tonowari and Ronal of the Metkayina.
- Filip Geljo as Aonung: The son of Tonowari and Ronal of the Metkayina.
- Duane Evans Jr. as Rotxo: A Metkayina youth.
- Giovanni Ribisi as Parker Selfridge: The former administrator of the RDA who was expelled from Pandora. (Note: Attributed to multiple references:)
- Dileep Rao as Dr. Max Patel: A human scientist and ally of the Na'vi who stayed on Pandora when the RDA was driven off.
- Matt Gerald as Corporal Lyle Wainfleet: A recombinant under Quaritch's command.

Alicia Vela-Bailey appears uncredited as the recombinant Zdinarsk "Z-Dog". CJ Jones, who helped create the Na'vi sign language for the film, appears in an uncredited role as a Metkayina interpreter. Keston John plays Tarsem, who becomes chief of the Omatikaya after Jake and his family flee.

== Production ==
=== Development ===
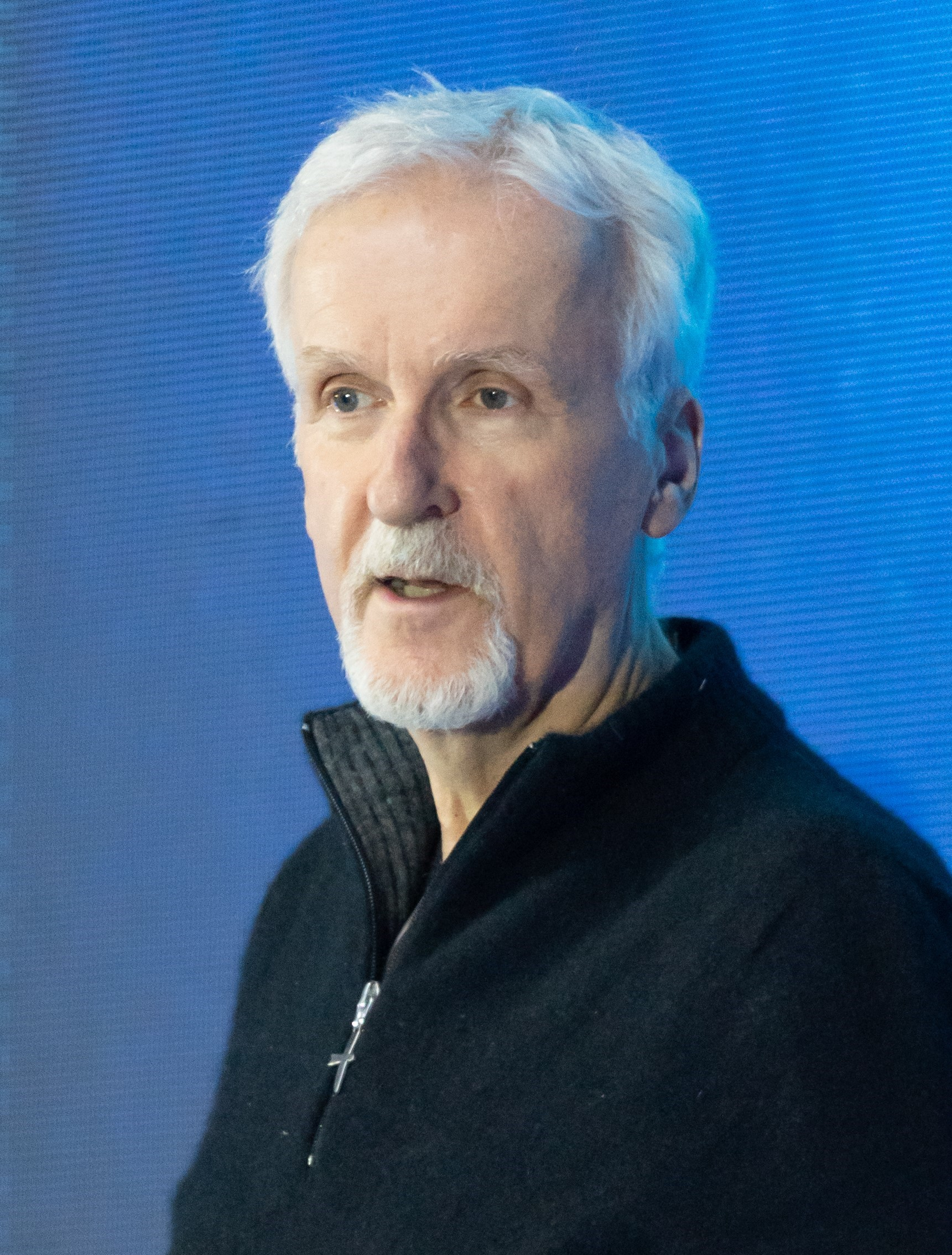
Director James Cameron in 2022

In 2006, Cameron said if Avatar (2009) was successful, he would consider making two sequels; he had included scenes in the first film that could be used for future story follow-ups. In 2010, he said the sequels would proceed as planned as a result of the film's widespread success. He said the sequels would explore other nearby moons, and he intended to capture footage for the films at the bottom of the Mariana Trench using a deepwater submersible. (Note: Attributed to multiple references:) The films would continue the environmental theme of Avatar, but would not be "strident" and would be focused more on entertainment. Cameron planned to shoot the sequels back-to-back and at a higher frame rate than the industry standard 24 frames per second, to add a heightened sense of reality. The sequels were originally scheduled for release in 2014 and 2015.

In 2013, Cameron announced that the sequels would be filmed in New Zealand, with performance capture to take place in 2014. An agreement with the New Zealand government required at least one world premiere to be held in Wellington and at least NZ$500 million (roughly US$410 million) to be spent on production activity in New Zealand, including live-action filming and visual effects. The New Zealand government announced it would raise its baseline tax rebate for filmmaking from 15% to 20%, with 25% available to international productions in some cases.

Cameron mentioned a possible third sequel for the first time in 2012, confirming it the following year. By August 2013, his plan was to release Avatar 2 in 2016, followed by the other two sequels in 2017 and 2018. By 2015, the complex writing process forced Cameron to delay the release of each sequel by a year, with the first sequel slated for release in December 2017. The following month, Fox announced a further release delay. By February 2016, production of the sequels was scheduled to begin in April 2016 in New Zealand. In April 2016, Cameron announced at CinemaCon that there would be four Avatar sequels, all filmed simultaneously.

New crew members for the sequels included cinematographer Russell Carpenter, who worked with Cameron on True Lies (1994) and Titanic (1997), and art director Aashrita Kamath. (Note: Attributed to multiple references:) Kirk Krack, founder of Performance Freediving International, worked as a free-diving trainer for the cast and crew for the underwater scenes.

=== Writing ===
In 2012, Cameron said the sequels were being written as separate stories with "an overall arc inclusive of the first film", with the second film having a clear conclusion instead of a cliffhanger ending. The following year, four screenwriters were announced: Josh Friedman, Shane Salerno, and the writing duo of Rick Jaffa and Amanda Silver. In April 2014, Cameron said he expected to finish the three screenplays within six weeks, stating that all three sequels would be in production simultaneously and were still slated for released between 2016 and 2018. He said although Friedman, Salerno, and the duo of Jaffa and Silver were each co-writing one sequel with him, at first everyone worked together on all the scripts. Cameron waited until as late as possible to assign each writer to a specific film, so they would stay focused on the larger overall story. (Note: Attributed to multiple references:) At one point, Cameron threatened to fire his writers because they were not spending enough time figuring out what made the original film so popular, a process he felt was essential to guarantee the success of the sequels. The writing took longer than expected, and in early 2015 Cameron further delayed the release of the sequels. In 2016, Cameron announced there would be four sequels instead of three, and in February 2017 he announced that the writing of all four films was complete. He estimated that the scripts had taken four years to write overall.

Cameron said The Way of Water explores the consequences of Jake and Neytiri becoming parents. He explained that Jake could act recklessly in the first film, without the responsibilities of a family, but now he has to be more careful. Cameron said a question for Jake, as both a warrior and father, is whether to protect his sons or allow them to fight. In a December 2019 interview, Stephen Lang said Cameron always meant for his character Quaritch to return, even as they were shooting the original film.

At one point during the writing process, Cameron spent a year writing a 130-page script for the first sequel himself, titled Avatar: The High Ground. He ultimately threw it out, because he felt it lacked the spiritual component which was central to the success of Avatar, and because it did not have enough surprises for audiences. The High Ground was ultimately turned into a comic book series that takes place between Avatar and Avatar:The Way of Water. (Note: Attributed to multiple references:)

=== Casting ===
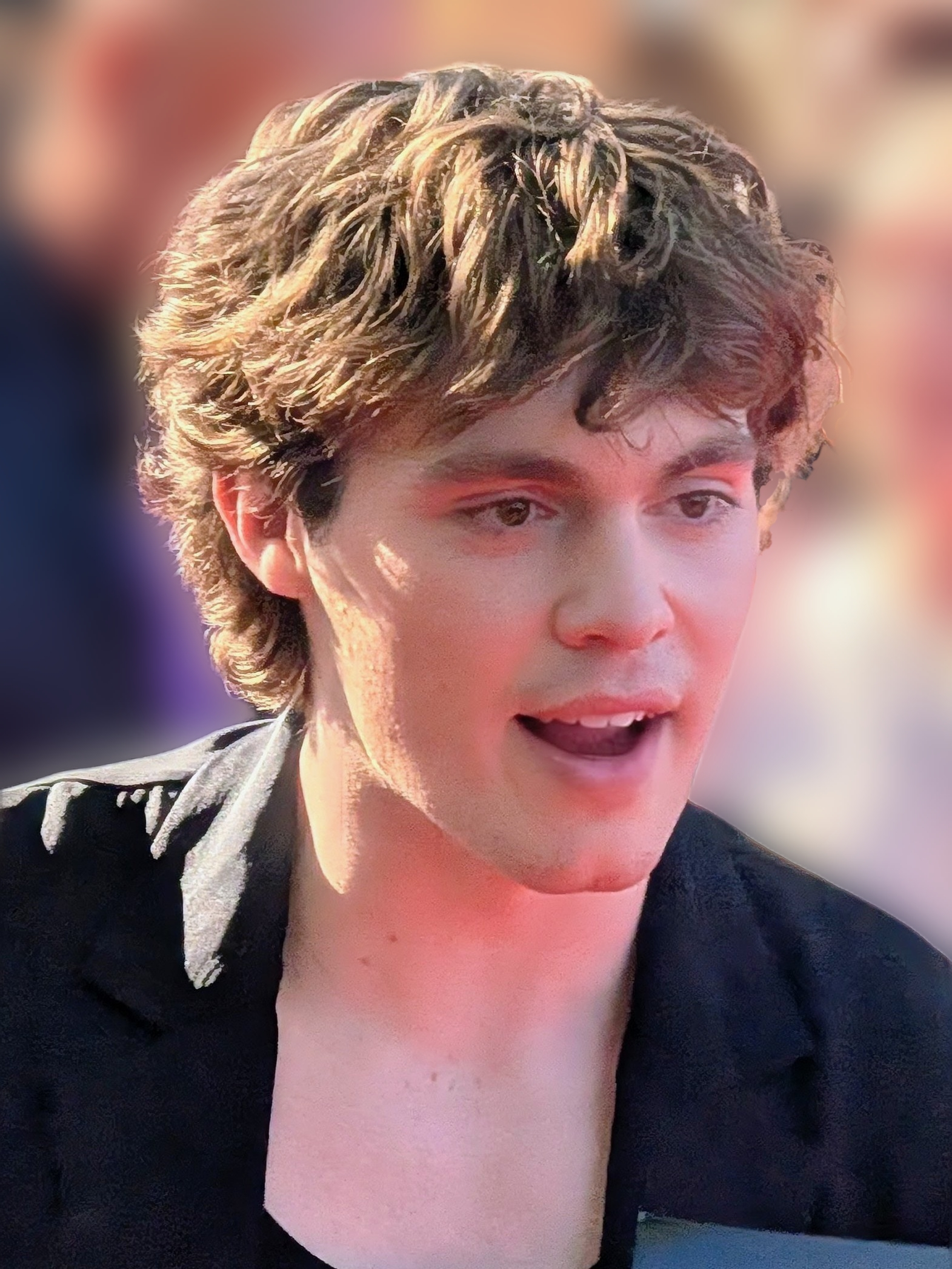
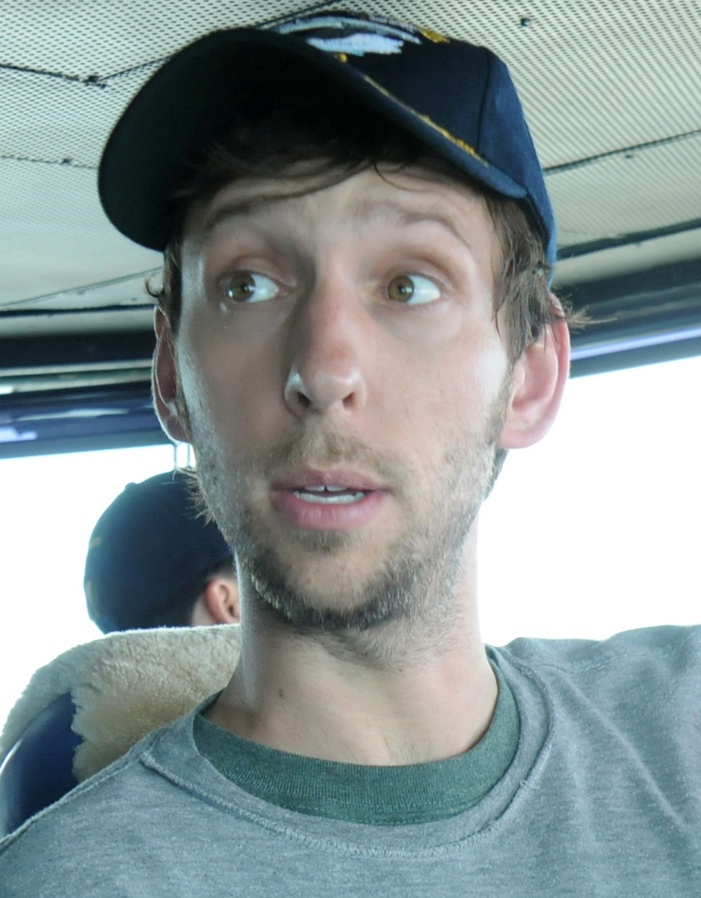
Jack Champion (left) joined the cast as Miles "Spider" Socorro, while Joel David Moore returned as Dr. Norm Spellman.

When they were cast for Avatar, Sam Worthington and Zoe Saldaña had signed on for future sequels. In the years following Avatar, both Sigourney Weaver and Stephen Lang were confirmed as returning for future films, despite the deaths of their characters in the first film. (Note: Attributed to multiple references:) Cameron revealed that Quaritch would be the main antagonist in all four films, and that his character was going to evolve in "unexpected" ways. (Note: Attributed to multiple references:) In 2015, Michelle Rodriguez announced that she would not be returning for Avatar 2.

Several cast announcements were made in 2017. Joel David Moore, CCH Pounder and Matt Gerald were confirmed to return from Avatar. (Note: Attributed to multiple references:) Cliff Curtis joined the cast as Tonowari, the leader of a Na'vi reef clan called the Metkayina. During September, seven child actors were announced as part of the cast. Jamie Flatters, Britain Dalton and Trinity Bliss would portray Jake and Neytiri's children; Filip Geljo, Bailey Bass and Duane Evans Jr. would appear as Metkayina children; and Jack Champion would play a human born on Pandora. The young actors would spend six months training for underwater scenes filmed in performance capture, and eventually they could all hold their breath underwater for 2–4 minutes.

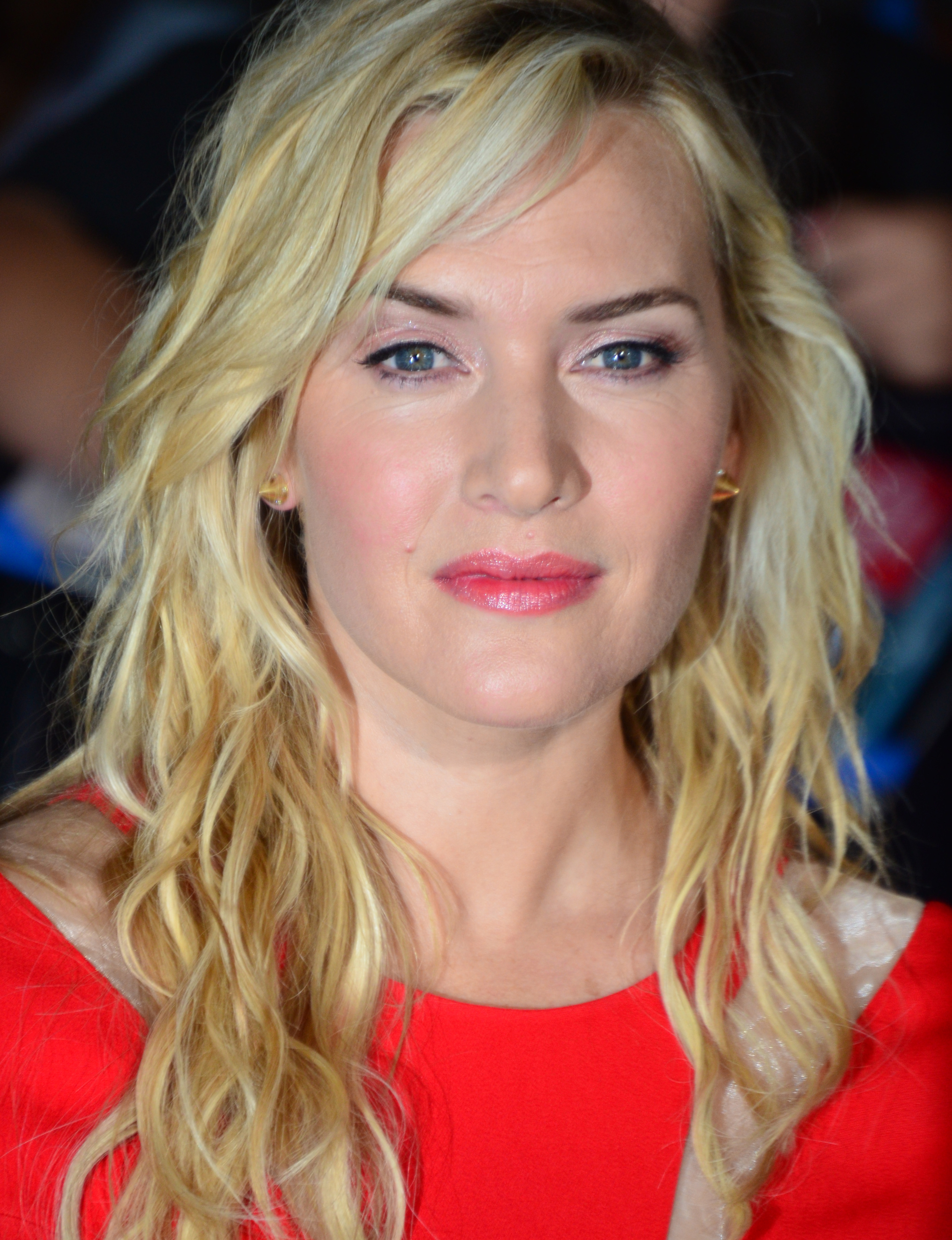
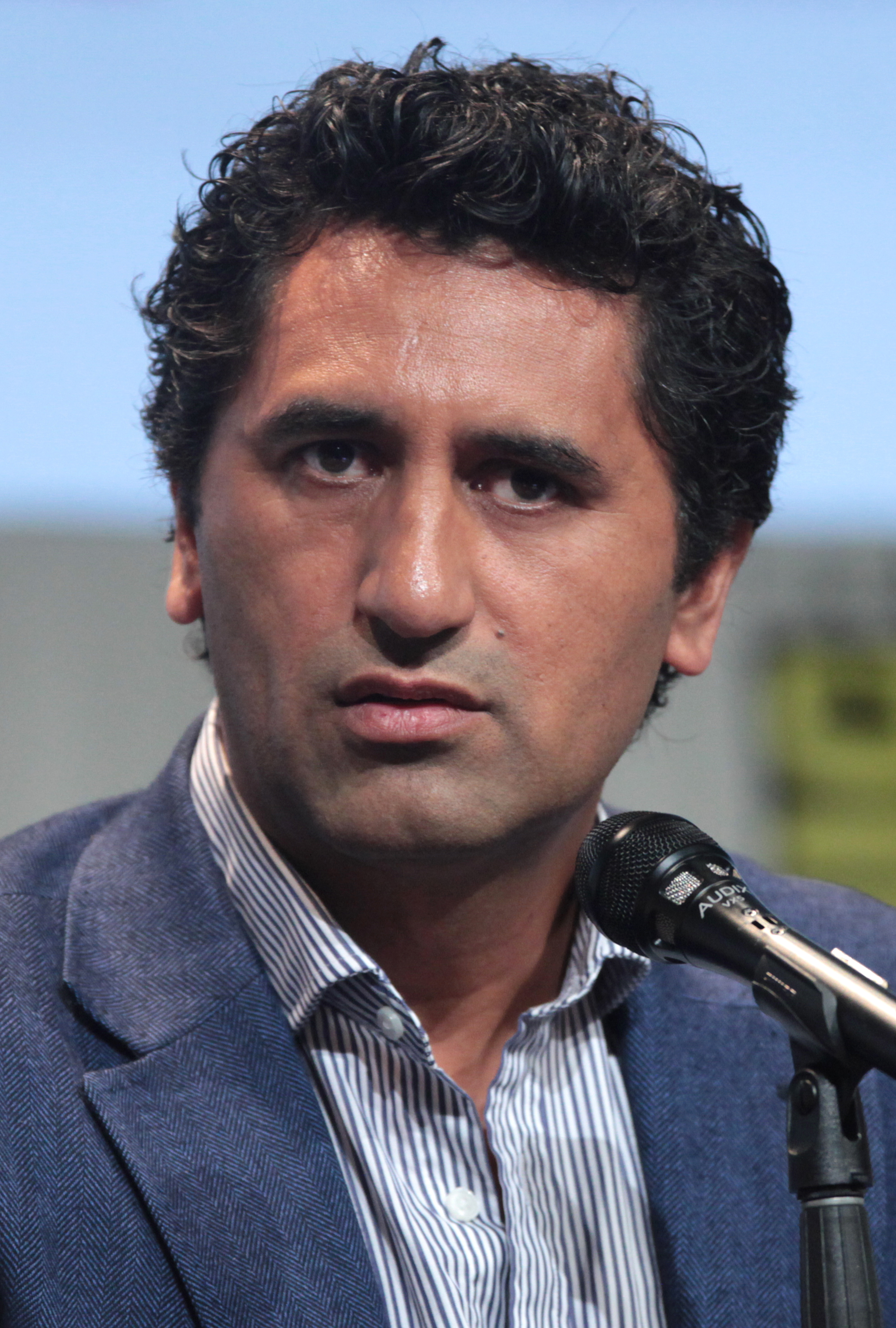
Kate Winslet (left) and Cliff Curtis joined the cast as Na'vi of the Metkayina clan.

In October 2017, it was announced that Giovanni Ribisi would reprise his role of Parker Selfridge in all four sequels. The same month, it was reported that Kate Winslet, who starred in Cameron's Titanic, had joined the cast of Avatar 2, and possibly its sequels, as a character named Ronal. Cameron said that working with Winslet on Titanic had been a highlight of his career, and that the two of them had been hoping to collaborate again someday. (Note: Attributed to multiple references:) However, Winslet had also been hesitant to work with Cameron again because of the rigorous situations he creates for his actors. She felt her role was strong and well-written. Like many other actors playing Na'vi in the film, Winslet had to learn free diving.

In January 2018, Dileep Rao was confirmed to return as Dr. Max Patel. A year later, Edie Falco, Brendan Cowell and Jemaine Clement joined the cast in live-action roles. (Note: Attributed to multiple references:) Marc Maron also auditioned for Clement's part. Edward Norton turned down an undisclosed role in Avatar 2. Joel David Moore's infant son Oliver filmed a brief cameo as an infant Neteyam.

=== Filming ===
==== Motion capture ====
The Way of Water started preliminary shooting on August 15, 2017, with Manhattan Beach, California, as the main shooting location. Principal photography began on September 25, on a $350–$460 million budget. The Way of Water is one of the most expensive films ever made, and was filmed simultaneously with Avatar: Fire and Ash (2025). (Note: Attributed to multiple references:) Some scenes were shot at the industry-standard 24 frames per second, while others were shot at 48 frames per second. The faster frame rate allowed fast-moving objects to remain clearly visible. At one point, the shooting schedule had to be adjusted to allow Sigourney Weaver to film a cameo appearance for the series eight finale of the television series Doc Martin (2004–22).

On November 14, the crew filmed the first underwater motion capture scenes, which featured six of the seven main child actors. The cast and crew did not use scuba sets because the air bubbles from the sets could interfere with the motion capture sensors. When filming underwater scenes, the infrared light normally used in motion capture was absorbed by the water and not registered by the sensors, so ultraviolet light had to be used instead. Two separate motion capture systems were made—one underwater and one above the water—and had to work in sync with one another. The underwater fight scene between Jake and Quaritch was difficult and risky, because the actors were required to perform choking motions, which can cause drowning. Worthington and Lang were overseen by a safety team during the shoot.

While filming one underwater scene, Winslet held her breath for over seven minutes, breaking the record for longest breath hold while shooting a film scene underwater, a record previously held by Tom Cruise while shooting Mission: Impossible – Rogue Nation (2015). On June 8, 2018, Cameron said that 130 days of motion capture had been shot. On November 14, he announced that motion capture filming with the principal cast had been completed.

==== Live action ====
In February 2019, producer Jon Landau said live-action filming for Avatar 2 and 3 would commence in New Zealand in the spring of 2019. On March 17, 2020, Landau announced that filming had been postponed indefinitely due to the COVID-19 pandemic. However, virtual production continued in Manhattan Beach and visual effects work continued at Weta Digital in Wellington. In early May, health and safety protocols for production had been endorsed by the New Zealand government, allowing filming to resume in the country.

On June 1, Cameron, Landau, and at least 55 crew members returned to New Zealand to resume filming. Before they could begin, they had to submit to a two-week government-supervised isolation period at a hotel in Wellington. Avatar 2 and 3 became the first major Hollywood films to resume production after filming was postponed due to the pandemic. (Note: Attributed to multiple references:) Filming resumed on June 16. The production hired 46 New Zealand cast members, including Cliff Curtis and Duane Evans Jr., as well as 114 local stunt performers, 36 apprentices and interns, and almost 800 extras. In September, Cameron stated that live-action filming in New Zealand had been completed. He said that all filming for Avatar 2 was now complete, while 95% of Avatar 3 had been shot. Filming for Avatar 2 had taken more than three years. (Note: Attributed to multiple references:)

In July 2022, the New Zealand Film Commission disclosed that the Avatar sequels had received over NZ$140 million worth of public funding through the country's Screen Production Grant. While ACT party deputy leader Brooke van Velden criticized the government's film subsidy program for allegedly taking public funding from other areas, the Economic Development and Regional Development Minister Stuart Nash argued that New Zealand's film subsidies for major Hollywood productions brought much-needed overseas investment and jobs to the domestic film industry.

=== Visual effects and editing ===
On July 31, 2017, it was announced that Weta Digital had commenced work on the Avatar sequels, which contain many underwater scenes. Since underwater motion capture filming had never been accomplished before, the team spent a year and a half developing a new motion capture system that could be used underwater. (Note: Attributed to multiple references:) Weta's VFX producer David Conley said Avatar 2 was the biggest visual effects project the company had ever undertaken, totalling nearly 3.3 billion thread hours. To manage the enormous amount of data, Weta utilized the services of the cloud storage company Amazon Web Services. Industrial Light & Magic (ILM) assisted with visual effects work for the film.

During the editing process, Cameron removed about ten minutes of "gunplay action" from The Way of Water. He cited mass shootings, such as the Christchurch mosque shootings in New Zealand, as a reason to reduce gun violence in the film.

== Music ==
James Horner, who composed the score for Avatar, had been excited to return for the sequels, but he died in an airplane crash in June 2015. Simon Franglen, who had worked with Cameron and Horner as a producer and arranger on both Titanic and Avatar, was confirmed to be involved with the Avatar sequels in 2021. Horner's Avatar score was used in The Way of Water, in addition to original themes written by Franglen. The soundtrack album for The Way of Water was released on December 16, 2022, by Hollywood Records. An expanded album, featuring ten additional tracks from the film's score, was released four days later.

In November 2022, it was reported that the film would feature an original song titled "Song Chord", performed by Franglen and Zoe Saldaña. The following month, it was announced that the Canadian singer the Weeknd would contribute an original song to the film titled "Nothing Is Lost (You Give Me Strength)", produced by Franglen and the Swedish group Swedish House Mafia.

== Marketing ==
Disney extensively promoted Avatar: The Way of Water across multiple media platforms, including merchandise and theme park attractions. At the 2022 CinemaCon, the title of Avatar: The Way of Water was officially announced and the first teaser trailer was released. During its first 24 hours online, the trailer received 148.6 million views (including 23 million views from China) according to Disney and 20th Century Fox. Lego released four new Avatar-themed sets as part of the promotional campaign.

Eight minutes of the film was screened in 3D at the D23 Expo on September 10, 2022. McFarlane Toys had created several action figures based on characters and creatures from The Way of Water, which were unveiled at the event. A second excerpt from the film was shown during the credits of the Avatar theatrical re-release on September 23. An official full-length trailer was released on November 2 during Good Morning America. (Note: Attributed to multiple references:) Eighteen minutes of footage from the film was shown at the CCXP convention on December 2.

Disney launched an environmental campaign called "Keep Our Oceans Amazing" to support the Nature Conservancy's efforts to protect marine habitats and animal species. A concept art book titled The Art of Avatar: The Way of Water, was made available for pre-order in October 2022, and was set to be released simultaneously with the film. Another book titled Avatar The Way of Water: The Visual Dictionary by Joshua Izzo was released with the film.

Lightstorm Entertainment and Mercedes-Benz revealed a Vision AVTR concept car inspired by the film at the Consumer Electronics Show in 2020. Amazon Echo enabled interactions based on the film for its Alexa virtual assistant. In China, Disney partnered with JD.com and Alipay for advertising, while Razer Inc. launched the Yaqi Orochi V2 Avatar computer mouse. NYX Professional Makeup (owned by L'Oréal) promoted a line of makeup products inspired by the film. Kellogg's distributed an estimated 53 million Avatar-themed packages across its three labels. Motorola Mobility and Deutsche Telekom partnered with Disney to promote the film in Latin America and EMEA respectively.

== Release ==
=== Theatrical ===
==== Initial screening ====
The world premiere of Avatar: The Way of Water was held on December 6, 2022, at the Odeon Luxe Leicester Square in London. The film was released to theaters in some countries on December 14, 2022, and was theatrically released in the United States on December 16 by Disney subsidiary 20th Century Studios. (Note: Attributed to multiple references:) Unlike Avatar, the sequel was released by Disney, which had acquired the entertainment properties of 21st Century Fox in 2019. The Way of Water was released in RealD 3D, Dolby Cinema, IMAX and IMAX 3D formats, and in Dolby Vision. Select showings also had support for a dynamic high frame rate of up to 48 frames per second. The film had one of the widest releases ever for a Disney film, debuting on over 12,000 screens in the United States and Canada and 40,000 internationally.

The 2023 Hollywood Professional Association Tech Retreat revealed that 1,065 individual Digital Cinema Packages (DCPs) were created for the film's theatrical release. This included specific versions of the film presented in formats such as 2D, 3D, HDR, 4K, varying light levels, aspect ratios and various audio formats, as well as 51 subtitled languages and 28 dubbed language variations. Roughly 800 DCPs were reviewed for quality control five days prior to the film's release date. Disney's distribution team invented a new system to create and keep track of the numerous versions, and also created a cloud-based DCP mastering tool.

==== Post-original release ====
In May 2025, it was announced the film would be re-released in theaters on October 3, 2025, including both IMAX and 3D formats, for one week only.

=== Home media ===
In March 2023, The Way of Water was released for digital download with behind-the-scenes featurettes. It was released on June 7, 2023 on Disney+ and Max. Walt Disney Studios Home Entertainment (under the 20th Century Home Entertainment label) released The Way of Water on Ultra HD Blu-ray, Blu-ray 3D, Blu-ray and DVD on June 20. Disney released an expanded "collector's edition" of the film that December. On February 2, 2024, the film became available to stream in variable high frame rate in 3D 4K Dolby Vision on the Disney+ app for visionOS.

Analytics company Samba TV, which gathers viewership data from some smart TVs and content providers, reported that more than 2.6 million U.S. households streamed The Way of Water on Disney+ and Max during its first four days of availability (June 7–11, 2023). Viewership was particularly strong in Portland (+28%), Seattle (+26%), and Sacramento (+26%). Black households (+10%) and Hispanic households (+9%) over-indexed compared to the national average. Nielsen Media Research, which records streaming viewership on some U.S. television screens, subsequently announced that The Way of Water was the ninth most-streamed film of 2023, with 6.4 billion minutes viewed.

== Reception ==
=== Box office ===
Avatar: The Way of Water has grossed $688.5 million in the United States and Canada, and $1.646 billion in other territories, for a worldwide total of $2.334 billion.

It had a domestic opening of $134.1 million and an overseas opening of $307.6 million, thus a worldwide opening weekend of $441.7 million, the eleventh-biggest of all time, and the third largest in the COVID-19 pandemic era, behind Spider-Man: No Way Home ($601 million) and Doctor Strange in the Multiverse of Madness ($452.4 million). IMAX accounted for $48.8 million, the second-highest global weekend ever for a film released in IMAX cinemas. It is the highest-grossing film of 2022, the fourth-highest-grossing film of all time, and the second-highest-grossing film of the 2020s.

It is the fourth film to reach the $1 billion milestone in the pandemic era after Spider-Man: No Way Home, Top Gun: Maverick and Jurassic World Dominion, as well as the sixth-fastest overall to reach the milestone at 14 days. It crossed the $2 billion milestone on January 22, becoming the first film in the pandemic era and the sixth in history to reach the milestone. It is also the second-fastest to gross over $2 billion, reaching the milestone in 40 days. Deadline Hollywood calculated the film's net profit as $531.7 million, accounting for production budgets, marketing, talent participations and other costs; box office grosses and home media revenues placed it first on their list of 2022's "Most Valuable Blockbusters".

==== United States and Canada ====
By December 14, 2022, prior to the film's release in the United States and Canada, Boxoffice Pro projected an opening weekend of $145–179 million, and a total final gross of $574–803 million. The film made $53.2 million on its first day, including $17 million from Thursday night previews. It went on to debut to a $134.1 million weekend, nearly double the original's opening of $77 million, but coming in below expectations while finishing first at the box office. Deadline Hollywood and Variety wrote that strong audience exit scores, the small day-to-day drop, limited competition from other films and the upcoming Christmas holiday all indicated likely strong legs at the box office.

The film made $63.3 million in its second weekend, a drop of 53%, and $95.6 million over the four-day Christmas weekend, remaining atop the box office. Box office analysts partially attributed the December 2022 North American winter storm for the drop. In the third weekend, it grossed $67.4 million for an increase of 6%, and also grossed $88.8 million through the four-day New Year weekend, while becoming the second highest-grossing film of 2022 in the region. It remained the highest-grossing film at the box office throughout its first seven weekends of release, the highest number of consecutive weekends for any film since the original Avatar. It is also the seventh-highest-grossing film of all time in the US and Canada.

==== China ====
On the release day of Avatar: The Way of Water, Tianjin Maoyan Weiying Culture Media estimated that the film would make $357 million (¥2.5 billion) and $100 million in its opening weekend, later revising it down to $222 million (¥1.5 billion). It grossed $57 million in the first week in China, according to Artisan Gateway. This included a gross of $51.3 million during the weekend. The box-office gross of the film was impacted by the recent surge in COVID-19 infections in the country. IMAX meanwhile reported that the film marked its best weekend ever in China, with a $15.8 million opening. In the second weekend, the film grossed $25.9 million, for a drop of 55%, and an increase of 42% during the New Year weekend with $36.9 million. Avatar: The Way of Water ultimately grossed $245 million in China, slightly more than the $202 million that Avatar earned in its initial run.

==== Other territories ====
Outside the US and Canada, the film grossed $307.6 million in 52 countries in its first week of release. The largest openings for the film by the end of the week were in China ($56.8 million), South Korea ($24.9 million), France ($21.7 million), Germany ($19.4 million) and India ($19.2 million). In the second weekend, it grossed $168.6 million for a drop of 42%. In the third weekend, it grossed $186.7 million, an increase of 6% from the previous weekend. In the fourth weekend, it grossed $132.6 million for a drop of 30%, while becoming the highest-grossing film of the pandemic era outside the US and Canada. The five largest-running total countries by February 26, 2023, are China ($249.8 million), France ($148.3 million), Germany ($138.3 million), South Korea ($105 million) and the United Kingdom ($91 million). It became the highest-grossing film of all time in twenty box office territories, including Germany, France, Austria, Turkey and New Zealand.

=== Critical response ===
On the review aggregator website Rotten Tomatoes, 76% of 455 critics' reviews are positive, with an average rating of 7.1/10. The website's consensus reads: "Narratively, it might be fairly standard stuff—but visually speaking, Avatar: The Way of Water is a stunningly immersive experience." Metacritic, which uses a weighted average, assigned the film a score of 67 out of 100, based on 68 critics, indicating "generally favorable" reviews. Audiences polled by CinemaScore gave the film an average grade of "A" on an A+ to F scale, the same as the first Avatar, while PostTrak reported that 91% of audience members gave the film a positive score, with 82% saying they would definitely recommend it.

Positive reviews focused on the visual spectacle of the film, and encouraged seeing it in as large a format as possible. Richard Roeper of the Chicago-Sun Times described the film's visuals as "some of the most dazzling, vibrant, and gorgeous images ever seen on screen". Owen Gleiberman of Variety praised the film as a "dizzyingly spectacular sequel" with "scenes that will make your eyes pop, your head spin and your soul race" using "state-of-the-art 3D". At the same time, he felt the story was overly simplistic and full of clichés", the dialogue was "bare-bones", and the characters had little depth. David Sims of The Atlantic thought The Way of Water would amaze audiences, although he felt it gets off to a slow start. Justin Chang of the Los Angeles Times hailed Cameron as a visionary and praised the film's tenderness and sentimentality. Entertainment Weekly critic Leah Greenblatt said the film had "meticulous world-building as astonishing and enveloping as anything we've ever seen on screen".

Some critics felt the film was excessively long, and the script too insubstantial to justify the length. Anthony Lane of The New Yorker felt the plot moved too slowly, but he applauded the choreography of the action sequences. Writing for The Guardian, Peter Bradshaw was critical of the "scathingly bland plot" and felt the film was visually uninteresting. San Francisco Chronicle reviewer Mick LaSalle praised the film's use of 3D. Robbie Collin of The Telegraph said the film had "no plot, no stakes and atrocious dialogue" and felt that Cameron's creativity was not apparent. Drew Hayden Taylor of the Toronto Star observed that The Way of Water was poorly received by some indigenous peoples in Canada; he also called the film boring and predictable.

=== Accolades ===
At the 95th Academy Awards, Avatar: The Way of Water won Best Visual Effects, and was also nominated for Best Picture, Best Sound, and Best Production Design. Its other nominations include two Annie Awards (winning both), two British Academy Film Awards (winning one), five Critics' Choice Movie Awards (winning one), and two Golden Globe Awards. The National Board of Review and the American Film Institute named The Way of Water one of the ten best films of 2022.

== Thematic analysis ==
Family has been described as the central theme in Avatar: The Way of Water. (Note: Attributed to multiple references:) RogerEbert.com critic Brian Tallerico wrote that some themes in the film echo themes from Cameron's earlier films, including Titanic (1997), The Abyss (1989), Aliens (1986), The Terminator (1984) and Terminator 2: Judgment Day (1991). For example, The Way of Water depicts a character (Jake) who must decide whether to hide from a powerful enemy or stand and fight, which Tallerico said is reminiscent of the Terminator films. Other themes that Tallerico found in The Way of Water include environmentalism and settler colonialism.

== Sequels ==
The Way of Water is the first of four planned sequels to Avatar. Avatar: Fire and Ash started filming simultaneously with this film in New Zealand on September 25, 2017. Cast members from previous films, including Worthington, Saldaña, Lang, Weaver, Pounder, Winslet, Curtis, Ribisi, Moore, Rao, Gerald, Dalton, Bliss, Champion, Bass, and Geljo, have all been announced to return while Oona Chaplin, Michelle Yeoh, and David Thewlis will be playing new characters. (Note: Attributed to multiple references:) The ocean scenes for the sequels were filmed during the production of The Way of Water.

Although the last two sequels have been reportedly greenlit, in a November 2017 interview, Cameron said: "Let's face it, if Avatar 2 and 3 don't make enough money, there's not going to be a 4 and 5." Thewlis later confirmed this in February 2018, stating "they're making 2 and 3, they're gonna see if people go and see them, and then they'll make 4 and 5." Conversely in November 2018, Weaver said, after the first two sequels had completed main photography, that she was currently "busy doing Avatar 4 and 5", which several media outlets interpreted as confirmation that the last two sequels had started filming.

In January 2019, in face of the proposed acquisition of 21st Century Fox by the Walt Disney Company, Disney CEO Bob Iger confirmed that both Avatar 4 and Avatar 5 are being developed but have not been officially greenlit. According to producer Landau in February 2019, Iger may have been misinterpreted. He said that Avatar 4 and 5 "are not only [greenlit]" but also a third of Avatar 4 has already been filmed.

Following the box-office success of The Way of Water, Cameron confirmed that the sequels are effectively greenlit. "It looks like with the momentum that the film has now that we'll easily pass our break even in the next few days, so it looks like I can't wiggle out of this and I'm gonna have to do these other sequels," Cameron said in January 2023, adding: "I know what I'm going to be doing the next six or seven years". It was also confirmed that Brendan Cowell will reprise his role as Captain Mick Scoresby and will also feature the return of Payakan, the Tulkun who befriends Lo'ak. Giovanni Ribisi will reprise his role as Parker Selfridge, with his character having a bigger role in the film after his brief cameo in The Way of Water.

== See also ==
- Impact of the COVID-19 pandemic on cinema
- List of films featuring extraterrestrials
- List of films with the longest production time
- List of highest-grossing films
- List of most expensive films
- List of underwater science fiction works
