= Gary Summers =

American sound re-recording mixer

- Occupation: Sound engineer
- Years active: 1980–present

Gary Summers is an American re-recording mixer.

He has done the sound re-recording on many blockbuster motion pictures including Avatar, Titanic, Terminator 2: Judgment Day, Saving Private Ryan, Transformers: Revenge of the Fallen and Jurassic Park. Summers has won four Academy Awards, an Emmy Award, two BAFTA awards and three C.A.S. Awards.

He got his start working on The Empire Strikes Back and began twenty years working for the Skywalker Sound division of George Lucas's Lucasfilm in Marin County, California. Summers formed Summers Sound Services, Inc. in 2002 and is currently self-employed.

== Academy Awards ==
Summers has won four Academy Awards for Best Sound and has been nominated for eight more:

Wins

- Terminator 2: Judgment Day (1991)
- Jurassic Park (1993)
- Titanic (1997)
- Saving Private Ryan (1998)

Nominated

- Return of the Jedi (1983)
- Indiana Jones and the Last Crusade (1989)
- Backdraft (1991)
- Transformers: Revenge of the Fallen (2009)
- Avatar (2009)
- Transformers: Dark of the Moon (2011)
- 13 Hours: The Secret Soldiers of Benghazi (2016)
- Avatar: The Way of Water (2022)
