= Lady in the Lake (disambiguation) =

Lady in the Lake is a 1947 American film noir

Lady in the Lake may also refer to:

- The Lady in the Lake, a 1943 Raymond Chandler novel; basis for the film
- Lady in the Lake (novel), a 2019 crime novel by Laura Lippman
- Lady in the Lake (TV series), a 2024 television series on Apple TV+ based on Lippman's novel
- "A Lady in the Lake", a 1985 episode of Murder She Wrote
- "The Lady in the Lake" (Agent Carter), a 2016 television episode
- Lady in the Lake trial, a 2005 British murder case
- "East Lancashire Lady in the Lake", a 1999 British-French criminal case
- "Wasdale Lady in the Lake", a name given to British murder victim Margaret Hogg in 1984 before her remains were identified

== See also ==
- Lady of the Lake (disambiguation)
- Lady of the Lake, a character in the Arthurian legend
- Lady in the Water, a 2006 film by M. Night Shyamalan
