= Ecclesiastes =

Book of the Hebrew Bible (450–180 BCE)

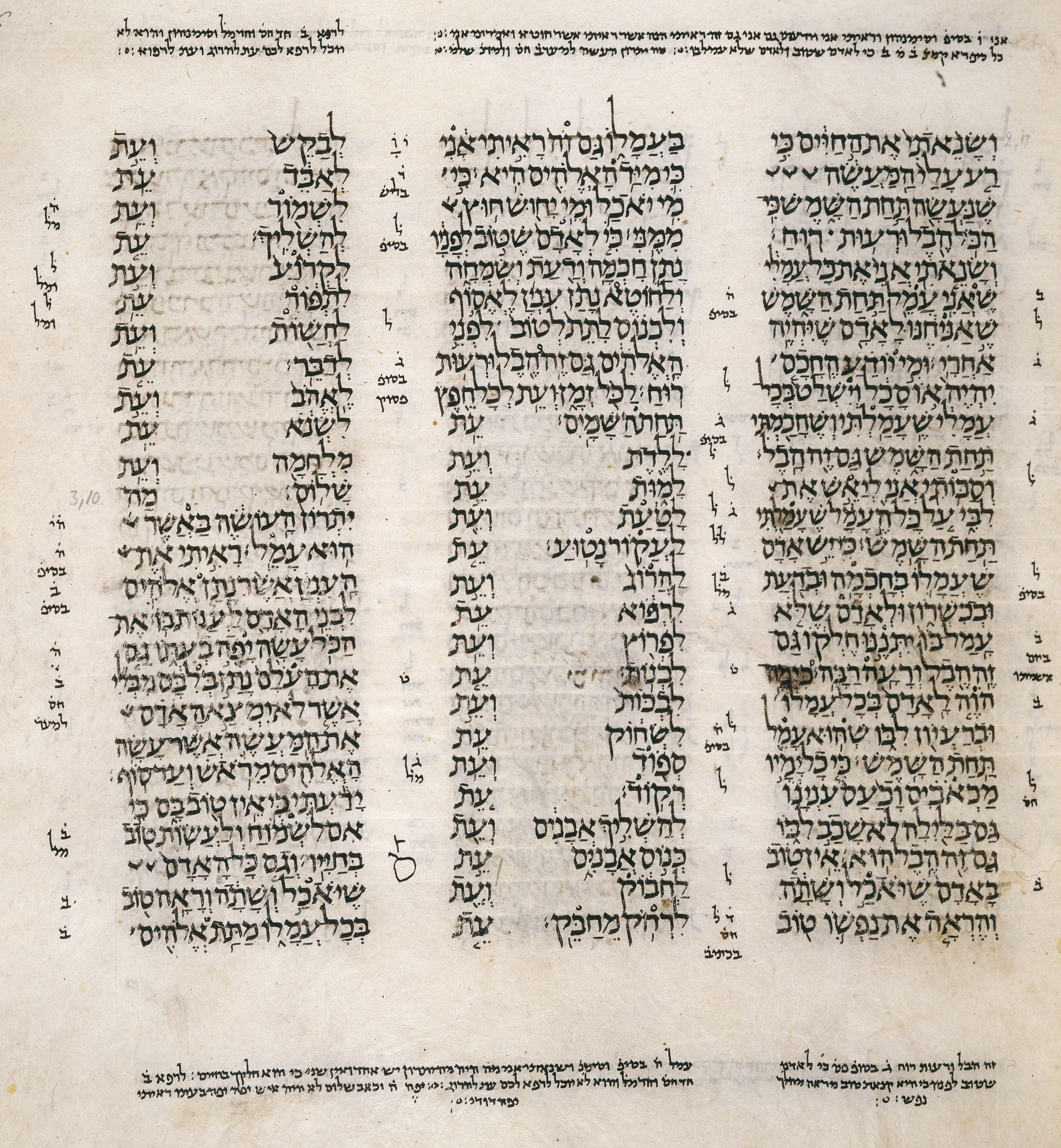
Ecclesiastes 3 in the Leningrad Codex

Ecclesiastes (Note: Biblical Hebrew: קֹהֶלֶת, romanized: Qōheleṯ, Ancient Greek: Ἐκκλησιαστής, romanized: Ekklēsiastēs) (/ɪˌkliːziˈæstiːz/ ih-KLEE-zee-ASS-teez) is one of the Ketuvim ('Writings') of the Hebrew Bible and part of the wisdom literature of the Christian Old Testament. The title commonly used in English is a Latin transliteration of the Greek translation of the Hebrew word קֹהֶלֶת (Kohelet, Koheleth, Qoheleth or Qohelet). An unnamed author introduces "The words of Kohelet, son of David, king in Jerusalem" (1:1) and does not use his own voice again until the final verses Ecclesiastes 12:9–14, where he gives his own thoughts and summarises the statements of Kohelet; the main body of the text is ascribed to Kohelet.

Kohelet proclaims "Vanity of vanities! All is futile!" The Hebrew word hevel, 'vapor' or 'breath', can figuratively mean 'insubstantial', 'vain', 'futile', or 'meaningless'. In some versions, vanity is translated as 'meaningless' to avoid the confusion with the other definition of vanity. Given this, the next verse presents the basic existential question with which the rest of the book is concerned: "What profit can we show for all our toil, toiling under the sun?" This expresses that the lives of both wise and foolish people all end in death. In light of this perceived meaninglessness, he suggests that human beings should enjoy the simple pleasures of daily life, such as eating, drinking, and taking enjoyment in one's work, which are gifts from the hand of God. The book concludes with the injunction to "Fear God and keep his commandments, for that is the duty of all of mankind. Since every deed will God bring to judgment, for every hidden act, whether good or evil."

According to rabbinic tradition, the book was written by King Solomon (reigned c. 970–931 BCE) in his old age, but the presence of Persian loanwords (like פַרְדֵּס (pardes) 'orchard' and פִתְגָּם (pitgam) 'sentence') and Aramaisms points to a date no earlier than c. 450 BCE, while the latest possible date for its composition is 180 BCE.

According to Michael Coogan and other biblical scholars, it is a controversial, unorthodox, and subversive book. (Note: Doubts about its canonicity or its orthodoxy)

== Title ==
Ecclesiastes is a phonetic transliteration of the Greek word Ἐκκλησιαστής (Ekklēsiastēs), which in the Septuagint translates the Hebrew name of its stated author, Kohelet (קֹהֶלֶת). The Greek word derives from ekklesia ('assembly'), as the Hebrew word derives from kahal ('assembly'), but while the Greek word means 'member of an assembly', the meaning of the original Hebrew word it translates is less certain. As Strong's Concordance mentions, it is a female active participle of the verb kahal in its simple (qal) paradigm, a form not used elsewhere in the Bible and which is sometimes understood as active or passive depending on the verb, (Note: As opposed to the hifil form, always active 'to assemble', and niphal form, always passive 'to be assembled', both forms often used in the Bible.) so that Kohelet would mean '(female) assembler' in the active case (recorded as such by Strong's Concordance), and '(female) assembled, member of an assembly' in the passive case (as per the Septuagint translators). According to the majority understanding today, the word is a more general (mishkal, מִשְׁקָל) form rather than a literal participle, and the intended meaning of Kohelet in the text is 'someone speaking before an assembly', hence 'Teacher' or 'Preacher'. This was the position of the Midrash and of Jerome.

Commentators struggle to explain why a man was given an apparently feminine name. According to Isaiah di Trani, "He authored this work in his old age, when he was weak like a woman, and therefore he received a feminine name," an opinion likewise held by Johann Simonis. According to Salmon ben Jeroham, "This is because, even as a woman births and raises children, Qoheleth revealed and organized wisdom". According to Yefet ben Ali, and later, Abraham ibn Ezra and Joseph Ibn Kaspi, "He ascribed this activity to his wisdom, and because Wisdom is female, he used a feminine name." This last opinion is accepted by a wide variety of modern scholars, including Christian David Ginsburg.

== Structure ==
Ecclesiastes is presented as the biography of "Kohelet" or "Qoheleth"; his story is framed by the voice of the narrator, who refers to Kohelet in the third person and praises his wisdom but reminds the reader that wisdom has its limitations and is not man's primary concern. Kohelet reports what he planned, did, experienced, and thought, but his journey to knowledge is, in the end, incomplete; the reader is not only to hear Kohelet's wisdom but to observe his journey towards understanding and acceptance of life's frustrations and uncertainties: the journey itself is important.

The Jerusalem Bible divides the book into two parts: Ecclesiastes 1:4–6:12 and chapters 7 to 12, each commencing with a separate prologue.

Few attempts to uncover an underlying structure to Ecclesiastes have met with any widespread endorsement. Among them, the following is one of the more influential:

- Title (1:1)
- Initial poem (1:2–11)
- I: Kohelet's investigation of life (1:12–6:9)
- II: Kohelet's conclusions (6:10–11:6)
  - Introduction (6:10–12)
  - A: Humankind cannot discover what is good for it to do (7:1–8:17)
  - B: Humankind does not know what will come after it (9:1–11:6)
- Concluding poem (11:7–12:8)
- Epilogue (12:9–14)

Despite the acceptance by some of this structure, there have been many criticisms, such as that of Fox: "[Addison G. Wright's] proposed structure has no more effect on interpretation than a ghost in the attic. A literary or rhetorical structure should not merely 'be there'; it must do something. It should guide readers in recognizing and remembering the author's train of thought."

Verse 1:1 is a superscription, the ancient equivalent of a title page: it introduces the book as "the words of Kohelet, son of David, king in Jerusalem."

Most, though not all, modern commentators regard the epilogue (12:9–14) as an addition by a later scribe. Some have identified other statements as further additions intended to make the book more religiously orthodox (e.g., affirming God's justice and the need for piety).

It has been proposed that the text is composed of three distinct voices. The first belongs to Qohelet-as-prophet, the "true voice of wisdom", which speaks in the first person, recounting wisdom through his own experience. The second voice is of Qoheleth-the-king (of Jerusalem), who is more didactic and thus speaks primarily in second-person imperative statements. The third voice is that of the epilogist (i.e., the writer of the epilogue), who speaks proverbially in the third person. The epilogist is most identified in the book's first and final verses. Kyle R. Greenwood suggests that Ecclesiastes should be read as a dialogue between these voices following this structure.

== Summary ==
The ten-verse introduction in verses 1:2–11 are the words of the frame narrator; they set the mood for what is to follow. Kohelet's message is that all is meaningless. This distinction first appeared in the commentaries of Samuel ibn Tibbon (d. 1230) and Aaron ben Joseph of Constantinople (d. 1320).

To every thing there is a season, and a time to every purpose under the heaven:
A time to be born, and a time to die; a time to plant, and a time to pluck up that which is planted;
A time to kill, and a time to heal; a time to break down, and a time to build up;
A time to weep, and a time to laugh; a time to mourn, and a time to dance;
A time to cast away stones, and a time to gather stones together;
A time to embrace, and a time to refrain from embracing;
A time to get, and a time to lose; a time to keep, and a time to cast away;
A time to rend, and a time to sew; a time to keep silence, and a time to speak;
A time to love, and a time to hate; a time of war, and a time of peace.

— (King James Version 3:1–8)

After the introduction come the words of Kohelet. As king, he has experienced everything and done everything, but concludes that nothing is ultimately reliable, as death levels all. Kohelet states that the only good is to partake of life in the present, for enjoyment is from the hand of God. Everything is ordered in time and people are subject to time in contrast to God's eternal character. The world is filled with injustice, which only God will adjudicate. God and humans do not belong in the same realm, and it is therefore necessary to have a right attitude before God. People should enjoy, but should not be greedy; no one knows what is good for humanity; righteousness and wisdom escape humanity. Kohelet reflects on the limits of human power: all people face death, and death is better than life, but people should enjoy life when they can, for a time may come when no one can. The world is full of risk: he gives advice on living with risk, both political and economic. Kohelet's words finish with imagery of nature languishing and humanity marching to the grave.

The frame narrator returns with an epilogue: the words of the wise are hard, but they are applied as the shepherd applies goads and pricks to his flock. The ending of the book sums up its message: "Fear God and keep his commandments for God will bring every deed to judgment." Some scholars suggest 12:13–14 were an addition by a more orthodox author than the original writer (that the epilogue was added later was first proposed by Samuel ibn Tibbon); others think it is likely the work of the original author.

== Composition ==
=== Title, date and author ===
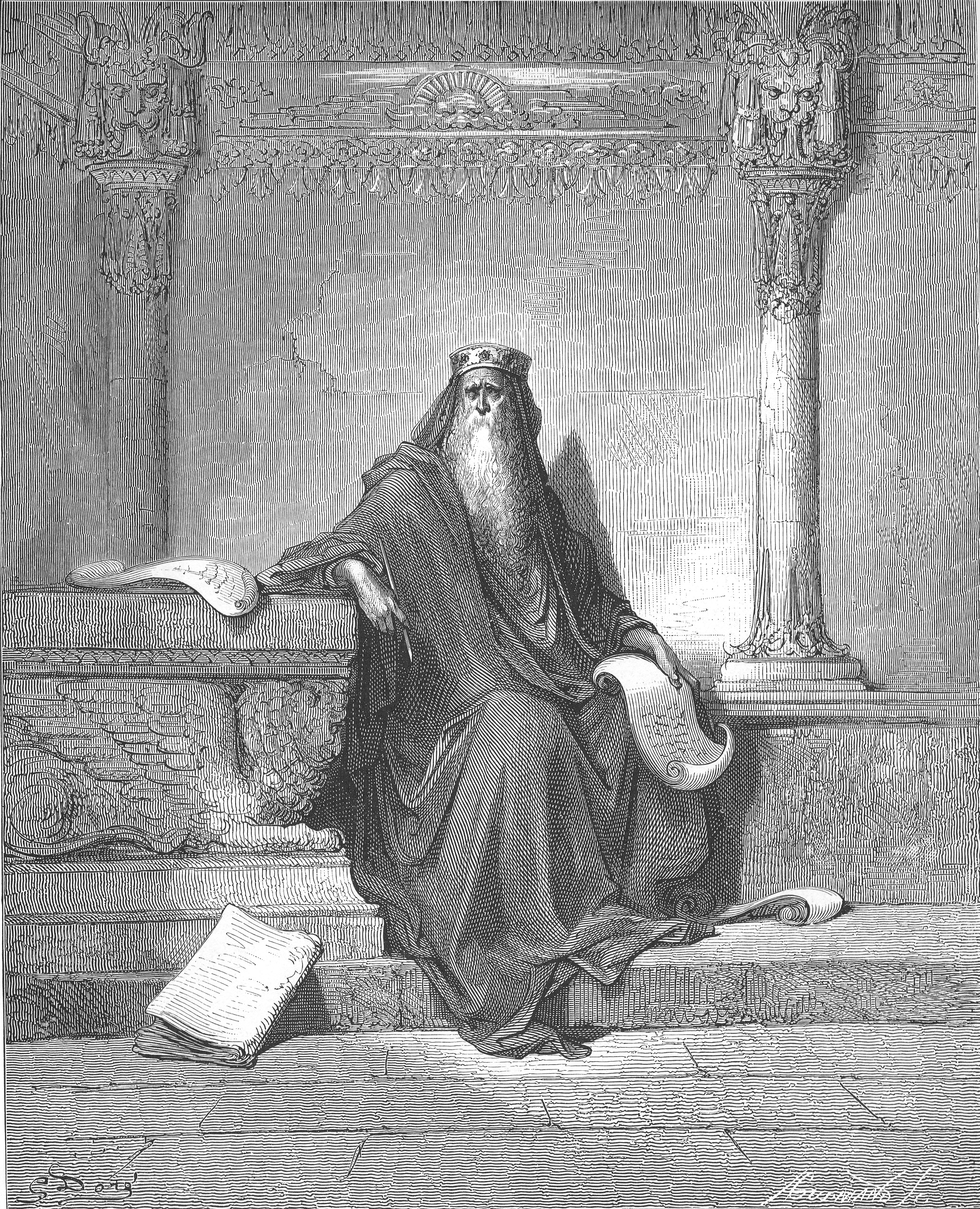
King Solomon in Old Age by Gustave Doré (1866), a depiction of the purported author of Ecclesiastes, according to rabbinic tradition

The book takes its name from the Greek ekklēsiastēs, a translation of the title by which the central figure refers to himself: "Qohelet", meaning something like "one who convenes or addresses a qahal". According to rabbinic tradition, Ecclesiastes was written by King Solomon in his old age (an alternative tradition that "Hezekiah and his colleagues wrote Isaiah, Proverbs, the Song of Songs and Ecclesiastes" probably means simply that the book was edited under Hezekiah), but critical scholars have long rejected the idea of a pre-exilic origin. In Ecclesiastes, the author never says the name "Solomon," but he does say that he is the son of David, who is the king in Jerusalem, and that he is fantastically rich and wise. In other words, he is claiming to be Solomon without using his name." In the early Christian tradition, Gregory of Nyssa wrote that it was written by another Solomon and Didymus the Blind wrote that it was probably written by several authors.

The presence of Persian loanwords and numerous Aramaisms points to a date no earlier than about 450 BCE, while the latest possible date for its composition is 180 BCE, when the Jewish writer Ben Sira quotes from it. The dispute as to whether Ecclesiastes belongs to the Achaemenid or Hellenistic periods (i.e., the earlier or later part of this period) revolves around the degree of Hellenization (influence of Greek culture and thought) present in the book. Scholars arguing for a Persian date (c. 450–330 BCE) hold that there is a complete lack of Greek influence; those who argue for a Hellenistic date (c. 330–180 BCE) argue that it shows internal evidence of Greek thought and social setting.

Also unresolved is whether the author and narrator of Kohelet are identical. Ecclesiastes regularly switches between third-person quotations of Kohelet and first-person reflections on Kohelet's words, which would indicate the book was written as a commentary on Kohelet's parables rather than a personally-authored repository of his sayings. Some scholars have argued that the third-person narrative structure is an artificial literary device along the lines of Uncle Remus, although the description of the Kohelet in 12:8–14 seems to favour a historical person whose thoughts are presented by the narrator. It has been argued, however, that the question has no theological importance; one scholar (Roland Murphy) has commented that Kohelet himself would have regarded the time and ingenuity put into interpreting his book as "one more example of the futility of human effort."

=== Genre and setting ===
Ecclesiastes has taken its literary form from the Middle Eastern tradition of the fictional autobiography, in which a character, often a king, relates his experiences and draws lessons from them, often self-critical: Kohelet likewise identifies himself as a king, speaks of his search for wisdom, relates his conclusions, and recognises his limitations. The book belongs to the category of wisdom literature, the body of biblical writings which give advice on life, together with reflections on its problems and meanings—other examples include the Book of Job, Proverbs, and some of the Psalms. Ecclesiastes differs from the other biblical Wisdom books in being deeply skeptical of the usefulness of wisdom itself. Ecclesiastes in turn influenced the deuterocanonical works, Wisdom of Solomon and Sirach, both of which contain vocal rejections of the Ecclesiastical philosophy of futility.

Wisdom was a popular genre in the ancient world, where it was cultivated in scribal circles and directed towards young men who would take up careers in high officialdom and royal courts; there is strong evidence that some of these books, or at least sayings and teachings, were translated into Hebrew and influenced the Book of Proverbs, and the author of Ecclesiastes was probably familiar with examples from Egypt and Mesopotamia. He may also have been influenced by Greek philosophy, specifically the schools of Stoicism, which held that all things are fated, and Epicureanism, which held that happiness was best pursued through the quiet cultivation of life's simpler pleasures.

=== Canonicity ===
Though many earlier theologians (including Augustine) raised no concerns regarding Ecclesiastes' position or consistency within the canon, the book's presence in the Bible has been considered a puzzle to some modern scholars. One argument advanced in earlier times was that the name of Solomon carried enough authority to ensure its inclusion; however, other works which appeared with Solomon's name were excluded despite being more orthodox than Ecclesiastes. Another was that the words of the epilogue, in which the reader is told to fear God and keep his commandments, made it orthodox; but all later attempts to find anything in the rest of the book that would reflect this orthodoxy have failed. A modern suggestion treats the book as a dialogue in which different statements belong to different voices, with Kohelet himself answering and refuting unorthodox opinions, but there are no explicit markers for this in the book, as there are (for example) in the Book of Job.

Yet another suggestion is that Ecclesiastes is simply the most extreme example of a tradition of skepticism, but none of the proposed examples match Ecclesiastes for a sustained denial of faith and doubt in the goodness of God. Martin A. Shields, in his 2006 book The End of Wisdom: A Reappraisal of the Historical and Canonical Function of Ecclesiastes, summarized that "In short, we do not know why or how this book found its way into such esteemed company".

== Themes ==
Some scholars, including Michael Fox and Benjamin Berger, have interpreted Ecclesiastes as expressing ideas associated with absurdism. In his 1989 book Qohelet and His Contradictions, Fox argues that the Hebrew word hebel, traditionally translated as "vanity" or "futility," is better understood as "absurd," drawing on Albert Camus' philosophical concept of the absurd to explain the apparent conflict between human expectations and reality. According to Martin Hengel, the author has a Greek spirit or Hellenistic outlook.

Scholars disagree about the themes of Ecclesiastes: whether it is positive and life-affirming, or deeply pessimistic; whether it is coherent or incoherent, insightful or confused, orthodox or heterodox; whether the ultimate message of the book is to copy Kohelet, "the wise man," or to avoid his errors. At times, Kohelet raises deep questions; he "doubted every aspect of religion, from the very ideal of righteousness, to the by now traditional idea of divine justice for individuals". Some passages of Ecclesiastes seem to contradict other portions of the Hebrew Bible, and even itself. The Talmud even suggests that the rabbis considered censoring Ecclesiastes due to its seeming contradictions. One suggestion for resolving the contradictions is to read the book as the record of Kohelet's quest for knowledge: opposing judgments (e.g., "the dead are better off than the living" (4:2) vs. "a living dog is better off than a dead lion" (9:4)) are therefore provisional, and it is only at the conclusion that the verdict is delivered (11–12:7). On this reading, Kohelet's sayings are goads, designed to provoke dialogue and reflection in his readers, rather than to reach premature and self-assured conclusions.

The subjects of Ecclesiastes are the pain and frustration engendered by observing and meditating on the distortions and inequities pervading the world, the uselessness of human ambition, and the limitations of worldly wisdom and righteousness. The phrase "under the sun" appears twenty-nine times in connection with these observations; all this coexists with a firm belief in God, whose power, justice, and unpredictability are sovereign. History and nature move in cycles so that all events are predictable and unchangeable, and life, without the Sun, has no meaning or purpose: the wise man and the man who does not study wisdom will both die and be forgotten: man should be reverent (i.e., fear God), but in this life it is best to enjoy God's gifts simply.

== Usage ==
=== Judaism ===
In Judaism, Ecclesiastes is read either on Shemini Atzeret (by Yemenites, Italians, some Sephardim, and the mediaeval French Jewish rite) or on the Shabbat of the intermediate days of Sukkot (by Ashkenazim). If there is no intermediate Shabbat of Sukkot, Ashkenazim too read it on Shemini Atzeret (or, in Israel, on the first Shabbat of Sukkot). It is read on Sukkot as a reminder to not get too caught up in the festivities of the holiday and to carry over the happiness of Sukkot to the rest of the year by telling the listeners that, without God, life is meaningless.

The final poem of Kohelet has been interpreted in the Targum, Talmud and Midrash, and by the rabbis Rashi, Rashbam and ibn Ezra, as an allegory of old age.

=== Catholicism ===
Ecclesiastes has been cited in the writings of past and current Catholic Church leaders. For example, Doctors of the Church have cited Ecclesiastes. Augustine of Hippo cited Ecclesiastes in Book XX of City of God. Jerome wrote a commentary on Ecclesiastes. Thomas Aquinas cited Ecclesiastes ("The number of fools is infinite.") in his Summa Theologica.

The 20th-century Catholic theologian and cardinal-elect Hans Urs von Balthasar discussed Ecclesiastes in his work on theological aesthetics, The Glory of the Lord. He describes Qoheleth as "a critical transcendentalist avant la lettre", whose God is distant from the world, and whose kairos is a "form of time which is itself empty of meaning". For Balthasar, the role of Ecclesiastes in the Biblical canon is to represent the "final dance on the part of wisdom, [the] conclusion of the ways of man", a logical end-point to the unfolding of human wisdom in the Old Testament that paves the way for the advent of the New.

The book continues to be cited by recent popes, including John Paul II and Francis. John Paul II, in his general audience of October 20, 2004, called the author of Ecclesiastes "an ancient biblical sage" whose description of death "makes frantic clinging to earthly things completely pointless". Pope Francis cited Ecclesiastes in his address on September 9, 2014. Speaking of vain people, he said, "How many Christians live for appearances? Their life seems like a soap bubble."

== Similarity to other religions ==
The thought and language of Ecclesiastes bears certain similarities to that of the Daode Jing, the foundational text of Daoism, traditionally attributed to the 5th century BCE. It also has similarities to Buddhist thought, such as the Four Noble Truths about suffering.

== Influence on Western literature ==
Ecclesiastes has had a deep influence on Western literature. It contains several phrases that have resonated in British and American culture, such as "eat, drink and be merry", "nothing new under the sun", "a time to be born and a time to die", and "vanity of vanities; all is vanity". American novelist Thomas Wolfe wrote: "[O]f all I have ever seen or learned, that book seems to me the noblest, the wisest, and the most powerful expression of man's life upon this earth—and also the highest flower of poetry, eloquence, and truth. I am not given to dogmatic judgments in the matter of literary creation, but if I had to make one I could say that Ecclesiastes is the greatest single piece of writing I have ever known, and the wisdom expressed in it the most lasting and profound."

- The opening of William Shakespeare's Sonnet 59 references Ecclesiastes 1:9–10.
- Line 23 of T. S. Eliot's The Waste Land alludes to Ecclesiastes 12:5.
- Christina Rossetti's "One Certainty" quotes from Ecclesiastes 1:2–9.
- Leo Tolstoy's Confession describes how the reading of Ecclesiastes affected his life.
- The historical novel The Egyptian by Mika Waltari serves as the narrator's autobiographical meditation on the inherent meaningless of existence and the constancy of human nature akin to the Ecclesiastes. Numerous passages and forms of figurative speech from the biblical book are paraphrased across the novel, such as Ecclesiastes 1:9-10 and 1:18.
- Robert Burns' "Address to the Unco Guid" begins with a verse appeal to Ecclesiastes 7:16.
- The title of Ernest Hemingway's first novel The Sun Also Rises comes from Ecclesiastes 1:5.
- The title of Edith Wharton's novel The House of Mirth was taken from Ecclesiastes 7:4 ("The heart of the wise is in the house of mourning; but the heart of fools is in the house of mirth.").
- John Steinbeck's The Grapes of Wrath (1939) quotes from Ecclesiastes 4:9–12, "Two are better than one, because they have a good reward for their..." in chapter 28 (570–571).
- The title of Laura Lippman's novel Every Secret Thing and that of its film adaptation come from Ecclesiastes 12:14 ("For God shall bring every work into judgment, with every secret thing, whether it be good, or whether it be evil.").
- The main character in George Bernard Shaw's short story The Adventures of the Black Girl in Her Search for God meets Koheleth, "known to many as Ecclesiastes".
- The title of Henry James's novel The Golden Bowl is taken from Ecclesiastes 12:6.
- The title and theme of George R. Stewart's post-apocalyptic novel Earth Abides is from Ecclesiastes 1:4.
- In the dystopian novel Fahrenheit 451, Ray Bradbury's main character, Montag, memorizes much of Ecclesiastes and Revelation in a world where books are forbidden and burned
- The passage in chapter 3, with its repetition of "A time to ..." has been used as a title in many other cases, including the novels A Time to Dance by Melvyn Bragg and A Time to Kill by John Grisham, the records ...And a Time to Dance by Los Lobos and A Time to Love by Stevie Wonder, and films A Time to Love and a Time to Die, A Time to Live and A Time to Kill.
- The lyrics of the 1959 song "Turn! Turn! Turn!" by Pete Seeger, and covered in a 1965 Billboard Hot 100 number one single by the Byrds, are taken almost verbatim from the first eight verses of the third chapter.
- The opening quote in the movie Platoon by Oliver Stone is taken from Ecclesiastes 11:9.
- The opening quote in the movie Gattaca by Andrew Niccol is taken from Ecclesiastes 7:13.
- The essay "Politics and the English Language" by George Orwell uses Ecclesiastes 9:11 as an example of clear and vivid writing, and "translates" it into "modern English of the worst sort" to demonstrate common failings of the latter.
- The opening pages of Jean Baudrillard's Simulacra and Simulation misquote Ecclesiastes.
- The main character of Terry Gilliam's movie The Zero Theorem, Qohen Leth, is inspired by Qohelet.

== See also ==
- "A Rose for Ecclesiastes" – 1963 short story by Roger Zelazny
- Q, novel by Luther Blissett – Novel by Luther Blissett
- The Song
- Vanitas – Genre of symbolic art
- Vier ernste Gesänge – Final song cycle composed by Johannes Brahms

== General and cited references ==
- Bartholomew, Craig G. (2009). Ecclesiastes. Baker Academic. ISBN 978-0-8010-2691-1.
- Brettler, Mark Zvi (2007). "The Poetical and Wisdom Books". In Coogan, Michael D. (ed.). The New Oxford Annotated Bible (3rd ed.). Oxford University Press. ISBN 978-0-19-528880-3.
- Brown, William P. (2011). Ecclesiastes: Interpretation: A Bible Commentary for Teaching and Preaching. Westminster John Knox Press. ISBN 978-0-664-23824-7.
- Christianson, Eric S. (2007). Ecclesiastes Through the Centuries. Wiley-Blackwell. ISBN 978-0-631-22529-4.
- Diderot, Denis (1752). "Canon". The Encyclopedia of Diderot & d'Alembert Collaborative Translation Project. Translated by Susan Emanuel. hdl:2027/spo.did2222.0000.566. Trans. of "Canon", Encyclopédie ou Dictionnaire raisonné des sciences, des arts et des métiers, vol. 2. Paris, 1752.
- Enns, Peter (2011). Ecclesiastes. Eerdmans. ISBN 978-0-8028-6649-3.
- Fox, Michael V. (2004). The JPS Bible Commentary: Ecclesiastes. Jewish Publication Society. ISBN 978-0-8276-0965-5.
- Gilbert, Christopher (2009). A Complete Introduction to the Bible: A Literary and Historical Introduction to the Bible. Paulist Press. ISBN 978-0-8091-4552-2.
- Hecht, Jennifer Michael (2003). Doubt: A History. New York: HarperCollins. ISBN 978-0-06-009795-0.
- Ingram, Doug (2006). Ambiguity in Ecclesiastes. Continuum. ISBN 978-0-567-02711-5.
- Longman, Tremper (1998). The Book of Ecclesiastes. Eerdmans. ISBN 978-0-8028-2366-3.
- Ricasoli, Corinna, ed. (2018). The Living Dead: Ecclesiastes Through Art. Ferdinand Schöningh. ISBN 978-3-506-73276-7.
- Seow, C. L. (2007). "Ecclesiastes". In Coogan, Michael D. (ed.). The New Oxford Annotated Bible (3rd ed.). Oxford University Press. ISBN 978-0-19-528880-3.
- Shields, Martin A. (2006). The End of Wisdom: A Reappraisal of the Historical and Canonical Function of Ecclesiastes. Eisenbrauns. ISBN 978-1-57506-102-3.
- Smith, James E. (August 2007). The Wisdom Literature and Psalms. College Press. ISBN 978-0-89900-954-4.
- Weeks, Stuart (25 January 2007). Barton, John; Muddiman, John (eds.). The Oxford Bible Commentary. Oxford University Press. ISBN 978-0-19-927718-6.
- Wright, Robert (2014). Proverbs, Ecclesiastes, Song of Solomon. InterVarsity Press. ISBN 978-0-8308-9734-6.

Ecclesiastes Wisdom literature
| Preceded by Lamentations | Hebrew Bible | Succeeded by Esther |
| Preceded by Proverbs | Christian; Old Testament | Succeeded by Song of Songs |
