= Every Secret Thing =

Every Secret Thing may refer to:

- Every Secret Thing (Hearst book), a memoir by Patty Hearst
- Every Secret Thing (novel), a 2004 crime novel by Laura Lippman
- Every Secret Thing (film), a 2014 American crime film based on the novel
