= Rebecca Chance =

English freelance journalist and novelist (1966–2026)

Lauren Henderson
- Born: Lauren Rebecca Milne Henderson; 30 September 1966; Hampstead, London, England
- Died: 10 March 2026 (aged 59)
- Education: North London Collegiate School, Cambridge University
- Occupation: Novelist
- Spouse: Greg Stroud
- Writing career
- Genres: Chick lit, Tart Noir, mystery, young adult fiction

Lauren Rebecca Milne Henderson (30 September 1966 – 10 March 2026), also known by her pen name Rebecca Chance, was an English freelance journalist and novelist. Her books include thrillers, bonkbusters, chick lit, mysteries, Tart Noir, romantic comedies, and young adult. Between 1996 and 2011 Henderson published 17 books under her own name. She began writing as Rebecca Chance in 2009, and later wrote novels exclusively as Rebecca Chance.

== Life and career ==
Lauren Rebecca Milne Henderson was born in Hampstead, London on 30 September 1966. She attended North London Collegiate School (the model for Wakefield Hall in the Scarlett Wakefield "Kiss" series) and then St Paul’s Girls' School (the model for St Tabby’s). She then studied English Literature at Cambridge University.

Henderson worked as a journalist for newspapers and music magazines including the New Statesman, Marxism Today, The Observer and Lime Lizard (an independent music magazine). She then moved to Tuscany to write books and learn Italian. After eight years, she moved to Manhattan. Her experiences in the New York dating scene gave her the inspiration for the non-fiction dating book, Jane Austen's Guide to Dating (Hyperion Books, 2005).

With Sparkle Hayter and Katy Munger, Henderson created Tart Noir, the website. She later edited Tart Noir, the anthology, with Stella Duffy. She has been credited as the founder and godmother of the style.

She also wrote for UK-based publications, including Grazia, Cosmopolitan, The Guardian, the Mail on Sunday, and The Telegraph.

Henderson's books have been translated into 20 languages. She participated at literary and crime fiction festivals in the US, UK, and Australia, including being the International Guest Speaker and giving the opening address at the first SheKilda festival in 2001 in St Kilda. In 2010, Henderson interviewed Lindsey Davis for the Italian Cultural Institute’s reading series; she also interviewed Davis in 2011 at Crimefest in Bristol.

Henderson is featured in British Crime Writing: An Encyclopaedia, published in 2008 and edited by Barry Forshaw, and contributed an entry on Peter O’Donnell, author of the Modesty Blaise caper thrillers. She was the only author to have contributed two essays to the 2012 anthology Books to Die For (edited by John Connolly and Declan Burke), one on Agatha Christie’s Endless Night (as Lauren Henderson) and another on Dorothy L Sayers’s Have His Carcase (as Rebecca Chance).

On 28 October 2014, the New York Times published "Murder, They Wrote", a travel article written by Laura Lippman and Rebecca Chance about a trip on the Orient Express.

Henderson died in early March 2026, at the age of 59. She had been ill for many years, and was separated from her husband.

== Novels ==
=== Glamorous thrillers and bonkbusters ===
Under the alias Rebecca Chance, Henderson wrote ten novels and a companion ebook of short stories published by Simon & Schuster

Rebecca Chance's novels are all standalones, but they include references to previous characters.

- Divas (2009)
- Bad Girls (2010)
- Bad Sisters (2011)
- Killer Heels (2012)
- Bad Angels (2012)
- Killer Queens (2013)
- Bad Brides (2014)
- Mile High (2015)
- Killer Diamonds (2016)
- Killer Affair (2017)

Killer Heels, Bad Angels, Killer Queens, and Bad Brides were all on the Sunday Times bestseller list.

In 2014, she moved to Pan Macmillan with a three-book deal.

=== Sam Jones mystery series ===
Henderson wrote seven novels in her Sam Jones mystery series, published in the UK by Random House and in the US by Crown. This series has been optioned by Freemantle Media/Sandbar Productions. In 2015 and 2016 Fahrenheit Press, a newly-formed publisher founded by self-styled 'punk publisher' Chris McVeigh, republished all seven of the "tart noir" series in eBook format.

1. Dead White Female (Hodder & Stoughton, 1995; Fahrenheit Press, 2016)
2. Too Many Blondes (Hodder & Stoughton, 1996; Fahrenheit Press, 2016)
3. (The) Black Rubber Dress (Arrow, 1997; Crown, 1999; Fahrenheit Press, 2015)
4. Freeze My Margarita (Arrow, 1998; Crown, 2000; Fahrenheit Press, 2016)
5. The Strawberry Tattoo (Arrow, 1999; Crown, 2000; Fahrenheit Press, 2016)
6. Chained! (Arrow, 2001; Three Rivers, 2000; Fahrenheit Press, 2016)
7. Pretty Boy (Arrow, 2002; Three Rivers, 2002; Fahrenheit Press, 2016)

=== Young adult ===
The Kiss/Scarlett Wakefield mystery series is published by Delacorte:

1. Kiss Me Kill Me (2008)

Kiss Me Kill Me was nominated for an Anthony Award for Best YA Novel in 2009.

1. Kisses and Lies (2009)
2. Kiss In The Dark (2010)
3. Kiss of Death (2011)

The Italian series is also published by Delacorte:

- Flirting in Italian (2013)
- Kissing in Italian (2014)

=== Romantic comedies ===
- My Lurid Past (2003)
- Don't Even Think About It (2004)
- Exes Anonymous (2005)

== Non-fiction ==
- Jane Austen's Guide to Dating (2005)

Jane Austen's Guide to Dating has been optioned as a feature film by Martien Holdings/Millennium Films.

- Books To Die For (contributor)

== Anthologies ==
- Girls Night In (contributor) (2004)
- Tart Noir (editor) (2002)

== See also ==
- Carole Matthews
- Rachel Vail
