= Informant (disambiguation) =

An informant is a person who provides privileged information to an agency.

Informant may also refer to:

- Informant (linguistics), a native speaker who provides information about their language for linguistics study
- Informant (psychiatry), a third party who can report on a psychiatric case for a doctor
- Informant (statistics), the gradient of the log-likelihood function, also known as the score (function).

== See also ==
- Informer (disambiguation)
- The Informant (disambiguation)
