= Informer (disambiguation) =

An informer, or informant, is a person who provides privileged information to an agency.

Informer may also refer to:

- The Sub-Saharan Informer, a Pan-African weekly newspaper
- Informer (newspaper), a Serbian daily
- "Informer" (song), a 1992 song by Snow from 12 Inches of Snow
- Common informer, a historical concept in English law abolished in 1951
- The Informer (O'Flaherty novel), a 1925 novel by Liam O'Flaherty
- The Informer (Takagi novel), a 1965 novel by Akimitsu Takagi
- The Informers, a 1994 short story anthology
- Informer Computer Terminals, a defunct computer terminal company
- The Washington Informer, an African-American weekly newspaper in Washington, D.C.

== Film and television ==
- The Informer (1912 film), an American dramatic short directed by D. W. Griffith
- The Informer (1929 film), a British dramatic part-talkie directed by Arthur Robison, based on the Liam O'Flaherty novel
- The Informer (1935 film), an American drama by John Ford, also based on the Liam O'Flaherty novel
- The Informers (1963 film), a British crime film by Ken Annakin, released in the U.S. as Underworld Informers
- The Informer (TV series), a British series broadcast in 1966 and 1967 featuring Ian Hendry
- The Informer (1980 film), a Hong Kong action drama from Shaw Brothers Studio
- The Informers (2008 film), an American ensemble drama by Gregor Jordan, based on the Bret Easton Ellis short stories
- Informer (TV series), a British series broadcast in 2018
- The Informer (2019 film), an American drama by Andrea Di Stefano

== See also ==
- Informant (disambiguation)
- The Informant (disambiguation)
