= UPSA =

UPSA may refer to:

- United Provinces of South America
- The University of the Philippines Singing Ambassadors
- Pontifical University of Salamanca, in Spain
- Union de pharmacologie scientifique appliquée, French pharmaceutical group 1935-1994
- University of California, San Diego Performance-Based Skills Assessment, cognitive test
