= Alexei Khvostenko =

Russian musician and poet (1940-2004)

Alexei Khvostenko (Russian: Алексей Хвостенко)
- Alexei Khvostenko at a concert in Moscow, in April 2004

Background information
- Also known as: Khvost (Russian: Хвост)
- Born: Alexei L'vovich Khvostenko; 14 November 1940
- Origin: Sverdlovsk (now Yekaterinburg), Soviet Union
- Died: 30 November 2004 (aged 64) Moscow, Russia
- Genres: Bard
- Occupations: Singer, poet, artist, singer-songwriter, songwriter
- Instruments: Vocals, guitar
- Years active: 1970–2004

Alexei Khvostenko (Russian: Алексей Львович Хвостенко; 14 November 1940 – 30 November 2004) was a Russian avant-garde poet, singer-songwriter, artist and sculptor. Khvostenko is also frequently referred to by the nickname Khvost (Russian: Хвост), meaning "tail".

== Biography ==
Alexei Khvostenko was born on 14 November 1940 in Sverdlovsk (now Yekaterinburg). He soon moved to Leningrad (now Saint Petersburg), where he grew up. He studied at the Leningrad State Institute of Theatre, Music and Cinematography. In 1963 he published through samizdat his first book, "Podozritel'" (translates, roughly, as "He, who suspects"). While in Leningrad, together with Anri Volokhonsky, Khvostenko founded an avant-garde literary group, "Verpa".

In 1968 Khvostenko moved to Moscow and became an active figure in Russian underground literary circles, publishing his poetry and songs through samizdat. Khvostenko became a prominent figure in the revival of the avant-garde movement in Soviet literature and art that became possible during Nikita Khrushchev's "thaw" after the death of Joseph Stalin. He is sometimes referred to as the "grandfather of Russian rock". Khvostenko co-wrote (with Volokhonsky) the song "The Golden City" ("Город золотой") that later achieved iconic status in Russia when it was sung by Boris Grebenshchikov in the 1987 film "Assa". Apart from literary works, Khvostenko was also an accomplished painter and sculptor (although his work was not officially exhibited), known for his innovative collages.

Although he did not consider himself to be a political dissident, Khvostenko was regularly harassed and persecuted by the Soviet authorities, accused of social parasitism (тунея́дство), and at one point was put into a psychiatric hospital (a tactic commonly employed by the Soviet authorities for punishing political dissidents). At the time Khvostenko was good friends with a prominent Russian poet Joseph Brodsky, who was also persecuted by the Soviet authorities.

In 1977 Khvostenko was forced by the Soviet authorities to emigrate. He ended up settling in Paris. There Khvostenko, together with Vladimir Maramzin, launched a literary journal, "Echo" (Russian: "Эхо"). Khvostenko became a leading figure in the Russian literary community in France. His Paris studio space—an art squat on the corner of 14 rue Juliette Dodu and rue Sambre et Meuse, in the 10th Arrondissement of Paris—became "a kind of club, where many famous groups and singers performed". While living in France, Khvostenko recorded a number of song albums, including several albums in the 1990s with the Russian rock group Auktyon (АукцЫон). His songs became widely popular in Russia, particularly after the dissolution of the Soviet Union.

In 2004, after a personal appeal to President Vladimir Putin, Khvostenko regained his Russian citizenship. Subsequently, he divided his time between Paris and Moscow. Alexei Khvostenko died of heart failure on 30 November 2004 in a Moscow hospital.

A year after his death Alexei Khvostenko's friends published his collected literary works in an anthology called "Verpa" – a word "invented by Khvostenko to describe his literary credo".
