= Honeymoon to Nowhere =

1965 novel by Akimitsu Takagi

Honeymoon to Nowhere (ゼロの蜜月, Zero no Mitsugetsu; Zero Honeymoon) is a 1965 novel by Akimitsu Takagi.

Sadako Mizuguchi translated the book into English. In 1977, it was published in English in the United States in a mass market paperback format, by Playboy Press. It was the second novel by Takagi to have an English translation. In 1999 it was published in English in the United States by Soho Press in a trade paperback format.

== Story ==
Yoshihiro Tsukamoto, who had just married Etsuko Ogata, vanishes during their honeymoon, and his body is discovered the following morning. Etsuko's family had wanted her to marry another person, Tetsuya Higuchi.

The detective on the case is Saburo Kirishima.

Katy Munger stated that the book demonstrates "how tradition and custom underpin Japan's tightly controlled society."

== Reception ==
Munger stated that this book had succeeded in the Japanese market.

== See also ==
Other novels by Takagi:

- The Informer
- The Noh Mask Murder
- The Tattoo Murder Case
