= SCoRS =

Schizophrenia clinical assessment tool

The Schizophrenia Cognition Rating Scale (SCoRS) is a 20 item interview-based clinical assessment that evaluates cognitive deficits and the degree to which these deficits impair patients’ day-to-day functioning. It was originally developed in 2001 at the Duke University Medical Center by Dr. Richard Keefe and is licensed through WCG Clinical. The SCoRS is used in clinical trials, academic research, and in clinical settings.

== Description ==
The SCoRS assessment collects information generated from three different sources:

1. An interview with the patient
2. An interview with an informant for the patient (ideally a person who has regular contact with the patient in everyday situations, such as a family member, friend, or social worker)
3. A rating based on the clinical judgment of the clinician who administered the scale to the patient and informant.

In addition to the 20 individual items, there is also a global rating assigned by the clinician after both interviews have been completed that draws upon information gained from the patient, informant, and the interviewer’s clinical judgment. Each interview averages 10–15 minutes in length with the patient interview preferably completed prior to the informant interview. Total assessment time for the SCoRS, including scoring, averages 20–30 minutes. The SCoRS requires no additional equipment beyond the paper administration form and is ideally administered in a quiet environment free from distractions. The informant interview can also be administered over the phone if the informant is unable to be physically present at the clinician’s office.

== Administration ==
The SCoRS is a 20 item interview-based clinical assessment containing questions about the patient’s ability to manage cognitively demanding, functionally relevant, everyday tasks such as conversations, watching television, and using electronic devices. The items were developed to assess the following cognitive domains:

- Attention
- Memory
- Working Memory
- Language Production
- Reasoning
- Problem Solving
- Motor Skills
- Social Cognition

These areas were chosen because they are often severely impaired in patients with schizophrenia and they are reliably associated with functional outcomes. Two examples of items from the SCoRS are, “Do you have difficulty with remembering names of people you know?” and “Do you have difficulty following a TV show?”. Each item is rated on a 4-point scale ranging from “No Impairment” to “Severe Impairment”. A rating of “Not Applicable” is also possible if a particular question does not apply to an individual patient. In addition to the 20 individual items, there is also a global rating assigned by the clinician after the patient and informant interviews have been completed. For the patient and informant interviews, the global rating reflects the overall impression of the patient’s level of cognitive difficulty across the 20 areas of cognition assessed and is rated on a scale of 1–10. Higher ratings indicate greater degrees of impairment.

== Use and supporting research ==
The SCoRS is currently being used as a co-primary endpoint in several international phase 2 and phase 3 trials assessing cognitive treatment change in schizophrenia and has been permitted by the FDA for pivotal registration trials. As an interview-based assessment of cognition, the SCoRS meets the criteria established by the FDA National Institute of Mental Health (NIMH) Measurement and Treatment Research to Improve Cognition in Schizophrenia (MATRICS) panel for co-primary outcome measures for cognitive enhancement trials in schizophrenia.

Criteria	Supporting Research
Strong Test-Retest Reliability	Keefe, Davis, et al, 2014 Green et al, 2008
Meaningful correlations with cognitive performance	Keefe, Davis, et al, 2014
Meaningful correlations with real-world functioning	Keefe, Davis, et al, 2014
Practical for experimenters	Green et al, 2008
Tolerable for patients	Green et al, 2008
Treatment Sensitivity	Harvey et al, 2011; Hilt et al, 2011; Keefe, Davis, et al, 2014; Keefe et al, 2015
Strong interrater reliability	Keefe et al, 2006;

In addition, the cognitive domains assessed by the SCoRS also correspond with the seven cognitive domains identified by experts from an initiative established by the NIMH MATRICS project which strengthens the SCoRS’ attractiveness as a co-primary measure for schizophrenia cognition trials. Data from recent research also suggest that the SCoRS has potential as a clinically relevant measure in a clinical practice setting due to its sensitivity to treatment effects.

== See also ==
- University of California, San Diego Performance-Based Skills Assessment
- VRFCAT-Virtual Reality Functional Capacity Assessment Tool
