= The Noh Mask Murder =

1949 novel by Akimitsu Takagi

The Noh Mask Murder (能面殺人事件, Nō men satsujin jiken; Noh mask murder incident) is a 1949 novel by Akimitsu Takagi. Jesse Kirkwood translated the English version, which was published by Pushkin Vertigo in 2024.

== Story ==
The work takes place in 1946. In the novel, Koichi Yanagi (柳 光一, Yanagi Kōichi) tries to figure out who had killed Taijiro Chizui (千鶴井 泰次郎, Chizui Taijirō), who dies in a locked room.

== Reception ==
Sarah Weinman of The New York Times wrote that the story setup was "wickedly plotted".

Declan Burke of Irish Times wrote that the story is "a playful, meta-narrative puzzle".

Steven W. Beattie of the Brampton Guardian wrote that the "stylistic pyrotechnics" are "the real draw" of the work even though the explanation for how the crimes occurred "is blatantly absurd".

== See also ==
Other novels by Takagi:

- Honeymoon to Nowhere
- The Informer
- The Tattoo Murder Case
