= University of California, San Diego Performance-Based Skills Assessment =

Measure of functional capacity for basic living skills

The University of California, San Diego Performance-Based Skills Assessment (UPSA) was created by Dr. Thomas L. Patterson to provide a more reliable measure of every day functioning in patients with schizophrenia than the previously utilized methods such as self-report, clinician ratings or direct observation.

== History ==
While everyday functioning has long been known to be affected in those with schizophrenia, the focus of testing and treatment had traditionally been on the symptoms of psychosis. As everyday functioning is fundamental for patients with cognitive impairment, the focal point has shifted towards accurate assessment of everyday functional capabilities.

Self-reporting or observations by a clinician have been the most common instruments used to assess everyday functioning, but these methods have weaknesses. For example, when using the self-report method, interference by the subject's psychopathy in the perception of their abilities can cause results to be distorted, and in the case of clinicians’ ratings, patients are typically only observed for a short duration, so clinicians may not be capable of comprehensively evaluating the patient's ability to perform daily tasks.

Dr. Thomas L. Patterson created the University of California, San Diego (UCSD) Performance-Based Skills Assessment (UPSA) to provide clinicians with a standardized set of tasks to assess a participant's real-world abilities. During an UPSA evaluation, participants perform every day activities under a clinician's direction. As a performance-based assessment, the UPSA has been found to be less vulnerable to error than self-report by the participant as it doesn't rely on the participant's level of awareness of their own abilities. The UPSA has been shown to be predictive of outcomes such as employment status, independence, and social skills, and shows a strong correlation with neuropsychological deficits.

== Description ==
The UPSA is a role-play test in which participants are asked to utilize props to demonstrate how well they perform everyday activities. Depending on the version, the UPSA is a paper-and-pen or electronic cognitive assessment that evaluates up to 6 domains of everyday functioning:

- Household Management
- Communication
- Financial Skills
- Transportation
- Comprehension/Planning
- Medication Management

== Administration ==
The Household Management, Communication, Transportation, Comprehension and Planning and Medication Management domains consist of one task each. The Financial Skills domain consists of two tasks. Depending on the version used, the assessment will encompass all or some of the following sub tests:

Domain	Task	Execution
Household Management	Create Shopping List	The participant is provided with a recipe and asked to create a shopping list. (S)he must exclude the already present items shown in a mock pantry and include needed ingredients.
Communication	Make Telephone Calls	The participant is given a disconnected push-button phone and asked to “do everything you would normally do when using a telephone.” (S)he is then asked to make phone calls, such as calling for help in an emergency or for directory assistance. Points are awarded for correct responses. For instance: the phone receiver was picked up first, the correct number was dialed, and the receiver was hung up appropriately.
Financial Skills	1.Count Change 2.Pay Bills	1.The participant is provided with "play money" in the form of bills and coins. (S)he is asked to count specific amounts and then to calculate the correct change for a transaction. 2.The participant is handed a utility bill and asked to write a check to pay this bill using the correct due date, amount, and description.
Transportation	Use Public Transit	Using a bus schedule, the participant will be asked which bus (s)he would take to ride from their origin to their intended destination. (S)he must identify the correct departure and arrival times, as well as the cost of a ticket.
Comprehension and Planning	Plan Recreational Activities	The participant is shown a scenario for participating in a recreational activity. (S)he is asked to plan how they will get to the activity, what to bring, and what to do once arrived at the destination.
Medication Management	Demonstrate ability to follow mock medication regimen	The participant is asked to manage a medication schedule, using four different medications to be taken throughout the day.

== Versions ==
=== UPSA-2 ===
A general version that allows for nationwide use in the United States. It uses all subscales, including Medication Management, and is intended for use in both small studies, and large multi-site clinical trials.

=== UPSA-B (Brief) ===
A shorter version of the UPSA-2 that uses only the financial skills and communication skills subscales (i.e. counting change, telephone calls, and paying bills). This version of the UPSA takes approximately 15 minutes to complete and has been shown to be an accurate predictor of patient ability to live independently, as compared to the full version of the UPSA. When used outside of the United States, the check-writing portion of the UPSA -B is replaced with a verbal response portion for populations with little to no familiarity with check writing.

=== UPSA-2-VIM (Validation of Intermediate Measures) ===
A full version of the UPSA-2, excluding the medication management task.

=== UPSA-2-ER (Extended Range) ===
A full version of the UPSA-2, containing additional questions to increase the level of difficulty for each subscale.

=== C-UPSA (Computerized) ===
A computer-based version of the UPSA that requires either a laptop or a desktop computer for test administration. It was created to meet the demand of a more portable and less material-heavy everyday functioning assessment. Validation studies found that the UPSA and C-UPSA scores were significantly correlated and that the C-UPSA provided increased benefits to the users, including a decreased administration time and minimization of examiner impact on performance.

=== UPSA-M (Mobile) ===
An iOS tablet-based mobile application version of the UPSA, successive of the C-UPSA. Advantages of the UPSA-M include standardized instructions, audio recording of the subject's responses, easier administration, and the option to administer the entire UPSA or the UPSA-B through the same program. Additionally, the tablet touch-screen design mimics real-life.

== Use ==
Various versions of the UPSA have been used in multiple phase 2 and 3 clinical trials, as well as academic studies in populations with schizophrenia, bipolar disorder, Alzheimer's disease, mild cognitive impairment (MCI), psychosis, and others. Translated and localized versions of the UPSA-2, UPSA-2-VIM, UPSA-2ER and UPSA-B are available for international use.

== Other cognitive assessment tools ==
- SCoRS (Schizophrenia Cognition Rating Scale)
- VRFCAT (Virtual Reality Functional Capacity Assessment Tool)
