= In Big Trouble =

1999 novel by Laura Lippman

- First edition
- Author: Laura Lippman
- Genre: Mystery fiction, Crime
- Published: 1999
- Publisher: Avon Books
- Pages: 309
- Awards: Anthony Award for Best Paperback Original (2000)
- ISBN: 978-0-752-83762-8

In Big Trouble is a book written by Laura Lippman and published by Avon Books in 1999, which later went on to win the Anthony Award for Best Paperback Original in 2000.
