= The Tattoo Murder Case =

1948 novel by Akimitsu Takagi

The Tattoo Murder Case (刺青殺人事件, Shisei satsujin jiken) is a 1948 novel by Akimitsu Takagi. It was published in English in 1998, translated by Deborah Boliver Boehm. The British edition uses the title The Tattoo Murder.

John Krewson of A.V. Club described it as the author's "most popular book", and according to him, as of 2002, "It remains one of the most widely read mysteries in Japan."

== Story ==
Kyosuke Kamizu, the central character, is a medical student who investigates murders. In this story, the victim is Kinue Nomura, the daughter of tattoo artist Horiyasu, found in a bathroom, which was locked.

== Reception ==
In 1948 the book won the award from the Mystery Writers Club.

Marilyn Stasio wrote an overall positive review, stating that the work had a "macabre allure" around the "sensational crime" even though the police operations depicted in the book were "clumsy" and the translated text was "overly formal" and had "wooden dialogue."

According to Krewson, Takagi is "Takagi is a powerful plotter and constructor of fascinating, complex characters." Therefore, because of that and the "unusual setting and premise," Krewson stated it "is a delightful, different book."

Kirkus Reviews concluded that the work is "Intricate, fantastic, and utterly absorbing." The review ends with the words "More, please."

Stephen Mansfield of The Japan Times wrote that the work reminds him of Tadahiko Hayashi's photography, and that "More than a mere novel, Takagi has left us a document of the times."

== See also ==
Other novels by Takagi:

- Honeymoon to Nowhere
- The Informer
- The Noh Mask Murder
