= Butchers Hill (novel) =

1998 novel by Laura Lippman

- First edition
- Author: Laura Lippman
- Genre: Mystery fiction
- Published: 1998
- Publisher: Avon Books
- Media type: Print (hardcover, mass-market paperback)
- Pages: 275
- Awards: Anthony Award for Best Paperback Original (1999)
- ISBN: 978-0-752-84362-9

Butchers Hill is a mystery novel written by American Laura Lippman, first published by Avon Books in July 1998, and by Orion in the United Kingdom. It later went on to win the Anthony Award for Best Paperback Original in 1999, as well as the Agatha Award for Best Novel in 1998.
