= Josiah Cross =

American actor

Josiah Cross (born c. 1997) is an American actor.

Born in Cleveland, Ohio, Cross attended Cleveland State University, and had initially planned to explore a career in sports journalism, but changed his major to theatre upon encouragement from his professors. He would go on to study at California State University, Northridge, and was awarded a scholarship to train at the Royal Academy of Dramatic Art by the Hollywood Foreign Press Association.

Cross had a voice role in the 2019 video game NBA 2K20. In February 2021, Cross had been cast in Sam Esmail's crime drama television pilot Acts of Crime, though the pilot would ultimately not be picked up. In July 2022, Cross was cast in two Apple TV+ miniseries: the war drama Masters of the Air, and the thriller Lady in the Lake.

== Filmography ==
=== Film ===
Year	Title	Role	Notes
2021	King Richard	TD	
2023	A Thousand and One	Terry (17 years old)	
2026	Is God Is	Ezekiel	

=== Television ===
Year	Title	Role	Notes
2024	Masters of the Air	2nd Lt. Richard D. Macon	Miniseries, 2 episodes
2024	Lady in the Lake	Reggie Robinson	Miniseries, 6 episodes

=== Video games ===
Year	Title	Role	Notes
2019	NBA 2K20	Porter Rose	Voice and motion capture
