= Lady of the Lake (disambiguation) =

The Lady of the Lake is the name of several related characters in the Arthurian legend.

Lady of the Lake can also refer to:

== Literature ==
- The Speeches at Prince Henry's Barriers or The Lady of the Lake, a masque or entertainment written by Ben Jonson
- The Lady of the Lake (poem), a poem by Sir Walter Scott
- The Lady of the Lake, a dramatic version of Scott's poem, by Edmund John Eyre
- Lady of the Lake (Sapkowski novel), a novel by Polish fantasy writer Andrzej Sapkowski
- "Lady of the lake", an epithet for Artemis Isoria by Pausanias

== Music ==
- Fräulein vom See, by Franz Schubert, a Lieder cycle which contains Schubert's Ave Maria
- La donna del lago, an opera by Gioachino Rossini, based on Scott's poem
- "Lady of the Lake", a song by Carole King and Toni Stern on the 1968 Strawberry Alarm Clock album The World in a Sea Shell
- "Lady of the Lake", a song by Jade Warrior from the album Last Autumn's Dream
- "Lady of the Lake", a song by Rainbow from the album Long Live Rock 'n' Roll
- Lady of the Lake, an opera by Elie Siegmeister
- "Lady of the Lake", a song by Starcastle from the album Starcastle
- "Lady of the Lake", a song by Rick Wakeman from the album The Myths and Legends of King Arthur and the Knights of the Round Table

== Film and TV ==
- The Lady of the Lake (film), a 1928 British film
- "The Lady of the Lake" (Merlin), an episode of the BBC TV series Merlin
- "Lady of the Lake" (Jewel Riders), an episode of the animated television series Princess Gwenevere and the Jewel Riders
- Lady of the Lake, a 1998 film directed by Maurice Devereaux
- "Lady of the Lake" (Once Upon a Time), a 2012 ABC fairy tale drama Once Upon a Time episode

== Transport ==
=== Locomotives ===
- LNWR Lady of the Lake Class, a British type of express passenger steam locomotive, of which 60 were built by the London and North Western Railway between 1859 and 1865

=== Ships ===
- Lady of the Lake, the first steamboat ferry in Scotland plying across the Firth of Forth from Leith to Alloa from 1812
- Lady of the Lake, a steamboat built on Anderson Lake, British Columbia, Canada in 1860
- Lady of the Lake, a ferry on Lake Chelan to the community of Stehekin, Washington
- Lady of the Lake (brig), an Aberdeen-built brig which sank in 1833
- Lady of the Lake (steamboat, 1836), a paddle steamboat built in 1836 for use on the Strangford Ferry in Northern Ireland
- Lady of the Lake (steamboat, 1897), a screw steamboat built in 1897 at Seattle, Washington, later rebuilt and renamed Ruth
- MY Lady of the Lake, an excursion vessel built in 1877 and still operating on Ullswater in the English Lake District
- SY Lady of the Lake (1845), a vessel built in 1845 for service on Lake Windermere in the English Lake District; see Windermere Lake Cruises
- SY Lady of the Lake (1859), a vessel built in 1859 for service on Coniston Water in the English Lake District; Furness Railway
- SY Lady of the Lake (1908), a vessel built in 1908 to replace the 1859 vessel on Coniston Water in the English Lake District; Furness Railway
- USS Lady of the Lake, a United States Navy schooner that participated in the War of 1812

== Other ==
- Hallie Latham Illingworth, dubbed Lady of the Lake, a murder victim whose saponified corpse was discovered floating on Lake Crescent in 1940

== See also ==
- Lady in the Lake (disambiguation)
- Lady in the Water, a 2006 film by M. Night Shyamalan
