= Takagi Kyozo =

Japanese poet

Takagi Kyozo (Japanese: 高木恭造; October 12, 1903 – October 23, 1987) was a Japanese poet who wrote in the Tsugaru dialect and an ophthalmologist.

His nephew is crime fiction writer Akimitsu Takagi.

He was born in Aomori, Aomori Prefecture, Japan. He worked briefly as a substitute teacher and later news reporter. He eventually became an ophthalmologist and opened his own clinic in Hirosaki.

October 23 is celebrated in Japan as "Tsugaru dialect day" (Japanese: 津軽弁の日) in honor of the anniversary of his death. There is also a monument dedicated to him with an except from a Marmelo poem in Hirosaki.

== Biography ==
- Marmelo (1931)
- My Requiem (1935)
- The Descendant of Crows (1939)
- Fengtien Castle and its Neighborhood (1940)
- Homecoming (1969), a play
