= The Informant =

The Informant may refer to:

- The Informant (1997 film), a TV movie about Northern Ireland
- The Informant (2013 film), a 2013 French film
- The Informant (book), a 2000 book by Kurt Eichenwald
- The Informant!, a 2009 film based on the book
- The Informant (TV series), 2022 Hungarian-language TV series

== See also ==
- Informant (disambiguation)
- The Informer (disambiguation)
