= The Informer (Takagi novel) =

1965 novel by Akimitsu Takagi

The Informer (密告者, Mikkoku-sha) is a 1965 novel by Akimitsu Takagi. It was translated into English by Sadako Mizuguchi. Soho Crime published the English version, which was released in 1999. It was the third book by Takagi to be published in English.

Author Katy Munger wrote that the book "became a runaway bestseller and established Takagi as one of Japan's most popular writers."

== Plot ==
Saburo Kirishima investigates murder cases in a series of books. In this book, Shigeo Segawa, who had accepted a job involving spying on companies, is the primary suspect in the murder of Shoichi Ogino, a former classmate of his.

The story is derived from a real-life event.

Chris Gay of The Wall Street Journal describes Segawa as "hapless".

== Writing style ==
Munger described the writing style as "simple, linear and bare", and this is "particularly in translation".

== Reception ==
Gay stated that it "was a bestseller when originally published in Japan."

Stephen Mansfield wrote that the novel reflected the cultural shift of the 1960s by "allowing his characters to fully engage in the newfound sexual freedoms."

Kirkus Reviews stated that the pre-murder portions have a "brilliantly brutal effect of a more polite David Mamet" while, in regards to the portion after the murder, the details of the crime said to occur hold more interest than the investigation process.

Publishers Weekly stated that the resolution to the story is "elegant".

== See also ==
Other novels by Takagi:

- Honeymoon to Nowhere
- The Noh Mask Murder
- The Tattoo Murder Case
