= What the Dead Know =

Crime thriller novel by Laura Lippman

- First edition
- Author: Laura Lippman
- Language: English
- Genre: Crime novel
- Publisher: William Morrow
- Publication date: March 13, 2007
- Publication place: United States
- Media type: Print (Hardcover)
- Pages: 384 pages
- ISBN: 0-06-112885-6

What the Dead Know is a crime thriller by the American writer Laura Lippman, published in 2007. Set in Baltimore in 2005, the novel follows an investigation into a woman who claims to be Heather Bethany, a girl who disappeared thirty years prior. The book received critical acclaim and won the 2007 Quill Award in the mystery/suspense/thriller category, as well as the 2008 Anthony Award for Best Novel.

== Main characters, as first introduced ==
- The Bethany family: Dave and Miriam (née Toles); daughters Heather and Sunny
- Penelope Jackson – registered owner of a car in a highway accident
- Detective Kevin Infante – lead investigator
- Harold Lenhardt – Infante's sergeant
- Gloria Bustamante – lawyer
- Nancy Porter – police researcher and Infante's former police partner
- Kay Sullivan – social worker at St. Agnes Hospital; children Seth and Grace
- Dr. Schumeier – psychiatrist at St. Agnes Hospital
- Chester "Chet" V. Willoughby IV – retired detective
- Stan Dunham – former Pennsylvania property owner
- Irene – a foster mother
- Tony Dunham – man killed in a Florida house fire
- Roy Pincharelli – music teacher
- Joe – art gallery owner
- Javier – art gallery employee
- Jeff and Thelma Baumgarten – couple in fidelity crisis
- Ruth Leibig – Ohio school girl
- Estelle and Herb Turner – practitioners of Fivefold Path spirituality
- Priscilla "Syl" Browne – employee at "Swiss Colony" restaurant

== Critical reception ==
Reviewers saw What the Dead Know as a success both as a well-crafted mystery and as an emotionally powerful novel.

The Guardian described the novel as a "realistic and poignant detailing of emotional hide-and-seek, ... an excellent mystery and a thoughtful exploration of the nature and effects of grief and loss." Kirkus Reviews praised the novel, noting that "Lippman (To the Power of Three, 2005, etc.) crafts a tale that resonates long after the last page is turned." Janet Maslin of The New York Times praised What the Dead Know as "an uncommonly clever imposter story", "three-dimensional", and worthy of reading a second time — "You read it once just to move breathlessly toward the finale. Then you revisit it to marvel at how well Ms. Lippman pulled the wool over your eyes."
