= Tsugaru dialect =

Japanese dialect spoken in Western Aomori Prefecture

- Aomori dialect
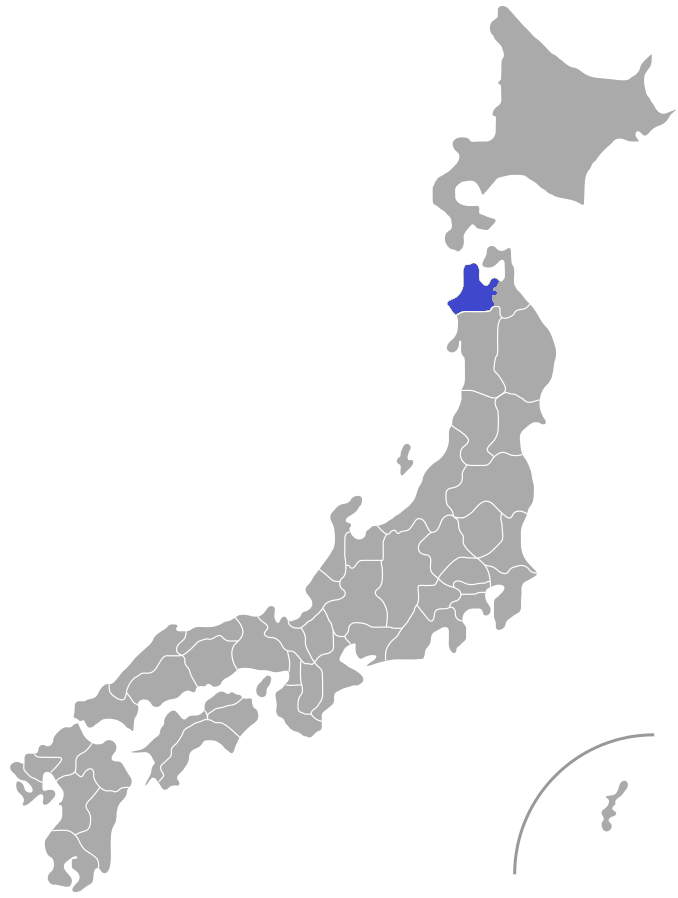
- Tsugaru dialect area.
- Native to: Japan
- Region: Aomori
- Language family: Japonic: Japanese; Eastern Japanese; Tōhoku; Northern; Tsugaru dialect

Language codes
- ISO 639-3: –
- Glottolog: tsug1237
- IETF: ja-u-sd-jp02

The Tsugaru dialect (津軽弁, Tsugaru-ben) is a Japanese dialect spoken in western Aomori Prefecture.

The Tsugaru dialect is reputed to be so divergent from standard Japanese for those who are not native speakers, that even people living in the same prefecture may have trouble understanding it. (Note: The ResearchGate mirror (archive) contains metadata about the presentation.) In 1988, fans of the Tsugaru dialect proclaimed October 23 to be Tsugaru Dialect Day (津軽弁の日, Tsugaru-ben no hi). October 23 is the anniversary of the death of Takagi Kyozo, a famous poet who wrote in the Tsugaru dialect.

In Tsuruta, there is an annual summer Tsugaru-ben competition (津軽弁大会, Tsugaru-ben taikai) in which teams of foreigners create short skits or performances, usually humorous, using the dialect. In June 2009, a short segment featuring the competition was broadcast nationally on NHK.

== Examples ==
The words are sometimes very different from those of standard Japanese.

English	Standard Japanese	Tsugaru dialect
I	私 (わたし, watashi)	わ (wa)
you	あなた (anata)	な (na)
cute	かわいい (kawaii)	めごい (megoi)
friend	友達 (ともだち, tomodachi)	けやぐ (keyagu)
countryside	田舎 (いなか, inaka)	じゃご (jyago)
but	けれど (keredo)	だばって (dabatte)
same	同じ (おなじ, onaji)	ふとず (futozu)
very	とても (totemo)	たげ／がっぱ (tage/gappa)
cold	冷たい (つめたい, tsumetai)	しゃっこい (shakkoi)
warm	暖かい (あたたかい, atatakai)	ぬげ (nuge)
noisy	うるさい (urusai)	さしね (sashine)
irritating	イライラする (ira-irasuru)	かちゃくちゃね (kacha-kuchane)
money	（お）金 (（お）かね, (o-)kane)	じぇんこ (jenko)
forehead	ひたい (hitai), （お）でこ ((o-)deko)	なずぎ (nazugi)
home	家 (いえ, ie)	え (e)
cooked rice/meal	ごはん (gohan)	まま (mama)
to freeze (transitive verb)	凍らせる (こおらせる, kooraseru)	しみらがす (shimiragasu)
to freeze (intransitive verb)	凍る (こおる, kooru)	しみる (shimiru)
to eat (verb)	食べる (たべる, taberu), 食う (くう, kuu) (colloquial)	く (ku)
