= Sparkle Hayter =

Canadian journalist and author (born 1958)

- Born: 1958 (age 67–68); Pouce Coupe, British Columbia
- Education: New York University
- Occupations: Journalist, Author
- Writing career
- Genres: Crime Fiction, Tart Noir
- Notable works: What's A Girl Gotta Do? (1994); The Chelsea Girl Murders (2000); Bandit Queen Boogie (2004)
- Notable awards: Arthur Ellis Award
- Website: www.sparklehayter.com

Sparkle Hayter (born 1958) is a Canadian journalist and author. In 1995, she received the Arthur Ellis Award (Best First Crime Novel) of the Crime Writers of Canada for her novel What's A Girl Gotta Do? (1995). In 1998, she became the first winner of the UK's Sherlock award for "Best Comic Detective." Hayter has also performed as a stand-up comedian.

== Early life and education ==
Hayter was born in Pouce Coupe, British Columbia and grew up in Edmonton, Alberta. Her father was Ron Hayter, the longest-serving city councillor of Edmonton, Alberta. In 1982, she graduated in film and television production from New York University.

== Career ==
Among other things, she worked for CNN in Atlanta, New York, and Washington, for WABC in New York City and CIII-TV in Toronto. At the time of the Afghan civil war, she moved to Pakistan and then went along with the Mujahedin to Afghanistan, reporting for the Toronto Star. After this, she decided to give up journalism as a career. After her return to the U.S. she married and began a career as a comic and a writer. She moved briefly to Tokyo, then on her return to New York divorced and went to live in the famous Chelsea Hotel.

In 1993, she published her first novel, What's a Girl Gotta Do?, the first in the Robin Hudson series, which proved her breakthrough. In a starred review, Publishers Weekly called it "flat-out funny, audacious, and a little bit weird, Hayter stakes out territory all her own." She wrote pieces for the New York Times Op-Ed Page, The Nation and The Globe and Mail, was a regular participant on CNN's talk show "CNN & Company" and 'also appeared on Good Day New York, NPR, CBC, BBC and Paris Premiere. In late 2001, she moved to Paris, where she joined the Kilometer Zero arts cooperative and lived in the In Fact art squat. In 2007–2008, she began working in Bollywood, where she bought Indian films for a Canadian movie network and produced video promos and interviews to support the programming for "Bollywood Saturday Night."

In 1995, she received the Arthur Ellis Award (Best First Crime Novel) of the Crime Writers of Canada for her novel What's A Girl Gotta Do?. In 1998, she became the first winner of the UK's Sherlock Award for "Best Comic Detective." She went on publish two more novels and numerous stories and essays.

Hayter has also performed as a stand-up.

== Works ==
=== Robin Hudson series ===
- 1994: What's A Girl Gotta Do?
- 1996: Nice Girls Finish Last
- 1997: Revenge of the Cootie Girls
- 1998: The Last Manly Man
- 2000: The Chelsea Girl Murders
- 2005: Last Girl Standing

=== Other novels ===
- 2002: Naked Brunch
- 2004: Bandit Queen Boogie

== See also ==
- Tart Noir
- Katy Munger
