= Akimitsu Takagi =

Japanese writer (1920–1995)

- Takagi
- Born: 25 September 1920; Aomori, Japan
- Died: 9 September 1995 (aged 74); Tokyo, Japan
- Occupation: Writer
- Relatives: Takagi Kyozo (uncle)
- Writing career
- Genres: Crime fiction, science fiction

Akimitsu Takagi (高木 彬光, Takagi Akimitsu; 25 September 1920 – 9 September 1995) was the pen-name of a popular Japanese crime fiction writer active during the Shōwa period of Japan. His real name was Seiichi Takagi (高木 誠一, Takagi Seiichi).

== Biography ==
Takagi was born in Aomori City in Aomori Prefecture in northern Japan. He graduated from the Daiichi High School (which was often abbreviated to Ichi-ko) and Kyoto Imperial University, where he studied metallurgy. He was employed by the Nakajima Aircraft Company, but lost his job with the prohibition on military industries in Japan after World War II.

On the recommendation of a fortune-teller, he decided to become a writer. He sent the second draft of his first detective story, The Tattoo Murder Case, to the great mystery writer Edogawa Ranpo, who recognized his skill and who recommended it to a publisher. It was published in 1948.

He received the Tantei sakka club sho (Mystery Writers Club Award) for his second novel, The Noh Mask Murder in 1950.

Takagi was a self-taught legal expert and the heroes in most of his books were usually prosecutors or police detectives, although the protagonist in his first stories was Kyosuke Kamizu, an assistant professor at Tokyo University.

Takagi explored variations on the detective novel in the 1960s, including historical mysteries, picaresque novels, legal mysteries, economic crime stories, and science fiction alternate history.

In The Informer (1965), a former Tokyo stock exchange worker is fired because of illegal trades. A subsequent stock market crash means that he has no hope of returning to his old career and therefore he accepts a job from an old friend even though he eventually discovers that the new firm he works for is really an agency for industrial espionage. The plot is based on actual events.

Behind the writer, there is also the photographer passionate about traditional Japanese tattooing. Takagi came into contact with the Tokyo tattoo scene while writing his first novel (Shisei Satsujin Jiken, 1948) and began to document it. In the 1950s, he photographed the greatest tattoo artists of the time, their clients and their tattoos, thus creating an archive that is as unseen as it is rare. Discovered in 2017 by French journalist Pascal Bagot [archive], a specialist in tattooing in Japan, these images - of an unexpected quality for a non-professional - were collected in a book entitled The Tattoo Writer [archive] and published in 2022. They establish him as one of the most important witnesses to the history of tattooing in 20th century Japan.

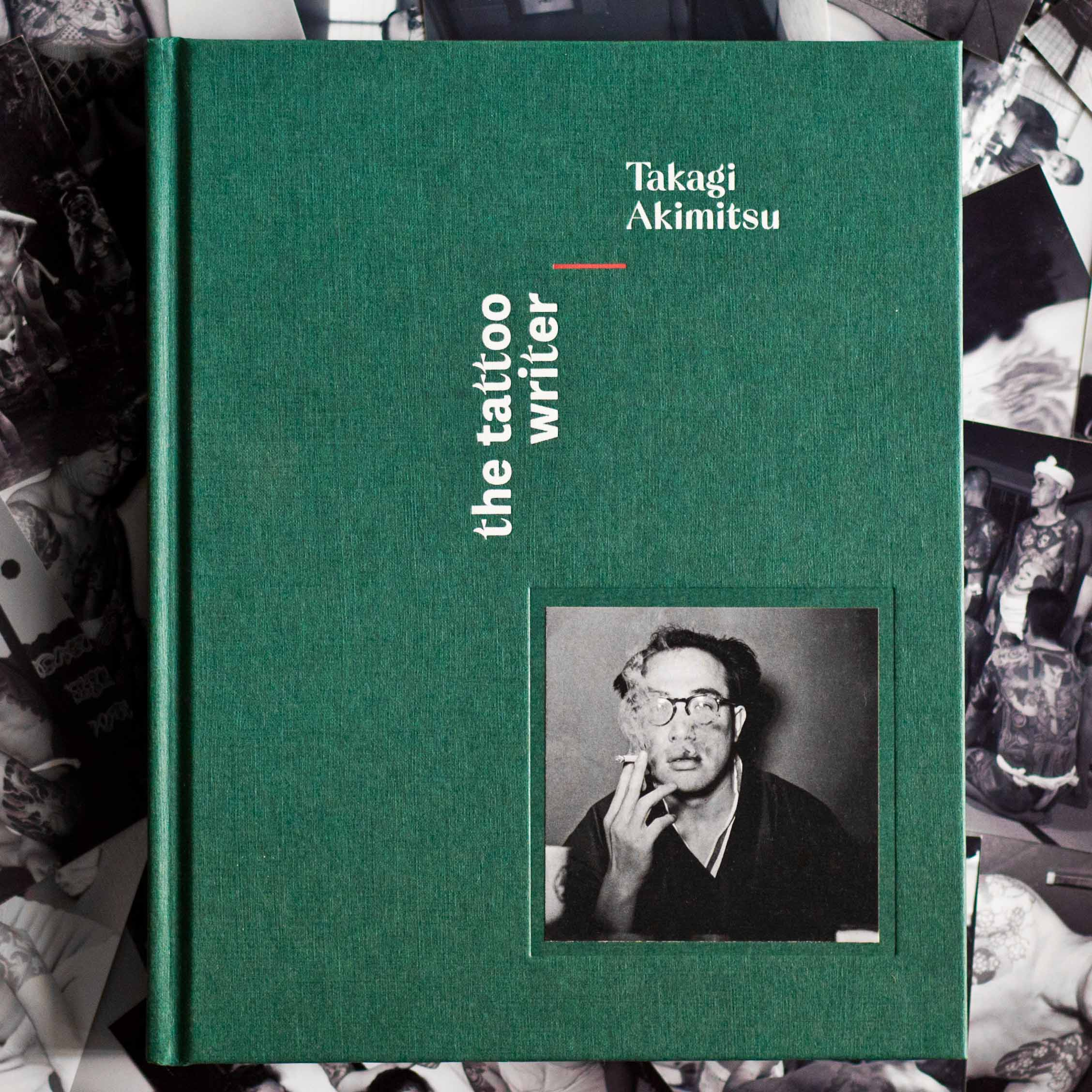
Book of photographs of the Tokyo tattoo scene in the 1950s taken by Akimitsu Takagi. 2022

He was struck by stroke several times since 1979, and died in 1995.

== Works in English translation ==
- The Noh Mask Murder. Pushkin Vertigo (2024). ISBN 978-1782279655. (original title: Nōmen Satsujin Jiken)

Detective Kyosuke Kamizu series

- The Tattoo Murder Case. Soho Crime (1999). ISBN 1-56947-156-8. (original title: Shisei Satsujin Jiken)

Prosecutor Saburo Kirishima series

- Honeymoon to Nowhere. Soho Crime (1999). ISBN 1-56947-154-1. (original title: Zero no Mitsugetsu) (aka No Patent on Murder)
- The Informer. Soho Crime (2001). ISBN 1-56947-243-2. (original title: Mikkokusha)

== Main works ==
=== Detective Kyosuke Kamizu series ===
- Novels
  - The Tattoo Murder Case (1948) (刺青殺人事件)
  - House of Spell (1949) (呪縛の家)
  - Madan no Shashu (1950) (魔弾の射手)
  - Hakuyoki (1952) (白妖鬼)
  - Akuma no Chosho (1955) (悪魔の嘲笑)
  - Why Was the Doll Killed? (1955) (人形はなぜ殺される)
  - Shi o Hiraku Tobira (1957) (死を開く扉)
  - Mystery of Genghis Khan (1958) (成吉思汗の秘密)
  - Hakuma no Uta (1958) (白魔の歌)
  - Kasha to Shisha (1959) (火車と死者)
  - Shinigami no Za (1960) (死神の座)
  - Mystery of Yamataikoku (1973) (邪馬台国の秘密)
  - Kitsune no Misshitsu (1977) (狐の密室)
  - Mystery of the early Japanese Emperors (1986) (古代天皇の秘密)
  - Seven Lucky Gods Murder Case (1987) (七福神殺人事件)
  - Kamizu Kyosuke e no Chosen (1991) (神津恭介への挑戦)
  - Kamizu Kyosuke no Fukkatsu (1993) (神津恭介の復活)
  - Kamizu Kyosuke no Yogen (1994) (神津恭介の予言)
- Short story collections
  - Crime in my Ichi-Ko days (1976) (わが一高時代の犯罪)
  - Shibijin Gekijo (1977) (死美人劇場)
  - Kage Naki Onna (1977) (影なき女)
  - Jakyo no Kami (1978) (邪教の神)
  - Enchantress's Lodge (1982) (妖婦の宿)
  - Shirayuki Hime (1986) (白雪姫)
  - Kubi o Kau Onna (1988) (首を買う女)

=== Prosecutor Saburo Kirishima series ===
- Novels
  - Prosecutor Saburo Kirishima (1964) (検事 霧島三郎)
  - The Informer (1965) (密告者)
  - Honeymoon to Nowhere (1965) (ゼロの蜜月)
  - Tokai no Okami (1966) (都会の狼)
  - Hono no Onna (1967) (炎の女)
  - Hai no Onna (1970) (灰の女)
  - Maboroshi no Akuma (1974) (幻の悪魔)
- Short story collections
  - Nimakuhan no Satsujin (1976) (二幕半の殺人)
  - Hana no Kake (1977) (花の賭)

=== Other novels ===
- The Noh Mask Murder (1949) (能面殺人事件)
- People Gathering like Ants (1959) (人蟻)
- Blind Spot in Broad Daylight (1960) (白昼の死角)
- Destructive Justice (1961) (破戒裁判)
- Combined Fleet Has Won at Last (1971) (連合艦隊ついに勝つ)
- Goodbye Mask (1988) (仮面よ、さらば)
