= Informant function =

Gradient of the likelihood function

In statistics, the informant or score is the gradient of the log-likelihood function with respect to the parameter vector. Evaluated at a particular value of the parameter vector, the score indicates the steepness of the log-likelihood function and thereby the sensitivity to infinitesimal changes to the parameter values. If the log-likelihood function is continuous over the parameter space, the score will vanish at a local maximum or minimum; this fact is used in maximum likelihood estimation to find the parameter values that maximize the likelihood function.

Since the score is a function of the observations, which are subject to sampling error, it lends itself to a test statistic known as score test in which the parameter is held at a particular value. Further, the ratio of two likelihood functions evaluated at two distinct parameter values can be understood as a definite integral of the score function.

== Definition ==
The score is the gradient (the vector of partial derivatives) of $\log \mathcal{L}(\theta;x)$, the natural logarithm of the likelihood function, with respect to an m-dimensional parameter vector $\theta$.

$$s(\theta;x) \equiv \frac{\partial \log \mathcal{L}(\theta;x)}{\partial \theta}$$

This differentiation yields a $(1 \times m)$ row vector at each value of $\theta$ and $x$, and indicates the sensitivity of the likelihood (its derivative normalized by its value).

In older literature, "linear score" may refer to the score with respect to infinitesimal translation of a given density. This convention arises from a time when the primary parameter of interest was the mean or median of a distribution. In this case, the likelihood of an observation is given by a density of the form $\mathcal L(\theta;X)=f(X+\theta)$. The "linear score" is then defined as

$$s_{\rm linear}
= \frac{\partial}{\partial X} \log f(X)$$

== Properties ==
=== Mean ===
While the score is a function of $\theta$, it also depends on the observations $\mathbf{x} = (x_1, x_2, \ldots, x_T)$ at which the likelihood function is evaluated, and in view of the random character of sampling one may take its expected value over the sample space. Under certain regularity conditions on the density functions of the random variables, the expected value of the score, evaluated at any parameter value $\theta$, is zero. To see this, rewrite the likelihood function $\mathcal L$ as a probability density function $\mathcal L(\theta; x) = f(x; \theta)$, and denote the sample space $\mathcal{X}$. Then:

$$\begin{align}
\operatorname{E}(s\mid\theta)
& =\int_{\mathcal{X}}
f(x; \theta) \frac{\partial}{\partial\theta} \log \mathcal L(\theta;x)
\,dx \\[6pt]
& = \int_{\mathcal{X}}
f(x; \theta) \frac{1}{f(x; \theta)}\frac{\partial f(x; \theta)}{\partial \theta}\, dx
=\int_{\mathcal{X}} \frac{\partial f(x; \theta)}{\partial \theta} \, dx
\end{align}$$

The assumed regularity conditions allow the interchange of derivative and integral (see Leibniz integral rule), hence the above expression may be rewritten as

$$\frac{\partial}{\partial\theta} \int_{\mathcal{X}}
f(x; \theta) \, dx
=
\frac{\partial}{\partial\theta}1 = 0.$$

Note that the value of the score, evaluated at the true parameter value $\theta^\ast$, is zero.

It is worth restating the above result in words: the expected value of the score, at any parameter value $\theta$ is zero. Thus, if one were to repeatedly sample from some distribution, and repeatedly calculate the score, then the mean value of the scores would tend to zero asymptotically.

=== Variance ===
The variance of the score, $\operatorname{Var}(s(\theta)) = \operatorname{E}(s(\theta) s(\theta)^{\mathsf{T}})$, can be derived from the above expression for the expected value.

$$\begin{align}
0
& =\frac{\partial}{\partial \theta^{\mathsf{T}}} \operatorname{E}(s\mid\theta) \\[6pt]
& =\frac{\partial}{\partial \theta^{\mathsf{T}}} \int_{\mathcal{X}}
\frac{\partial \log \mathcal L(\theta;X)}{\partial\theta}  f(x; \theta)
\,dx \\[6pt]
& = \int_{\mathcal{X}}
\frac{\partial}{\partial \theta^{\mathsf{T}}} \left\{ \frac{\partial \log \mathcal L(\theta;X)}{\partial\theta}  f(x; \theta) \right\}
\,dx \\[6pt]
& = \int_{\mathcal{X}} \left\{ \frac{\partial^2 \log \mathcal{L}(\theta;X)}{\partial \theta \, \partial \theta^\mathsf{T}} f(x; \theta) + \frac{\partial \log \mathcal{L}(\theta;X)}{\partial \theta} \frac{\partial f(x; \theta)}{\partial \theta^\mathsf{T} } \right\} \,dx \\[6pt]
& = \int_{\mathcal{X}} \frac{\partial^2 \log \mathcal{L}(\theta;X)}{\partial \theta \partial \theta^\mathsf{T}} f(x; \theta) \,dx + \int_{\mathcal{X}} \frac{\partial \log \mathcal{L}(\theta;X)}{\partial \theta} \frac{\partial f(x; \theta)}{\partial \theta^\mathsf{T} } \,dx \\[6pt]
& = \int_{\mathcal{X}} \frac{\partial^2 \log \mathcal{L}(\theta;X)}{\partial \theta \, \partial \theta^\mathsf{T}} f(x; \theta) \,dx + \int_{\mathcal{X}} \frac{\partial \log \mathcal{L}(\theta;X)}{\partial \theta} \frac{\partial \log \mathcal{L}(\theta;X)}{\partial \theta^\mathsf{T} } f(x; \theta) \,dx \\[6pt]
& = \operatorname{E}\left( \frac{\partial^2 \log \mathcal{L}(\theta;X)}{\partial \theta \, \partial \theta^\mathsf{T}} \right) + \operatorname{E}\left( \frac{\partial \log \mathcal{L}(\theta;X)}{\partial \theta} \left[ \frac{\partial \log \mathcal{L}(\theta;X)}{\partial \theta} \right]^\mathsf{T} \right)
\end{align}$$

Hence the variance of the score is equal to the negative expected value of the Hessian matrix of the log-likelihood.

$$\operatorname{E}(s(\theta) s(\theta)^{\mathsf{T}}) = - \operatorname{E}\left( \frac{\partial^2 \log \mathcal{L}}{\partial \theta \, \partial \theta^{\mathsf{T}} } \right)$$

The latter is known as the Fisher information and is written $\mathcal{I}(\theta)$. Note that the Fisher information is not a function of any particular observation, as the random variable $X$ has been averaged out. This concept of information is useful when comparing two methods of observation of some random process.

== Examples ==
=== Bernoulli process ===
Consider observing the first n trials of a Bernoulli process, and seeing that A of them are successes and the remaining B are failures, where the probability of success is θ.

Then the likelihood $\mathcal L$ is

$$\mathcal L(\theta;A,B)=\frac{(A+B)!}{A!B!}\theta^A(1-\theta)^B,$$

so the score s is

$$s=\frac{\partial \log \mathcal L}{\partial \theta}=\frac{1}{\mathcal L}\frac{\partial \mathcal L}{\partial\theta} = \frac{A}{\theta}-\frac{B}{1-\theta}.$$

We can now verify that the expectation of the score is zero. Noting that the expectation of A is nθ and the expectation of B is n(1 − θ) [recall that A and B are random variables], we can see that the expectation of s is

$$E(s)
= \frac{n\theta}{\theta} - \frac{n(1-\theta)}{1-\theta}
= n - n
= 0.$$

We can also check the variance of $s$. We know that A + B = n (so B = n − A) and the variance of A is nθ(1 − θ) so the variance of s is

$$\begin{align}
\operatorname{var}(s) & =\operatorname{var}\left(\frac{A}{\theta}-\frac{n-A}{1-\theta}\right)
=\operatorname{var}\left(A\left(\frac{1}{\theta}+\frac{1}{1-\theta}\right)\right) \\
& =\left(\frac{1}{\theta}+\frac{1}{1-\theta}\right)^2\operatorname{var}(A)
=\frac{n}{\theta(1-\theta)}.
\end{align}$$

=== Binary outcome model ===
For models with binary outcomes (Y = 1 or 0), the model can be scored with the logarithm of predictions

$$S = Y \log( p ) + ( 1 - Y ) ( \log( 1 - p ) )$$

where p is the probability in the model to be estimated and S is the score.

== Applications ==
=== Scoring algorithm ===
The scoring algorithm is an iterative method for numerically determining the maximum likelihood estimator.

=== Score test ===
Note that $s$ is a function of $\theta$ and the observation $\mathbf{x} = (x_1, x_2, \ldots, x_T)$, so that, in general, it is not a statistic. However, in certain applications, such as the score test, the score is evaluated at a specific value of $\theta$ (such as a null-hypothesis value), in which case the result is a statistic. Intuitively, if the restricted estimator is near the maximum of the likelihood function, the score should not differ from zero by more than sampling error. In 1948, C. R. Rao first proved that the square of the score divided by the information matrix follows an asymptotic χ^{2}-distribution under the null hypothesis.

Further note that the likelihood-ratio test is given by

$$-2 \left[ \log \mathcal{L}(\theta_0) - \log \mathcal{L}(\hat{\theta}) \right] = 2 \int_{\theta_0}^{\hat{\theta}} \frac{ d \, \log \mathcal{L}(\theta) }{d \theta} \, d \theta = 2 \int_{\theta_0}^{\hat{\theta}} s(\theta) \, d \theta$$

which means that the likelihood-ratio test can be understood as the area under the score function between $\theta_{0}$ and $\hat{\theta}$.

== History ==
The term "score function" may initially seem unrelated to its contemporary meaning, which centers around the derivative of the log-likelihood function in statistical models. This apparent discrepancy can be traced back to the term's historical origins. The concept of the "score function" was first introduced by British statistician Ronald Fisher in his 1935 paper titled "The Detection of Linkage with 'Dominant' Abnormalities." Fisher employed the term in the context of genetic analysis, specifically for families where a parent had a dominant genetic abnormality. Over time, the application and meaning of the "score function" have evolved, diverging from its original context but retaining its foundational principles.

Fisher's initial use of the term was in the context of analyzing genetic attributes in families with a parent possessing a genetic abnormality. He categorized the children of such parents into four classes based on two binary traits: whether they had inherited the abnormality or not, and their zygosity status as either homozygous or heterozygous. Fisher devised a method to assign each family a "score," calculated based on the number of children falling into each of the four categories. This score was used to estimate what he referred to as the "linkage parameter," which described the probability of the genetic abnormality being inherited. Fisher evaluated the efficacy of his scoring rule by comparing it with an alternative rule and against what he termed the "ideal score." The ideal score was defined as the derivative of the logarithm of the sampling density, as mentioned on page 193 of his work.

The term "score" later evolved through subsequent research, notably expanding beyond the specific application in genetics that Fisher had initially addressed. Various authors adapted Fisher's original methodology to more generalized statistical contexts. In these broader applications, the term "score" or "efficient score" started to refer more commonly to the derivative of the log-likelihood function of the statistical model in question. This conceptual expansion was significantly influenced by a 1948 paper by C. R. Rao, which introduced "efficient score tests" that employed the derivative of the log-likelihood function.

Thus, what began as a specialized term in the realm of genetic statistics has evolved to become a fundamental concept in broader statistical theory, often associated with the derivative of the log-likelihood function.

== See also ==
- Fisher information – Notion in statistics
- Information theory – Scientific study of digital information
- Score test – Statistical test based on the gradient of the likelihood function
- Scoring algorithm – Form of Newton's method used in statistics
- Standard score – How many standard deviations apart from the mean an observed datum is
- Support curve – Function related to statistics and probability theory
