= Art squat =

Building commandeered by artists

An art squat is a name used to describe the action of artists to occupy (or squat in) an abandoned building, thereby creating studio space to create art. Art squats often have a semi-legal or illegal status.

Tacheles, in Berlin, Germany, was one of many buildings occupied by artists in the years after World War II and continued to operate as a studio space and gallery until 2012, when the authorities closed it for redevelopment.

Paris, France, has experienced several decades of art squats, a result of high rents and a large Bohemian artist population. Early examples include the Bateau-Lavoir (destroyed during the 1970s) and Hôpital Éphémère, occupied during the 1980s and 90s. In the 2000s the Paris city hall began an initiative to redevelop and legalise the city's art squats, beginning with a 6-storey squat at 59 rue de Rivoli which was renovated and reopened in 2009.

Art Squat was also the name of an Artists Collective co-founded by Johnny Otto in Los Angeles in the early 1990s, which took over abandoned properties in the Fairfax District and converted them into Galleries.

In 2021 Art Squat Magazine was founded as an online source for interviews and articles about Artists from all over the world, including Dave_Navarro, Plastic_Jesus_(artist), Billy_Morrison, WRDSMTH, Blek_le_Rat, RISK_(graffiti_artist), Svetlana Talabolina and many others.
