= Tart Noir =

Tart Noir is a branch of crime fiction that is characterized by strong, independent female detectives with an amount of sexuality often involved. The books in the genre also occasionally feature a murderer protagonist and are sometimes presented in a first person point of view. Tart Noir was labeled and effectively created as a genre by four writers during the 1990s, Sparkle Hayter, Lauren Henderson, Katy Munger, and Stella Duffy. Some of these writers have since collaborated on book signings and other events in order to promote the genre, along with creating a website called Tartcity.com.

== Style and requirements ==
The storylines and characters described in a Tart Noir novel includes the necessity of a heroine who is "tough enough to take on criminals and cops" and yet still have the personality of being able to be "tender enough to love a man with rough edges". The requirements were described by Stella Duffy as the novel needing to be "maybe comedic, maybe violent, maybe sexual, definitely new-woman, neo-feminist, strong, smart and sharp."

== History ==
The four writers first met at one of the many writers conferences that they attended. It was during one of these times in 1999 that they "realized they were writing the same sort of thing" and discussed doing events together under the banner Slut Noir. Sparkle Hayter changed the named to Tart Noir and decided to create a website in lieu of doing events. When asked why they had decided on the name of Tart Noir for the genre, Hayter explained that slut was a "powerless word" and that "'tart' sounded like a lot more fun". After bringing other women into the webzine, including Jennifer Blue, Tony Fennelly, Max Adams and J.J. Buch, Hayter edited the launch issue, then moved on to other projects. Munger took over editing, maintenance and expansion of the website.

Since its beginnings, the genre has grown to include more than twenty other writers who have self-styled themselves as writers of Tart Noir. This is shown by the fact that exactly twenty Tart Noir writers have come together to write an anthology of original stories in the genre, itself titled Tart Noir. The anthology was commissioned in 2002 by Stella Duffy and Lauren Henderson. One of those writers, Vicki Hendricks, describes herself as the first Tart Noir writer in the United States.

Tart Noir was featured prominently in 2001 by Lauren Henderson at the "SheKilda" convention, which was the "first-ever women's crime convention".

== See also ==
- Detective fiction
- Mystery fiction
- Film noir
