= Plastic Jesus (artist) =

British street artist

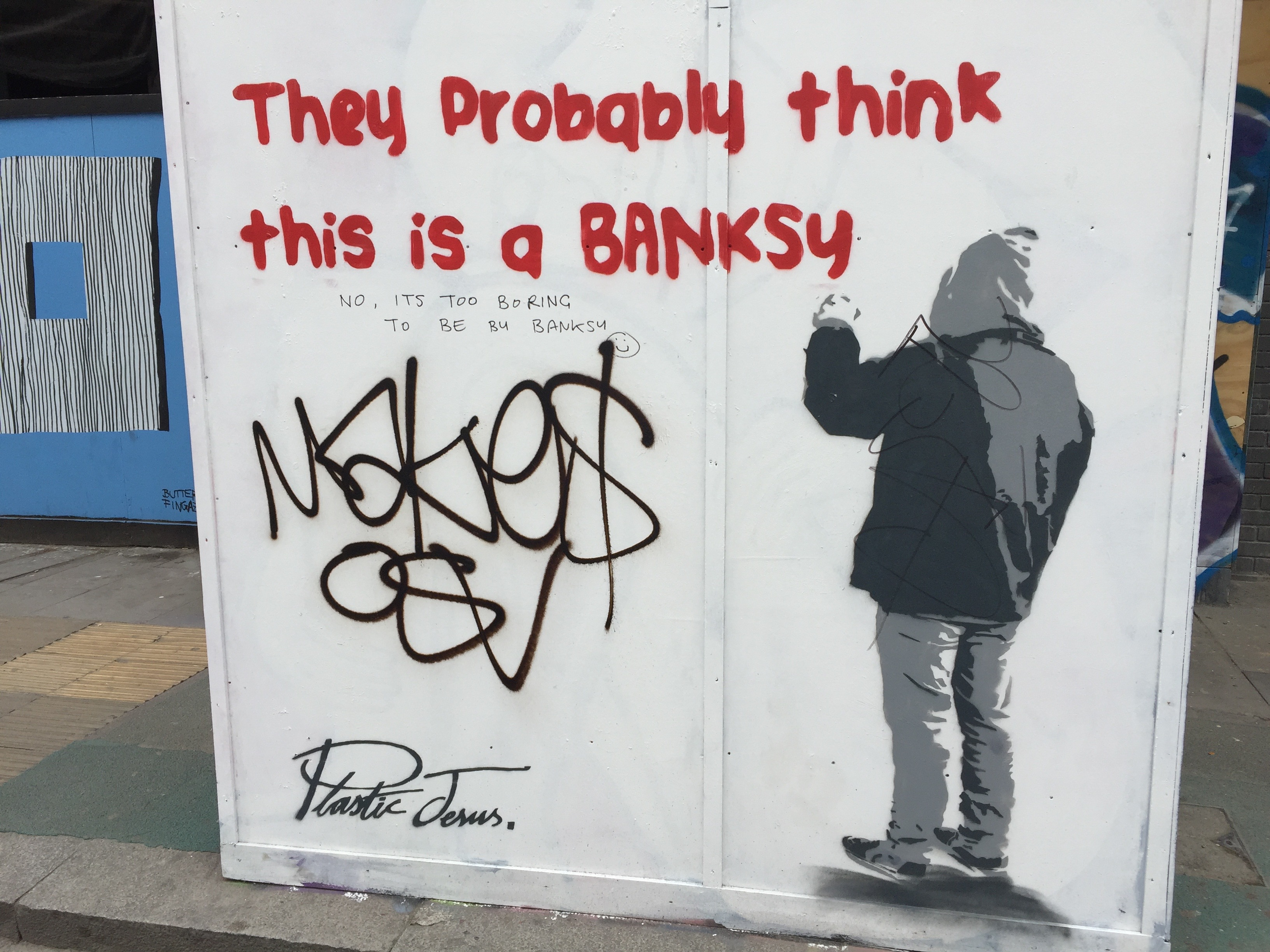
- London street art by Plastic Jesus, 2017
- Born: London, United Kingdom
- Known for: street art, contemporary art, collaborations
- Movement: contemporary art, street art
- Website: www.plasticjesus.net

Plastic Jesus is an anonymous street artist of British descent, labeled by the Daily Beast as the "Banksy of L.A.". Plastic Jesus produces provocative and subversive street installations, including a 6-inch wall he circled around Donald Trump's star on the Hollywood Walk of Fame in 2016.

== Street art ==
Plastic Jesus trained as a photojournalist before shifting from photography to street installations to better address major sociopolitical and cultural issues.

=== "Best Buy, Useless Plastic Box", 2013 ===
In 2013, Plastic Jesus targeted the Best Buy chain, covertly placing black boxes that he constructed alongside the store's high-priced electronics. The boxes had fake price tags for $99.99 and labels that read: "Useless Plastic box 1.2. Another gadget you don't really need. Will not work once you get it home. New model out in 4 weeks. Battery life is too short to be of use." The intention of the project was to comment on the United States' infatuation with technology and need to own its latest trends.

=== Oscar Installations, 2014-ongoing ===
Days before the 2014 Academy Awards, Plastic Jesus installed a life-sized golden statue of an Oscar injecting heroin in his arm in Hollywood. The installation appeared shortly after actor Philip Seymour Hoffman died from a heroin overdose. With this piece, as well as a life-sized golden Oscar snorting cocaine he installed the following year, Plastic Jesus focuses a spotlight on drug abuse within the entertainment industry. In 2016, Plastic Jesus installed his first female Oscar, a golden stripper referencing the objectification of women in Hollywood; in 2017, it was the rapper Kanye West re-imagined as a golden, crucified Jesus.

In 2018, Plastic Jesus created a life-size golden statue of Harvey Weinstein in a bathrobe, seated on a casting couch and holding an Academy Award.

=== "No Kardashian Parking Anytime", 2015 ===
In 2015, Los Angeles mayor Eric Garcetti implemented a six-month testing period where new street signs designed to improve parking conditions would be put up throughout the city. Plastic Jesus added his own street signs to the mix that read "No Kardashian Parking Anytime," to offer his perspective on our culture's obsession with celebrities and false idols, including the Kardashian family. The artist intended for the signs to be both a critique of reality television and also an indictment of the city for enabling the paparazzi to swarm public places.

=== Donald Trump's Hollywood Walk of Fame Star, 2016 ===
In 2016, then-Republican Presidential nominee Donald Trump announced his plan to build a wall alongside the border between the United States and Mexico to prevent illegal immigrants from entering the country. As a response against this plan, Plastic Jesus built a 6-inch concrete wall topped with razor wire, miniature U.S. flags and signs that read 'Keep Out' written in both Spanish and English to encircle Trump's star on the Hollywood Walk of Fame. Trump received the star in 2007 for his role on The Apprentice; before Plastic Jesus' installation, it had been vandalized on several occasions.

=== Donald Trump Internment Camp Signs, 2017 ===
In the wake of the 2016 Presidential election, Plastic Jesus was inspired again to use Donald Trump as fodder for his art, this time commenting on Trump's executive order on immigration. The artist crafted a series of signs that he posted on vacant lots and building sites in cities throughout the country with the text "Lot Reserved For: Future Internment Camp" printed above an image of the United States' Seal. The signs draw a connection between Trump's travel ban and the internment of Japanese Americans during World War II; for instance, the text "Executive Order 9066" is a direct reference to the order originally signed in 1942 by Franklin D. Roosevelt to forcibly remove Japanese Americans from their homes and place them in internment camps.
