= Lady in the Lake (TV series) =

2024 American miniseries

- Promotional poster
- Genre: Period drama; Mystery
- Created by: Alma Har'el
- Based on: Lady in the Lake by Laura Lippman
- Written by: Alma Har'el; Briana Belser; Nambi E. Kelley; Boaz Yakin; Sheila Wilson
- Directed by: Alma Har'el
- Starring: Natalie Portman; Moses Ingram; Y'lan Noel; Brett Gelman; Byron Bowers; Noah Jupe; Josiah Cross; Mikey Madison; Pruitt Taylor Vince
- Theme music composer: Marcus Norris
- Country of origin: United States
- Original language: English
- No. of episodes: 7

Production
- Executive producers: Alma Har'el; Natalie Portman; Boaz Yakin; Amy Kaufman; Layne Eskridge; Christopher Leggett; Jean-Marc Vallée; Nathan Ross; Julie Gardner; Laura Lippman; Sophie Mas
- Producers: Amanda Lencioni; Sheila Wilson
- Production locations: Baltimore, Maryland
- Cinematography: Lachlan Milne
- Editors: Alma Har’el; Yael Hersonski; Dominic LaPerriere
- Running time: 44–54 minutes
- Production companies: MountainA; Bad Wolf America; Crazyrose; Zusa; Fifth Season

Original release
- Network: Apple TV+
- Release: July 19 – August 23, 2024

Lady in the Lake is an American period drama television miniseries based on the novel of the same name by Laura Lippman, and starring Natalie Portman and Moses Ingram. Set during the 1960s, Lady in the Lake begins in Baltimore, with the disappearance of a young Jewish girl, Tessie Durst, at a Christmas parade. The series premiered on Apple TV+ on July 19, 2024. The series was generally well received, with Portman and Ingram receiving acclaim for their performances.

== Premise ==
In 1960s Baltimore, Maddie Schwartz, an investigative journalist working on an unsolved murder, clashes with a woman working to advance the agenda of the city's Black community. Maddie leaves her overbearing husband and Pikesville home to pursue a career as a newspaper reporter.

She becomes obsessed with unraveling the mystery of two separate killings: those of eleven-year-old Tessie Durst and a bartender named Cleo Johnson.

== Cast ==
=== Main ===
- Natalie Portman as Maddie Schwartz
- Moses Ingram as Cleo Johnson
- Y'lan Noel as Ferdie Platt
- Brett Gelman as Milton Schwartz
- Byron Bowers as Slappy Johnson
- Noah Jupe as Seth Schwartz
- Josiah Cross as Reggie Robinson
- Mikey Madison as Judith Weinstein
- Pruitt Taylor Vince as Bob Bauer

=== Recurring ===
- Wood Harris as Shell Gordon
- Dylan Arnold as Stephen Zawadzkie
- Tyrik Johnson as Teddy
- David Corenswet as Allan Durst
- Charlie Hofheimer as Wallace White
- Ronnie Gene Blevins as Officer Boško
- Mindy Goldberg as Tattie Morgenstern

=== Guest ===
- Jennifer Mogbock as Dora Carter
- Bianca Belle as Tessie Durst
- Veralyn Jones as Merva
- Mark Feuerstein as Hal Durst
- Angela Robinson as Myrtle Summer
- Samir Royal as Lionel Johnson
- Hallie Samuels as Mrs. Durst
- Masha Mashkova as Ms. Zawadzkie
- Nikiva Dionne as Patrice Murphy
- David Johnson III as Officer Percy Davis
- Selema Masekela as Cedrick
- Rebecca Spence as Louise Durst
- Daniel London as Dr. Kornblatt
- Sean Ringgold as The Prophet

== Episodes ==
No.	Title	Directed by	Teleplay by	Original release date
1	"Did you know seahorses are fish?"	Alma Har'el	Alma Har'el	July 19, 2024
2	"It has to do with the search for the marvelous."	Alma Har'el	Alma Har'el	July 19, 2024
3	"I was the first to see her dead. You were the last to see her alive."	Alma Har'el	Briana Belser	July 26, 2024
4	"Innocence leaves when you discover cruelty. First in others, then in yourself."	Alma Har'el	Nambi E. Kelley	August 2, 2024
5	"Every time someone turns up dead in that lake, it does seem to lead to you."	Alma Har'el	Boaz Yakin	August 9, 2024
6	"I know who killed Cleo Johnson."	Alma Har'el	Sheila Wilson and Alma Har'el	August 16, 2024
7	"My story."	Alma Har'el	Boaz Yakin	August 23, 2024

== Production ==
=== Writing ===
The television series is based on the novel of the same name. Laura Lippman, the author, took inspiration from two real-life murders that happened in her youth. The first was the abduction and murder of 11-year-old Esther Lebowitz, a white Jewish girl whose case was widely publicized. The second death was of 33-year-old Shirley Parker, a Black mother and bartender who disappeared and whose body was found in the fountain of the Druid Hill Park Reservoir. Parker's death was covered only in African-American newspapers, specifically the Baltimore Afro-American.

=== Casting ===
The miniseries was given the greenlight in March 2021, with Natalie Portman and Lupita Nyong'o set to star, and Alma Har'el set to direct all episodes of the series. In April 2022, Y'Lan Noel, Mikey Madison and Brett Gelman were added to the cast. In May 2022, Nyong'o exited the series. Moses Ingram was cast in June to replace her. Noah Jupe, Mike Epps, Byron Bowers. Josiah Cross and Pruitt Taylor Vince were added in July.

=== Filming ===
Filming began in April 2022, with production taking place in Baltimore. Production paused briefly in late August 2022, when the production purportedly received threats of violence while filming in the city. Police investigation showed the threats to have been unsubstantiated.

== Reception ==
=== Critical response ===
The review aggregator website Rotten Tomatoes reported a 75% approval rating with an average rating of 7/10, based on 65 critic reviews. The website's critics consensus reads, "Dense with intriguing drama if too muddled by digressions and stylistic flourishes, Lady in the Lake is a well-acted mystery with a lot on its mind." Metacritic, which uses a weighted average, assigned a score of 61 out of 100 based on 31 critics, indicating "generally favorable" reviews. Natalie Portman received critical acclaim for her acting performance in the miniseries.

=== Accolades ===
In 2025, Lady in the Lake won the Set Decorators Society of America Award for Best Achievement in Décor/Design of a Television Movie or Limited Series, recognizing set decorator Karuna Karmarkar and production designer JC Molina. That same year, Marcus Norris won a BMI Streaming Series Award for his music for the series.

The series was nominated for the 2025 Visual Effects Society Award for Outstanding Supporting Visual Effects in a Photoreal Episode.
