= Every Secret Thing (film) =

- Theatrical release poster
- Directed by: Amy J. Berg
- Written by: Nicole Holofcener
- Based on: Every Secret Thing by Laura Lippman
- Produced by: Anthony Bregman; Frances McDormand
- Starring: Diane Lane; Elizabeth Banks; Dakota Fanning; Danielle Macdonald; Nate Parker; Common
- Cinematography: Rob Hardy
- Edited by: Ron Patane; Billy McMillan
- Music by: Robin Coudert
- Production companies: Hyde Park Entertainment; Likely Story; Merced Media Partners; PalmStar Media Capital
- Distributed by: Starz Digital
- Release dates: April 20, 2014 (Tribeca Film Festival); May 15, 2015 (United States)
- Running time: 94 minutes
- Country: United States
- Language: English
- Box office: $103,536

Every Secret Thing is a 2014 American crime film directed by Amy J. Berg and written by Nicole Holofcener, based on a 2004 novel of the same name written by Laura Lippman. The film stars Diane Lane, Elizabeth Banks, Dakota Fanning, Danielle Macdonald, and Nate Parker, and is notable for being Academy Award-winning actress Frances McDormand's debut as producer. The film was released theatrically on May 15, 2015 and on home video on August 4, 2015.

== Plot ==
The movie is told in non-chronological order, with present scenes intercut with flashbacks that slowly reveal the details of the past as the movie progresses.

18-year-old Ronnie Fuller and Alice Manning have just been released from Juvenile Hall after serving 7 years for the kidnapping and murder of the bi-racial infant granddaughter of the county's first black judge. When asked about the crime, Alice continually insists that she is innocent, a victim of Ronnie's machinations, including Ronnie planting her jack in the box at the scene of the murder to frame her. In flashback we see the girls walking home from a pool party, when Ronnie sees the baby unattended in a stroller on a porch. Despite Alice's pleas not to, Ronnie takes the baby and runs off with her, insisting to Alice that they can take better care of the baby and that it is theirs now.

In the present Ronnie is working at a bagel shop in town, while Alice spends most of her days apparently aimlessly walking around town eating junk food, but lying and telling her mother she is searching for employment as per her request. Alice also secretly dreams of finding validation through reality TV stardom, and is shown several times practicing a speech about being a "victim" of the justice system. Alice's mother Helen Manning is a teacher at the elementary school, and it is apparent she and her daughter have a contentious relationship. Helen is ashamed of Alice being overweight, her unsophisticated tastes, and her lack of interest in the kind of things Helen likes. It is also shown in flashback that before the kidnapping Alice and Ronnie were forced to hang out and go to the pool party together by Helen, who showed favoritism toward Ronnie in front of Alice.

Two weeks after Ronnie and Alice return home a couple are shopping in a furniture store with their young bi-racial daughter, Brittany Lyttle. While the couple are arguing about couches their daughter goes missing, prompting panic. The two detectives assigned to the case that come to visit the parents include detective Nancy Porter, who worked on the Fuller/Manning case, which still haunts and traumatizes her. Soon the connection between the current case and the previous kidnapping becomes apparent, including the resemblance between Brittany and the previous kidnap victim. Porter and her partner question both Alice and Ronnie. Ronnie is evasive and withdrawn, while Alice tries to subtly suggest Ronnie is responsible.

Porter and her partner then dig into the girls' lives during juvenile hall and discover some disturbing truths. Ronnie tried to kill herself several times and frequently got into fights. But more alarmingly, it turns out Alice gave birth to a bi-racial baby girl in prison. Bringing in both Alice and Helen for questioning, the truth begins to unravel. It turns out at age 15 in Juvenile Hall Alice fell into a sexual relationship with a janitor named Rodrigo who worked there, and who was eventually fired when their affair was uncovered. By the time Alice realized she was pregnant it was too late for her mother to force her to get an abortion, so instead she forced her into relinquishing the child for adoption. According to Helen, Alice remained fixated on her child, obsessing over it endlessly. In an attempt to placate Alice, Helen lied to her, saying that she had seen her child living with a family in a nice part of town. She said that the girl had beautiful curly hair, and had a heart shaped birthmark on her back. However, unknown to Helen, upon being released from prison, Alice reconnected with Rodrigo, the janitor who had previously impregnated her. Alice’s supposedly aimless "walking" had actually been her combing the town, searching for her child. Upon seeing Brittany in the furniture store Alice took her and found that she had a heart-shaped birthmark on her back. Believing Brittany to be her child, Alice took her with the help of Rodrigo, who then took the child to stay at his mother’s house. Their plan was to keep Brittany there while Alice framed Ronnie for the crime, after which they would go be with their child. After being shown birth certificates that proved Brittany was not her child, Alice was convinced by Porter to take her to Rodrigo's mother's house, where Porter collects Brittany. This is intercut with Ronnie at home in her bathroom, where still overwhelmed by guilt over the original kidnapping and murder, she commits suicide by slitting her wrists in the bathtub. Porter returns Brittany safely to her grateful and tearful parents.

It is revealed shortly after that Alice made a deal with the district attorney, and that all charges against her have been dropped while Rodrigo is arrested for the kidnapping and statutory rape. Porter and Jones watch in disgust as Alice revels in the media attention, and gives the speech she practiced about being an innocent victim of the justice system for the news cameras. Finally, the details of the first kidnapping are revealed. It shows Ronnie worrying about the baby, and begging Alice to let her take the baby back. Alice is then shown manipulating and forcing Ronnie into strangling the baby, running away as Ronnie does it. Horrified, Ronnie goes to Helen and confesses what has happened. Helen says that she can make sure that Alice is punished equally along with Ronnie, and we discover that it was Helen who gave Ronnie Alice's jack in the box, telling her to plant it at the scene of the crime. Finally, in the last scene we are again shown the porch on the day of the original kidnapping, except this time Alice is shown standing over the baby carriage instead of Ronnie.

== Cast ==
- Diane Lane as Helen Manning
- Elizabeth Banks as Detective Nancy Porter
- Dakota Fanning as Ronnie Fuller
  - Eva Grace Kellner as Young Ronnie Fuller
- Danielle Macdonald as Alice Manning
  - Brynne Norquist as Young Alice Manning
- Nate Parker as Detective Kevin Jones
- Common as Devlin Hatch
- Colin Donnell as Paul Porter
- Bill Sage as Dave Fuller
- Tonye Patano as Clarice
- Julito McCullum as Rodrigo
- Clare Foley as Mary Paige
- Lily Pilblad as Jeanne
- Renée Elise Goldsberry as Cynthia Barnes
- Sarah Sokolovic as Maveen Lyttle
- Jack Gore as Tommy (uncredited)

== Production ==
=== Development and writing ===
On August 10, 2010, Deadline Hollywood reported that actress Frances McDormand had bought the rights to the 2004 crime novel Every Secret Thing written by Laura Lippman, and that she would produce the film with a business partner, Anthony Bregman. On July 31, 2012, Variety posted the news that Nicole Holofcener had dramatized the script for the film from Lippman's novel and Amy J. Berg was slated to direct the film; it would mark her narrative directorial debut.

=== Casting ===
Diane Lane, who was added to the cast by producer McDormand, was signed to the role of Helen Manning, the mother of Alice Manning, an 18-year-old girl who becomes a suspect in the disappearance of a missing child. On September 9, Elizabeth Banks also signed to co-star with Lane. Banks's character, Detective Nancy Porter, finds herself emotionally involved in the case. On February 7, 2013, Dakota Fanning and Danielle Macdonald joined Lane and Banks in the cast of the film. Fanning was signed for the lead, Veronica "Ronnie" Fuller, 18-year-old, who is suspected in the disappearance of a missing child. Macdonald was signed to the role of 18-year-old Alice Manning, who is also suspected in the missing child's disappearance. Nate Parker also joined the cast in March 2013, in the role of a police officer partnered with Banks.

=== Filming ===
Principal photography of the film began in March 2013 in New York City.

== Release ==
=== Theatrical ===
Every Secret Thing premiered in the Spotlight section at the Tribeca Film Festival in April 2014. The film generated a fair amount of buzz at the festival and sold out all of its three screenings and a fourth screening was added that also sold out. The film got positive reviews. The actors were particularly praised, especially Diane Lane's performance.

It was widely reported in October 2014 that Starz and Anchor Bay Entertainment had acquired the rights to distribute Every Secret Thing in the United States. The deal was completed shortly after the Toronto Film Festival at which the film was again widely acclaimed. WME Global negotiated the deal on behalf of the filmmakers and it was for theatrical release, home video and pay TV.

"This is an amazing film," said Kevin Kasha, head of acquisitions for Starz. "It's a gripping story with a great cast and we're excited to have it on Starz and to handle distribution via Starz Digital Media and Anchor Bay." "Every Secret Thing is a remarkable collaboration of females in film and offers a unique look into the minds of teenagers," commented Amy Berg. "I am so pleased it will be in theatres in the spring."

On March 12, 2015, the film was screened at a New York Film Critics Series event and a Question and Answer session was conducted afterwards with stars Diane Lane and Dakota Fanning, director Amy Berg, and producer Frances McDormand. This was a pre-release event, with the actual theatrical release date being later in May 2015.

=== Marketing ===
The trailer, website and poster became active and available on April 15, 2015, officially announcing the film's theatrical release date for May 15, 2015.

== Reception ==
=== Box office ===
Every Secret Thing grossed $103,536 in the United States and Canada.

=== Critical response ===
On review aggregator Rotten Tomatoes, the film has an approval rating of 32% based on 38 reviews, with an average rating of 5.26/10. The site's critical consensus reads, "Every Secret Thing has a sterling pedigree both on and off the screen, yet all that talent adds up to little more than a listless, predictable thriller." On Metacritic, the film has a score of 46 out of 100, based on 15 reviews, indicating "mixed or average" reviews.
