= The Sub-Saharan Informer =

Pan-African newspaper

- Type: Weekly newspaper (defunct)
- Founded: 1999
- Website: www.ssinformer.com

The Sub-Saharan Informer was a Pan African newspaper produced weekly across several countries of Sub-Saharan Africa. It was established in 1999.

It's no longer in production.
