= Lady in the Lake (novel) =

Novel by Laura Lippman

- Author: Laura Lippman
- Language: English
- Publisher: William Morrow and Company
- Publication date: 2019
- ISBN: 978-0-06-239001-1 (first edition, hardcover)
- Dewey Decimal: 813.54
- LC Class: PS3562.I586 L33

Lady in the Lake is a 2019 novel by Laura Lippman, published by William Morrow and Company. It was adapted by Alma Har'el into the miniseries of the same name on Apple TV+.

== Background ==
Lippman was inspired to write the book by two unrelated deaths in Baltimore in 1969: the murder of 11-year-old Esther Lebowitz, and the mysterious death of Shirley Parker, a 33-year-old black woman. Lippman first learned about the latter death, which was underreported, while working at The Baltimore Sun.

== Premise ==
A bored Jewish housewife leaves her husband and moves to downtown Baltimore to become an investigative reporter. She soon begins unraveling the mystery behind the murder of a black bartender and a young Jewish girl. The book deals with themes of racism and misogyny in 1960s America.

== Reception ==
Author Stephen King gave the novel a positive review in The New York Times, calling it "extraordinary", and praising the novel's use of plot twists and characterizations. Kirkus Reviews gave the book a starred review and called it "a stylish, sexy, suspenseful period drama about a newsroom and the city it covers." It also received a starred review from Publishers Weekly, whose reviewer wrote that it "captures the era's zeitgeist while painting a striking portrait of unapologetic female ambition." Clémence Michallon of The Independent praised the novel's characters and realistic portrayal of 1960s Baltimore.

== Adaptation ==
The book has been adapted for television as an Apple TV+ limited series, Lady in the Lake, starring Natalie Portman and Moses Ingram. It premiered in July 2024.
