= Katy Munger =

Crime fiction and mystery author

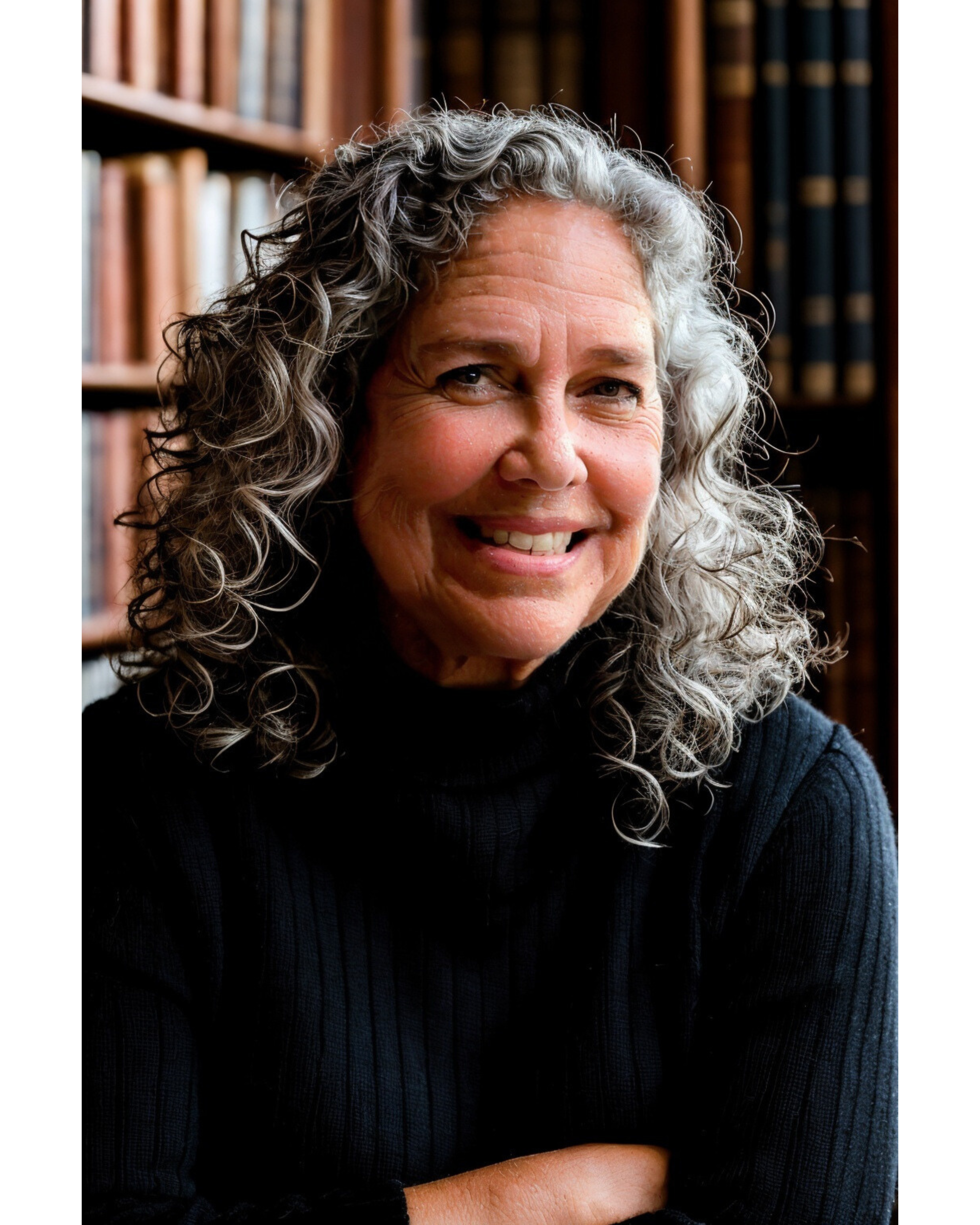
- Born: December 29, 1957 (age 68) Honolulu, Territory of Hawaii
- Occupation: Crime fiction and mystery author
- Period: 1991–present
- Notable works: Casey Jones, Hubbert & Lil, Dead Detective
- Notable awards: Ellen Nehr Award

Website
- katymunger.com

Katy Munger (born December 29, 1957), who has also written under the names Gallagher Gray and Chaz McGee, is an American mystery author known for writing the Casey Jones, Hubbert & Lil, and Dead Detective series. She is a former reviewer for The Washington Post.

== Biography ==
Born in Honolulu, Hawaii, she soon moved to Raleigh, North Carolina, growing up with her five brothers and sisters. She describes herself as a "southern belle" and says that Casey Jones was influenced by her own character.

Munger began her writing career by publishing under the pseudonym Gallagher Gray. She wrote four books in the Hubbert & Lil series using this pseudonym in the 1990s, and later released a fifth book in the series under her own name. Hubbert & Lil follows Auntie Lil, an eccentric 84-year-old retiree who embarks on a new career as an amateur crime sleuth, aided by her buttoned-down 55-year-old nephew, T.S. Hubbert. Munger describes this series as "cozier" and "gentler" than her other novels. The most recent installment in the series, Hubbert & Lil: Too Old To Die, was published in 2023.

Munger also debuted her Casey Jones series in the late '90s. The series revolves around its titular character, Casey Jones, a no-nonsense Southern detective with a propensity for wisecracking and getting in over her head. Casey is aided in her investigations by a colorful cast of characters, including her doughnut-obsessed business partner Bobby D. The series' most recent entry, Casey Jones: Fire and Rain, was published in 2019.

Munger released her third project in 2009, the four-book Dead Detective series, which follows Kevin Fahey, a former alcoholic and incompetent detective who is "trapped in a lonely plane between the living and the dead." Throughout the series, Fahey attempts to confront the mistakes he made in life in order to move on to a better place. In 2012, Munger released the fourth and most recent book in the series, Dead Detective: A Walk Among Souls.

Munger resides in North Carolina’s Research Triangle, the same setting as many of her books, and remains active in local writing and crime fiction communities. In 2011, she co-founded Thalia Press with author Lise McClendon. Described as an "author's co-op," Thalia Press publishes crime and contemporary fiction by established authors looking to reissue previously out-of-print titles or release new works.

In 2023, she began co-publishing a quarterly literary magazine, Dark Yonder, with fellow North Carolina author Eryk Pruitt. This anthology series features noir-themed short stories written by best-selling and emerging authors.

== Tart Noir ==
Munger's genre of writing is described as Tart Noir, which is a subsection of crime fiction created in part by Munger. In publicizing the genre, she has teamed up with the three other creators and writers, Sparkle Hayter, Laura Lippman, and Lauren Henderson, for book signings and other venues. It is believed that the authors first met and befriended each other by "getting drunk together at writers conferences". Not long afterwards, the four worked together in creating and promoting their new website, titled Tartcity.com. Munger and a collection of 19 other Tart Noir writers also came together to write an anthology of original stories in 2002.

== Awards ==
- 2002, American Crime Writers League's "Ellen Nehr Award"

== Works ==
=== Hubbert & Lil series (as Gallagher Gray/Katy Munger) ===
- Partners In Crime (1991)
- A Cast Of Killers (1992)
- Death Of A Dream Maker (1995)
- Motive For Murder (1996)
- Too Old To Die (2023)

=== Casey Jones series ===
- Legwork (1997)
- Out of Time (1998)
- Money to Burn (1999)
- Bad to the Bone (2000)
- Better Off Dead (2001)
- Bad Moon on the Rise (2009)
- Fire and Rain (2019)

=== Dead Detective series (as Chaz McGee/Katy Munger) ===
- The First Goodbye (2009)
- The Innocence Killer (2010)
- A Dance with Darkness (2011)
- A Walk Among Souls (2012)
