= Laura Lippman =

American detective fiction writer

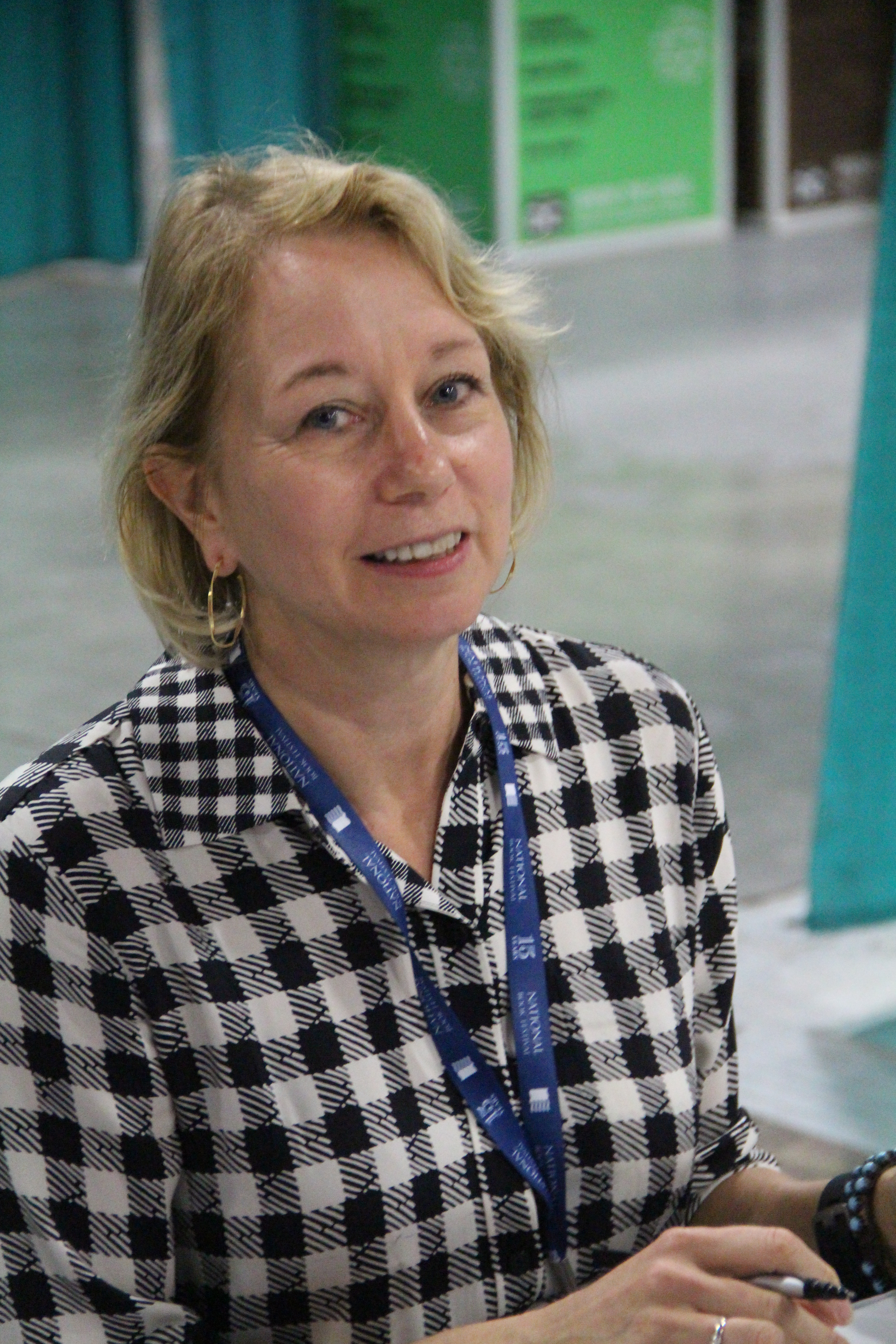
- Lippman at the 2015 National Book Festival
- Born: January 31, 1959 (age 67); Atlanta, Georgia, U.S.
- Education: Northwestern University Medill School of Journalism, Wilde Lake High School
- Occupation: Author
- Spouse: David Simon (m. 2006; div. 2024)
- Children: 1
- Writing career
- Subject: Detective fiction
- Notable awards: Agatha, Anthony, Edgar, Nero, Barry, Macavity, Strand and Shamus
- Website: www.lauralippman.com

Laura Lippman (born January 31, 1959) is an American journalist and author of over 20 detective fiction novels. Her novels have won multiple awards, including an Agatha Award, seven Anthony Awards, two Barry Awards, an Edgar Award, a Gumshoe Award, a Macavity Award, a Nero Award, two Shamus Awards, and two Strand Critics Award.

== Biography ==
Lippman was born in Atlanta, Georgia and raised in Columbia, Maryland. She is the daughter of Theo Lippman, Jr., a writer at The Baltimore Sun, and Madeline Mabry Lippman, now retired as a school librarian for the Baltimore City Public School System. Her paternal grandfather was Jewish, and the remainder of her ancestry is Scots-Irish. Lippman was raised Presbyterian. She attended high school in Columbia, Maryland, where she was the captain of the Wilde Lake High School It's Academic team. She also participated in several dramatic productions, including Finian's Rainbow, The Lark, and Barefoot in the Park. She graduated from Wilde Lake High School in 1977.

Lippman is a former reporter for the now defunct San Antonio Light and The Baltimore Sun. She is best known for writing a series of novels set in Baltimore and featuring Tess Monaghan, a reporter turned private investigator. Lippman's works have won the Agatha, Anthony, Edgar, Nero, Gumshoe and Shamus awards. What the Dead Know (2007), was the first of her books to make the New York Times Best Seller list, and was shortlisted for the Crime Writers' Association Gold Dagger Award.

In addition to the Tess Monaghan novels, Lippman has written works independent of that character. Her novel Every Secret Thing was adapted as a 2014 movie starring Diane Lane. Her novel Lady in the Lake was adapted as a limited series for Apple TV.

Lippman lives in the South Baltimore neighborhood of Federal Hill and frequently writes in the neighborhood coffee shop Spoons. In addition to writing, she teaches at Goucher College in Towson, Maryland, just outside Baltimore. In January 2007, Lippman taught at the 3rd Annual Writers in Paradise at Eckerd College. In March 2013, she was the guest of honor at Left Coast Crime.

== Representation in other media ==
The character Bunk is shown to be reading one of her books, In a Strange City, in episode eight of the first season of The Wire. Lippman appeared in a scene in the first episode of the last season of The Wire as a reporter working in the Baltimore Sun newsroom.

== Personal life ==
In 2000, Lippman began dating and soon living with David Simon, another former Baltimore Sun reporter. He became the creator and an executive producer of the HBO series The Wire (which premiered in 2002). They lived in a "narrow brick row house", in Baltimore's Federal Hill neighborhood.

In 2006, Lippman married Simon in a ceremony officiated by filmmaker John Waters. She had been married to another man for seven years, which ended in a "difficult divorce." Simon had been married twice before. Lippman and Simon have a daughter who was born in 2010.

Lippman and Simon separated in 2020, divorcing in 2024. The two continue to co-parent their daughter.

== Awards ==
In a Strange City (2001) was a New York Times Notable Book of the Year.

What the Dead Know was a New York Times Best Seller.

In 2014, Lippman won the inaugural Pinckley Prize for a Distinguished Body of Work.

Awards for Lippman's writing
Year	Title	Award	Result	Ref.
1998	Baltimore Blues	Shamus Award for Best First Novel	Finalist	
1998	Charm City	Anthony Award for Best Paperback Original	Finalist	
1998	Charm City	Edgar Allan Poe Award for Best Paperback Original	Won	
1998	Charm City	Macavity Award for Best First Novel	Finalist	
1998	Charm City	Shamus Award for Best Paperback Original	Won	
1999	Butchers Hill	Agatha Award for Best Novel	Won	
1999	Butchers Hill	Anthony Award for Best Paperback Original	Won	
1999	Butchers Hill	Edgar Allan Poe Award for Best Paperback Original	Finalist	
1999	Butchers Hill	Macavity Award for Best Novel	Finalist	
1999	Butchers Hill	Shamus Award for Best Paperback Original	Finalist	
1999	In Big Trouble	Agatha Award for Best Novel	Finalist	
2000	In Big Trouble	Anthony Award for Best Paperback Original	Won	
2000	In Big Trouble	Edgar Allan Poe Award for Best Paperback Original	Finalist	
2000	In Big Trouble	Shamus Award for Best Paperback Original	Won	
2000	The Sugar House	Nero Award	Won	
2003	Every Secret Thing	Hammett Prize	Finalist	
2003	The Last Place	Shamus Award for Best Novel	Finalist	
2004	By a Spider’s Thread	Agatha Award for Best Novel	Finalist	
2004	Every Secret Thing	Anthony Award for Best Novel	Won	
2004	Every Secret Thing	Barry Award for Best Novel	Won	
2005	By a Spider’s Thread	Anthony Award for Best Novel	Finalist	
2005	By a Spider’s Thread	Edgar Allan Poe Award for Best Novel	Finalist	
2006	To the Power of Three	Anthony Award for Best Novel	Finalist	
2006	To the Power of Three	Gumshoe Award for Best Mystery	Won	
2007	No Good Deeds	Anthony Award for Best Novel	Won	
2008	"Hardly Knew Her" from Dead Man's Hand	Anthony Award for Best Short Story	Won	
2008	What the Dead Know	Anthony Award for Best Novel	Won	
2008	What the Dead Know	Barry Award for Best Novel	Won	
2008	What the Dead Know	Gold Dagger Award	Finalist	
2008	What the Dead Know	Macavity Award for Best Novel	Won	
2009	Life Sentences	Strand Critics Award for Best Mystery Novel	Finalist	
2009	“Scratch a Woman” in Hardly Knew Her	Macavity Award for Best Short Story	Finalist	
2011	I’d Know You Anywhere	Anthony Award for Best Novel	Finalist	
2011	I’d Know You Anywhere	Edgar Allan Poe Award for Best Novel	Finalist	
2015	After I'm Gone	Anthony Award for Best Novel	Won	
2015	After I'm Gone	Strand Critics Award for Best Mystery Novel	Won	
2017	Wilde Lake	Anthony Award for Best Novel	Finalist	
2017	Wilde Lake	Barry Award for Best Novel	Finalist	
2017	Wilde Lake	Macavity Award for Best Mystery Novel	Finalist	
2019	Sunburn	Anthony Award for Best Novel	Finalist	
2019	Sunburn	Strand Critics Award for Best Mystery Novel	Won	
2020	Lady in the Lake	Anthony Award for Best Novel	Finalist	
2020	Lady in the Lake	Macavity Award for Best Mystery Novel	Finalist	
2020	Lady in the Lake	Strand Critics Award for Best Mystery Novel	Finalist	
2021	Dream Girl	Strand Critics Award for Best Mystery Novel	Finalist	
2022	Dream Girl	CWA Ian Fleming Steel Dagger	Finalist	

== Publications ==
=== Tess Monaghan series ===
- Baltimore Blues (1997). ISBN 0380788756
- Charm City (1997). ISBN 0380788764
- Butchers Hill (1998). ISBN 0380798468
- In Big Trouble (1999). ISBN 0380798476
- The Sugar House (2000). ISBN 0380978172
- In a Strange City (2001). ISBN 0380978180
- The Last Place (2002). ISBN 0380978199
- By A Spider's Thread (2004). ISBN 0060506695
- No Good Deeds (2006). ISBN 978-0060570729
- Another Thing to Fall (2008). ISBN 978-0061128875
- The Girl in the Green Raincoat (2011). ISBN 978-0061938368
- Hush, Hush (2015). ISBN 978-0062083425

==== Short stories ====
- "Orphans' Court" (1999) (short story in First Cases: Volume 3, edited by Robert J. Randisi)
- "Ropa Vieja" (2001) (short story in Murderers Row, edited by Otto Penzler)
- "The Shoeshine Man's Regrets" (2004) (short story in Murder and All That Jazz, edited by Robert J. Randisi)

=== Standalone works ===
==== Novels ====
- Every Secret Thing (2004). ISBN 0060506679
- To The Power of Three (2005). ISBN 0060506725
- What the Dead Know (2007). ISBN 978-0061128851 (Little Sister in the UK)
- Life Sentences (2009). ISBN 978-0061128899
- I'd Know You Anywhere (2010). ISBN 978-0061706554 (Don't Look Back in the UK)
- The Most Dangerous Thing (2011). ISBN 978-0061706516
- And When She Was Good (2012). ISBN 978-0061706875
- After I'm Gone (2014). ISBN 978-0062083395
- Wilde Lake (2016). ISBN 978-0062083456
- Sunburn (2018). ISBN 978-0062389923
- Lady in the Lake (2019). ISBN 978-0062390011
- Dream Girl: A Novel (2021). ISBN 978-0063204652
- Prom Mom (2023). ISBN 9780062998064
- Murder Takes A Vacation (2025). ISBN 978-0062998101

==== Short story collections ====
- Baltimore Noir (2006). ISBN 978-1888451962 (editor and contributed one story)
- Hardly Knew Her: Stories (2008). ISBN 978-0061584992
- Seasonal Work: Stories (2022). ISBN 978-0063000032

==== Memoir ====
- Summer of Fall (2023). ISBN 978-1094455402 (Scribd original)

== See also ==
- Tart Noir
- Katy Munger
