= Informant (psychiatry) =

Third party who can report on a psychiatric case for a doctor

In psychiatry, an informant is someone who can report on a case without causing observer effects. For example, informants may be family members or friends of a psychiatric patient. Informants are particularly important when the patient's lucidity is questionable; for example, in cases of dementia, or when the patient is a child.

Data collected from informants must be used with caution, because informants are rarely in a position to provide completely accurate information. In such cases, it is necessary to interview multiple informants and combine the data. Further compounding the difficulty, informants may also have conditions themselves, which makes them more likely to describe others as having the informant's condition. It is not clear whether this makes them more or less objective than healthy informants.

== See also ==
- Informant Questionnaire on Cognitive Decline in the Elderly
