= Every Secret Thing (novel) =

2004 crime novel by Laura Lippman

First edition (publ. William Morrow)

Every Secret Thing is a 2004 crime novel written by Laura Lippman in 2003.

== Awards ==
- Anthony Awards for Best Novel – 2004
- Barry Award for Best Crime Novel – 2004

== Film adaptation ==
The film adaptation was directed by Amy J. Berg and written by Nicole Holofcener. The film stars Diane Lane, Elizabeth Banks, Dakota Fanning, Danielle Macdonald, and Nate Parker, and is notable for being Academy Award-winning actress Frances McDormand's debut as producer. The film was released theatrically on May 15, 2015 and on home video on August 4, 2015.
