= 3rd Hollywood Critics Association Film Awards =

Hollywood Critics Association Film Awards

- Date: January 9, 2020
- Site: Virtual Presentation via Facebook and YouTube
- Hosted by: Scott Menzel
- Official website: hollywoodcriticsassociation.com

Highlights
- Best Picture: 1917
- Most awards: 1917 (4)
- Most nominations: Once Upon a Time in Hollywood (12)

The 3rd Hollywood Critics Association Film Awards, presented by the Hollywood Critics Association, took place on January 9, 2020, virtually. The ceremony was hosted by HCA Founder Scott Menzel. This was the first award show the association had after renaming to HCA after originally going by the Los Angeles Online Film Critics Society.

The nominations were announced on November 25, 2019.

== Winners and nominees ==
Winners are listed first and highlighted with boldface.

**Best Picture**: **1917**; Booksmart; The Farewell; The Irishman; Jojo Rabbit; Joker; Marriage Story; Once Upon a Time in Hollywood; Parasite; Waves
**Best Female Director**: **Olivia Wilde – Booksmart**; Alma Har'el – Honey Boy; Greta Gerwig – Little Women; Lorene Scafaria – Hustlers; Lulu Wang – The Farewell	**Best Male Director**: **Noah Baumbach – Marriage Story**; Bong Joon-ho – Parasite; Martin Scorsese – The Irishman; Quentin Tarantino – Once Upon a Time in Hollywood; Taika Waititi – Jojo Rabbit
**Best Actor**: **Joaquin Phoenix – Joker as Arthur Fleck / Joker**; Adam Driver – Marriage Story as Charlie Barber; Eddie Murphy – Dolemite Is My Name as Rudy Ray Moore; Leonardo DiCaprio – Once Upon a Time in Hollywood as Rick Dalton; Taron Egerton – Rocketman as Elton John	**Best Actress**: **Lupita Nyong'o – Us as Adelaide Wilson / Red**; Awkwafina – The Farewell as Billi Wang; Charlize Theron – Bombshell as Megyn Kelly; Renee Zellweger – Judy as Judy Garland; Scarlett Johansson – Marriage Story as Nicole Barber
**Best Supporting Actor**: **Joe Pesci – The Irishman as Russell Bufalino**; Brad Pitt – Once Upon a Time in Hollywood as Cliff Booth; Shia LaBeouf – Honey Boy as James Lort; Sterling K. Brown – Waves Ronald Williams; Tom Hanks – A Beautiful Day in the Neighborhood as Fred Rogers	**Best Supporting Actress**: **Jennifer Lopez – Hustlers as Ramona Vega**; Laura Dern – Marriage Story as Nora Fanshaw; Margot Robbie – Once Upon a Time in Hollywood as Sharon Tate; Taylor Russell – Waves as Emily Williams; Zhao Shu-zhen – The Farewell as Nai Nai
**Best Cast Ensemble**: **Knives Out**; Avengers: Endgame; The Irishman; Once Upon a Time in Hollywood; Waves	**Best Animated or VSX Performance**: **Rosa Salazar – Alita: Battle Angel as Alita**; Josh Brolin – Avengers: Endgame as Thanos; Robert De Niro – The Irishman as Frank Sheeran; Ryan Reynolds – Detective Pikachu as Pikachu; Tom Hanks – Toy Story 4 as Woody
**Best Performance by an Actor 23 and Under**: **Noah Jupe – Honey Boy as young Otis Lort**; Roman Griffin Davis – Jojo Rabbit as Jojo Betzler	**Best Performance by an Actress 23 and Under**: **Kaitlyn Dever – Booksmart as Amy Antsler**; Julia Butters – Once Upon a Time in Hollywood as Trudi Frazer; Thomasin McKenzie – Jojo Rabbit as Elsa Korr
**Best Original Screenplay**: **Bong Joon-ho and Han Jin-won – Parasite**; Emily Halpern, Sarah Haskins, Susanna Fogel, and Katie Silberman – Booksmart; Noah Baumbach – Marriage Story; Quentin Tarantino – Once Upon a Time in Hollywood; Rian Johnson – Knives Out	**Best Adapted Screenplay**: **Taika Waititi – Jojo Rabbit**; Anthony McCarten – The Two Popes; Lorene Scafaria – Hustlers; Scott Silver and Todd Phillips – Joker; Steven Zaillian – The Irishman
**Best Action Film**: **1917**; Avengers: Endgame; Captain Marvel; Hobbs & Shaw; John Wick: Chapter 3 – Parabellum	**Best Animated Film**: **Toy Story 4**; Abominable; Frozen 2; How to Train Your Dragon: The Hidden World; Missing Link
**Best Comedy or Musical**: **Booksmart (TIE)**; **Rocketman (TIE)**; Blinded by the Light; Dolemite Is My Name; Long Shot	**Best Documentary**: **Apollo 11**; American Factory; Hail Satan?; The Kingmaker; Love, Antosha
**Best Horror**: **Us**; Crawl; Doctor Sleep; Midsommar; Ready or Not	**Best Indie Film**: **The Farewell (TIE)**; **Waves (TIE)**; Booksmart; Honey Boy; Luce
**Best International Film**: **Parasite**; Monos; Pain and Glory; Portrait of a Lady on Fire; The Farewell	**Best First Feature**: **Alma Har'el – Honey Boy**; Melina Matsoukas – Queen & Slim; Olivia Wilde – Booksmart; Paul Downs Colaizzo – Brittany Runs a Marathon; Tyler Nilson and Michael Schwartz – The Peanut Butter Falcon
**Best Blockbuster Film**: **Avengers: Endgame**; Captain Marvel; Once Upon a Time in Hollywood; Shazam; Spider-Man: Far From Home	**Best Score**: **Hildur Guðnadóttir – Joker**; Alexandre Desplat – Little Women; Michael Abels – Us; Thomas Newman – 1917; Trent Reznor and Atticus Ross – Waves
**Best Original Song**: **"Glasgow (No Place Like Home)", sung by Jessie Buckley – Wild Rose**; "Catchy Song", sung by Dillion Francis, T-Pain, and That Girl Lay Lay – The Lego Movie 2: The Second Part; "(I'm Gonna) Love Me Again", sung by Elton John and Taron Egerton – Rocketman; "Into the Unknown", sung by Idina Menzel and Aurora – Frozen 2; "Speechless", sung by Naomi Scott – Aladdin	**Best Cinematography**: **Roger Deakins – 1917**; Drew Daniels – Waves; Jarin Blaschke – The Lighthouse; Lawrence Sher – Joker; Robert Richardson – Once Upon a Time in Hollywood
**Best Film Editing**: **Lee Smith – 1917**; Fred Raskin – Once Upon a Time in Hollywood; Jinmo Yang – Parasite; Michael McCusker – Ford v Ferrari; Thelma Schoonmaker – The Irishman	**Best Stunts**: **John Wick: Chapter 3 – Parabellum**; 1917; Avengers: Endgame; Captain Marvel; Hobbs and Shaw
**Best Costume Design**: **Julian Day – Rocketman**; Arianne Phillips – Once Upon a Time in Hollywood; Jacqueline Durran – Little Women; Mark Bridges – Joker; Ruth E. Carter – Dolemite Is My Name	**Best Hair & Makeup**: **Kazu Hiro, Anne Morgan, and Vivian Baker – Bombshell**; Elizabeth Yianni-Georgiou, Tapio Salmi, and Barrie Gower – Rocketman; Jeremy Woodhead – Judy; Nicki Ledermann and Kay Georgiou – Joker; Nicki Ledermann, Sean Flannigan, and Carla White – The Irishman
**Best Visual Effects**: **Dan DeLeeuw, Matt Aitken, Russell Earl, and Dan Sudick – Avengers: Endgame**; Allen Maris, Jedediah Smith, Guillaume Rocheron, and Scott R. Fisher – Ad Astra; Guillaume Rocheron, Greg Butler, and Dominic Tuohy – 1917; Joe Letteri, Eric Saindon, and Nick Epstein – Alita: Battle Angel; Pablo Helman, Leandro Estebecorena, Stephane Grabli, and Nelson Sepulveda – The Irishman	**Next Generation of Hollywood Award**: **Brooklynn Prince**; **Geraldine Viswanathan**; **Jack Dylan Grazer**; **Kaitlyn Dever**; **Kelvin Harrison Jr.**; **Lana Condor**; **Mckenna Grace**; **Millicent Simmonds**; **Noah Jupe**; **Shahadi Wright Joseph**; **Thomasin McKenzie**; **Zoey Deutch**

=== Non-Competition/Honorary awards ===
- **Breakthrough Performance by an Actor – Kelvin Harrison Jr. for Waves**
- **Breakthrough Performance by an Actress – Jessie Buckley for Wild Rose**
- **Inspire Award – Deon Taylor**
- **Actor of the Decade – Adam Driver**
- **Actress of the Decade – Kristen Stewart**
- **Filmmaker of the Decade – Denis Villeneuve**
- **Producer of the Decade – Daniela Taplin Lundberg**
- **Newcomer Award – Zack Gottsagen**
- **Game Changer Award – Paul Walter Hauser**
- **Star on the Rise Award – Taylor Russell**
- **Trailblazer Award – Olivia Wilde**
- **Acting Achievement Award – Anton Yelchin**
- **Artisan Achievement Award – Ruth E. Carter**
- **Filmmaking Achievement Award – Bong Joon-ho**

== Films with multiple wins ==
Wins	Film
4	1917
3	Booksmart
2	Avengers: Endgame
2	Honey Boy
2	Joker
2	Parasite
2	Rocketman
2	Us

== Films with multiple nominations ==
Nominations	Film
12	Once Upon a Time in Hollywood
9	The Irishman
7	1917
7	Booksmart
7	Joker
7	Waves
6	Avengers: Endgame
6	The Farewell
6	Marriage Story
5	Honey Boy
5	Jojo Rabbit
5	Parasite
5	Rocketman
3	Captain Marvel
3	Dolemite Is My Name
3	Hustlers
3	Little Women
3	Us
2	Alita: Battle Angel
2	Bombshell
2	Frozen 2
2	Hobbs & Shaw
2	John Wick: Chapter 3 – Parabellum
2	Judy
2	Knives Out
2	Toy Story 4
