= Fjögur píanó =

Song by Sigur Rós

from the album Valtari
- Recorded: 2011–12
- Genre: Ambient
- Length: 7:50
- Label: Parlophone
- Songwriter(s): Jón Þór Birgisson; Orri Páll Dýrason; Georg Hólm; Kjartan Sveinsson

"Fjögur píanó" is a song by Icelandic band Sigur Rós from their sixth studio album, Valtari. Two official music videos were released. The first, directed by Alma Har'el and starring Shia LaBeouf and Denna Thomsen, premiered on June 18, 2012. The second premiered on 15 October and was directed by Anafelle Liu, Dio Lau and Ken Ngan.

== Music videos ==
Shia LaBeouf in the video for "Fjögur píanó" directed by Alma Har'el

The first music video for the song premiered on June 18, 2012. It was directed by Alma Har'el and stars Shia LaBeouf and Denna Thomsen as "a couple trapped in a perpetual cycle of addiction and abuse, set to a somber piano melody that at times hints at some light at the end of the tunnel."

The video gained millions of views on YouTube, and was widely acclaimed. Filmmaker magazine called it "provocative and dramatically compelling," while Nowness magazine called it "Hypnotic." In an interview with The Wall Street Journal, Har'el said, "For me, it's about not knowing how to get out of something without causing pain to somebody else. For other people it might be about candy and fish. I'm down with that."

The second music video, entitled "Skinned", was released on October 15 and was chosen by the band as the overall winner of the Valtari Film Competition.

=== Background ===
As part of their "Valtari Mystery Film Experiment" series, Sigur Rós contacted twelve filmmakers to each direct a music video for a song of the filmmaker's choice from Sigur Rós' sixth studio album, Valtari. Each filmmaker was presented with a budget of $10,000 and no instruction from the band "to bypass the usual artistic approval process and allow people utmost creative freedom." "Fjögur píanó" is the third instalment in the series. Sigur Rós bassist Georg Hólm said that Har'el's original concept for the video was Sigur Rós "on super 8 in Iceland all playing the piano lines from the song, but then she rang and said she'd met Shia LaBeouf and they'd changed the idea, that was the last [Sigur Rós] heard of the concept and she told [them] nothing about what was going on." Hólm went on to say the finished video was "absolutely amazing." Har'el stated that the music video for "Fjögur píanó" is about "addiction to drugs, or sex, or anything–and how you get stuck in a cycle."

The Wall Street Journal wrote of Har'el's video, "All the directors received the same $10,000 budget and zero instructions from the band. With that creative freedom, filmmaker Alma Har'el delivered dead butterflies, light-up lollipops and a naked (in every sense) performance from a star of megabudget Hollywood movies." In an interview for Vulture magazine, Shia LaBeouf explained his involvement in the project and how he met Har'el, "I wrote a fan letter, I saw Bombay Beach, the movie that Alma Har'el made. It touched me. I told her so. She told me she'd like to work with me. I said, 'What are you doing?' She said, 'I got this Sigur Rós thing.' I said, 'Cool. Can I get involved?' And at the time, it was a different idea. So we worked on the idea for a week."

Promo News wrote that "Shia LeBeouf unquestionably gets back in touch with his art in this raw (in every sense), thought-provoking, and beautiful directed piece." Har'el said in an interview about the video for Filmmaker Magazine, "I suffer a lot when I have no freedom to do what I want because it always turns less than what it can be. But making films is expansive and you have to choose your battles. In this one, we were all on the same side." When asked if she was inspired by relationships, cinematic or otherwise, for the video, Har'el explained, "I was mostly inspired by relationships I know, from seeing how hard it is to get out of something that is both beautiful and deadening. For me, the butterflies symbolize beautiful, perfect things that die fast."
