= Alma Har'el =

Israeli-American film director

- עלמה הראל
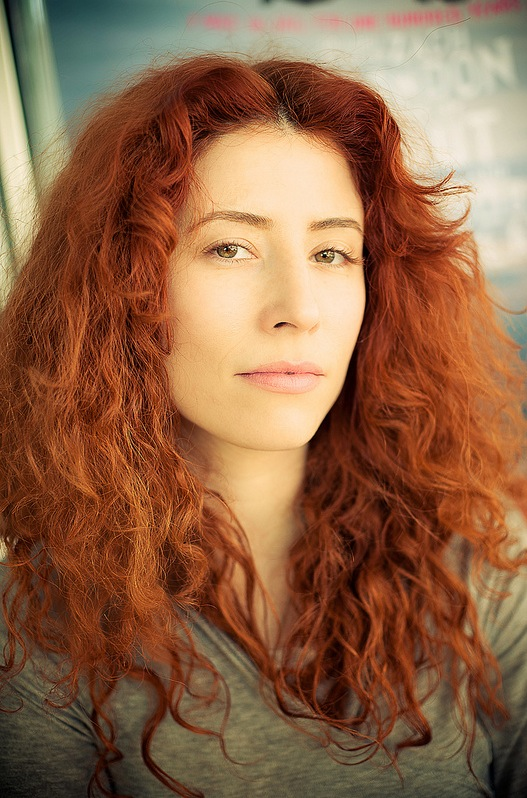
- Har'el in January 2013
- Born: July 2, 1975 (age 51); Tel Aviv, Israel
- Occupation: Director
- Spouse(s): Boaz Yakin (m. 2004; div. 2012)

Alma Har'el (Hebrew: עלמה הראל; born July 2, 1975) is an Israeli-American music video and film director. She is best known for her 2019 feature film debut Honey Boy, for which she won a Directors Guild of America Award.

Her 2011 documentary Bombay Beach, which took the top prize at Tribeca Film Festival, received a nomination for an Independent Spirit Award. In 2016, her documentary LoveTrue won the Grand Prix Best Documentary Award at the Karlovy Vary International Film Festival. The same year, Har'el was named one of the "Top 12 female filmmakers ready to direct a blockbuster" by IndieWire.

Har'el is noted for her ability to artistically blur the lines between documentary and fiction. Stephan Holden of The New York Times wrote about Har'el's film Bombay Beach: "[it] looks and feels like a fever dream about an alternate universe. Suffused with a sense of wonder, it hovers, dancing inside its own ethereal bubble".

== Early life ==
Har'el was born and raised in Tel Aviv, Israel, to a Jewish family, Alma Har'el began her work as a photographer and VJing at live music concerts.

One of Har'el's most prominent projects as a VJ was a collaboration with the Israeli music group Balkan Beat Box, including an 11-minute video, The Balkan Beat Box 1st show ever - Digital Diary of Alma Har'el, on their first album, released in 2005. Har'el later stated that she "never studied film, so that (VJing) was my film school" [ ... ] I wanted to feel as though I was playing videos like a musical instrument — editing them live, with people reacting. That still has a big impact on me to this day."

== Career ==
Working on live video-art performances with different musicians led Har'el to directing music videos, and her frequent collaborations with singer Zach Condon of the band Beirut brought her numerous awards and nominations in film and music video festivals.

Har'el's work on the Beirut music video for their single "Elephant Gun" (2009), earned her nominations for Best Directorial Debut at the MTV Video Music Awards and the Music Video Production Association Awards, and was number 30 on Paste's Top 50 Videos of the Decade.

Har'el directed Shia LaBeouf and dancer Denna Thomsen in the music video for Sigur Rós' 2012 song "Fjögur píanó", from the album Valtari. The video was part of the Valtari Mystery Film Experiment, in which Sigur Rós asked a dozen filmmakers to each select a song from the album and shoot a video inspired by the music. The Wall Street Journal explained that "All the directors received the same $10,000 budget and zero instructions from the band. With that creative freedom, filmmaker Alma Har'el delivered dead butterflies, light-up lollipops and a naked (in every sense) performance from a star of megabudget Hollywood movies." Har'el's video received over 4.7 million (as of July 2019) views on YouTube and critical acclaim.

LaBeouf, explaining his involvement in the project, stated that he wrote Har'el a fan letter after being deeply touched by Bombay Beach, to which Har'el responded that she would like to work with him. The two would collaborate again, with LaBeouf producing her 2016 documentary LoveTrue, and Har'el directing LaBeouf's 2019 autobiographical drama film Honey Boy (the latter of which being Har'el's narrative feature directorial debut).

In July 2011, Har'el was chosen as one of Filmmaker's 25 New Faces of Cinema, which also noted in October 2011 that her film Bombay Beach was "Stunningly shot and formally audacious... (from) a major new directorial talent in Har'el who is working in a key all her own."

From 2014 to 2016, Har'el was the Global Creative Director at immersive media company RYOT.

=== Bombay Beach ===
Bombay Beach is a 2011 feature film about the rusting relic of a failed 1950s development boom. The Salton Sea, a prominent character in the film, is a barren Californian landscape often seen as a symbol of the failure of the American Dream.

Har'el was joined by Zach Condon of the band Beirut, whom she worked with on music videos earlier in her career, to prepare the music for the film.

=== LoveTrue ===
LoveTrue is a 2016 genre-bending documentary that brings Har'el's signature poetic imagery and fascination with performance in nonfiction to three complementary stories about love. The film had its world premiere at the 2016 Tribeca Film Festival, where it had multiple sold-out screenings and received positive reviews.

LoveTrue won best documentary feature at the 2016 Crested Butte Film Festival and the Grand Prix Best Documentary Award at the 2016 Karlovy Vary International Film Festival.^{[4]}

=== Commercials ===
Har'el has shot and directed commercials for tech companies, including Airbnb's first campaign, for which she won the 2014 Clio Award for Best Cinematography and the 2015 Wood Pencil Award for Best Cinematography.

Har'el also directed the first ad campaign for Internet.org, Mark Zuckerberg's initiative to bring Internet access to technologically challenged areas of the world. Spots were shot in India, Indonesia and Bolivia, among other countries. She was also the first female filmmaker to direct a commercial for Stella Artois with 2016's ad "Isabella", which was shot by cinematographer Benoît Debie. In 2013 she joined commercial ad agency Epoch Films.

In 2017, Har'el directed a short film for Chanel called "Jellywolf" which stars Kiersey Clemons and Lisa Bonet. The 8-minute film is set in "a magical futuristic version of downtown LA brought to life with beguiling special effects". Clemons sets out on a journey to discover her mythical spirit animal "JellyWolf" with the help of Bonet's shamanic beauty parlor owner. Indiewire commented saying "Jellywolf" was "A wildly inventive short feminist sci-fi!"

=== Free the Bid ===
In 2016, Har'el founded Free the Bid, an initiative designed to fight gender bias in the advertisement industry. It calls for ad agencies to include at least one female director every time they triple-bid a commercial production. The program also urges production companies to add more women to their rosters. If ad agencies can't find a woman candidate fit for the job, they must then pledge to free this bid by seeking other forms of diversity for the project. The initiative has garnered support by leading ad agencies around the world such as FCB, DDB, BBDO, McCann, JWT and Leo Burnett to hot shops like Pereira & O'Dell, Mother, 72&Sunny, Martin and 180, and in November 2016, Har'el received the "Female 3 Cheers Award" at the third annual 3% Movement Conference, a similar themed organization trying to expand the number of creative directors beyond 3%, for Free the Bid's impact on gender equality in advertising.

=== Honey Boy ===
Har'el made her narrative feature film debut with Honey Boy (2019), written by and starring Shia LaBeouf in a semi-autobiographical story about his upbringing. In an interview with FF2 Media, Har'el cited the challenges of filming something so closely linked to PTSD as well as the captivating pull of the script that convinced her to take on the project. For her work on the film, Har'el won the Directors Guild of America Award for Outstanding Directing – First-Time Feature Film. In total, Honey Boy received 34 nominations and 9 wins from various associations and festivals. More recently, she signed a first look deal with Amazon Studios to develop TV projects.

=== Shadow Kingdom ===
Har'el directed Shadow Kingdom: The Early Songs of Bob Dylan, a Bob Dylan concert film, which debuted on Veeps.com on July 18, 2021. The film earned rave reviews for its "stunning" visuals and Har'el referred to it as her "most cherished work" in an Instagram post six days after the premiere.

=== TIME: Woman of the Year ===
In 2020, Time announced the "100 Women of the Year" project and special issue, conceived by Har'el, which launched for International Women's Day 2020. The project recognized the contributions of female leaders, innovators, activists, entertainers, athletes and artists who defined the century from 1920 through 2019. A scripted anthology series based Women of the Year is currently in the works at Amazon MGM Studios.

=== Lady in the Lake ===
In 2024, Alma created, wrote and directed Lady in the Lake, a miniseries based on the novel by Laura Lippman. The show takes place in 1960s Baltimore, as an investigative journalist leaves her husband and Pikesville home to pursue a career as a newspaper reporter. She becomes obsessed with unraveling the mystery of two separate killings: eleven-year-old Tessie Durst and a bartender named Cleo Sherwood.

Lady in the Lake stars Natalie Portman and Moses Ingram with Byron Bowers, Noah Jupe, Dylan Arnold, Y'lan Noel, Mikey Madison and Brett Gelman in supporting roles. Har'el directed all episodes of the series, which premiered July 19, 2024 on Apple TV+.

== Personal life ==
She was married to American director Boaz Yakin between the years of 2004–2012. Since 2015 Har'el has been in a relationship with American actor and comedian Byron Bowers, and gave birth to her first child during the production of Lady in the Lake.

== Music videos ==
- Muki - "Won't Stop Dreaming" (2006)
- Taylor Hawkins and the Coattail Riders - "Louise" (2007)
- Beirut - "Elephant Gun" (2007)
- Beirut - "Postcards from Italy" (2008)
- Bajofondo - "Pa' Bailar" (2008)
- Nikka Costa - "Stuck to You" (2008)
- The Rolling Stones (Soulwax remix) - "You Can't Always Get What You Want" (2009)
- Jack Peñate - "Tonight's Today" (2009)
- Beirut - "Concubine" (2009)
- Fanfarlo - "Harold T. Wilkins" (2009)
- We Are the World - "Clay Stones" (2009)
- Shearwater - "Hidden Lakes" (2010)
- Sigur Rós - "Fjögur píanó" (2012)

== Commercials (List) ==
- Airbnb - "Birdhouses" (2013)
- Airbnb - "Views" (2013)
- Internet.org (2015)
- Stella Artois - "Isabella" (2016)

== Awards and accolades ==
Beirut - "Elephant Gun" (2007)

- MTV Video Music Awards: nominated for Best Debut Director

Jack Peñate - "Tonight's Today" (2009)

- UK Music Video Awards: nominated for Best Indy Rock Video
- Camerimage Film Festival: nominated for Best Music Video

Bombay Beach (2011)

- Tribeca Festival Winner for Best World Documentary
- Independent Spirit: nominated for "Truer than Fiction" award
- Guanajuato International Film Festival Winner for Best World Documentary
- Woodstock Film Festival Winner for Best Editing
- Sheffield DocFest: Honorable Mention, and Special Jury Award
- Camden International Film Festival Winner for Emerging Cinematic Vision
- Filmmaker's 25 New Faces of Cinema 2011
- Cinema Eye Honors (2012): nominated for Best Film Debut and Best Cinematography
- Paste (2012): "The 20 Best Uses of Bob Dylan Songs in Film"

Airbnb "Views" (2014)

- Clio Awards Winner for Best Cinematography
- Wood Pencil (2015): Winner for Best Cinematography

LoveTrue (2016)

- Crested Butte Film Festival Winner for Best Documentary Feature
- Karlovy Vary International Film Festival Winner for Best Documentary

IndieWire (2016): Top 12 Female Filmmakers Ready to Direct a Blockbuster
