= Free the Bid =

Nonprofit initiative

Free the Bid is a 501c3 non-profit initiative advocating on behalf of women directors for equal opportunities to bid on commercial jobs in the global advertising industry. Free the Bid's pledge calls for ad agencies and brands to include at least one woman director every time they triple-bid a commercial production. The program also urges production companies to add more women to their rosters. Pledged agencies, brands and production companies further pledge to free the bid by seeking intersectional, diverse perspectives whenever possible.

The initiative was launched in 2016 by award-winning filmmaker Alma Har'el.

== About ==
Har'el decided to launch the initiative after giving an interview at Mashable about the shockingly low number of female-helmed commercials. In the interview, Har'el stated, "Less than 7% of directors are women and less than 10% of creative directors at ad agencies are women. These numbers are hard to swallow for 50% of the world's population, especially when the Harvard Business Review and many other publications suggest that women are the #1 consumer group that makes approximately 85% of product purchase decisions."

Inspired by Har'el's Mashable interview, PJ Pereira, CCO and co-founder of Pereira & O'Dell agency announced that he would be pursuing a mandatory bid from a woman director on every pitch at his agency. Pereira explained, "It's a simple idea that will help the entire advertising ecosystem be more open to women directors. Because it's right but also because it's smart. A more diverse industry means a more creative one and a better representation of their customers and of society itself."

Har'el decided to use this idea to inspire more ad agencies, production companies and brands to take the pledge to have a woman director bid on every commercial. Har'el named the initiative #FreeTheBid and launched it in September 2016 with an extensive website and the backing of prominent industry figures within the gender diversity discussion, including renowned feminist and advertising consultant Cindy Gallop.

With early support from large networks such as FCB, DDB, BBDO, McCann, JWT and Leo Burnett to hot shops like Pereira & O'Dell, Mother, 72&Sunny, Martin and 180, the initiative quickly received widespread exposure in the media.

One of the first brands to take a global pledge to seek a woman director on every job they produced around the world was HP. Antonio Lucio, Global CMO HP Inc. explained, "HP takes the pledge to #FREETHEBID globally. We believe the creative process of our ad agencies will be strengthened and we're excited to implement this pledge globally and give women a voice in advertising to the benefit of everyone, everywhere. We hope to inspire more brands to join us in this pledge and #FREETHEBID."

Another early supporter of the initiative is award winning film and commercial director Spike Jonze, who stated in an interview, "I find #FreeTheBid so inspiring. It seems like a no brainer. Of course we should be getting more women filmmakers to bid on jobs. As with all great ideas, its such a simple one and the end result is going to be get- ting more diverse voices into the conversation and therefore more diverse voices into the work which makes the work better."

Free the Bid's website currently features a database of over 400 women directors from all over the world, including links to their reels and producers. The database is designed to help the pledged agencies keep their commitment to the cause and is searchable by keyword, category tags, and location, allowing visitors to easily discover the work of a woman best suited for any job.

== Industry feedback ==
In October 2016, advertising magazine SHOOT Online followed up with female directors to see how they felt about the initiative. In the article, director Molly Schiot states that #FreeTheBid is "the most important step that has been made in my career as a director. Opportunity creates a larger possibility of landing a job for myself and my female peers. Which means they will get a decent budget. Which means their reels will get better. Which means that things will be fairer. Which means agencies can start talking about the quality of ones work with a pronoun that isn't just he, his, or him."

McCann Worldgroup Global Creative Chairman Rob Reilly reported the initiative is already in play at the agency's New York office. "This wasn't forced by me, but everyone got behind it and said it's the right thing to do," he said. "Sometimes bills and laws get written and redone and they come up with a new law that's even better, but someone has to write that first bill for change to happen. The big agencies need to be part of this effort, and the best thing that can happen is that there aren't enough viable female directors, and then it forces production companies to look at more female talent."

EBay CMO Suzy Deering was one of the first adopters of the program and reported the company has already implemented the initiative into its current work, and that, "moving forward, [we] will update our agency partners' scopes of work," she said. "The cycle must be broken. Given our diverse community of buyers and sellers around the world, this is an important cause for eBay to stand for."

FCB Chicago reported that prior to joining Free the Bid, roughly 40% of its bids included a female director. Six months in, 95% of bids now include a woman. Before, women directors actually landed about 10% of all its bids. Now that number has jumped to 30%.

HP has been an avid benefactor as the effort has dovetailed with the company's own stated commitment to promote diversity. The company's financial support has helped Free the Bid to bring in an executive director, Emma Reeves, and expand the portfolio of female directors' reels on its website to more than 400 from 70 at the start. A recent HP campaign, "Reinvent My Story," brought in director Peyton Wilson and Free the Bid writers. During 2017 Cannes film festival, the brand said it would be stepping into the film business for the first time with a female director, Nandita Das, on the biopic "Manto."

Brands like Visa, Coca-Cola and Nestle Waters have pledged to free the bid.

== Awards ==
In November 2016, Har'el received the "3 Cheers Award" from the 3% Conference in New York City for Free the Bid's impact on gender equality in advertising.
