= Directors Guild of America Award for Outstanding Directorial Achievement in First-Time Theatrical Feature Film =

Annual award for film directing

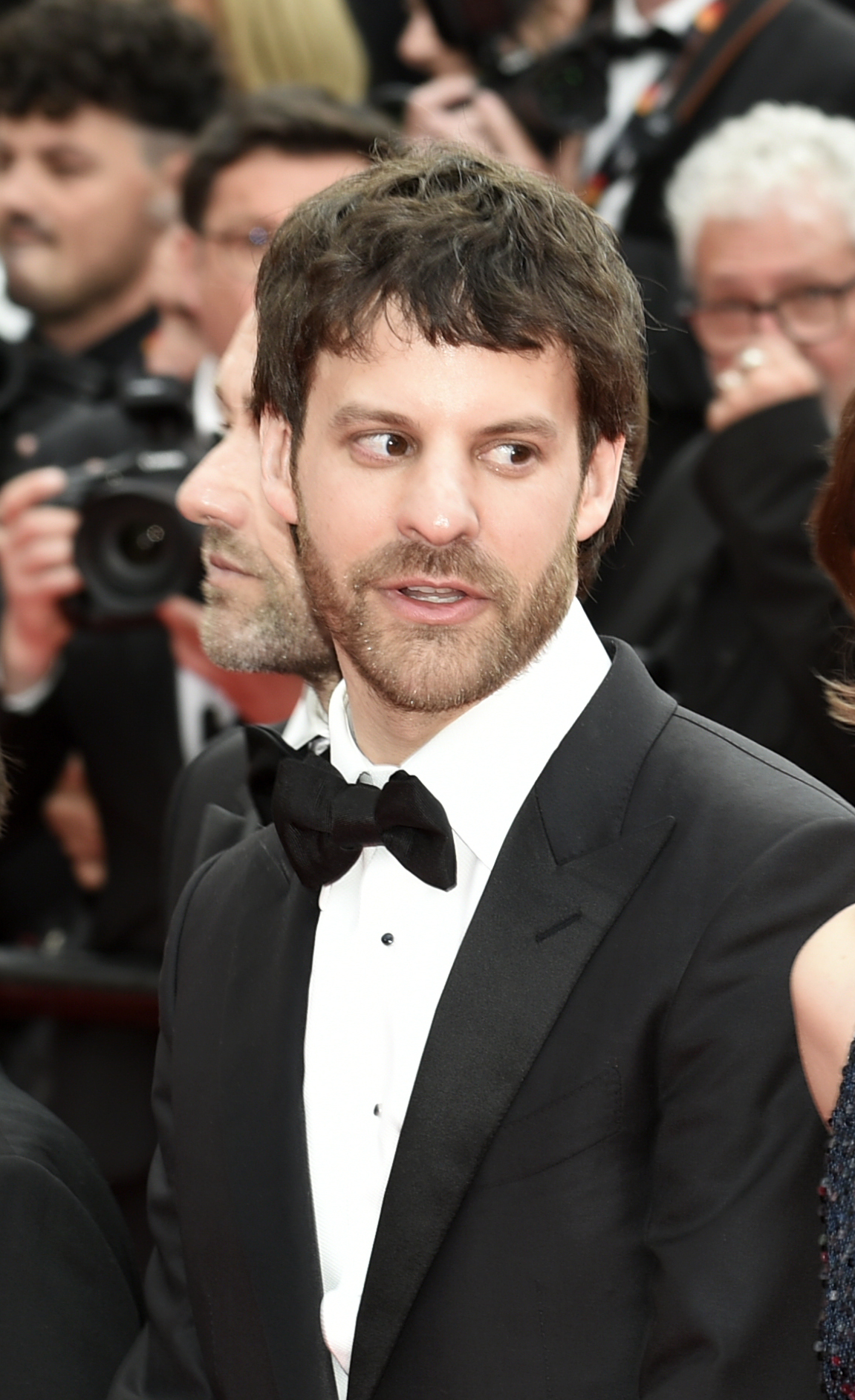
- The 2025 recipient: Charlie Polinger
- Awarded for: Outstanding Directorial Achievement in First-Time Theatrical Feature Film
- Country: United States
- Presented by: Directors Guild of America
- First award: 2015
- Currently held by: Charlie Polinger for The Plague (2025)
- Website: https://www.dga.org

The Michael Apted Award for Outstanding Directorial Achievement in First-Time Theatrical Feature Film is one of the annual Directors Guild of America Awards given by the Directors Guild of America (DGA). It was first awarded at the 68th Directors Guild of America Awards. The award was called the Directors Guild of America Award for Outstanding Directorial Achievement of a First-Time Feature Film Director until 2023, when it was renamed in honor of director and former DGA president Michael Apted, who created the award.

== Winners and nominees ==
- † – indicates a nomination for the Academy Award for Best Director.
- ‡ – indicates a nomination for the DGA Award for Outstanding Directing.

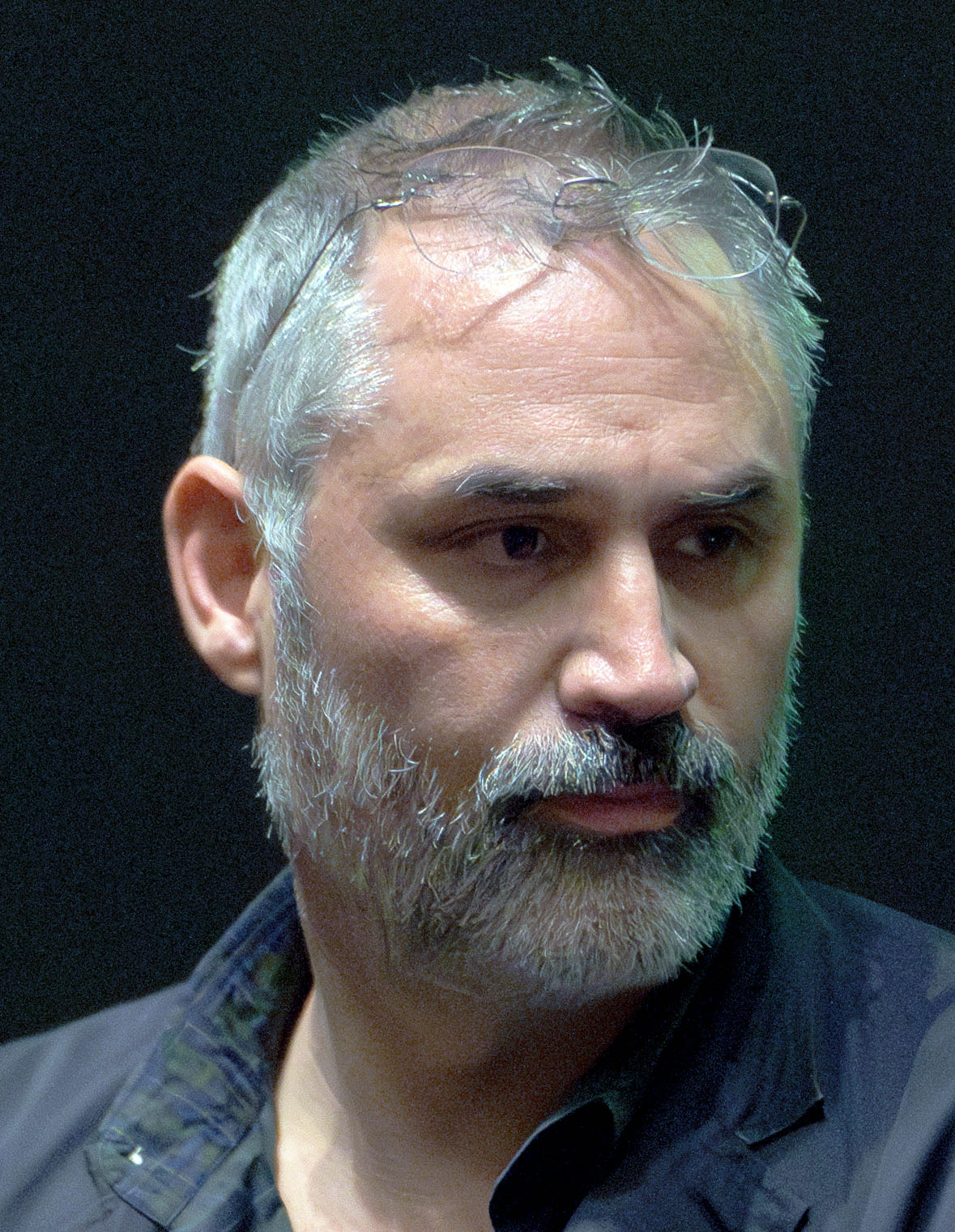
English filmmaker Alex Garland won the inaugural award for Ex Machina (2015).

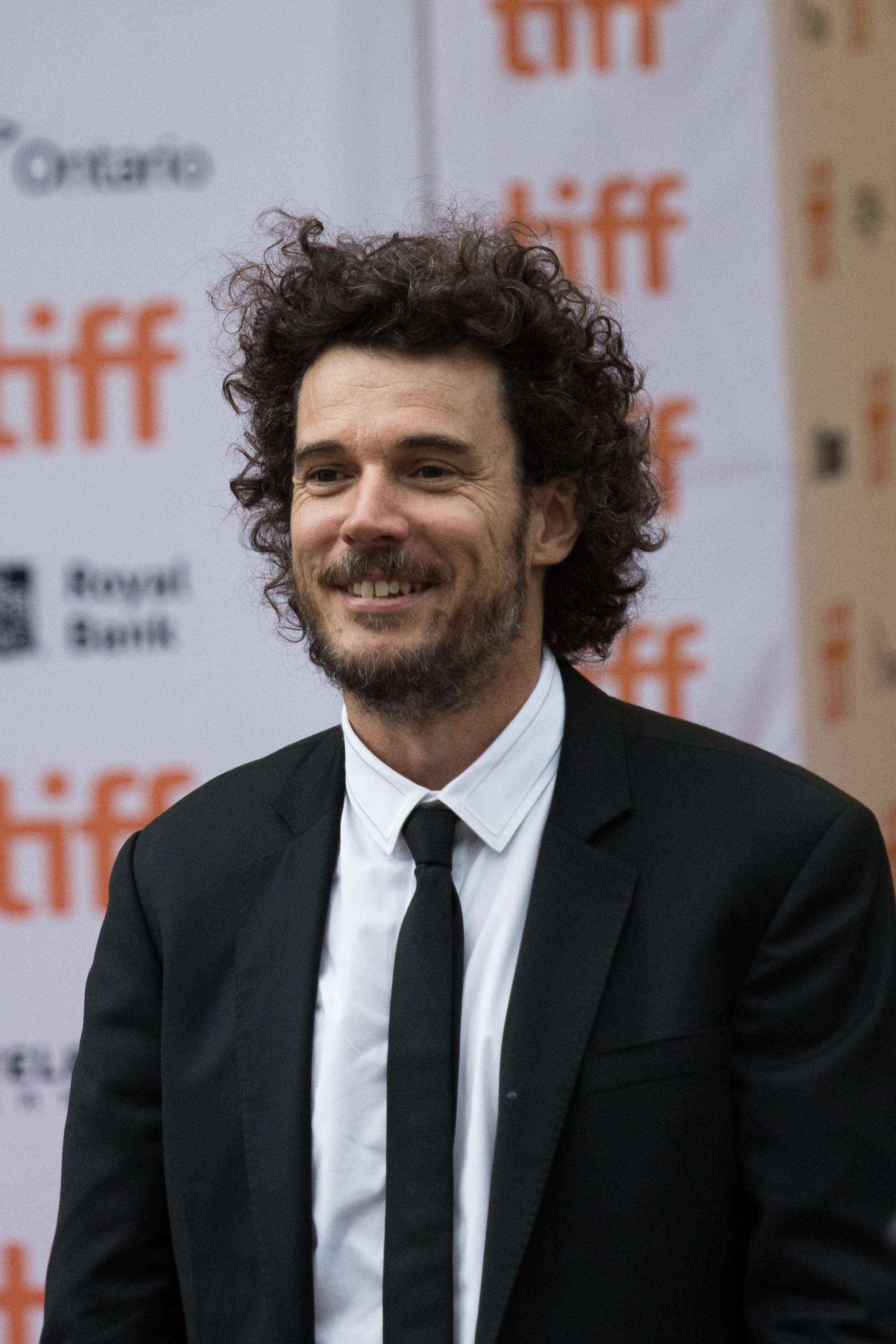
Austrralian filmmaker Garth Davis won for Lion (2016).

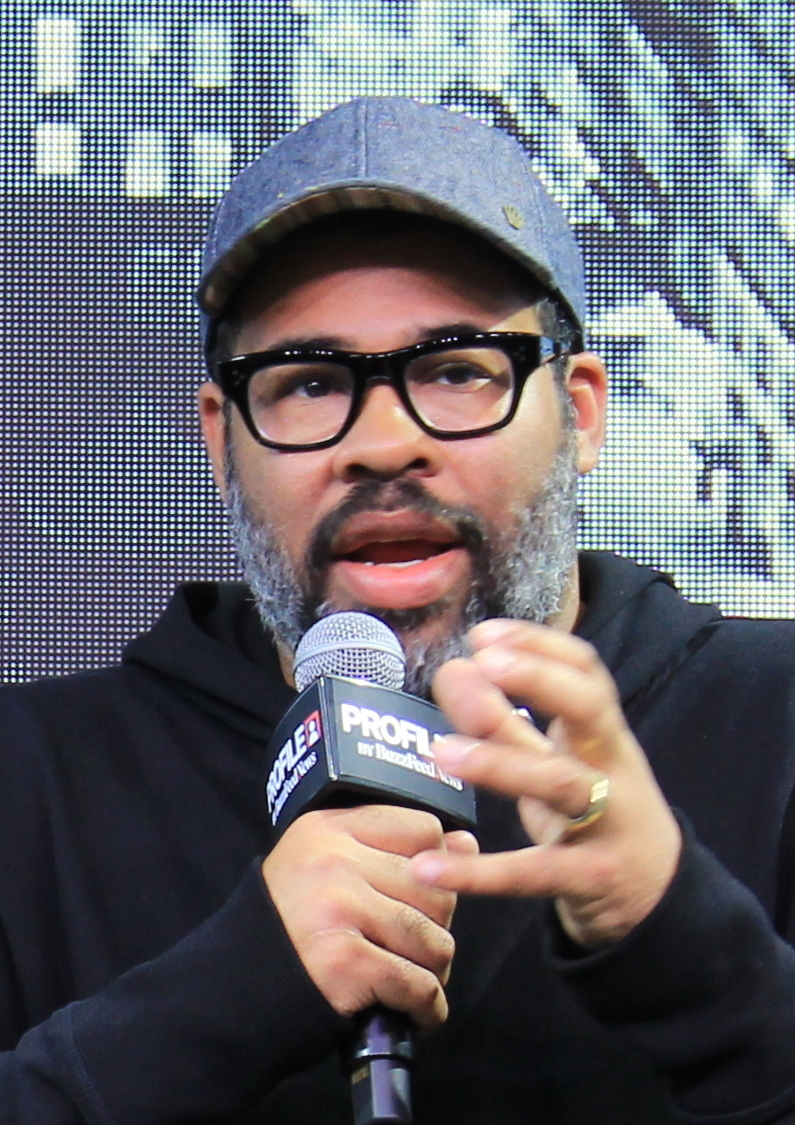
American filmmaker Jordan Peele won for Get Out (2017).

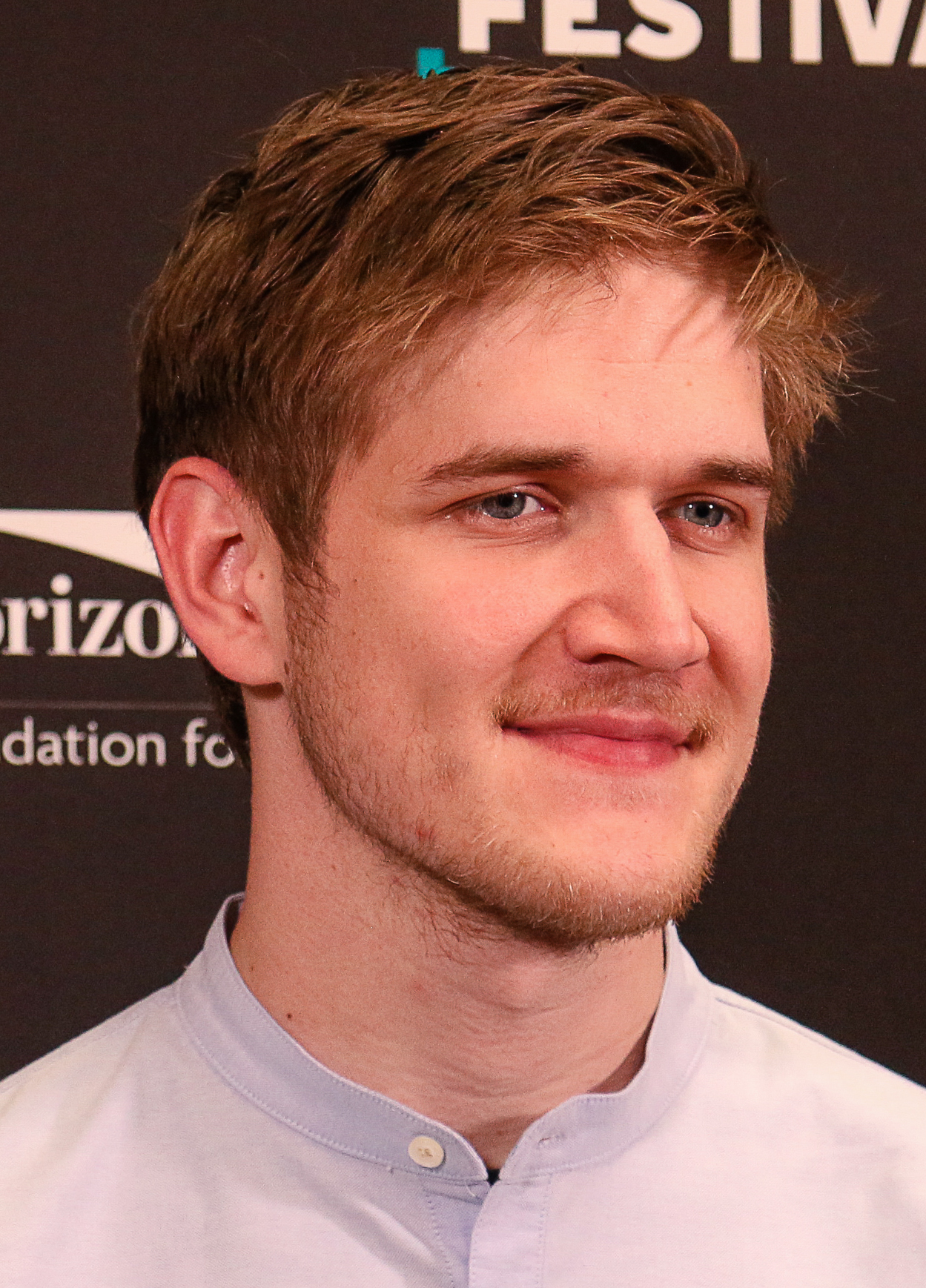
American filmmaker Bo Burnham won for Eighth Grade (2018).

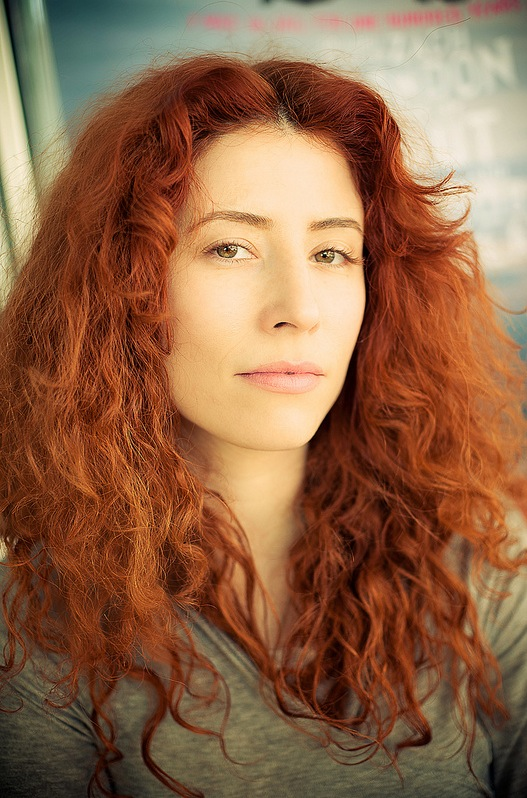
Israeli filmmaker Alma Har'el won for Honey Boy (2019).

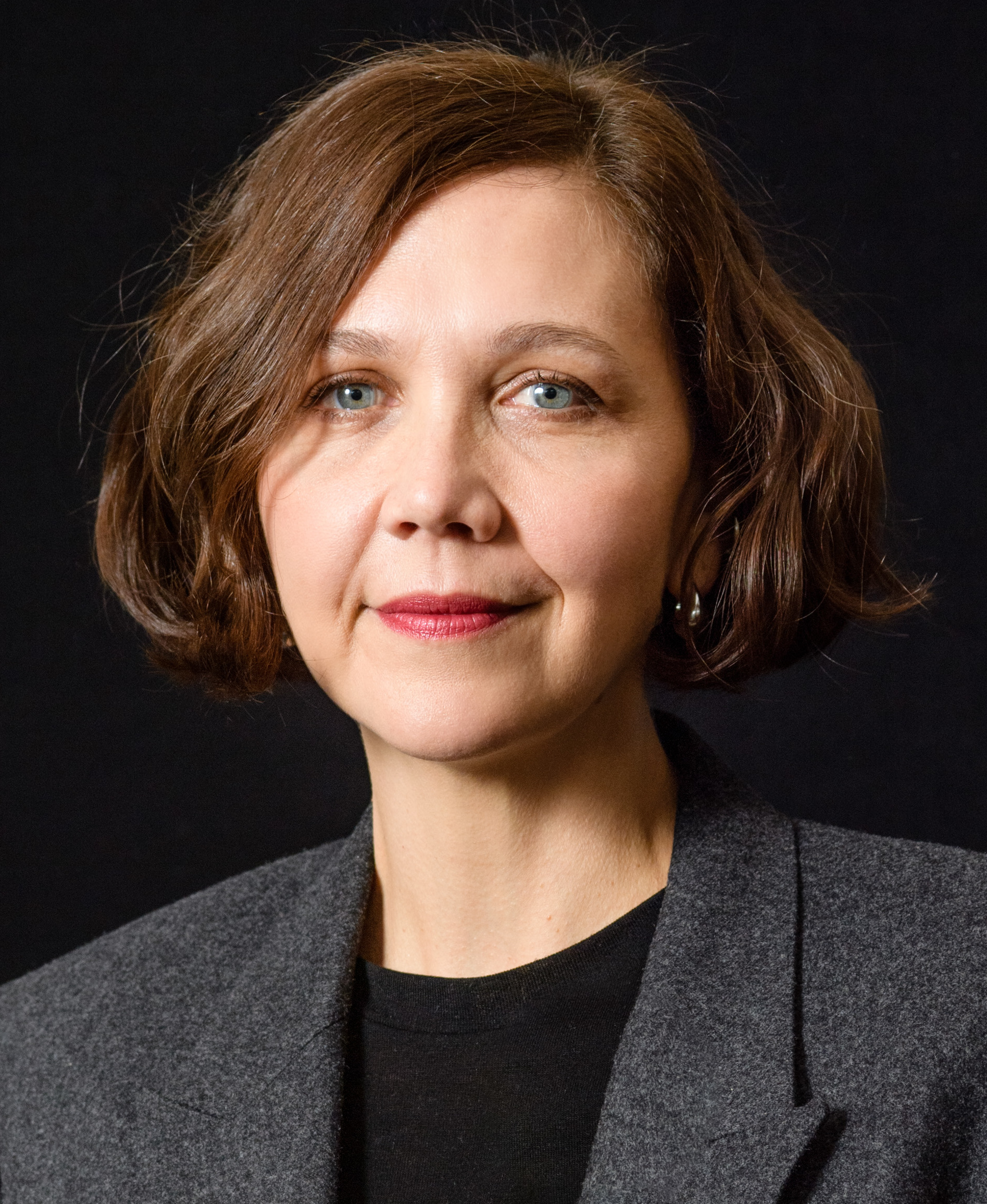
American filmmaker Maggie Gyllenhaal won for The Lost Daughter (2021).

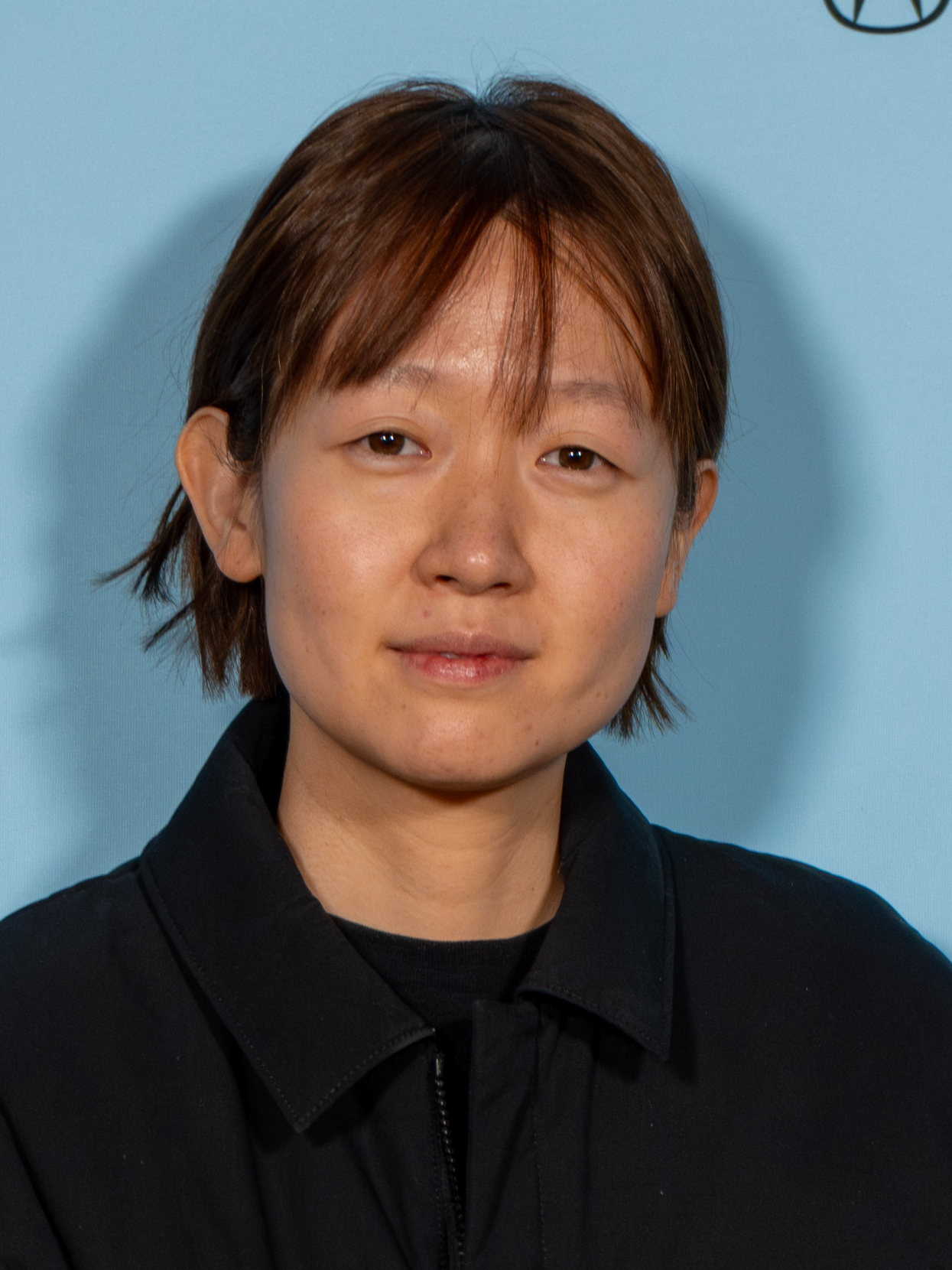
Canadian filmmaker Celine Song won for Past Lives (2023).

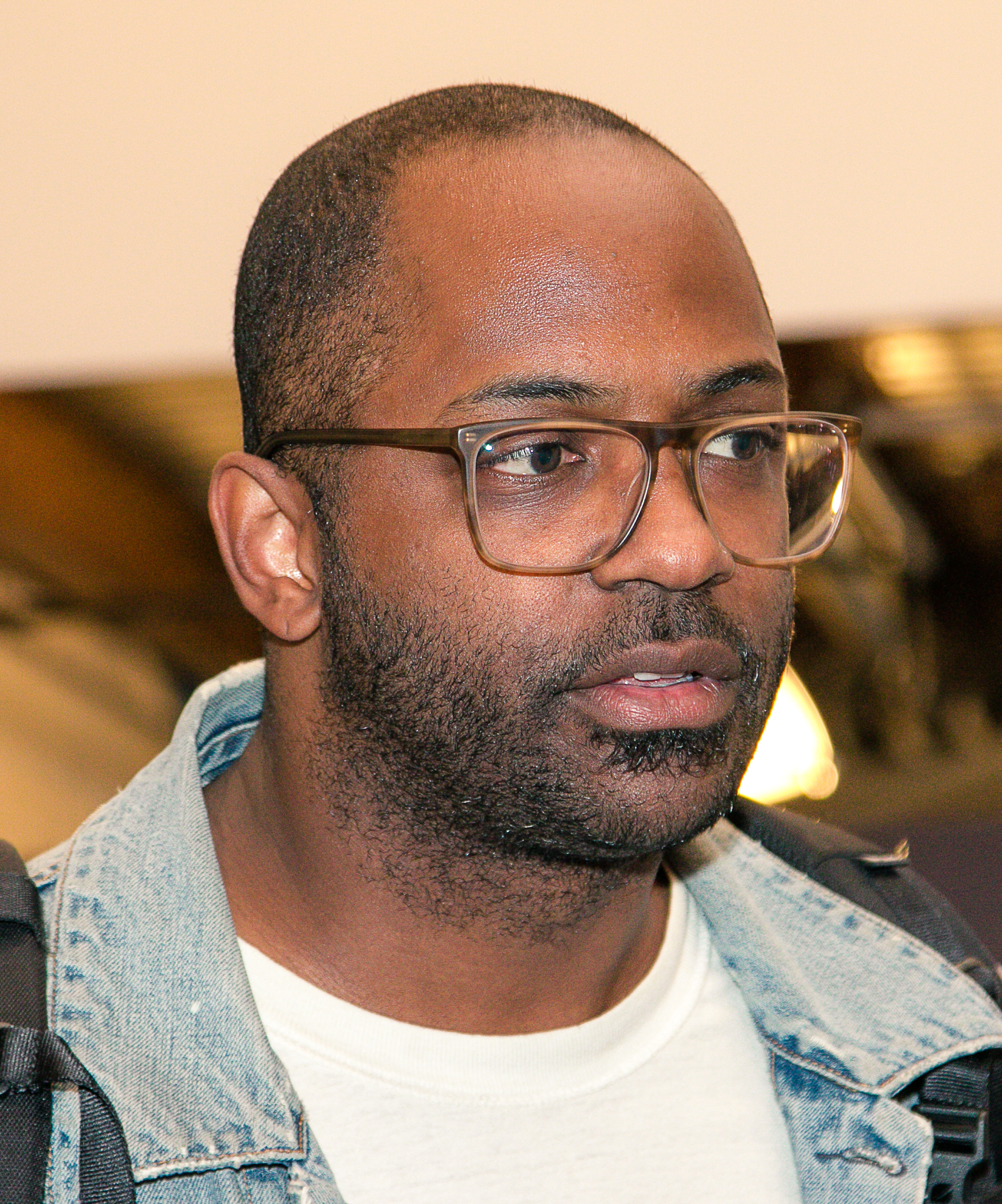
American filmmaker RaMell Ross won for Nickel Boys (2024).

=== 2010s ===
Year	Winners and nominees	Film	Ref.
2015 (68th)	Alex Garland	Ex Machina	
2015 (68th)	Fernando Coimbra	A Wolf at the Door	
2015 (68th)	Joel Edgerton	The Gift	
2015 (68th)	Marielle Heller	The Diary of a Teenage Girl	
2015 (68th)	László Nemes	Son of Saul	
2016 (69th)	Garth Davis ‡	Lion	
2016 (69th)	Kelly Fremon Craig	The Edge of Seventeen	
2016 (69th)	Tim Miller	Deadpool	
2016 (69th)	Nate Parker	The Birth of a Nation	
2016 (69th)	Dan Trachtenberg	10 Cloverfield Lane	
2017 (70th)	Jordan Peele † ‡	Get Out	
2017 (70th)	Geremy Jasper	Patti Cake$	
2017 (70th)	William Oldroyd	Lady Macbeth	
2017 (70th)	Taylor Sheridan	Wind River	
2017 (70th)	Aaron Sorkin	Molly's Game	
2018 (71st)	Bo Burnham	Eighth Grade	
2018 (71st)	Bradley Cooper ‡	A Star Is Born	
2018 (71st)	Carlos López Estrada	Blindspotting	
2018 (71st)	Matthew Heineman	A Private War	
2018 (71st)	Boots Riley	Sorry to Bother You	
2019 (72nd)	Alma Har'el	Honey Boy	
2019 (72nd)	Mati Diop	Atlantics	
2019 (72nd)	Melina Matsoukas	Queen & Slim	
2019 (72nd)	Tyler Nilson and Michael Schwartz	The Peanut Butter Falcon	
2019 (72nd)	Joe Talbot	The Last Black Man in San Francisco	

=== 2020s ===
Year	Winners and nominees	Film	Ref.
2020 (73rd)	Darius Marder	Sound of Metal	
2020 (73rd)	Radha Blank	The 40-Year-Old Version	
2020 (73rd)	Fernando Frías de la Parra	I'm No Longer Here	
2020 (73rd)	Regina King	One Night in Miami...	
2020 (73rd)	Florian Zeller	The Father	
2021 (74th)	Maggie Gyllenhaal	The Lost Daughter	
2021 (74th)	Rebecca Hall	Passing	
2021 (74th)	Tatiana Huezo	Prayers for the Stolen	
2021 (74th)	Lin-Manuel Miranda	Tick, Tick... Boom!	
2021 (74th)	Michael Sarnoski	Pig	
2021 (74th)	Emma Seligman	Shiva Baby	
2022 (75th)	Charlotte Wells	Aftersun	
2022 (75th)	Alice Diop	Saint Omer	
2022 (75th)	Audrey Diwan	Happening	
2022 (75th)	John Patton Ford	Emily the Criminal	
2022 (75th)	Antoneta Alamat Kusijanović	Murina	
2023 (76th)	Celine Song	Past Lives	
2023 (76th)	Cord Jefferson	American Fiction	
2023 (76th)	Manuela Martelli	Chile '76	
2023 (76th)	Noora Niasari	Shayda	
2023 (76th)	A. V. Rockwell	A Thousand and One	
2024 (77th)	RaMell Ross	Nickel Boys	
2024 (77th)	Payal Kapadia	All We Imagine as Light	
2024 (77th)	Megan Park	My Old Ass	
2024 (77th)	Halfdan Ullmann Tøndel	Armand	
2024 (77th)	Sean Wang	Dìdi	
2025 (78th)	Charlie Polinger	The Plague	
2025 (78th)	Hasan Hadi	The President's Cake	
2025 (78th)	Harry Lighton	Pillion	
2025 (78th)	Alex Russell	Lurker	
2025 (78th)	Eva Victor	Sorry, Baby	
