= Death in Love =

- Theatrical release poster
- Directed by: Boaz Yakin
- Written by: Boaz Yakin
- Produced by: Alma Har'el; Josh Lucas; Boaz Yakin; Joseph Zolfo
- Starring: Jacqueline Bisset; Adam Brody; Josh Lucas; Lukas Haas
- Cinematography: Frederik Jacobi
- Edited by: John F. Lyons
- Music by: Lesley Barber
- Distributed by: Screen Media Films
- Release dates: January 22, 2008 (Sundance Film Festival); July 17, 2009 (United States)
- Running time: 100 minutes
- Countries: United States; France; Germany
- Languages: English; French; German

Death in Love is a 2008 psychological erotic thriller about a love affair between a Jewish woman and a doctor overseeing human experimentation at a Nazi German concentration camp, and the impact this has on her sons' lives in the 1990s. The film, which was written and directed by Boaz Yakin, debuted in 2008.

The film received a limited theatrical release in the United States on July 17, 2009. It was released on DVD in the United States on January 10, 2010.

== Plot ==
In 1940s Nazi Germany, a young Jewish woman in a Nazi concentration camp saves her own life by seducing the young doctor who performs medical experiments on prisoners. Decades later in the year 1993, that same woman (Jacqueline Bisset) is living in New York City and married with two grown sons.

The two siblings have developed differently under a mother with a long history of erratic behavior. The neurotic younger son (Lukas Haas) can't cope at all, for he still lives at home with his mother and father and is locked in a compulsive, co-dependent relationship with the mother. The older son (Josh Lucas) copes too well. The eldest son is 40 years old, he hides out from the world in erotic escapades with various women, and has a job at a fraudulent modeling agency and acting agency scamming the young and hopeful. He is good at them both... too good but he grows increasingly frightened as his sexual prowess and intellectual diatribes no longer make him feel better.

== Cast ==
Main

- Josh Lucas as Eldest Son
- Jacqueline Bisset as The Mother
- Lukas Haas as Youngest Son
- Adam Brody as The Talent Agent

Supporting

- Morena Baccarin as The Eldest Son's Girlfriend
- Emma Bell as The Young Girl
- Jean Brassard as Young Girl's Father
- Fabrizia Dal Farra as Concentration Camp Woman
- Francis Dumaurier as Old Lawyer
- Seth Fisher as Hotel Receptionist
- Kelli Giddish as Young Mother
- Betty Gilpin as Young Model
- Laura Holloway as Woman #1
- Grace Nassar as Woman #2
- Jamie Hurley as Woman Tending Child
- Vanessa Kai as Asian Woman
- Jacqueline Margolis as The Widow
- Elizabeth Newman as The Waitress
- Rich Odell as Agent
- Jeanne Omlor as Young Girl's Mother
- Stu Richel as The Father
- Nicholas Sireci as Young Brother
- Matt Walton as Young Father
- Carrington Vilmont as The Doctor

== Production ==
The film was self-financed by its director Boaz Yakin. Yakin explained "This movie came out of a meeting with a studio...What they wanted to do and what I wanted to do were so far apart, I didn't feel I could continue. So I wrote this for a low-budget production. I ended up financing it with my life savings. No one else chipped in a cent. It's not the kind of thing I can afford to do often. But for this one time, I got to express what I wanted to in a way I found interesting. I feel I got to explore and try some things."

Yakin also described the role that the Holocaust plays in the film "For me, the Holocaust part and what it represents is specific. I saw it as a symbol for a certain kind of pain and violence that people keep inside and end up passing on from generation to generation. I saw it as more about love and its destructive power. The Holocaust is a metaphor for this recurring cycle of pain."

Jacqueline Bisset, who plays the mother, says: "Boaz asked me to play the role of the mother in the film as if she were a wild animal, and in other scenes to play her as moonstruck. This combination is one of the things about the film that captivated me."

It was filmed in 25 days in New York City.

== Release ==
The film first premiered at the Sundance Film Festival in January 2008. In 2008, it was also screened at the Boston Film Festival. The film was screened in Israel on 22 December 2008. This January, the film will be screened at the Atlanta Jewish Film festival. The film is scheduled for a theatrical release in July 2009 and will be distributed by Screen Media films. The film was released theatrically in New York City and Los Angeles on 17 July 2009.

== Reception ==
=== Critical response ===
The film was selected for the Sundance Film Festival Premieres category in 2008.

As of June 2020, the film holds a 45% approval rating on Rotten Tomatoes, based on 20 reviews with an average rating of 4.74 out of 10. The website's critics consensus reads: "Death in Love has the depth of its convictions, but not even the game efforts of a talented cast are enough to overcome this drama's stilted story and unlikable characters."

The film was given a rave review by The Hollywood Reporter, describing it as a "stirring glimpse of the ongoing emotional ordeal of a Jewish family..."Death in Love" pierces the senses." The acting performances were also praised, "the strong performances draw us in...Bisset is powerful as a mother who has virtually devoured her young. With her Medusa-like tresses aswirl, she is truly ferocious. As the eldest son, Lucas oozes charm, not only to attract but to repel...Haas is aptly haunting as the younger brother." Technical contributions were described as "functional and vital", with Lesley Barber's score highlighted as "richly tempestuous".

The film was favourably reviewed by Screen Daily " the feel of an Ingmar Bergman family story, although the pain in this Jewish family in New York is more spoken than unspoken, as in one of Woody Allen's efforts at transplanting Bergman to Manhattan (Interiors, parts of Hannah and Her Sisters). The austere interiors of Dara Wishingrad's production design are made even colder by cinematographer Frederick Jacobi's camera." They also made comparisons with Portnoy's Complaint for its sexual nature and with David Mamet's Glengarry Glen Ross for its depiction of a confidence game.

The film was praised by Gary Goldstein of the Los Angeles Times "Yakin and his intrepid cast pull no punches portraying the film's many carnal encounters, filling the movie with a host of startling and powerful images." Goldstein continued to describe the film as "always riveting" and "one endurance test that's worth the effort." The New York Times was less favourable; ""Death in Love" burrows so deeply into the unconscious minds of its depressed New Yorkers that the movie seems to be mumbling to itself in a dream state, driven more by hazy Freudian logic than ordinary cause and effect. The words it murmurs are a litany of endless, futile self-recrimination."

=== Awards ===
Boston Film Festival

- Best Actress - Jacqueline Bisset (won)
- Best Director - Boaz Yakin (won)

Jerusalem Film Festival

- Lia Van Leer award - (nominated)

Ibiza International Film Festival

- (Falco d'Or) Best Script - Boaz Yakin (won)
- Best Actor - Josh Lucas (won)
- Best Actress - Jacqueline Bisset (won)
