= Byron Bowers =

American comedian, writer and actor

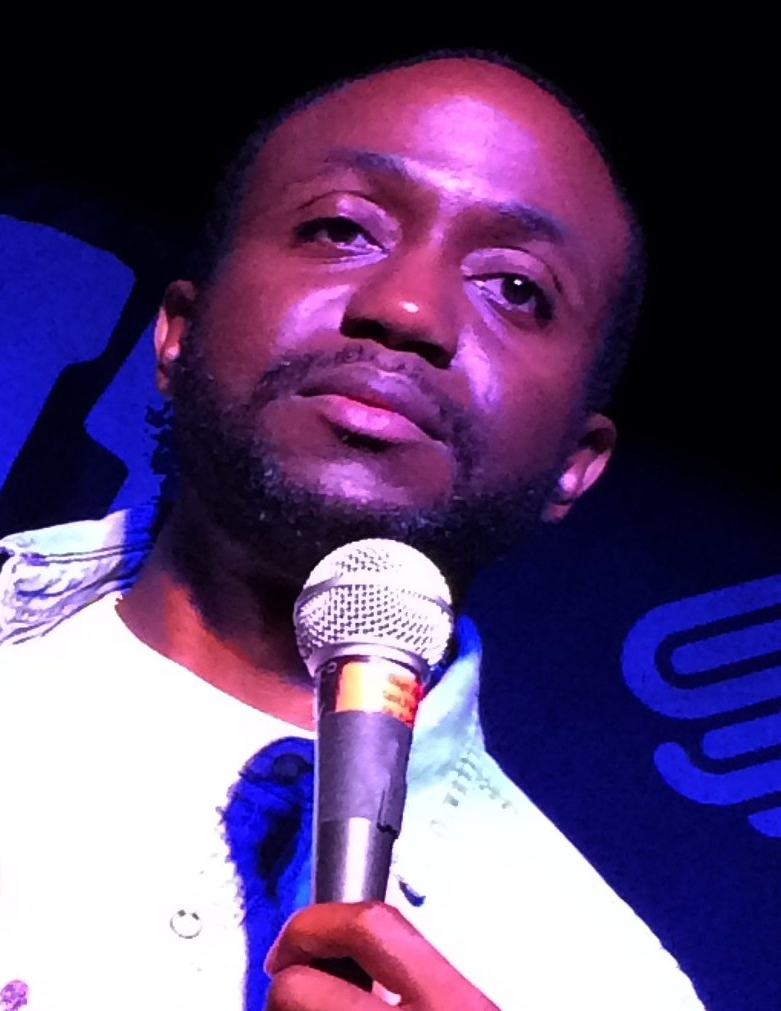
- Bowers in 2014
- Notable work: Comedy

Comedy career
- Years active: 2005–present
- Medium: Comedy, television, film, writing
- Subjects: Spirituality, travel, race, socioeconomics, gender roles
- Website: byronbowerslive.com

Byron Bowers is an American comedian, writer and actor. Bowers has appeared on The Eric Andre Show on Adult Swim, Comedy Central's Adam DeVine's House Party, and on the reboot of BET's Comic View. He made his late-night debut on The Pete Holmes Show followed by an appearance on Jimmy Kimmel Live. He appeared in MTV's Guy Code and in the History Channel comedy, The Crossroads of History. Bowers appeared in the first season of Lena Waithe's Showtime series drama The Chi as Meldrick. He also played the roommate of Lucas Hedges' character in the film Honey Boy, which won the Special Jury Prize at the 2019 Sundance Film Festival.

In 2016, Bowers performed at the Hollywood Bowl on a bill with Flying Lotus, Thundercat, and George Clinton as part of the Brainfeeder festival. He appeared in the horror film KUSO. His television credits include season 3 of The Meltdown on Comedy Central, Funny as Hell in Montreal for HBO Canada, and Flop House for Viceland. His festival performances include Oddball Comedy Fest, SXSW, Life is Beautiful, Austin City Limits, RIOT, SF Sketchfest, and Blue Whale Comedy Festival in Tulsa, Oklahoma.

Bowers grew up in Atlanta, Georgia, and moved to Los Angeles to pursue comedy in 2008.

== Filmography ==
=== Film and television work ===
- The Eric Andre Show, Principal (2012–2015)
- Adam DeVine's House Party, himself (2013)
- The Pete Holmes Show, himself (2014)
- Guy Code, himself (2015)
- Jimmy Kimmel Live!, himself (2015)
- Why? with Hannibal Buress, himself (2015)
- The 4th, Tim (2016)
- The Crossroads of History, Onesimus (2016)
- Viceland (2016)
- The Meltdown with Jonah and Kumail, himself (2016)
- Everybody Has an Andy Dick Story, himself (2016)
- KUSO, Roach Man (2017)
- NBA 2K18, Doc Johnson (2017)
- The Chi, Meldrick (2018)
- Honey Boy, Percy (2019)
- Concrete Cowboy, Rome (2020)
- No Sudden Move, Maurice (2021)
- Ten Year Old Tom, Nelson (voice) (2021)
- Kimi, Terry Hughes (2022)
- Irma Vep, Herman (2022)
- Swarm, George (2023)
- Lady in the Lake, Slappy (2024)
- Wonder Man, DeMarr Davis / Doorman (2026)

== Crew work ==
=== Writing work ===
- Upgraded (2012)
- Loiter Squad (2013)
- Lucas Bros. Moving Co. (2015)
