= Boaz Yakin =

American screenwriter and film director

- Born: June 20, 1965 (age 61); New York City, U.S.
- Occupations: Screenwriter; director; producer
- Years active: 1989–present
- Known for: Remember the Titans
- Spouse: Alma Har'el (m. 2004; div. 2012)

Boaz Yakin (Hebrew: בועז יכין; born June 20, 1965) is an American filmmaker based in New York City. He has written screenplays to films like The Rookie, Fresh, A Price Above Rubies, Prince of Persia: The Sands of Time, and Now You See Me, and has directed the 2000 sports drama Remember the Titans and the 2012 Jason Statham action film Safe. As a producer he has collaborated frequently with filmmaker Eli Roth and served as executive producer for the first two entries in the Hostel franchise.

== Early life ==
Yakin was born in New York City. Both his parents are Israeli-born, and met in Paris while studying miming with Marcel Marceau. His father's family are of Syrian Jewish and Egyptian Jewish descent, and his mother's family is of Ashkenazi Polish Jewish descent.

He attended the Bronx High School of Science, where he was classmates in 1983 with actor Jon Cryer. He studied filmmaking at City College of New York then at New York University and made his first deal for a screenplay at age 19.

== Career ==
After finishing school, Yakin worked in the film industry, developing projects for several companies, and saw his first screenplay reach the screen in 1989, when The Punisher, a vehicle for Dolph Lundgren, was released. Yakin's next screenplay was The Rookie, starring Clint Eastwood and Charlie Sheen. Wanting to take on more personal material, Yakin drew from his experiences growing up in New York's inner city for his next screenplay, Fresh. Yakin opted to direct his screenplay for Fresh himself. The film won critical acclaim, earning the Filmmaker's Trophy at the 1994 Sundance Film Festival.

Yakin went back to his youth for inspiration on his next project. His experience with the Chassidic community informed his screenplay for A Price Above Rubies. Yakin rebounded with his next assignment, which was his first film that he directed but did not write; Remember the Titans was a major box office success, and moved him to the upper tier of bankable Hollywood talents.

His Holocaust drama Death in Love debuted in January 2008. Yakin describes it as a movie about the failure of the family and inability to change your past.

He was a member of the US Dramatic Jury at the 2009 Sundance Film Festival.

In 2010, it was announced that Yakin would direct Sympathy for the Devil, with Samuel L. Jackson and Josh Duhamel in the cast. The project was still in development as of 2014.

Yakin's family film Max was released by Warner Bros. and MGM on June 26, 2015.

His 2020 film Aviva was set to premiere at the SXSW Film Festival, but was released publicly because of the COVID-19 pandemic.

== Personal life ==
Yakin was married to Israeli music video director Alma Har'el. The couple divorced in 2012.

== Filmography ==
Year	Title	Director	Writer	Producer
1989	The Punisher	No	Yes	No
1990	The Rookie	No	Yes	No
1994	Fresh	Yes	Yes	No
1998	A Price Above Rubies	Yes	Yes	No
1999	From Dusk Till Dawn 2: Texas Blood Money	No	Story	No
2000	Remember the Titans	Yes	No	No
2003	Uptown Girls	Yes	No	Executive
2004	Dirty Dancing: Havana Nights	No	Yes	No
2008	Death in Love	Yes	Yes	Yes
2010	Prince of Persia: The Sands of Time	No	Yes	No
2012	Safe	Yes	Yes	No
2013	Now You See Me	No	Yes	Executive
2015	Max	Yes	Yes	Executive
2018	Boarding School	Yes	Yes	No
2020	Aviva	Yes	Yes	Yes
2021	The Harder They Fall	No	Yes	No

Producer only

- 2001 Maniacs (2001)
- Bombay Beach (2011) (Documentary)

Executive producer only

- Hostel (2005)
- Hostel: Part II (2007)

== Books ==
- Marathon, a graphic novel illustrated by Joe Infurnari, First Second, 2012
- Jerusalem, a graphic novel illustrated by Nick Bertozzi, First Second, 2013
