= No Sudden Move =

2021 crime thriller film directed by Steven Soderbergh

- Official release poster
- Directed by: Steven Soderbergh
- Written by: Ed Solomon
- Produced by: Casey Silver
- Starring: Don Cheadle; Benicio del Toro; David Harbour; Jon Hamm; Amy Seimetz; Brendan Fraser; Matt Damon; Kieran Culkin; Noah Jupe; Craig muMs Grant; Julia Fox; Frankie Shaw; Ray Liotta; Bill Duke
- Cinematography: Peter Andrews
- Edited by: Mary Ann Bernard
- Music by: David Holmes
- Production company: Casey Silver Productions
- Distributed by: Warner Bros. Pictures
- Release dates: June 18, 2021 (Tribeca Festival); July 1, 2021 (United States)
- Running time: 115 minutes
- Country: United States
- Language: English

No Sudden Move is a 2021 American neo-noir crime thriller film written by Ed Solomon, directed by Steven Soderbergh, and produced by Casey Silver. The film features an ensemble cast including Don Cheadle, Benicio del Toro, David Harbour, Jon Hamm, Amy Seimetz, Brendan Fraser, Matt Damon, Kieran Culkin, Noah Jupe, Craig Grant (in his final appearance), Julia Fox, Frankie Shaw, Ray Liotta, and Bill Duke.

No Sudden Move had its world premiere at the Tribeca Film Festival on June 18, 2021, and was released in the United States on July 1, 2021, by HBO Max. The film received positive reviews from critics with praise for Soderbergh's direction and the performances of the cast.

== Plot ==
In 1954 Detroit, Michigan, gangster Curt Goynes, in need of cash to leave town, is recruited to threaten a family as part of a blackmail scheme, along with gangsters Ronald Russo and Charley. The recruiter, Doug Jones, sends them to the house of GM accountant Matt Wertz, where they are to hold the family hostage while sending Wertz to his office to retrieve a document from his boss's safe. Finding the safe empty, a desperate Wertz brings fake documents to Jones, then returns home, where Charley prepares to execute the entire family, to the surprise of Goynes and Russo. Not wanting to be part of a massacre, Goynes shoots and kills Charley.

Jones phones the house, having discovered the documents are fake, and orders Goynes to kill Russo and the family. Sensing something amiss, Goynes ignores the order and leaves with Russo, instructing the family to tell the police that Charley broke into their home and that Wertz killed Charley in self-defense. The police detective, Joe Finney, is skeptical of the family's story. Once the police leave, Goynes, Russo, and Wertz go to Wertz's boss's home in Ohio and retrieve the real document, which turns out to be plans for a new car part. Goynes and Russo discover they have a high bounty placed on their heads and make plans to ascertain what the document is worth by arranging a meeting with Frank Capelli, the mob leader who contracted the blackmail scheme, and whose wife Vanessa has been having an affair with Russo. Meanwhile, Goynes contacts mob leader Aldrick Watkins, who wants him dead, and arranges to clear himself by giving Watkins part of the eventual payment.

Goynes and Russo meet with Capelli. Goynes deduces that the value of the document vastly exceeds the amount they considered it was worth. Jones arrives and pulls a gun, showing that he and Capelli have been planning to turn on Goynes and Russo. In the resulting shootout, Jones is killed. Capelli flees, only to be caught by Goynes and Russo, who extract the name of his contact: Naismith, a Studebaker executive. Goynes calls Naismith and arranges to sell him the document for $125,000. Capelli escapes, but when he returns home, the battered Vanessa shoots and kills him and then departs with a suitcase with $31,000 in cash. Seeking a bigger payday, Goynes and Russo return to Wertz's boss's home and make him call a more senior contact, arrogant automobile manufacturer's association executive Mike Lowen. Goynes and Russo meet with Lowen at a downtown hotel, where he pays them $375,000 to return the document. It is revealed to be plans for a catalytic converter. Lowen is seeking to conceal its existence from the public to avoid government pressure on the car companies to implement pollution controls.

After Lowen leaves, Goynes and Russo split the money but are interrupted by Watkins and his men, who have already retrieved the $125,000 from Naismith. It initially appears that Goynes and Watkins have joined forces to betray Russo, but Watkins' men turn on Goynes and lead him away at gunpoint. Russo is allowed to leave with the $375,000. As Watkins and his men leave the hotel, they are stopped by Detective Finney and his policemen; Watkins bribes the detective with $50,000 of the Naismith money to let them leave with Goynes, saying that Goynes will be "taken care of." Russo flees the city with Vanessa, but when they leave the main road to avoid an apparent pursuer, she kills Russo and claims the money for herself. She is soon pulled over by a policeman, who takes the $375,000 as well as her $31,000 and then allows her to leave. Detective Finney, having retrieved the $406,000 from the cop, privately returns it to Lowen, along with the $50,000 bribe from Watkins. Watkins takes Goynes to a pier, but rather than "take care" of him, he makes amends with him. He offers Goynes a share of the remaining Naismith money, but Goynes wants only the $5,000 he originally contracted for and is allowed to leave for Kansas City.

== Cast ==
- Don Cheadle as Curt Goynes
- Benicio del Toro as Ronald Russo
- David Harbour as Matt Wertz
- Ray Liotta as Frank Capelli
- Jon Hamm as Joe Finney
- Amy Seimetz as Mary Wertz
- Brendan Fraser as Doug Jones
- Kieran Culkin as Charley
- Noah Jupe as Matthew Wertz Jr.
- Craig Grant as Jimmy
- Julia Fox as Vanessa Capelli
- Frankie Shaw as Paula Cole
- Bill Duke as Aldrick Watkins

In addition, Matt Damon makes an uncredited cameo appearance as Mike Lowen.

== Production ==
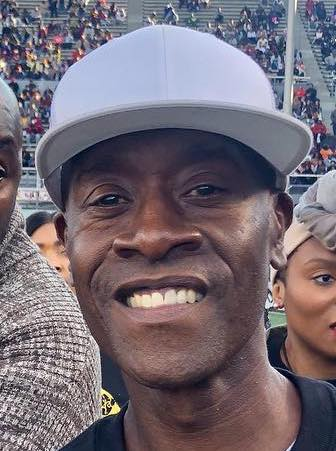
Don Cheadle
(Curt Goynes)

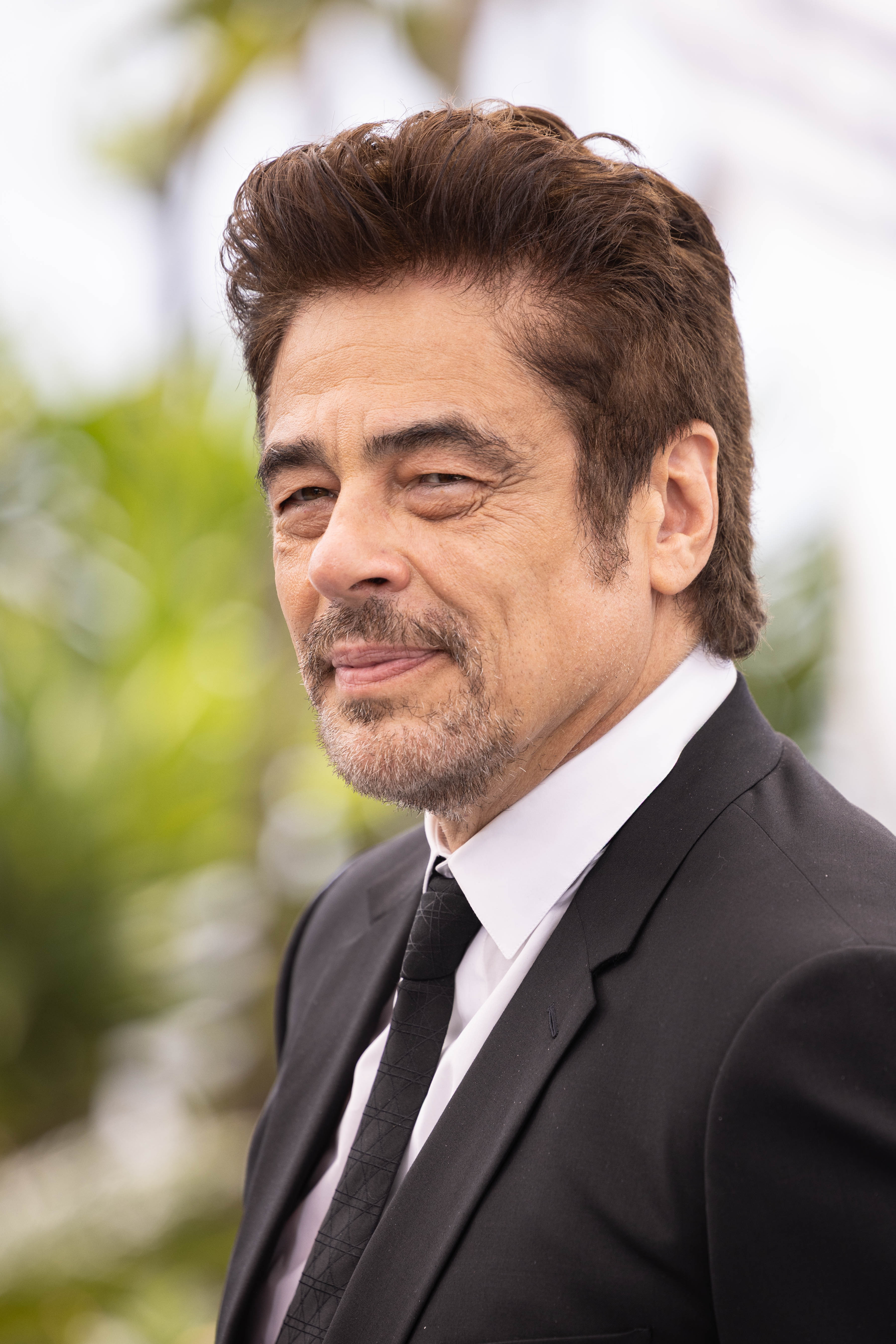
Benicio del Toro
(Ronald Russo)

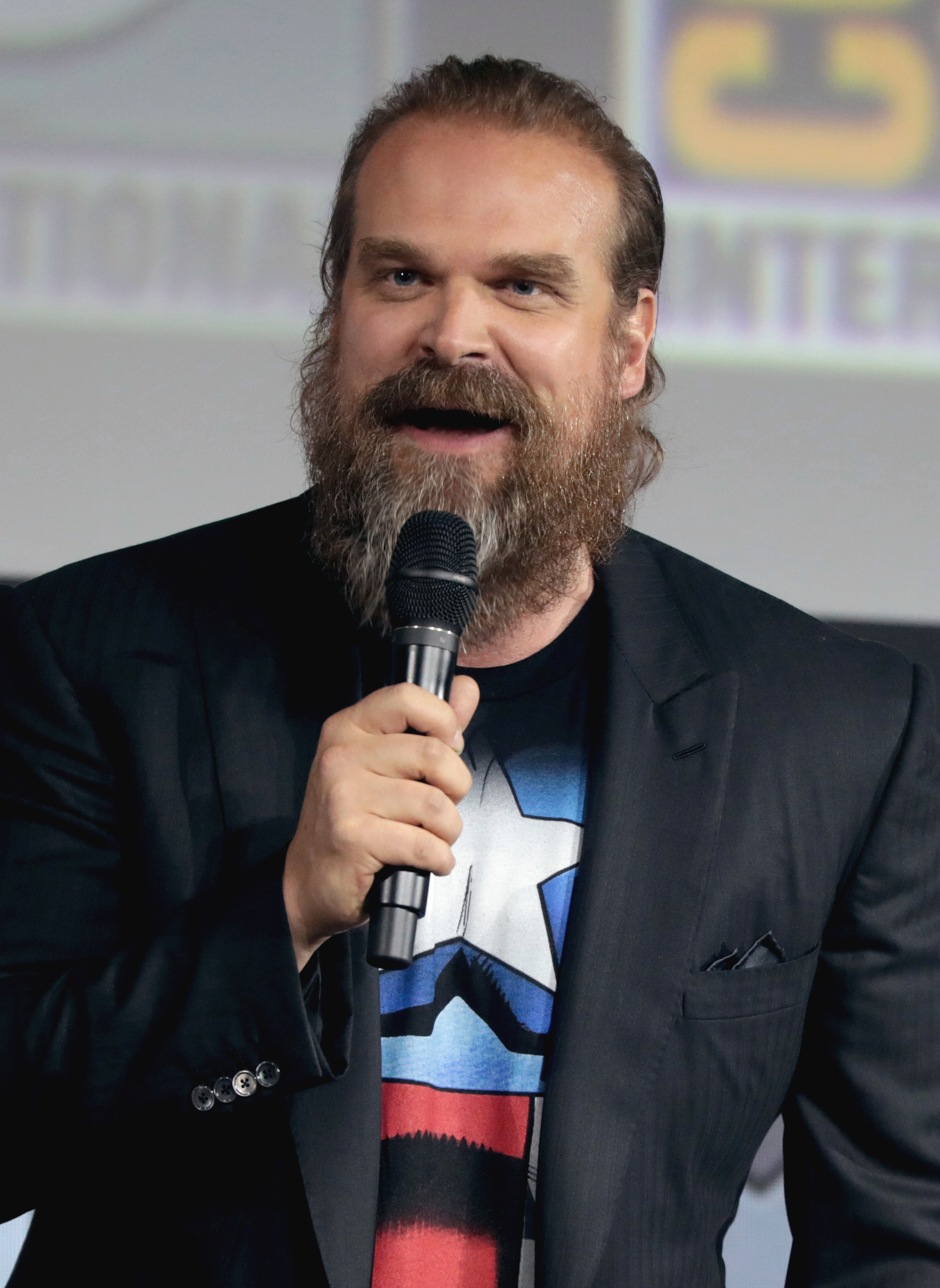
David Harbour
(Matt Wertz)

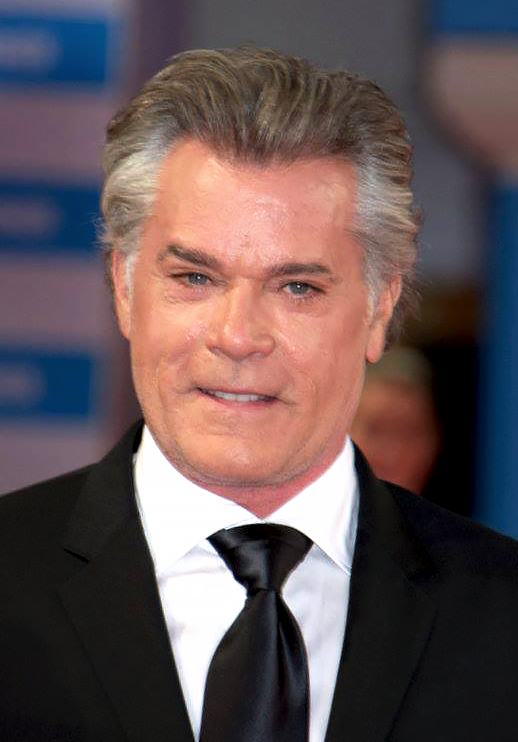
Ray Liotta
(Frank Capelli)

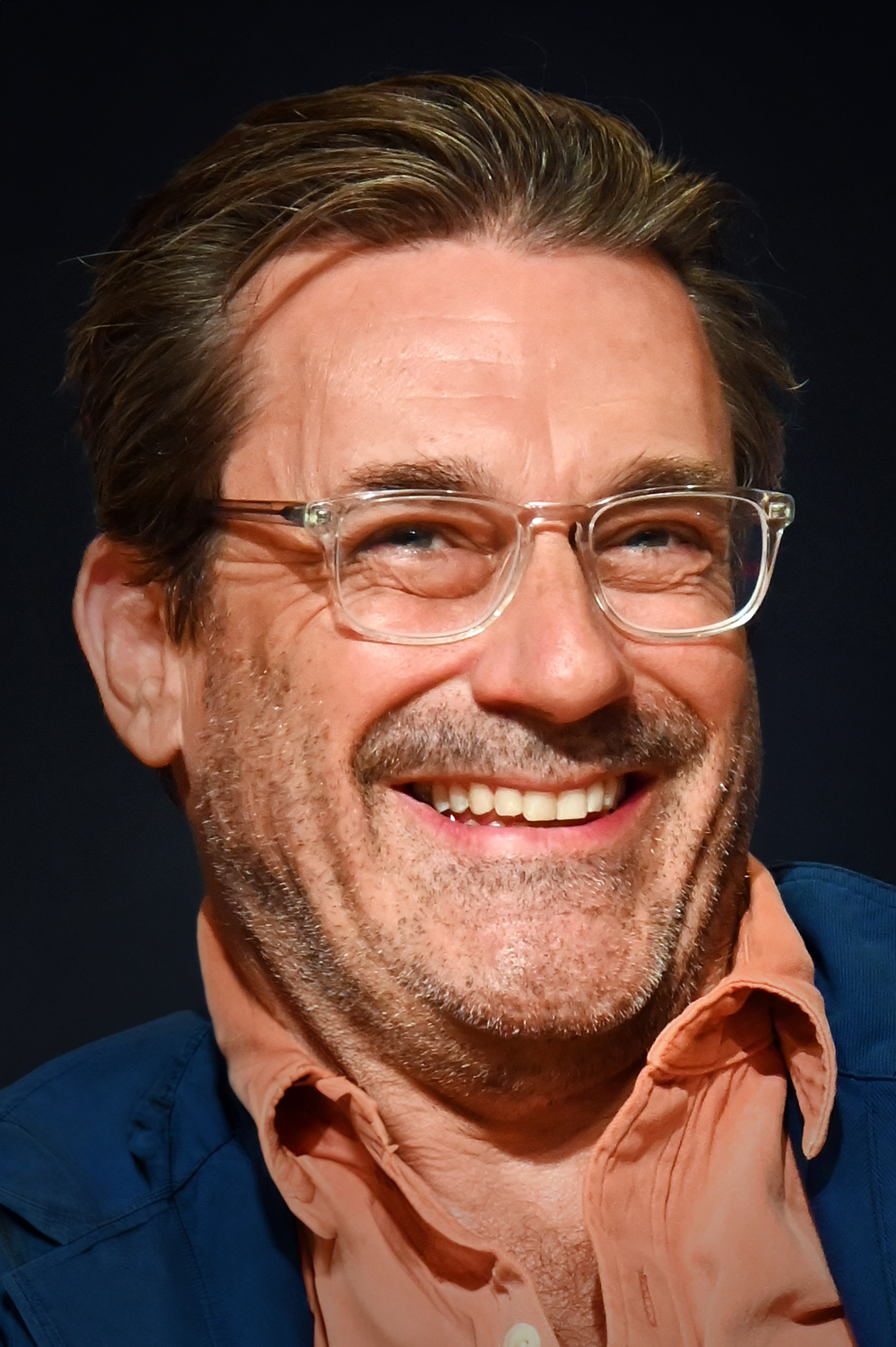
Jon Hamm
(Joe Finney)

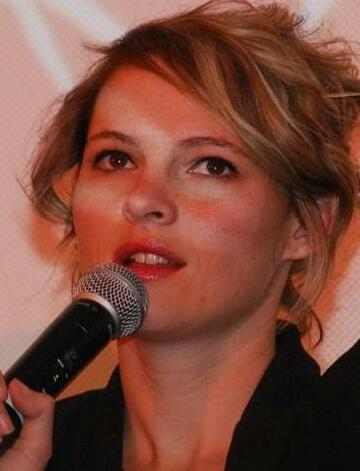
Amy Seimetz
(Mary Wertz)

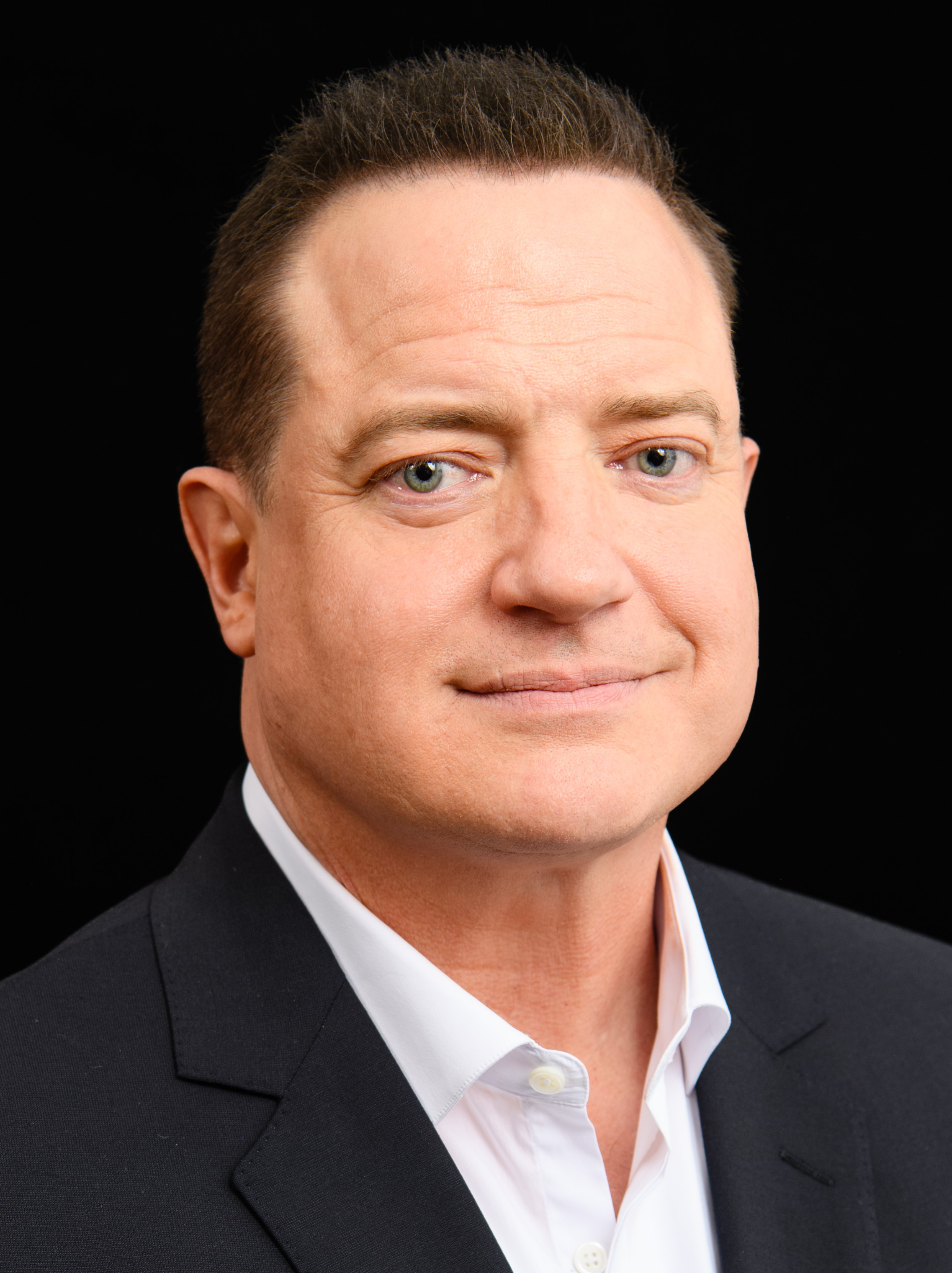
Brendan Fraser
(Doug Jones)

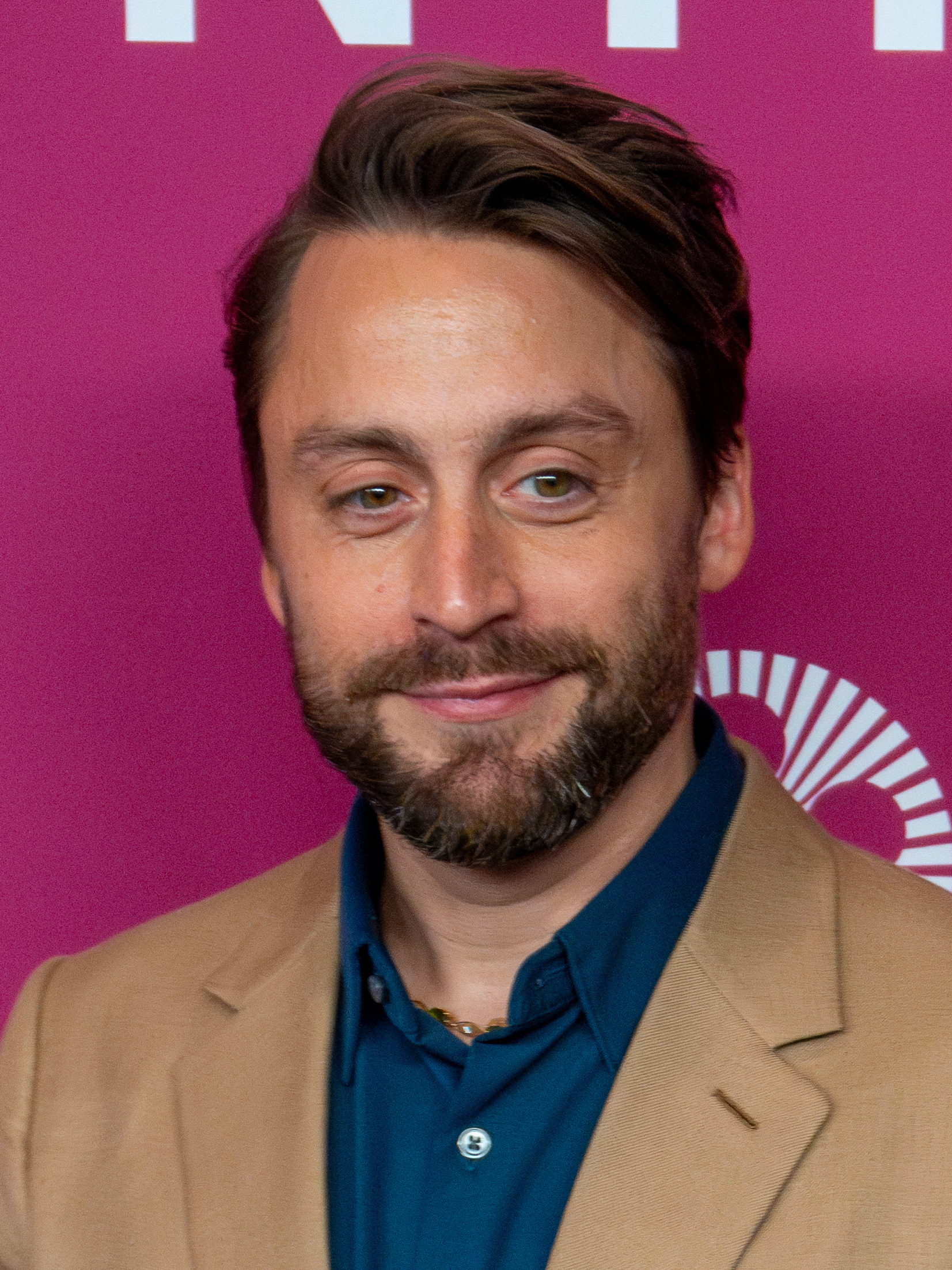
Kieran Culkin
(Charley)

It was announced in November 2019 that Steven Soderbergh would direct the film, then titled Kill Switch, with Josh Brolin, Don Cheadle, Sebastian Stan and John Cena in consideration to star. By March 2020, Jon Hamm and Cedric the Entertainer entered negotiations, with Brolin dropping out. In May 2020, it was announced Cheadle, Stan and Hamm were confirmed, with Benicio del Toro, Ray Liotta, Amy Seimetz, Frankie Shaw and George Clooney joining the cast.

Filming was due to begin on April 1, 2020, but was delayed as a result of the COVID-19 pandemic. Soderbergh stated he was hoping to restart in September. The film was retitled No Sudden Move, and began filming in Detroit on September 28, with David Harbour, Brendan Fraser, Kieran Culkin, Noah Jupe, Bill Duke and Julia Fox joining the cast, while actors Stan, Cena and Clooney departed due to production delays. In October, Matt Damon was added to the cast in a cameo role. Production wrapped on November 12.

The film was shot with Red Digital Cinema Monstro cameras and Kowa anamorphic lenses.

== Release ==
No Sudden Move had its world premiere at the Tribeca Film Festival on June 18, 2021. It was released on HBO Max on July 1, 2021.

== Reception ==
=== Viewership ===
According to Samba TV, the film was watched by 567,000 households over its first four days.

=== Critical response ===
On review aggregator website Rotten Tomatoes, the film reports an approval rating of 92% based on 140 reviews with an average rating of 7.8/10. The site's critics consensus reads, "While it may not be on par with his best crime capers, No Sudden Move finds Soderbergh on entertainingly familiar ground—and making the most of an excellent cast." According to Metacritic, which assigned a weighted average score of 76 out of 100 based on 38 critics, the film received "generally favorable reviews".

Richard Roeper of Chicago Sun-Times gave the film 3.5 out of 4 stars and wrote, "Another instantly immersive, richly layered and beautifully shot chapter in one of the most impressive directing careers of our time." Writing for The A.V. Club, Mike D'Angelo gave the film a "B+" grade, calling it a "twisty new caper" said: "Movies routinely place characters in desperate, life-or-death situations, but rarely do we see them behave in a genuinely desperate way. No Sudden Move, a period crime drama written by Ed Solomon and directed by Steven Soderbergh, corrects this oversight in a way that's at once hilarious and distressing."
