= PJ Pereira =

Brazilian advertising executive

- Born: 1973 (age 52–53); Rio de Janeiro
- Occupations: Advertising executive, screenwriter, novelist
- Organization: Pereira O'Dell
- Title: Co-founder, creative chairman
- Board member of: Ad Council, the Advertising Club of New York, The One Club
- Writing career
- Pen name: PJ Caldas.
- Genre: YA
- Notable works: The Girl from Wudang: My Name Is Tigress and I Am Immortal. This Is My Story (2023, Tuttle Publishing)
- Notable awards: Daytime Emmy Awards (2013) The American Heritage Award (2021)
- Website: www.pjcaldas.com

PJ Pereira is a Brazilian advertising executive and novelist and screenwriter writing under the pen name of PJ Caldas. He is co-founder and creative chairman of the Pereira O'Dell advertising agency. (Note: Which has offices in the U.S. and Brazil, counts A-B InBev, Mattel, and Intel among its clients, with the Intel campaign "The Beauty Inside" winning several Cannes Lions in 2013.) Pereira's agency's work includes high-profile campaigns for Intel, Toshiba, and Skype. As a novelist, his 2023 novel The Girl from Wudang: My Name Is Tigress and I Am Immortal. This Is My Story won the PenCraft Seasonal Awards for Science Fiction. In 2021, Pereira received the American Heritage Award by the American Immigration Council. He is the editor of "The Art of Branded Entertainment," (2018) the first book published by a Cannes jury. Pereira serves as a board member of the Ad Council, the Advertising Club of New York, and The One Club. His trilogy, Gods of Both Worlds, reintroduced the Yoruba Orisha to contemporary Brazilian culture and explored African-Brazilian traditions.

== Early life and education ==
Pereira was born in Rio de Janeiro in 1973. Born in a conservative religious family, his parents worked in the Senate, and his grandfather was a senator. At the age of 13, Pereira learned to program and got a part-time job with his uncle. Pereira started his career as a programmer. He started an agency in Brazil. During his freshmen year in college, at the age of 19, he wrote a book (titled The Lean Company) that became that year's best-seller in Brazil. The university allowed Pereira to skip studying for a Masters degree and pursue a PhD.

== Career ==
=== Advertising ===
In 1996, Pereira interrupted his Ph.D. studies and joined DM9 a São Paulo-based advertising agency. In 1998, he did his first campaign for the São Paulo creative week. The campaign won a gold at the Cannes Lions that year.

Pereira started his career in Brazil, founding AgenciaClick. He later moved to the US, working at AKQA before co-founding Pereira & O'Dell. Upon moving to San Francisco, he encountered significant challenges in the advertising industry due to cultural differences and initial resistance from colleagues. Pereira recalls, "My first six months in this country were the worst six months in my entire career. I felt like a fraud." He also noted, "I realized I wasn't just a crazy guy — I was a crazy guy from Brazil."

In 2005, Pereira was named to head the Cyber Lions' jury.

In 2013, Pereira received the Daytime Entertainment Emmy Award for Innovation, for his web series The Beauty Inside.

Pereira serves as a board member of the Ad Council and the Advertising Club of New York.

Pereira served as the jury president for the Entertainment Lions at the 2017 Cannes Lions Festival, held from June 21–22 that year.

In a 2023 interview with DesignRush, PJ Pereira said he believes that AI can significantly enhance the creative process by enabling rapid experimentation and iteration, allowing for more innovative and unexpected outcomes. However, he emphasized the need for thoughtful discussions about the ethical implications and societal impact of AI development.

=== On Artificial Intelligence ===
==== AI and advertising ====
Pereira has been a vocal advocate for the integration of AI within the advertising industry, emphasizing its potential to strengthen agency-client relationships. He believes that as AI becomes more embedded in agency workflows and client systems, it could lead to longer, more stable partnerships. Pereira has expressed optimism about AI's role in creating closer collaborations between agencies and brands, arguing that the complexities introduced by AI-driven processes would make it more challenging for clients to switch agencies. This, he suggests, could bring back the longer-term relationships that were once common in the industry. His agency, Pereira O'Dell, has actively invested in AI, launching a dedicated business unit to explore AI's possibilities, with the aim of enhancing their client offerings and staying at the forefront of technological advancements.

==== AI and art ====
Pereira explores the evolving intersection of artificial intelligence and art. He emphasizes a nuanced perspective on the debate surrounding AI-generated art. Pereira acknowledges the contention that AI tools like Midjourney might democratize art creation, making it sound like anyone who can write prompts is therefore an artist. Pereira questions the artistic validity of merely inputting prompts. In his 2023 essay titled "5 A.I. Artists Pushing the Limits of Creativity and Generative Tech", Pereira highlights five pioneering AI artists: José Parra (Chema Parsanz), known for surreal, lifelike photography; Chelsea Kinley, a product designer with a vibrant, unique palette; Torus トーラス, who crafts an encyclopedic, fantastical universe; Remi Molette, an AI film director blending dance and rhythm; and Roope rAInisto, an explorer of AI's technical quirks. Pereira advocates for critical engagement with AI's implications, particularly regarding the protection of human artists' work.

=== Fiction ===
Pereira was recognized by the Dictionary of Brazilian Literature as one of the most important writers of the 21st century. He has published four books inspired by African diaspora mythology, achieving top five best-seller status multiple times. His book trilogy Gods of Both Worlds was published in 2015. In 2017, his fourth novel The Mother, The Daughter and The Lady Spirit ( Portuguese: A mãe, a filha e o espírito da santa) was published in Brazil.

Pereira has reintroduced the Yoruba Orishas to contemporary Brazilian culture through his best-selling trilogy, Gods of Both Worlds. Growing up in a Catholic environment that labeled African religions as "devil shit", Pereira's perspective changed after a close friend's stories about Yoruba myths inspired him to explore these rich traditions. In a 2018 interview to the Women's Media Center, he emphasized the inclusive and non-judgmental nature of the Yoruba religion, noting, "There is no judgment day, end of the world, heaven or hell for the Orishas." Pereira acknowledges his "white privilege" in achieving success and highlights the challenges African-Brazilian traditions face, including modern persecution by evangelical-aligned drug traffickers. Despite potential backlash, he received an award from the African religious community for his contributions, demonstrating a significant impact on the perception of African culture in Brazil.

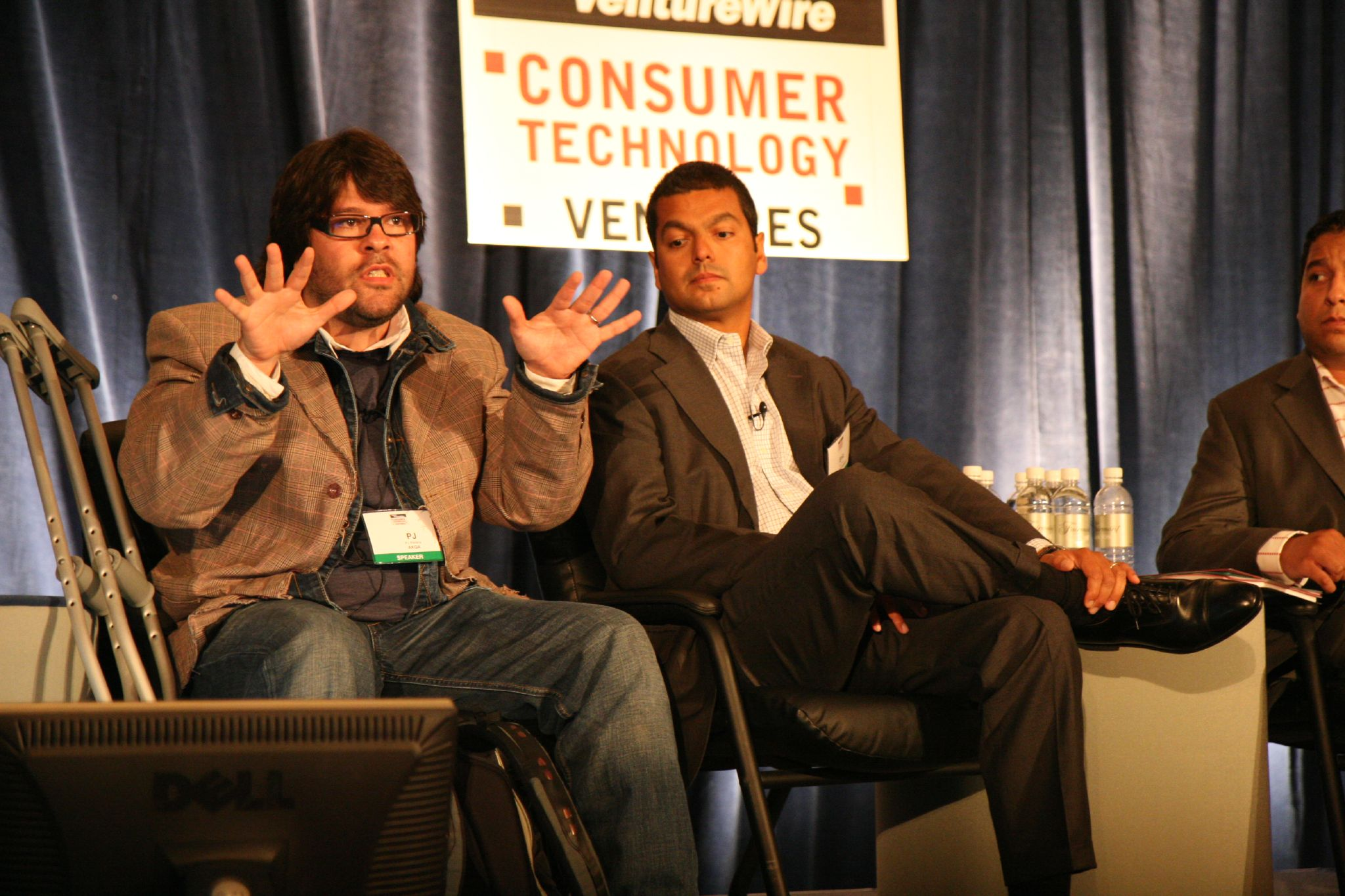
Pereira at the 2006 DowJones VentureWire Consumer Technology Ventures Conference

== Awards ==
- 2024 PenCraft Seasonal Awards for Science Fiction for his 2023 novel, The Girl from Wudang: My Name Is Tigress and I Am Immortal.
- 2021 American Heritage Award by the American Immigration Council
- 2013 Daytime Entertainment Emmy Award for Innovation, for his web series The Beauty Inside.

== Personal life ==
Pereira is a martial artist. He holds black belts in Shaolin Kempo, Wing Chun, and Karate, and has trained in various other combat sports, including Brazilian Jiu-Jitsu, in which he holds a blue belt. Pereira is married and has a son.
