= Noah Jupe =

English actor (born 2005)

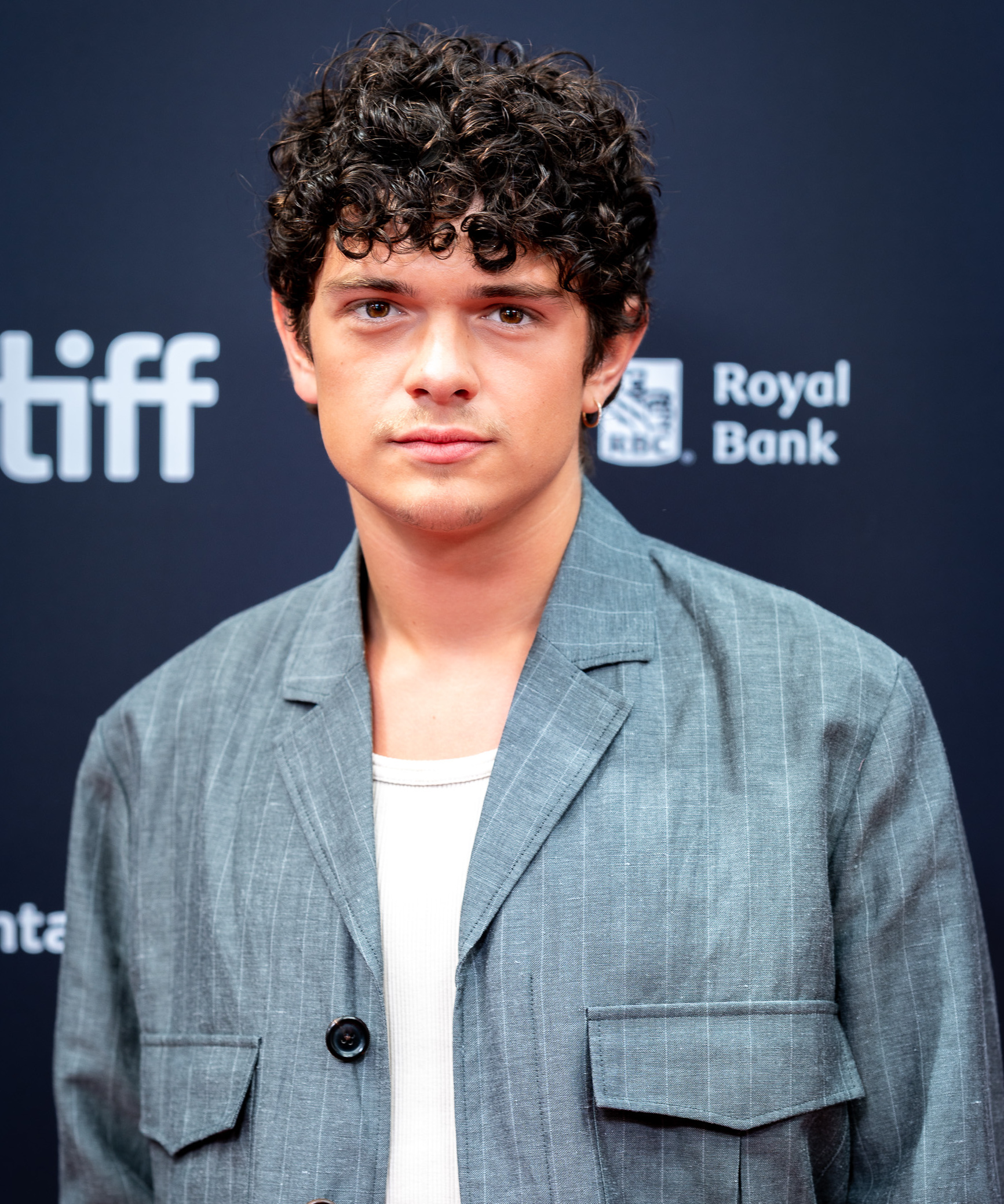
- Jupe in 2025
- Born: 25 February 2005 (age 21); London, England
- Occupation: Actor
- Years active: 2015–present
- Family: Katy Cavanagh (mother); Jacobi Jupe (brother)
- Awards: Full list

Noah Casford Jupe (born 25 February 2005) is an English actor. Known for his work in film and television, his accolades include nominations for an Actor Award, a Critics' Choice Award, and an Independent Spirit Award.

As a child actor, Jupe gained recognition for his roles in the television series The Night Manager (2016; 2026) and The Undoing (2020). He also appeared in a number of films of this period, including the dark comedy Suburbicon (2017), the drama Wonder (2017), the horror film A Quiet Place (2018) and its sequel A Quiet Place Part II (2021), and the sports drama Ford v Ferrari (2019).

Jupe received critical acclaim for his performance in the film Honey Boy (2019), which earned him a nomination for the Critics' Choice Movie Award for Best Young Performer. He has since appeared in the television limited series Franklin (2024) and Lady in the Lake (2025), and the historical drama Hamnet (2025).

== Early life ==
Noah Jupe was born on 25 February 2005 in London to filmmaker Chris Jupe and actress Katy Cavanagh. He has a younger sister and a younger brother, Jacobi, who is also an actor. He grew up in the north of England. When young he watched many films, which would "be the source of [his] imagination for days after" seeing them. His early acting career limited his formal schooling.

== Career ==
Jupe started his acting career in 2015 by appearing in the television series Penny Dreadful and Downton Abbey. Later in 2016, he played a significant role in the spy thriller series The Night Manager. In 2016, he also played a significant role in the series Houdini & Doyle. In 2017, he started his career in films, with his first major role being in The Man with the Iron Heart, a World War II drama. Also that year, he appeared in the British film That Good Night; had one of the lead roles in the black comedy film Suburbicon, directed by George Clooney; and appeared in the comedy-drama Wonder as Jack Will, best friend to Auggie Pullman. He was also cast in the short film adaptation of Stephen King's "My Pretty Pony" (1988).

In 2018, he starred in the science fiction film The Titan and in the horror film A Quiet Place. John Krasinski, who co-wrote and directed A Quiet Place, cast Jupe on Clooney's recommendation.

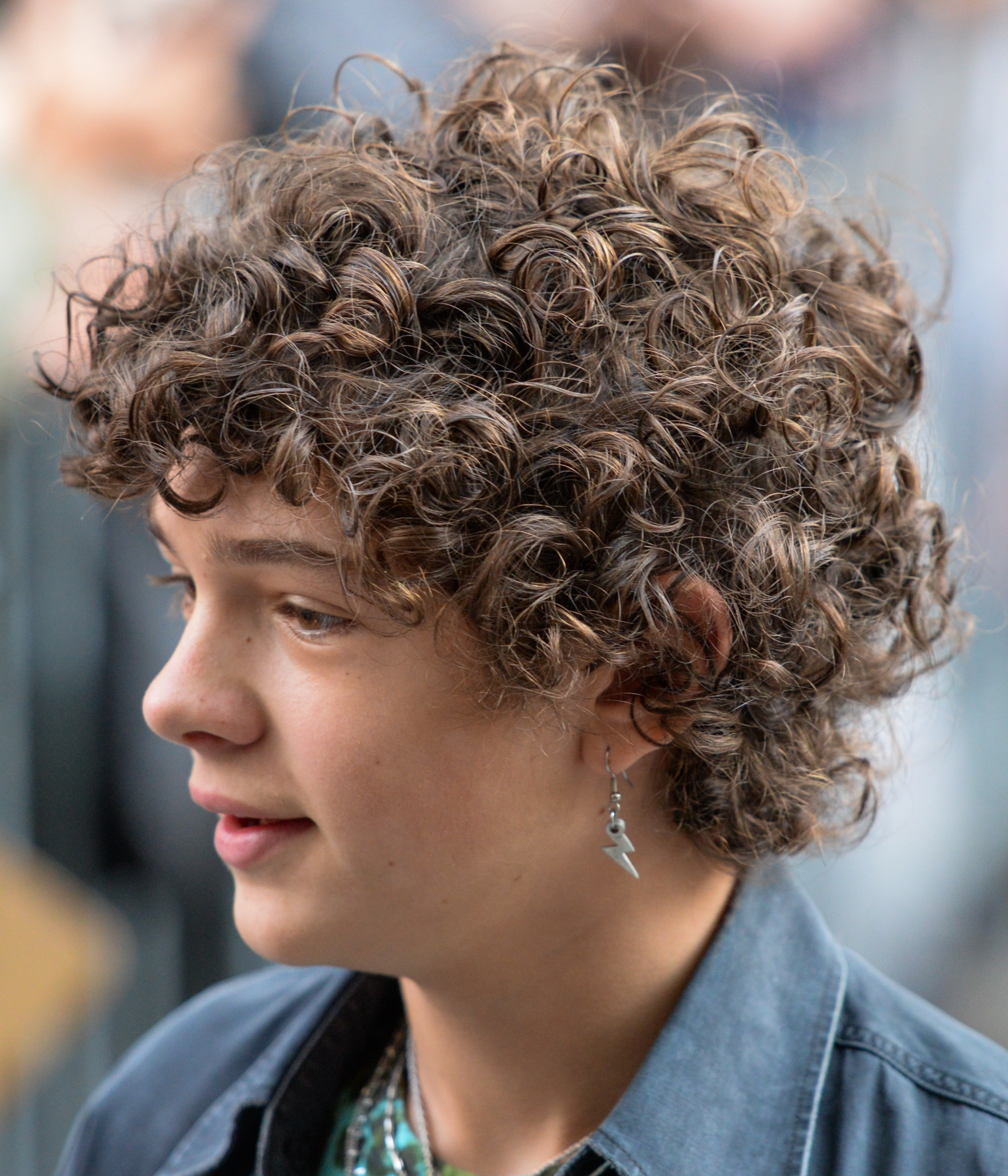
Jupe at the 2019 Toronto International Film Festival

In 2019, Jupe starred in Honey Boy. The independent film is based on Shia LaBeouf's coming-of-age in the entertainment industry, with Jupe playing the young version of the character based on LaBeouf. That same year, Jupe also starred in the film Ford v Ferrari. In 2020, he starred in the miniseries The Undoing.

Jupe was featured among "The 12 Young Creatives" in British Vogue's March 2021 issue. He reprised his role as Marcus Abbott in A Quiet Place Part II later that year. Jupe voiced Peter in the animated film The Magician's Elephant. In 2022, it was announced that he had been cast in the sci-fi drama film Morning, directed by Justin Kurzel. Additionally, he was cast to star in Apple TV+'s two miniseries Franklin and Lady in the Lake. In November 2025, it was announced that Jupe would be starring in the West End adaptation of Romeo and Juliet. The production, directed by Robert Icke will be opening in March 2026 at the Harold Pinter Theatre in London.

In September 2026, Jupe was cast in a "key" role for the Marvel Cinematic Universe (MCU) film Avengers: Secret Wars (2027).

== Acting credits ==
=== Film ===
Key
†	Denotes films that have not yet been released

Year	Title	Role	Notes
2017	The Man with the Iron Heart	Ata Moravec	
2017	That Good Night	Ronaldo	
2017	Suburbicon	Nicky Lodge	
2017	Wonder	Jack Will	
2017	My Pretty Pony	Clive Banning	Short film
2018	Holmes & Watson	Doxy	
2018	A Quiet Place	Marcus Abbott	
2018	The Titan	Lucas Janssen	
2019	Ford v Ferrari	Peter Miles	
2019	Honey Boy	Young Otis Lort	
2020	A Quiet Place Part II	Marcus Abbott	
2021	No Sudden Move	Matthew Wertz	
2022	Dreamin' Wild	Young Donnie Emerson	
2023	The Magician's Elephant	Peter	Voice
2025	& Sons	Andy Dyer	
2025	Hamnet	Actor playing Hamlet	
2025	The Carpenter's Son	The Boy	
2026	The Death of Robin Hood	Arthur / Godwyn	
2027	A Quiet Place Part III †	Marcus Abbott	Filming
TBA	Play Dead †	TBA	Post-production
TBA	Psyche †	TBA	Post-production

=== Television ===
Year	Title	Role	Notes
2015	Downton Abbey	Child	Series 6, episode 6
2015	Penny Dreadful	Charles Chandler	Episode: "And They Were Enemies"
2015	A Song for Jenny	William	Television film
2016	Houdini & Doyle	Kingsley Conan Doyle	Recurring role
2016	The Last Dragonslayer	Tiger Prawns	Television film
2016; 2026	The Night Manager	Daniel Roper	Recurring role (series 1); main role (series 2)
2020	The Undoing	Henry Fraser	Miniseries; main role
2024	Franklin	William Temple Franklin	Miniseries; main role
2024	Lady in the Lake	Seth	Miniseries; main role

=== Music videos ===
Year	Title	Artist	Ref.
2019	"From Chaos to Harmony"	Ian Brown	
2026	"Lost In The Night"	Dead Man's Bones	

=== Theatre ===
Year	Title	Role	Director	Venue	Ref.
2026	Romeo & Juliet	Romeo	Robert Icke	Harold Pinter Theatre	

== Awards and nominations ==
Year	Award	Category	Nominated work	Result	Ref.
2018	London Film Critics' Circle	Young British/Irish Performer of the Year	The Man with the Iron Heart	Nominated	
2018	London Film Critics' Circle	Young British/Irish Performer of the Year	Suburbicon	Nominated	
2018	London Film Critics' Circle	Young British/Irish Performer of the Year	Wonder	Nominated	
2018	Los Angeles Online Film Critics Society	Best Performance by an Actor 23 and Under	A Quiet Place	Nominated	
2018	Young Artist Awards	Best Performance in a Feature Film – Leading Teen Actor	Suburbicon	Nominated	
2019	Gotham Independent Film Awards	Breakthrough Actor	Honey Boy	Nominated	
2019	Indiana Film Journalists Association	Best Actor	Honey Boy	Nominated	
2019	Las Vegas Film Critics Society	Youth in Film – Male	Honey Boy	Won	
2019	London Film Critics' Circle	Young British/Irish Performer of the Year	Holmes & Watson	Nominated	
2019	London Film Critics' Circle	Young British/Irish Performer of the Year	A Quiet Place	Nominated	
2019	London Film Critics' Circle	Young British/Irish Performer of the Year	That Good Night	Nominated	
2019	London Film Critics' Circle	Young British/Irish Performer of the Year	The Titan	Nominated	
2019	Seattle Film Critics Society	Best Youth Performance	Honey Boy	Nominated	
2019	Washington D.C. Area Film Critics Association	Best Youth Performance	Honey Boy	Nominated	
2020	Austin Film Critics Association	Breakthrough Artist Award	Honey Boy	Nominated	
2020	Critics' Choice Movie Awards	Best Young Actor/Actress	Honey Boy	Nominated	
2020	Independent Spirit Awards	Best Supporting Male	Honey Boy	Nominated	
2020	Hollywood Film Critics Association	Best Performance by an Actor 23 and Under	Honey Boy	Won	
2020	London Film Critics' Circle	Young British/Irish Performer of the Year (shared with Ford v Ferrari)	Honey Boy	Nominated	
2020	Online Film and Television Association	Best Youth Performance	Honey Boy	Runner-up	
2021	Las Vegas Film Critics Society	Youth in Film – Male	A Quiet Place Part II	Nominated	
2021	Online Film and Television Association	Best Supporting Actor in a Motion Picture or Limited Series	The Undoing	Nominated	
2022	Saturn Awards	Best Performance by a Younger Actor	A Quiet Place Part II	Nominated	
2025	New York Film Critics Online	Best Supporting Actor	Hamnet	Nominated	
2026	Actor Awards	Outstanding Cast in a Motion Picture	Hamnet	Nominated	
