= Bombay Beach (film) =

2011 documentary film by Alma Har'el

- Film poster
- Directed by: Alma Har'el
- Produced by: Alma Har'el; Boaz Yakin; Rafael Marmor
- Cinematography: Alma Har'el
- Edited by: Alma Har'el and Joe Lindquist
- Music by: Zach Condon; Bob Dylan (songs)
- Release dates: April 2011 (Tribeca); October 4, 2011 (United States)
- Country: United States
- Language: English

Bombay Beach is a 2011 documentary film directed and produced by Israeli filmmaker Alma Har'el. The film was nominated for an Independent Spirit "Truer than Fiction" Award, won "Best Feature Documentary" at the 2011 Tribeca Film Festival, and has been taught in several universities including Duke University and Harvard's Sensory Ethnography Lab and Film Center as a genre redefining work. Taking place in the Salton Sea, a rusting relic of a failed 1950s development boom, Bombay Beach is a dreamlike poem that sets three personal stories to a stylized melding of observational documentary and choreographed dance to music specially composed for the film by Zach Condon of the band Beirut, and songs by Bob Dylan.

Filmmaker Terry Gilliam called the film, "A beautiful, quirky, and ultimately very moving film about the American Dream on the edge of a desert sea."

== Plot ==
The film tells the story of three protagonists: Benny Parrish, a young boy diagnosed with bipolar disorder whose troubled soul and vivid imagination create both suffering and joy for him and his complex and loving family; "CeeJay" (played by Cedric Thompson), a black teenager and aspiring football player who has taken refuge in Bombay Beach hoping to avoid the same fate of his cousin who was murdered by a gang of youths in Los Angeles; and that of Red, an ancient survivor, once an oil field worker, living on the fumes of whiskey, cigarettes, and an irrepressible love of life. Together they make up a triptych of American manhood in its decisive moments, populating the Salton Sea's land of thwarted opportunity. The New York Times writes, “[Bombay Beach] feels like a fever dream about an alternate universe. Suffused with a sense of wonder, it hovers, dancing inside its own ethereal bubble.”

Har’el explains about the film, “This film can only serve to show glimpses into some of the larger issues one can pick out from these people’s lives and the way in which they live their lives in this particular place. All these things that can be perceived as wrong or right, or bad or good, all reside together, side by side. This is the human experience of life and that’s what I wanted to illustrate more than anything, how things co-exist, all the wrongs and the rights together, the love and the violence, the broken dream and the persistence of dreams. Even though the dream is broken, you can still see the people.”

From Salon: “You either like this kind of ambitious, brave, borderless experiment or you don’t, and I think it’s absolutely magical and tragic. Maybe it took a foreign-born Jewish filmmaker to make a movie that seems so positively biblical (…) about the current conditions of America.”

== Critical reception ==
Bombay Beach premiered at the Panorama Section of the 61st Berlin International Film Festival in 2011 and received a 77% positive rating on Rotten Tomatoes, with 39 reviews.

Filmanzeiger writes, “This documentary turns out to be a strikingly great, strong visual portrait of people at the literal edge of all social margins of Western societies. In the middle of a film festival of 385 films, with Alma Har'el's Bombay Beach there's suddenly a cinematic gem, whose charisma and sustainability makes us forget most of the Berlinale this year and in recent years completely.” Bombay Beach continued to receive critical praise in film festivals around the world, culminating in the 2011 Tribeca Film Festival, where it won "Best Documentary Feature". From the Associated Press, “Arguably the hit of the festival, Alma Har'el's lyrical debut was the unanimous jury choice [...] Many fictional films try to portray dignity in rural decay, but the authentically poetic Bombay Beach is the real deal."

Salon wrote, saying “Bombay Beach feels infused with tremendous compassion, and paints a half-accidental portrait of life near the very bottom of the recessionary pyramid.” Village Voice, meanwhile, called it a, “Hybrid doc knockout", while Time Out NY claimed, “The movie constantly upends all the usual nonfiction tropes.” The Guardian described the movie as “An eerily compelling documentary about lost souls in a lost place.”

Bombay Beach was promoted by Focus Features in the US and Dogwoof in the UK, and has been broadcast widely.

== Film festivals ==
- 2011 Woodstock Film Festival
- Internationale Filmfestspiele Berlin
- Tribeca Film Festival
- Sheffield International Documentary Film Festival
- Camden International Film Festival
- Edinburgh International Film Festival
- Guanajuato International Film Festival

== Awards ==
- (2011) Winner - Best Documentary - Tribeca Film Festival
- (2011) Nominated - Independent Spirit "Truer than Fiction" award
- (2011) Winner - Best Editing - Woodstock Film Festival
- (2011) Winner - Emerging Cinematic Vision - Camden International Film Festival
- (2012) Nominated - Cinema Eye Honors "Best Film Debut" and "Best Cinematography"
- (2011) - Winner Special Mention Jury Award - Sheffield Doc/Fest
- (2011) - Winner, Best Documentary- Guanajuato International Film Festival

== See also ==
- Plagues & Pleasures on the Salton Sea, 2006 documentary film
