= Honey Boy (film) =

2019 film directed by Alma Har'el

- Theatrical release poster
- Directed by: Alma Har'el
- Written by: Shia LaBeouf
- Produced by: Anita Gou; Alma Har'el; Brian Kavanaugh-Jones; Christopher Legget; Daniela Taplin Lundberg
- Starring: Shia LaBeouf; Lucas Hedges; Noah Jupe; FKA Twigs; Maika Monroe; Natasha Lyonne
- Cinematography: Natasha Braier
- Edited by: Dominic LaPerriere; Monica Salazar
- Music by: Alex Somers
- Production companies: Automatik; Stay Gold Features; Delirio Films
- Distributed by: Amazon Studios
- Release dates: January 25, 2019 (Sundance); November 8, 2019 (United States)
- Running time: 94 minutes
- Country: United States
- Language: English
- Budget: $3.5 million
- Box office: $3.4 million

Honey Boy is a 2019 American drama film directed by Alma Har'el and written by Shia LaBeouf. The film is loosely based on LaBeouf's childhood and his relationship with his father. Honey Boy stars LaBeouf, Lucas Hedges, Noah Jupe and FKA Twigs.

LaBeouf originally wrote the script as a form of therapy during his stay in a rehabilitation center. The project was announced in March 2018, and the cast was filled out over the next two months. Filming took place in Los Angeles over the course of about three weeks.

Honey Boy had its world premiere at the Sundance Film Festival on January 25, 2019, and was released on November 8, 2019, by Amazon Studios. The film received largely positive reviews from critics, who praised Har'el's direction as well as the performances of LaBeouf, Hedges and Jupe.

== Plot ==
In 2005, Otis Lort is a movie star who suffers from alcoholism. He crashes his car, gets into a drunken altercation with the police and is forced to go into rehabilitation.

Dr. Moreno, Otis' counselor, tells him that if he leaves the facility before they say he is ready, the court will send him to prison for his violent offenses. Moreno tells Otis that he has PTSD, which he denies repeatedly, but she encourages him to look into his past through exposure therapy.

Going back a decade earlier to 1995, Otis remembers working as a child actor. He was often accompanied on set by his father James, a former rodeo clown. While James has been sober for four years, he is manic, aggressive, and on edge. The two live in a meager motel complex, and a shy young woman lives across from them. Otis is in the Big Brother program at the behest of his mother, despite James's jealousy. Otis wants to go to a baseball game with Tom from the program, and James agrees to allow it if Tom comes over for a barbecue.

In 2005, Otis is shown communicating with his roommate Percy. He continues therapy, but resists the process, finding it unhelpful. Returning to his memories, Otis remembers that when Tom came over for a barbecue, James threw him into the pool and violently threatened him. When he is offered a part in a movie that will be shot in Canada, Otis calls his mother, who is unsure if James would be allowed to accompany him to Canada because of his status as a registered sex offender. In response, James begins screaming at her, and Otis has to relay his parents' arguments back and forth during the phone call.

In the present, Otis resists therapy yet again. Alec, another counselor, advises him to go into the woods and scream as loudly as he can. James is then shown attending an Alcoholics Anonymous meeting where he talks about his abusive stepmother, the beginnings of his substance abuse, and the fact that he attempted to rape a woman while he was blacked out; the attempted rape resulted in his registration as a sex offender. Alone in his room, Otis spends time with the Shy Girl; the two cuddle, and he gives her money. James forces Otis to rehearse his scenes over and over again, and he stops to scream at the neighbors for being too loud. Otis asks him to stop. He tells his father that no one else would hire him due to his status as a sex offender, adding that he (Otis) is actually in charge since James is making money off of him. In 2005, Otis thanks Alec for his advice and continues to work with Dr. Moreno on controlling his anger.

In 1995, Otis finally confronts James and tells him he needs to start being a better father. A furious James hits him, then leaves on his motorcycle to acquire drugs at a strip club. Alone, Otis spends time with the Shy Girl, and the two are caught waking up together the next morning by James. The Shy Girl slaps James and leaves. James asks Otis how he thinks it would feel to be criticized by his own son and to have to resort to accepting payment from him. Otis tells James that if he did not receive money, James would not be present.

James takes Otis to a patch of marijuana plants he has been growing near the highway and smokes cannabis with him. Back in the present, Otis revisits the motel and imagines himself finding his father there in his rodeo clown costume. He tells his father he intends to make a movie about him; James asks him to make him look good. The two ride away on James's motorcycle, but the image fades into Otis riding away alone.

== Cast ==
- Shia LaBeouf as James Lort
- Lucas Hedges as Otis Lort
  - Noah Jupe as young Otis Lort
- FKA Twigs as Shy Girl
- Maika Monroe as Sandra
- Natasha Lyonne as Mrs. Lort
- Martin Starr as Alec
- Byron Bowers as Percy
- Laura San Giacomo as Dr. Moreno
- Clifton Collins Jr. as Tom
- Graham Clark as TV Dad

== Production ==
LaBeouf based the script on his own life, with his character being based on his own father, and the title coming from his childhood nickname. LaBeouf wrote the script as a part of his rehabilitation program in Connecticut, where he was diagnosed with post-traumatic stress disorder, and his therapist encouraged him to write about his upbringing.

In March 2018, it was announced that Lucas Hedges and LaBeouf had joined the cast of the film, with Alma Har'el directing from a screenplay written by LaBeouf himself. Brian Kavanaugh-Jones, Daniela Taplin Lundberg, Christopher Leggett would produce the film under their Automatik, Stay Gold Features and Delirio Films banners, respectively. Fred Berger would serve as an executive producer. LaBeouf had shared the screenplay with Har'el, a friend and creative collaborator, who decided that she wanted to direct it. In April 2018, Noah Jupe joined the cast of the film. In May 2018, Clifton Collins Jr., Maika Monroe, Natasha Lyonne, Martin Starr, Byron Bowers and Laura San Giacomo joined the cast of the film. In June 2018, it was announced that FKA Twigs had joined the cast of the film.

Asked about how making a film based on his own life affected his rehab, LaBeouf said:

"It is strange to fetishize your pain and make a product out of it and feel guilty about that. It felt very selfish. This whole thing felt very selfish. I never went into this thinking, 'Oh, I am going to fucking help people.' That wasn't my goal. I was falling apart."

Production began in May 2018, in Los Angeles, California, lasting 19 days.

In August 2022, LaBeouf revealed that he had taken creative liberties with the character portrayal of his father and Honey Boy was not an autobiographical depiction of his childhood. He indicated that he had regrets about the abusive nature of the father character toward him in the film, when he actually was "...so loving to me my whole life. Fractured, sure. Crooked, sure. Wonky, for sure. But never was not loving, never was not there. He was always there... and I'd done a world press tour about how fucked he was as a man." LaBeouf stated that he called his father after the Honey Boy premiere and "took accountability for all of that and knew very clearly that I couldn't take it back."

== Release ==
The film had its world premiere at the Sundance Film Festival on January 25, 2019. Shortly after, Amazon Studios acquired distribution rights to the film and eventually released it on November 8, 2019.

== Reception ==
=== Box office ===
Honey Boy grossed $3 million in the United States and Canada, and $258,087 in other territories, for a worldwide total of $3.3 million, against a production budget of $3.5 million. The film made $301,075 from four theaters in its opening weekend, considered a "strong" start. It expanded to 17 theaters the following weekend, making $203,272.

=== Critical reception ===
On review aggregator Rotten Tomatoes, the film holds an approval rating of 95% based on 238 reviews, and an average rating of 7.7/10. The website's critical consensus reads, "Honey Boy serves as an act of cinematic therapy for its screenwriter and subject – one whose unique perspective should strike a chord in audiences from all backgrounds." On Metacritic, the film has a weighted average score of 73 out of 100, based on 41 critics, indicating "generally favorable" reviews.

A. A. Dowd of The A.V. Club wrote, "[A]s a glorified form of drama therapy, Honey Boy is fascinating".

Lindsey Bahr of Associated Press included Honey Boy as number seven on her list of the top 10 motion pictures of 2019.
