= Astra Film Award for Best Original Screenplay =

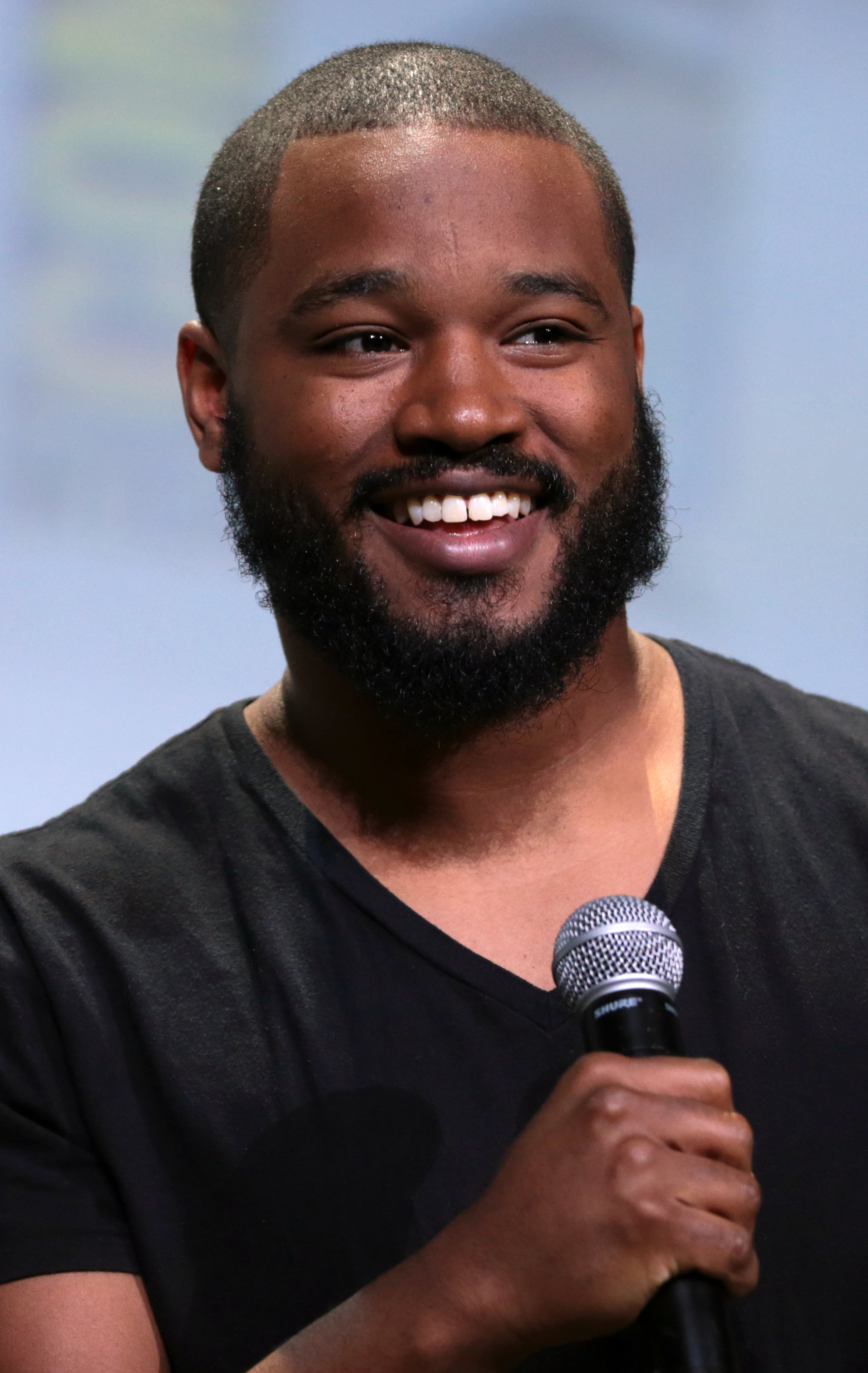
- The 2025 recipient: Ryan Coogler
- Awarded for: Best writing not based on pre-existing material
- Country: United States
- Presented by: Hollywood Creative Alliance
- First award: Jordan Peele (2017)
- Currently held by: Ryan Coogler; Sinners (2025)
- Website: hollywoodcreative.org

The Astra Film Award for Best Original Screenplay is one of the annual awards given out by the Hollywood Creative Alliance.

== Winners ==
=== 2010s ===
Year	Writer(s)	Film
2017	Jordan Peele	Get Out
2017	Emily V. Gordon and Kumail Nanjiani	The Big Sick
2017	Greta Gerwig	Lady Bird
2017	Guillermo del Toro and Vanessa Taylor	The Shape of Water
2017	Martin McDonagh	Three Billboards Outside Ebbing, Missouri
2018	Adam McKay	Vice
2018	Bo Burnham	Eighth Grade
2018	Tony McNamara and Deborah Davis	The Favourite
2018	Bryan Woods, Scott Beck, John Krasinski	A Quiet Place
2018	Boots Riley	Sorry to Bother You
2019	Bong Joon-ho and Han Jin-won	Parasite
2019	Emily Halpern, Sarah Haskins, Susanna Fogel, and Katie Silberman	Booksmart
2019	Lulu Wang	The Farewell
2019	Rian Johnson	Knives Out
2019	Noah Baumbach	Marriage Story

=== 2020s ===
Year	Writer(s)	Film
2020	Emerald Fennell	Promising Young Woman
2020	Lee Isaac Chung	Minari
2020	Andy Siara	Palm Springs
2020	Abraham Marder and Darius Marder	Sound of Metal
2020	Aaron Sorkin	The Trial of the Chicago 7
2021	Fran Kranz	Mass
2021	Aaron Sorkin	Being the Ricardos
2021	Kenneth Branagh	Belfast
2021	Zach Baylin	King Richard
2021	Edgar Wright	Last Night in Soho
2022	Daniel Kwan and Daniel Scheinert	Everything Everywhere All at Once
2022	Martin McDonagh	The Banshees of Inisherin
2022	Steven Spielberg and Tony Kushner	The Fabelmans
2022	Will Tracy	The Menu
2022	Todd Field	Tár
2023	Greta Gerwig and Noah Baumbach	Barbie
2023	Alex Convery	Air
2023	Justine Triet and Arthur Harari	Anatomy of a Fall
2023	David Hemingson	The Holdovers
2023	Celine Song	Past Lives
2023	Emerald Fennell	Saltburn
2024	Jesse Eisenberg	A Real Pain
2024	Sean Baker	Anora
2024	Brady Corbet and Mona Fastvold	The Brutalist
2024	Justin Kuritzkes	Challengers
2024	Gil Kenan and Jason Reitman	Saturday Night
2024	Coralie Fargeat	The Substance
2025	Ryan Coogler	Sinners
2025	Noah Baumbach and Emily Mortimer	Jay Kelly
2025	Ronald Bronstein and Josh Safdie	Marty Supreme
2025	Hikari	Rental Family
2025	Joachim Trier and Eskil Vogt	Sentimental Value
2025	Zach Cregger	Weapons
