= Katie Silberman =

American screenwriter and film producer

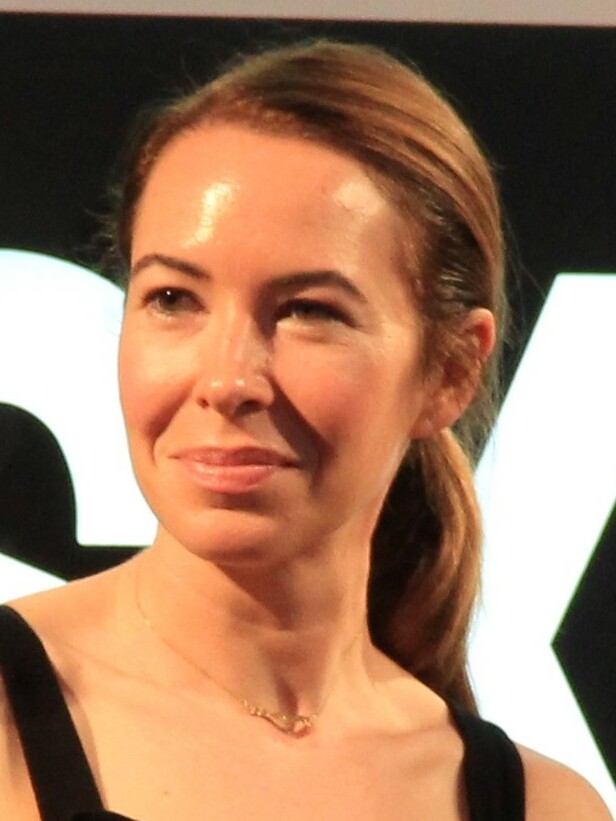
- Silberman in 2019
- Education: Dartmouth College (BA); Columbia University (MFA)
- Occupations: Screenwriter, film producer
- Years active: 2010–present

Katie Silberman is an American screenwriter and film producer. She is most known for writing the screenplays to Set It Up (2018), Booksmart (2019), and Don't Worry Darling (2022).

== Career ==
Silberman earned her BA from Dartmouth College and her Master of Fine Arts degree from Columbia University School of the Arts.

Silberman wrote the screenplay and served as a co-producer on romantic comedy film Set It Up, which appeared on the 2015 Black List. It was released in June 2018 by Netflix. Silberman co-wrote Isn't It Romantic alongside Dana Fox and Erin Cardillo, directed by Todd Strauss-Schulson.

In spring 2018, Silberman was hired to revise the screenplay for Booksmart, and to update the story; previous drafts had been written by Emily Halpern, Sarah Haskins and Susanna Fogel. Directed by Olivia Wilde, the film was released in 2019. Silberman, who also served as producer for the film, explored new concepts. She received a BAFTA Award for Best Original Screenplay nomination for the film.

Silberman wrote a draft of the 2021 film Tom and Jerry.

Silberman wrote and produced Don't Worry Darling, a 2022 psychological thriller film, also directed by Wilde. She is set to write and produce Most Dangerous Game for Netflix, and an untitled holiday comedy film directed by Wilde for Universal Pictures.

== Filmography ==
- Set It Up (2018)
- Isn't It Romantic (2019)
- Booksmart (2019)
- Don't Worry Darling (2022) (Also co-producer)
- Ladies First (2026)
