= Carol's Second Act =

American medical sitcom (2019–2020)

- Genre: Sitcom
- Created by: Emily Halpern; Sarah Haskins
- Starring: Patricia Heaton; Ito Aghayere; Lucas Neff; Jean-Luc Bilodeau; Sabrina Jalees; Ashley Tisdale; Kyle MacLachlan; Cedric Yarbrough
- Country of origin: United States
- Original language: English
- No. of seasons: 1
- No. of episodes: 18

Production
- Executive producers: Patricia Heaton; Emily Halpern; Sarah Haskins; Aaron Kaplan; Dana Honor; Rebecca Stay; Adam Griffin; David Hunt; Pamela Fryman
- Camera setup: Multi-camera
- Running time: 21–22 minutes
- Production companies: H+H; FourBoys Entertainment; Kapital Entertainment; CBS Television Studios

Original release
- Network: CBS
- Release: September 26, 2019 – March 12, 2020

Carol's Second Act is an American medical television sitcom created by Emily Halpern and Sarah Haskins, which aired from September 26, 2019, to March 12, 2020 on CBS. It stars Patricia Heaton along with Ito Aghayere, Lucas Neff, Jean-Luc Bilodeau, Sabrina Jalees, Ashley Tisdale, Kyle MacLachlan, and Cedric Yarbrough in supporting roles. In May 2020, the series was canceled after one season.

== Premise ==
After raising her two children and retiring from teaching, Carol Kenney embarks on a unique second act: pursuing her dream of becoming a doctor by completing medical school and beginning an internship at the Loyola Memorial Hospital.

== Cast ==
=== Main ===
- Patricia Heaton as Dr. Carol Kenney, the oldest member of the newest group of interns at Loyola Memorial Hospital. Carol is divorced and has two adult children. Before medical school, she used to be a high school science teacher. In the episode "Peer Evaluations", she states that she is in her early 50s.
- Ito Aghayere as Dr. Maya Jacobs, chief resident at Loyola Memorial with a reputation as a strict disciplinarian and perfectionist. She is in charge of Carol's intern group.
- Lucas Neff as Dr. Caleb Sommers, one of the members of Carol's group of interns who secretly feels he doesn't deserve his position due to having gotten in through family connections. He has a complicated relationship with his superior, Dr. Stephen Frost.
- Jean-Luc Bilodeau as Dr. Daniel Kutcher, another member of Carol's group of interns. He graduated from Harvard in 2014 and from Duke University School of Medicine in 2018 and has already been published in The New England Journal of Medicine—twice. Nevertheless, he is insecure and overly idealistic about his profession, seeking glory for himself often at the expense of his fellow interns.
- Sabrina Jalees as Dr. Lexie Gilani, another member of Carol's group of interns who is under immense pressure due to having been the first in her family to attend college. She has no patience for doctors who fail to take their jobs seriously.
- Ashley Tisdale as Jenny Kenney, Carol's big-hearted daughter who works as a pharmaceutical representative. Jenny loves and is supportive of Carol, and her practical and outgoing demeanor is a buoyant counterpoint to her mother's neurotic medical colleagues. Despite Carol having told him that Jenny is off-limits, Daniel has a crush on her.
- Kyle MacLachlan as Dr. Stephen Frost, senior attending physician and department chair at Loyola Memorial. He takes an immediate shine to Carol, in contrast to the more merciless Dr. Jacobs.
- Cedric Yarbrough as Nurse Dennis, the hospital's merciless nursing supervisor who insists on giving and receiving respect

=== Recurring ===
- Adam Rose as Jake, a nerdy doctor who most of the staff ignores
- Patrick Fabian as Dr. Victor Lewis, a transplant surgeon and Carol's love interest

=== Guest ===
- Camille Chen as Sharon, a patient's wife
- Carol Mansell as Mrs. Zahn, an elderly patient with a fever
- Matt Braunger as Gary, a patient with a fascinating and rare problem
- Larry VanBuren Jr. as Darrin Alexander, a celebrated college athlete
- Ben Kolyke as Coach Dean, Darrin's coach
- Essence Atkins as Kathleen, Darrin's mother
- Jane Kaczmarek as Phyllis, Carol's friend from her teaching days
- Alan Blumenfeld as Mr. Tuverson, an unpleasant and perverted patient of Carol's
- John Ross Bowie as Gordon, a patient who pretends to be sick to avoid his visiting in-laws
- Kerri Kenney as Nancy
- Marisa Davila as Harper
- Punam Patel as Dr. Mehta
- Scott Lawrence as Dr. Darnton
- Kausar Mohammed as Aisha
- Larry Joe Campbell as Eddie, a patient who is on the waiting list for a liver transplant
- Kelsey Grammer as Dr. Richard Kenney, Carol's ex-husband and Jenny's father

== Episodes ==
No.	Title	Directed by	Written by	Original release date	Prod. code	U.S. viewers (millions)
1	"Pilot"	Pamela Fryman	Emily Halpern & Sarah Haskins	September 26, 2019	CSA101	5.97
Following a difficult divorce, Dr. Carol Kenney reports for her first day at Loyola Memorial Hospital alongside her fellow interns Daniel Kutcher, Caleb Sommers, and Lexie Gilani. Carol immediately clashes with her supervisor, Dr. Maya Jacobs, who disapproves of her cheerful attitude and disregard for the hospital's strict hierarchy, and punishes her by assigning her to collect stool samples for the rest of the day. Lexie discovers that Caleb only became an intern after his family intervened, which offends her and they argue; Carol forces them to reconcile using her experience as a former teacher. Maya discovers that Daniel violated protocol by allowing Carol to speak to his patient about his test results, and commends her for handling difficult news well. Carol meets Dr. Stephen Frost, a senior physician at the hospital who takes a liking to her.
2	"You Give Me Fever"	Pamela Fryman	Emily Halpern & Sarah Haskins	October 3, 2019	CSA102	5.68
Carol is assigned her first patient: an elderly woman complaining of fevers. When no obvious problems show up in the patient's tests, Dr. Jacobs orders Carol to discharge the patient in accordance with hospital protocol. Instead, Carol defies her by exploiting a loophole to keep the patient for a few extra hours so she can run further tests, which turn up nothing. Daniel is tasked with drawing blood, which he keeps putting off until Lexie realizes that he doesn't know how. Dr. Frost arranges for Nurse Dennis to teach Daniel how to draw blood, which Lexie turns into a humiliating short video. Carol finds suspicious pills in her patient's bag, and has her daughter Jenny identify them, which allows her to determine that the patient has been prescribed the wrong kind of medicine. Dr. Jacobs then punishes her for insubordination by making her do additional paperwork.
3	"The Zebra"	Phill Lewis	John Blickstead & Trey Kollmer	October 10, 2019	CSA104	4.95
The hospital receives a potential "zebra", a patient with an extremely rare condition that will give the attending physician the chance to write an article for a medical journal. The interns take to fighting amongst themselves for the chance to treat the zebra, with Caleb and Lexie persuading Dr. Jacobs to assign Carol to another patient to better their odds. As it turns out, Carol's patient is the zebra, and she exacts revenge by refusing to let either of them assist her. Only when the patient suffers a near-fatal allergic reaction does she swallow her pride and let them help. Carol subsequently decides to let Caleb and Lexie co-author her article. Meanwhile, Daniel accidentally eats Dr. Jacobs' blueberry muffin and is forced to ask Nurse Dennis for a new one. In return, he has to dress up as a clown and entertain sick patients for the nurse's amusement.
4	"Marathon Day"	Pamela Fryman	Andy Roth	October 17, 2019	CSA105	5.08
Dr. Jacobs arrives late for work after running a marathon and collapses. Dr. Frost assigns Carol to be her attending physician while the rest of the interns are working on other injured marathon runners; Carol decides to take it as an opportunity to prove to Dr. Jacobs that she is deserving of her respect. Daniel and Lexie discover that Caleb has an irrational fear of feet, preventing him from helping them deal with the massive backlog of patients. They put him through exposure therapy, which allows him to overcome his fear. Carol finds that Dr. Jacobs is stubborn and refuses to take her advice or let her help, which she takes as a sign that Jacobs is unwilling to acknowledge her as a doctor. However, Dr. Jacobs explains that, being a black female physician, she has to hold herself to higher standards in order to be taken seriously. She then tells Carol that she does, in fact, respect her.
5	"The Nightfloat"	Pamela Fryman	Ari Berkowitz	October 24, 2019	CSA106	5.10
Carol has her first "night float", being the only physician on duty for the night. The position comes with enormous pressure, and having already been warned by Dr. Jacobs not to call her, she instead asks Dr. Frost to stay for a few extra hours to assist. Jenny takes the interns to a bar, and she and Daniel try to help Lexie and Caleb flirt with some single women; after they leave, Daniel admits to Jenny that he has a crush on her. Nurse Dennis informs Carol that she can't expect other doctors to bail her out on the night float, so she sends Dr. Frost home and attempts to finish the night herself, finally calling Dr. Jacobs when she suspects a patient has a rare heart condition and needs a second opinion. The other interns taunt Carol for "caving", but Dennis stands up for her, giving Carol a new-found level of respect from her peers.
6	"Game Changer"	Angela Barnes Gomes	Darrin Bragg	November 7, 2019	CSA107	5.00
Celebrity athlete Darrin Alexander is admitted to the hospital with a broken rib; tests reveal that he has a serious medical condition that could potentially cause his heart to give out at any second. As his doctor, Carol advises him to stop playing football, but Darrin, his coach, and even his mother support his decision to keep playing. Carol is furious that her advice has been disregarded, but Dr. Frost tells her that even if she can't force her patients to live perfectly healthy lives, her concern for them is what makes her a great doctor. Daniel pretends to have erectile dysfunction to help Jenny meet her quota for selling a new drug. Even though she had previously told him she didn't date doctors, she offers to take him out to dinner as a friend instead. When Carol asks why he lied, however, Daniel chooses not to tell her about their relationship.
7	"Dr. Mom"	Pamela Fryman	Becky Mann & Audra Sielaff	November 14, 2019	CSA103	4.74
Disgusted by the interns' poor hygiene and living habits, Dr. Jacobs tells them to improve. Carol then takes it upon herself to teach them how to be time-efficient while also cleaning up the lounge. The interns quickly shape up, but Carol's inability to stop mothering them prevents her from performing her duties, causing Jacobs to hand her latest patient off to Daniel. Frustrated, she winds up yelling at them and calling them "lazy filth people". Jenny steps in and tells her to treat them as her peers and not her children or her students, which allows for reconciliation. Jenny has her own problem: Dr. Frost refuses to prescribe any of her drugs due to his distaste for pharmaceutical representatives. To get around that, Jenny has Nurse Dennis argue that the prescribed drugs would also be beneficial for the staff, winning Dr. Frost over.
8	"Sick and Retired"	Pamela Fryman	Margee Magee	November 21, 2019	CSA109	4.87
Carol's friend Phyllis is admitted to Loyola after a fall. When they talk, Phyllis explains how happy she's been since she retired from teaching and discusses everything she's been doing, such as planning a trip to France. This causes Carol to reflect on her decision to jump into another career instead of retiring, as she begins to realize all the things she'll never be able to do because of the demands of her new profession. Daniel steals Caleb's idea for a diagnosis and presents it as his own to Dr. Jacobs. Caleb says he doesn't mind, leading Daniel to believe he's plotting revenge. As it turns out, Caleb is willing to be just as petty as him, but in a more strategic manner. Carol discovers that Phyllis has become an alcoholic to cope with the boredom of retirement, and accepts that she made the right choice after all.
9	"Therapy Dogs"	Katy Garretson	Broti Gupta	December 5, 2019	CSA108	4.70
The hospital brings in emotional support dogs to improve patient wellness. Lexie's intuition reveals a potentially fatal condition in a patient that can be corrected through surgery. Carol is adamant that Lexie be honored for saving someone's life, but Lexie refuses, saying she's too stressed out about having to make life or death decisions. Dr. Frost gives Caleb and Daniel one hour to diagnose Gordon, a man with no obvious symptoms. When they fail to do so, he reveals that Gordon has no illness--he's simply pretending so he can stay in the hospital away from his unpleasant in-laws. A dog goes missing, and Carol finds that Lexie stole him for comfort. The two talk, and Carol decides to arrange for the support dogs to be given to the doctors for the rest of the day. Caleb and Daniel catch Gordon trying to eat peanuts, which he's allergic to, and chase after him.
10	"Merry December 19th"	Scott Ellis	Becky Mann & Audra Sielaff	December 12, 2019	CSA110	5.01
With Jenny leaving to spend Christmas with her father on a cruise, Carol plans a party so they can share little Christmas time together. Unbeknownst to her, Jenny has been planning to have a date with Daniel before she departs, upsetting Carol as she feels that Jenny doesn't care about spending time with her anymore. Daniel's date night is thrown into disarray when an influx of patients with food poisoning are sent to Loyola and the doctors are assigned to find out if the illness can be contained or if it needs to be reported. While treating a teenage girl, Carol watches her make amends with her disappointed mother. Daniel tries to make things up to Jenny, but then decides to cancel the date so she has time to reconcile with her mother. Jenny then gives Carol a surprise: a gathering of the other doctors and staff for the Christmas party she planned.
11	"Blocking"	Kimberly McCullough	Emily Halpern & Sarah Haskins	January 9, 2020	CSA111	4.84
Carol's patient Amanda has serious complications from a UTI, so she asks for her to be transferred to Loyola's ICU. However, the department head, Dr. Mehta, refuses on the grounds that no beds are available. Nurse Dennis explains that this is "blocking", a way for doctors to turn away patients so they don't have to work extra hours. Outraged, Carol goes to Dr. Mehta to complain, only to be dismissed as a lowly intern. Upon seeing that there are plenty of beds, Carol impersonates a senior attending physician to get Amanda admitted, angering Dr. Mehta, but Dr. Jacobs defends her for doing the right thing. Elsewhere, Daniel and Jenny finally have their first date, but Daniel skips out to join Dr. Frost for cigars with a legendary heart surgeon before realizing his mistake and returning. Jenny tells him that she doesn't want to force him to choose between her and his career, so she breaks things off.
12	"Peer Evaluations"	Pamela Fryman	John Blickstead & Trey Kollmer	January 16, 2020	CSA112	4.97
The interns are called in for their mandatory peer evaluations. Both Caleb and Daniel are satisfied with theirs, but Lexie and Carol both receive some serious criticism: Lexie is chided for being emotionally distant from her patients while Carol is labeled "condescending". Carol is angered, and when she finds out Daniel was responsible, she goes out of her way to shame and insult him in retaliation. To help Lexie with her lack of empathy, Dr. Frost asks her to help a female patient who's refusing life-saving brain surgery. Lexie tries to connect with her patient but fails to do so until she decides to lie, telling the patient a fake story about how her grandmother died from refusing treatment. Daniel and Carol save a man's life by combining their observations; they talk things over and Carol recognizes that Daniel respects her, but wants to be treated with the same amount of respect in return.
13	"Night Lemons"	Pamela Fryman	Teleplay by : Emily Halpern & Sarah Haskins; Story by : Allison Gilbert	January 30, 2020	CSA113	4.60
While staying over at Carol's house for the night, Lexie notices her interact with her kind neighbor Jerry, and instantly realizes he has feelings for her; she tells Carol that her "marriage glasses" prevent her from forming romantic attachments and that she needs to consider dating. With encouragement from Lexie and Jenny, Carol confronts Jerry. After briefly denying any such feelings, Jerry reveals he's been obsessed with her for years, even planting a lemon tree just for her, which he then destroys when she rejects him. Dr. Frost becomes irritated with how reliant the hospital is on technology, and insists on teaching Caleb, Daniel, and Dr. Jacobs traditional diagnostic methods. Caleb is enthusiastic, but the others are dismissive. However, when Dr. Frost's techniques save a patient from an incorrect diagnosis, they accept that he may have a point. Carol decides to start dating again.
14	"Secrets"	Lee Shallat Chemel	Ari Berkowitz	February 6, 2020	CSA114	4.76
Carol learns from a patient, Eddie, that Lexie is secretly performing stand-up, and invites everyone to attend in a show of support; during her set, however, Lexie inadvertently reveals Jenny and Daniel's romantic past. Enraged that the group kept this a secret from her, Carol refuses to speak to any of them, even Jenny. Dr. Jacobs informs Caleb that an insurance claim for an injured woman has been denied, meaning she won't get the wheelchair she needs. After fruitlessly trying to contact the insurer for hours, Caleb gives up and resorts to taking money out of his trust fund to pay for the chair. Carol's friend gives her some perspective by revealing how much the hospital staff and patients love her, and so she forgives the group, content that at least Jenny isn't dating Daniel anymore. Unbeknownst to her, the two secretly make out after realizing they still have feelings for each other.
15	"Top of the List"	Michael Shea	Andy Roth	February 13, 2020	CSA115	4.83
Lexie discovers Dr. Jacobs has a tattoo of a duck on her abdomen and decides to find out why. Carol is forced to work with Dr. Lewis, a cold, unpleasant surgeon who is handling Eddie's liver transplant. He treats Carol more as an intern than a doctor, which annoys her. When he orders that she be removed from the case for being too "emotional", she confronts him. He then explains that he needs to be emotionally detached in order to perform his job properly, and she forgives him. Dr. Jacobs decides to have some fun with Lexie by telling her a long, rambling story about the tattoo and then smugly telling her it's all confidential under patient privacy rules (she had asked Lexie to check a mole) and so she can't tell anyone. The group notices at lunch that Dr. Lewis has developed a crush on Carol, and that she feels the same way.
16	"Carol's Crush"	Pamela Fryman	John Blickstead & Trey Kollmer	February 20, 2020	CSA116	4.70
Carol is excited to hear that Eddie's operation was a success. While talking with him, he urges her to go after Dr. Lewis if she truly loves him. The group offers her tips on flirting, but Carol proves to be too rusty when she tries and winds up embarrassing herself. A patient gives Caleb and Lexie a massage chair as a bribe in return for a forged doctor's note. Dr. Frost is upset when Caleb informs him, but secretly confiscates the chair for his own use after shaming them. While having dinner with Jenny, Carol gets a call from Dr. Lewis informing her that Eddie has passed away. Saddened by the feeling of having lost her first patient, she goes up to the roof for a quiet memorial and finds him doing the same thing. Dr. Lewis tells Carol that she's changed him for the better, and shows how much he truly cares by kissing her.
17	"Plus Ones"	Angela Barnes Gomes	Allison Gilbert & Asmita Paranjape	March 5, 2020	CSA117	4.68
Dr. Lewis invites Carol to a hospital fundraiser, which she accepts. At the event, however, her concerns that their relationship is moving too quickly crystallize when she learns he intends to place a bid on a beach house in Mexico, raising fears that he plans to propose to her. Carol resorts to lying to other guests to get them to outbid him; among them is Dr. Frost, who realizes he might also have feelings for her that he doesn't acknowledge because he thinks of Carol more as a trusted colleague. When the truth comes out, Dr. Lewis confesses to Carol that he feels their relationship is moving too slowly since she always invites him on dates, and he wants to change that. Dr. Jacobs, Lexie, and Caleb are forced to call in Daniel and a maintenance worker to help a "patient" with a curling iron stuck in her hair.
18	"R.I.P. Dr. Herman"	Scott Ellis	Becky Mann & Audra Sielaff	March 12, 2020	CSA118	5.23
Carol is selected to make a presentation to the senior doctors. However, her excitement is short-lived when Dr. Lewis suggests that she not present as he fears it will imperil his running for the newly vacant chief of staff position against Dr. Frost. Carol agrees, but realizes that she's tired of putting others' needs ahead of hers and breaks up with him, swearing off romantic relationships just as Dr. Frost works up the nerve to ask her out. Daniel struggles to find the perfect gift for Jenny's birthday, and Lexie points out that for once, he genuinely wants to make someone other than himself happy; Daniel admits that she's right, which Jenny overhears. Ultimately, everyone is shocked when Carol's ex-husband Richard (Kelsey Grammer) appears at the hospital with the news that he's the new chief of staff.

== Production ==
=== Development ===
On January 28, 2019, it was announced that CBS had given the production a pilot order. The pilot was written by Emily Halpern and Sarah Haskins, who also executive produce (along with Heaton, Aaron Kaplan and David Hunt). Production companies involved with the pilot include FourBoys Entertainment, Kapital Entertainment and CBS Television Studios. On February 12, 2019, it was announced that Pamela Fryman would direct the pilot.

On May 6, 2019, it was announced that the production had been given a series order. The next day, it was announced that the series would premiere that fall, and air Thursday nights during the 2019–2020 television season.

The series debuted on September 26, 2019. On October 22, 2019, it received a back order of five episodes. On May 6, 2020, CBS canceled the series after one season.

=== Casting ===
In March 2019, it was announced that Bonnie Dennison, Ito Aghayere, Kyle MacLachlan and Jean-Luc Bilodeau had been cast in the pilot's lead roles. On June 7, 2019, it was announced that Ashley Tisdale had replaced Dennison in the role of Jenny. On November 5, 2019, Cedric Yarbrough was promoted to series regular.

=== Sexual harassment allegations ===
In October 2019, two female writers alleged sexual harassment by executive producer David Hunt. After their internal complaints to CBS, they said, the writers' access to the set and the showrunners, including Hunt, was limited. Believing this to be retaliation for their complaints, they left the show. Hunt was required to watch a training video although he denied any inappropriate contact with either woman; the producers also say the restrictions on the writers had been planned before they were aware of the women's complaints.

=== Filming ===
Carol's Second Act was filmed at Radford Studio Center in Studio City, California, but it is set in Los Angeles, California.

== Release ==
=== Marketing ===
On May 15, 2019, CBS released the first official trailer for the series.

== Reception ==
=== Critical response ===
The review aggregator website Rotten Tomatoes reported a 58% approval rating with an average rating of 5.63/10, based on 12 reviews. The website's critical consensus reads, "While Carol's Second Act earns high marks for bringing Patricia Heaton front and center, awkward plotting and lackluster jokes hold it back from living up to its star's high standards." Metacritic, which uses a weighted average, assigned a score of 61 out of 100 based on 10 critics, indicating "generally favorable reviews".

=== Ratings ===
Viewership and ratings per episode of Carol's Second Act
No.	Title	Air date	Rating/share (18–49)	Viewers (millions)	DVR (18–49)	DVR viewers (millions)	Total (18–49)	Total viewers (millions)
1	"Pilot"	September 26, 2019	0.7/4	5.97	0.5	2.41	1.2	8.38
2	"You Give Me Fever"	October 3, 2019	0.7/3	5.68	0.4	2.02	1.1	7.71
3	"The Zebra"	October 10, 2019	0.6/3	4.95	0.4	1.79	1.0	6.75
4	"Marathon Day"	October 17, 2019	0.7/3	5.08	0.3	1.64	1.0	6.73
5	"The Nightfloat"	October 24, 2019	0.7/3	5.10	0.3	1.54	1.0	6.64
6	"Game Changer"	November 7, 2019	0.7/3	5.00	0.3	1.60	1.0	6.60
7	"Dr. Mom"	November 14, 2019	0.6/3	4.74	—N/a	1.45	—N/a	6.19
8	"Sick and Retired"	November 21, 2019	0.6/3	4.87	—N/a	1.51	—N/a	6.39
9	"Therapy Dogs"	December 5, 2019	0.6/3	4.70	0.3	1.49	0.9	6.19
10	"Merry December 19th"	December 12, 2019	0.6/3	5.01	0.3	1.44	0.9	6.46
11	"Blocking"	January 9, 2020	0.6/3	4.84	—N/a	1.62	—N/a	6.46
12	"Peer Evaluations"	January 16, 2020	0.6/3	4.97	—N/a	1.58	—N/a	6.55
13	"Night Lemons"	January 30, 2020	0.6/3	4.60	—N/a	1.59	—N/a	6.20
14	"Secrets"	February 6, 2020	0.5	4.76	0.3	1.43	0.8	6.20
15	"Top of the List"	February 13, 2020	0.6	4.83	—N/a	1.46	—N/a	6.29
16	"Carol's Crush"	February 20, 2020	0.6	4.70	—N/a	1.43	—N/a	6.14
17	"Plus Ones"	March 5, 2020	0.6	4.68	—N/a	1.46	—N/a	6.14
18	"RIP Dr. Herman"	March 12, 2020	0.7	5.23	—N/a	1.45	—N/a	6.69

== Home media ==
The complete series of Carol's Second Act was released on DVD on November 17, 2020, via Amazon.
