= 80 for Brady =

2023 film by Kyle Marvin

- Theatrical release poster
- Directed by: Kyle Marvin
- Written by: Sarah Haskins; Emily Halpern
- Produced by: Tom Brady; Donna Gigliotti
- Starring: Lily Tomlin; Jane Fonda; Rita Moreno; Sally Field; Tom Brady
- Cinematography: John Toll
- Edited by: Colin Patton
- Music by: John Debney
- Production companies: 199 Productions; Fifth Season; Watch This Ready
- Distributed by: Paramount Pictures
- Release date: February 3, 2023
- Running time: 98 minutes
- Country: United States
- Language: English
- Budget: $28 million
- Box office: $40.4 million

80 for Brady is a 2023 American sports comedy film directed by Kyle Marvin in his directorial debut from a screenplay by Sarah Haskins and Emily Halpern, and produced by former NFL quarterback Tom Brady. Inspired by a true story, it focuses on four lifelong friends (played by Lily Tomlin, Jane Fonda, Rita Moreno, and Sally Field) who travel to watch Brady and his New England Patriots play in Super Bowl LI in 2017. Billy Porter, Rob Corddry, Alex Moffat, and Guy Fieri also star.

80 for Brady was released theatrically in the United States on February 3, 2023, by Paramount Pictures. It received mixed reviews from critics, and grossed $40 million worldwide against a $28 million budget.

== Plot ==
Elderly best friends Lou, Trish, Maura, and Betty have been massive fans of the New England Patriots, particularly the team's star quarterback Tom Brady, since 2001, when Lou successfully completed chemotherapy. In 2017, the four women are celebrating the Patriots' victory over the Pittsburgh Steelers in the AFC Championship Game and make plans for the Super Bowl LI watch party.

The friends enter a competition for free tickets to the Super Bowl in Houston by sharing the stories of their Patriots fandom; Lou later announces their win and they prepare for their trip. On the day of their flight, the others break a sleeping Maura out of her retirement home (she had accidentally taken the wrong medication) with help from her fellow resident, Mickey.

In Houston, they go to the Super Bowl Experience, where Betty wins a chicken wing eating contest hosted by Guy Fieri, but loses the tickets. Trish meets former NFL player Dan O'Callahan and they are mutually attracted, but she is uncertain as she has not had a very successful love life. He invites her to a party, and the women decide to go upon learning about the loss of the tickets, as Fieri will also be there.

At the party, the women are given cannabis edibles which severely disorient them. Maura joins in on a game of poker in order to potentially buy new tickets, only to learn that the game is for charity; she gives her winnings to the charity of her top competitor, Gugu. Unable to find Fieri, the foursome return to their hotel.

The next day, the women go back to the Super Bowl Experience but find it has closed down. They then go to the tailgate parties around NRG Stadium to see if they can buy scalped tickets, but cannot afford them. Trish finds the radio hosts they won the tickets from and brings up the situation to them, but they are confused as they gave their tickets to a different group.

Betty finds Fieri at the tailgate and recovers the bag with the tickets but when the women attempt to enter the stadium, the security guards reveal that the tickets are fake. Lou confesses that she bought the "tickets" online for an exorbitant price, as she wanted to have one last fun memory with her friends as she fears that her cancer may have returned.

The other women console her and agree that even if they could not make it into the game, they are satisfied with all of their other memories. They run into Gugu, who sneaks them in under the guise of being backup dancers for Lady Gaga's halftime performance out of gratitude for Maura's actions the previous night.

They then run into Dan who invites them into his box suite as his guests. Concerned as they watch the Atlanta Falcons build a 28–3 lead over the Patriots, they sneak into the Patriots coordinators' booth. Betty hijacks the defensive coordinator's headset and gives him a playcall which leads to a sack, while Lou talks to Brady and gives him an inspirational message.

The four return to their box suite and watch as Brady leads the Patriots to a victory. Maura reveals she made back the money Lou spent on the fake tickets by making a bet on the Patriots winning with the suite owner. The women are approached by security and escorted to the Patriots' locker room, and then thanked by the players for their dedication.

Three years later, Trish, Maura, Betty, and Lou, along with Mickey, and Lou's daughter Sara, prepare to watch Brady's first game with his new team the Tampa Bay Buccaneers, and it is revealed that Lou is in good health. (Note: Brady and the Buccaneers would lose to the New Orleans Saints in that game, but still went on to win Super Bowl LV that season.) Sometime later, the four women sit on a beach with Brady discussing their retirements. (Note: Brady announced his retirement from the NFL on February 1, 2023.)

== Cast ==
- Lily Tomlin as Lou
- Jane Fonda as Trish
- Rita Moreno as Maura
- Sally Field as Betty
- Tom Brady as himself
- Billy Porter as Gugu
- Rob Corddry as Pat
- Alex Moffat as Nat
- Guy Fieri as himself
- Harry Hamlin as Dan
- Bob Balaban as Mark
- Glynn Turman as Mickey
- Sara Gilbert as Sara
- Jimmy O. Yang as Tony
- Ron Funches as Chip
- Matt Lauria as James
- Sally Kirkland as Ida
- Andy Richter as Clark
- Gus Kenworthy as Erik
- Brian Jordan Alvarez as Derek
- Marshawn Lynch as himself
- Patton Oswalt as Brisket
- Retta as herself
- Amber Chardae Robinson as Hot Wings Woman

Brady's former Patriots teammates Danny Amendola, Julian Edelman, and Rob Gronkowski have cameo appearances as themselves.

== Production ==
It was announced in February 2022 that Tom Brady, then recently retired for the first time from his football career, would produce and appear in the film, to be directed and cowritten by Kyle Marvin. The film is inspired by a real-life group of Patriots fans known as the "Over 80 for Brady" club; the grandson of one member pitched the idea for a film. Lily Tomlin, Jane Fonda, Rita Moreno and Sally Field also joined the cast. In March, Sara Gilbert, Glynn Turman, Bob Balaban, Ron Funches, Jimmy O. Yang and Harry Hamlin were added to the cast. That same month, Brady reversed his decision to retire from the NFL, although he eventually retired for good in February 2023. Marvin said that the announcement was "certainly news to us, so we had to adapt".

Filming began by March 2022, with the production receiving a tax credit to film in California. In June, filming wrapped, with Billy Porter and Guy Fieri added to the cast. By July 14, 2022, former Patriots Rob Gronkowski, Danny Amendola and Julian Edelman were announced as having had joined the film.

== Music ==
The film's score was composed by John Debney in November 2022. The soundtrack single "Gonna Be You" was released January 20, 2023. The song was written by Diane Warren, and performed by Dolly Parton, Belinda Carlisle, Cyndi Lauper, Debbie Harry and Gloria Estefan. The official music video shows Parton, Carlisle, Lauper, and Estefan performing while wearing football jerseys similar to the ones worn by the women in the film, interspersed with clips from the film. The official Debney's score album for the film was released on February 9, 2023, by Paramount Music.

Tracks on the soundtrack include "Get Down on It" by Kool and the Gang, "Too Tight" by Con Funk Shun, "Bra" by Cymande, "Come On and Get It" by The Steppers, "Frogtown Funk" by Bijan OIia, Aleksi Glick, and Jeffrey Koch, and "It's My House" by Diana Ross.

== Release ==
80 for Brady was released in theaters on February 3, 2023, by Paramount Pictures. Two days before the film's release, Brady announced his retirement from the NFL after 23 seasons.

=== Home media ===
80 for Brady was released for VOD on March 7, 2023, followed with a Blu-ray and DVD release by Paramount Home Entertainment on May 2, 2023.

== Reception ==
=== Box office ===
In the United States and Canada, 80 for Brady was released alongside Knock at the Cabin, and was projected to gross around $10 million from 3,912 theaters in its opening weekend. The film made $4.7 million on its first day, which includes $1.3 million from previews on Tuesday, Wednesday, and Thursday leading up to its release. It went on to debut to $12.5 million, finishing second behind Knock at the Cabin, though it actually sold more tickets, 1.3 million to 1.1 million. Of the opening weekend audience, 47% were over the age of 55 and 69% were women, with much of the sales coming from matinee showtimes. The film made $6 million in its second weekend (a drop of 53%), finishing fourth.

=== Critical response ===
On the review aggregator website Rotten Tomatoes, 59% of 135 critics' reviews are positive, with an average rating of 5.5/10. The website's consensus reads: "The titular QB may have been tough to beat on the gridiron, but on the big screen, it's 80 for Brady's veteran leading ladies who make this lightweight comedy a fitfully winsome watch." Metacritic, which uses a weighted average, assigned the film a score of 52 out of 100, based on 35 critics, indicating "mixed or average" reviews. Audiences surveyed by CinemaScore gave the film an average grade of "A–" on an A+ to F scale, while those polled by PostTrak gave it an 85% positive score, with 68% saying they would definitely recommend it.

== See also ==
- List of American football films
