= Don't Worry Darling =

2022 film by Olivia Wilde

- Theatrical release poster
- Directed by: Olivia Wilde
- Screenplay by: Katie Silberman
- Story by: Carey Van Dyke; Shane Van Dyke
- Produced by: Olivia Wilde; Katie Silberman; Miri Yoon; Roy Lee
- Starring: Florence Pugh; Harry Styles; Olivia Wilde; Gemma Chan; KiKi Layne; Nick Kroll; Chris Pine
- Cinematography: Matthew Libatique
- Edited by: Affonso Gonçalves
- Music by: John Powell
- Production companies: New Line Cinema; Vertigo Entertainment
- Distributed by: Warner Bros. Pictures
- Release dates: September 5, 2022 (Venice); September 23, 2022 (United States)
- Running time: 123 minutes
- Country: United States
- Language: English
- Budget: $20–35 million
- Box office: $87.6 million

Don't Worry Darling is a 2022 American psychological thriller film directed by Olivia Wilde from a screenplay by Katie Silberman, based on a spec script by brothers Carey Van Dyke and Shane Van Dyke. Starring Florence Pugh, Harry Styles, Wilde, Gemma Chan, KiKi Layne, Nick Kroll, and Chris Pine, it follows a housewife in an idyllic company town who begins to suspect a sinister secret being kept from its residents by the man who runs it.

Following the critical success of Wilde's feature directorial debut Booksmart (2019), a multi-studio bidding war took place for her second film, with New Line Cinema eventually winning. Pugh joined the cast in April 2020, with Styles added that September, replacing Shia LaBeouf after production had already begun. Filming took place in Los Angeles from October 2020 to February 2021. The film was the subject of media attention and controversy, including conflicting reports regarding the circumstances of LaBeouf's departure and alleged conflicts between Wilde and Pugh.

Don't Worry Darling premiered at the 79th Venice International Film Festival on September 5, 2022, and was theatrically released in the United States on September 23 by Warner Bros. Pictures. It received mixed reviews from critics and grossed $87.6 million.

== Plot ==
Alice and Jack Chambers live in Victory, California, an idyllic 1950s desert company town. Every day, the men leave for work at Victory Headquarters in the surrounding desert, and their wives enjoy luxuries and leisure while the men are gone. Alice spends her days with other wives, including her best friend, Bunny. Fellow resident Margaret has become estranged from the community. An unauthorized desert visit resulted in her son's apparent death, which caused her mental breakdown. Margaret insists that Victory took him as punishment for breaking the rules.

Victory's founder, Frank, hosts a party, during which Alice sees Margaret's husband attempt to medicate her after an outburst. Alice and Jack then have sex in Frank's home as Frank watches unbeknownst to Jack. From the trolley, Alice sees a plane crash in the desert, so she rushes to help. Stumbling onto Headquarters, she touches one of its mirror-like windows, experiencing surreal hallucinations about another life, waking up at home that night.

Alice continues to have increasingly strange experiences or hallucinations. Soon after, she sees Margaret slit her own throat and fall from her roof. Men in red jumpsuits drag Alice away, preventing her from reaching Margaret's body. Jack dismisses Alice's claims, insisting Margaret is simply recovering from a household accident. When Alice asks him what is really happening at the Victory Project, he becomes angry and refuses to answer. The town physician, Dr. Collins, prescribes medication to Alice, which she and Jack decline. She steals Margaret's medical file from his briefcase and finds it heavily redacted.

Becoming increasingly paranoid during a company celebration promoting Jack, Alice breaks down in the bathroom. Confronted by Bunny, she attempts to explain her suspicions. Bunny reacts angrily when Alice tells her she went to Headquarters, accusing her of jeopardizing their livelihood in Victory, like Margaret. Alice and Jack invite neighbors to dinner, including Frank and his wife, Shelley. Frank privately confirms her suspicions and dares her to challenge him. So, Alice attempts to expose him, but he makes her appear delusional to everyone, causing Jack grief.

Afterwards, Alice tries to tell Jack what Frank said, but he rebukes her. Desperate, she begs him to leave Victory with her. He feigns agreement, then lets Frank's men take her away. Dr. Collins gives Alice electroconvulsive therapy, during which she sees herself in the 21st century, as surgical resident Alice Warren, living with the unemployed Jack. After treatment, Alice resumes her life in Victory, but soon deduces the visions are actually memories. Confronted by Alice, Jack confesses the truth: Victory is a simulated world created by Frank, where he and the other men lead their version of perfect lives; the women they have in the simulation are unaware that everything in Victory, including their children, is artificial.

When the men leave for work each day, they actually log out of the simulation for real jobs to pay for their wives to stay there. Jack argues that Alice was miserable in the real world, while here they can finally be happy. However, Alice is livid that she is there. Jack begs Alice to stay, forcefully grabbing her, prompting her to smash a whiskey tumbler over his head, killing him in both the simulation and reality. Frank immediately hears of Jack's death. Bunny finds Alice and admits she has always known about the simulation, but chose to stay to be with her children, who died in real life. She warns Alice that she will be killed if she does not get to Headquarters, the simulation's exit portal. Alice silently confronts the neighborhood, and as small explosions begin, the husbands panic.

Fleeing by car, Alice is chased by Dr. Collins and Frank's men. She maneuvers them into fatally crashing into each other. Meanwhile, Shelley fatally stabs Frank to take control of Victory. Arriving at Headquarters, Alice has a final vision of Jack, then puts her hands on Headquarters before Frank's men can reach her. Various romantic scenes mixed with memories and visions of herself in the real world flash, then the screen cuts to black as Alice gasps for air.

== Cast ==
- Florence Pugh as Alice Warren-Chambers
- Harry Styles as Jack Chambers, Alice's husband
- Olivia Wilde as Bunny, Alice's neighbor and best friend
- Gemma Chan as Shelley
- KiKi Layne as Margaret
- Sydney Chandler as Violet
- Nick Kroll as Dean
- Chris Pine as Frank
- Kate Berlant as Peg
- Timothy Simons as Dr. Collins
- Douglas Smith as Bill
- Ari'el Stachel as Ted
- Dita Von Teese as herself

== Production ==
=== Development and writing ===
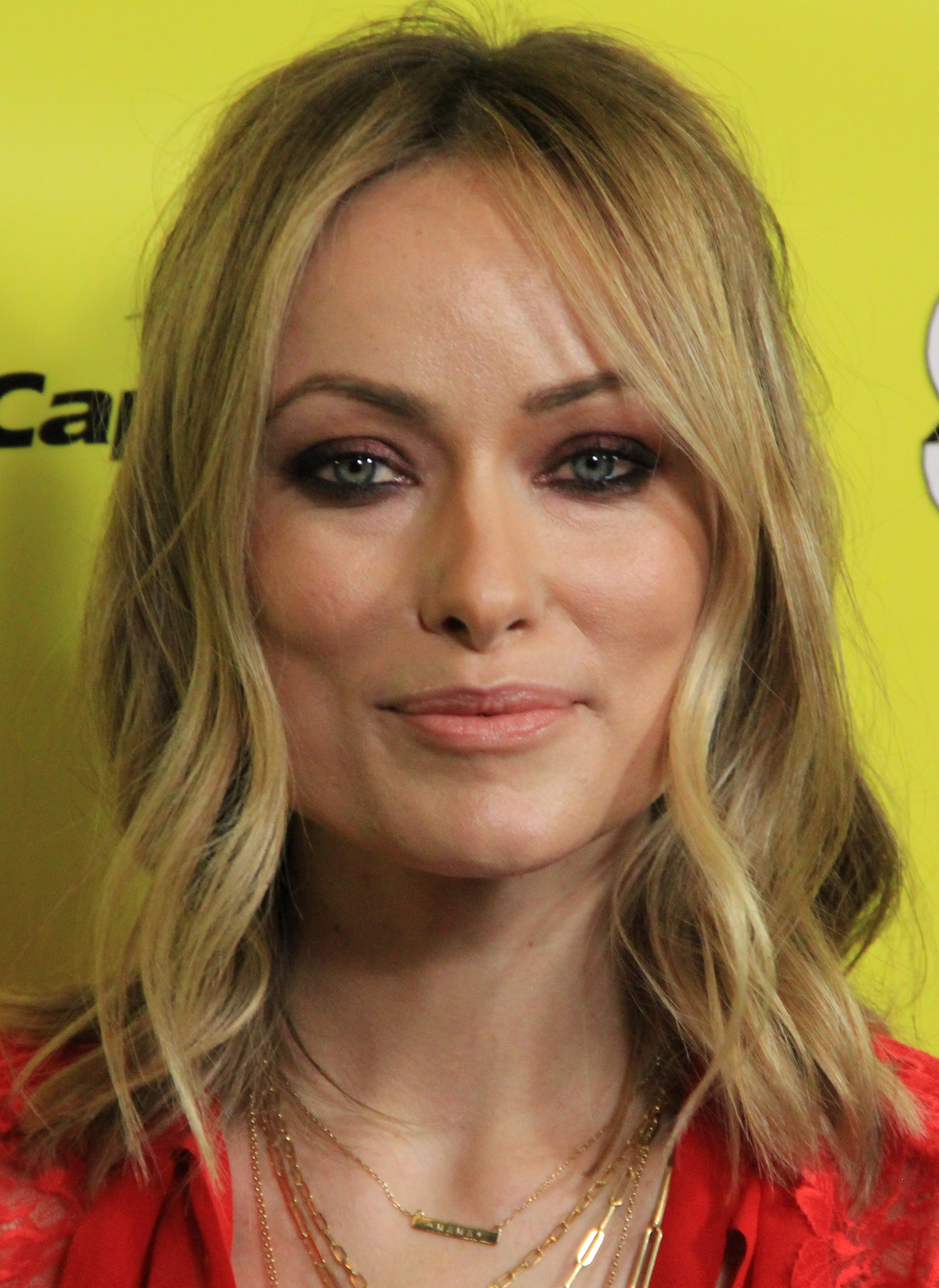
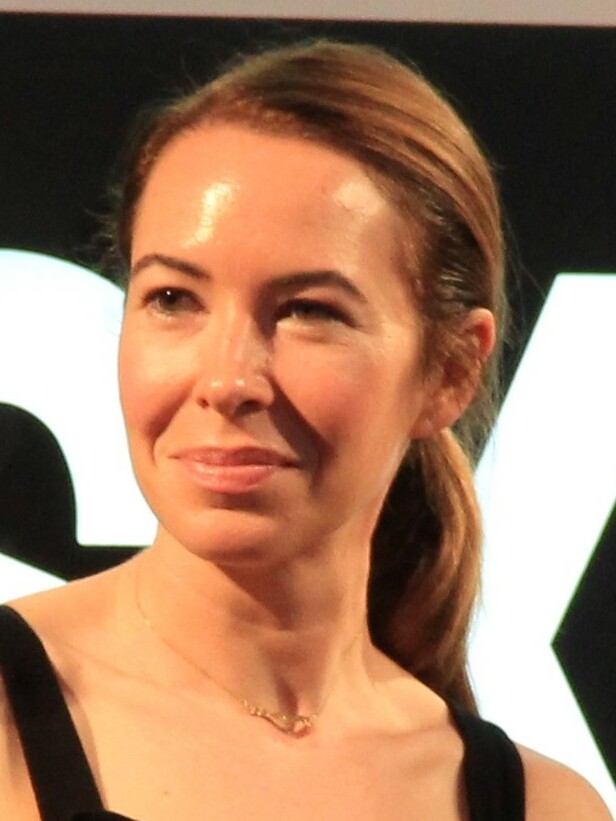
Olivia Wilde (left), the film's director and co-producer (who also plays Bunny), and Katie Silberman, the film's screenwriter

The film was announced in August 2019, after a bidding war among 18 studios to acquire the next Olivia Wilde-directed project. New Line Cinema won the auction. The original spec script was written by brothers Carey and Shane Van Dyke; the screenplay appeared on the 2019 Black List. Katie Silberman was brought on to do a rewrite, which became the film's screenplay. According to Wilde, Frank is inspired by psychologist and author Jordan Peterson, whom she called a "pseudo-intellectual hero to the incel community". Peterson rejected being characterized as an incelosphere-figurehead, but expressed interest and said that perhaps he would watch the film.

Variety initially put the budget at about $20 million, while Forbes estimated the production budget was in the range of $20–30 million. Variety and Deadline Hollywood later said the film cost $35 million to produce.

=== Casting ===
In April 2020, Florence Pugh, Shia LaBeouf and Chris Pine were added to the cast of the film, with Dakota Johnson joining the next month. Wilde was originally set to play Pugh's part and Pugh was to play Wilde's, but they traded roles when Wilde decided she wanted a younger couple at the center of the film. In September 2020, Harry Styles joined the cast, replacing LaBeouf.

In October 2020, Gemma Chan and KiKi Layne joined the cast, with Layne replacing Johnson, who dropped out due to a scheduling conflict with The Lost Daughter. That month, Sydney Chandler, Nick Kroll, Douglas Smith, Kate Berlant, Asif Ali, Timothy Simons and Ari'el Stachel joined the cast.

=== Filming ===
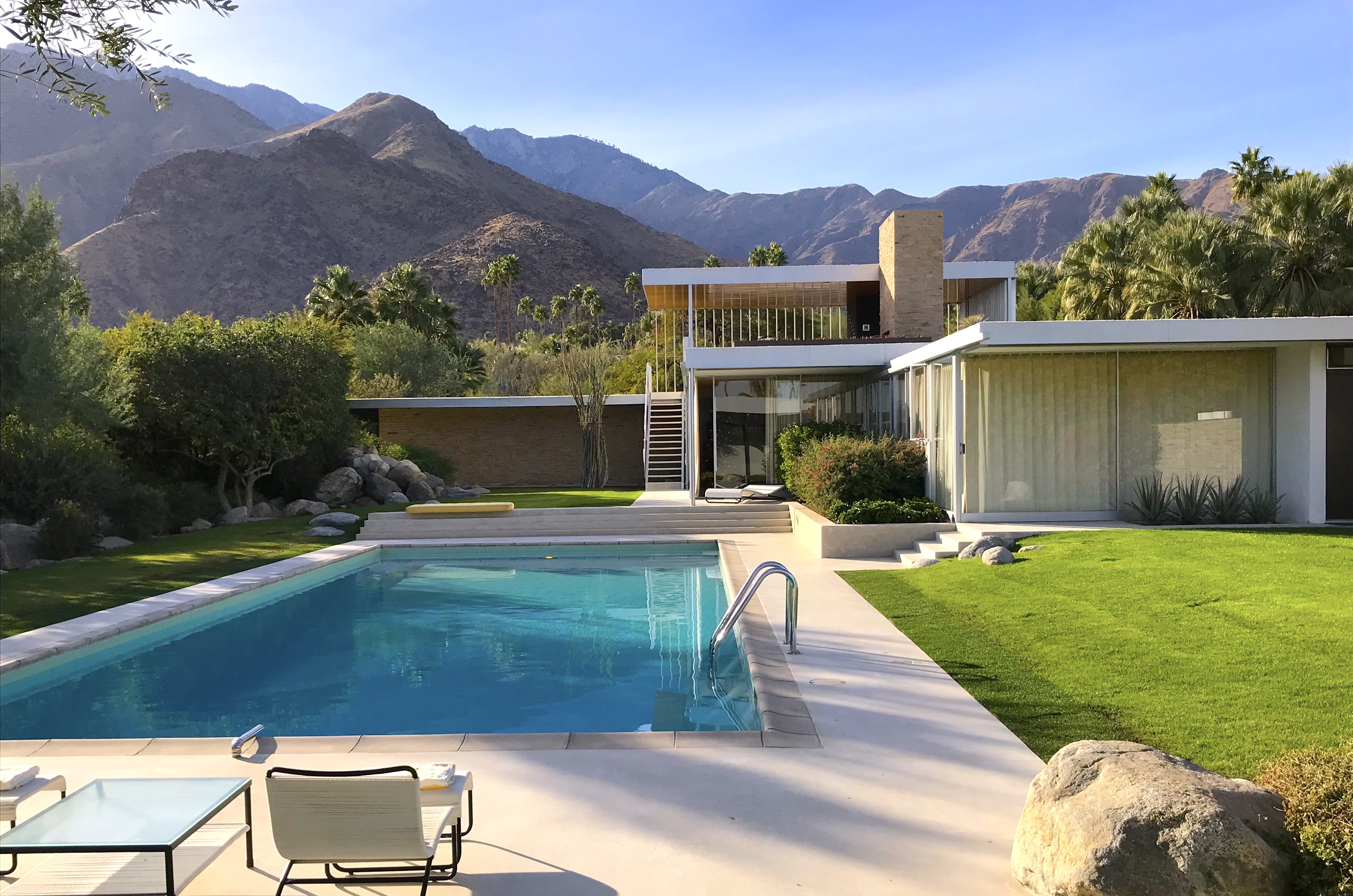
The opening scene was filmed at The Kaufmann House in Palm Springs.

Principal photography began in Los Angeles on October 26, 2020. It was temporarily halted for two weeks on November 4 after a crew member tested positive for COVID-19, which resulted in stars Pugh, Styles and Pine being quarantined. Filming wrapped on February 13, 2021. The film's original score is by John Powell. Arianne Phillips served as costume designer.

The opening sequence was filmed at the Kaufmann House. It was the first film to be shot there. Wilde was inspired by its architecture, and hung a photograph of it on her wall while working on the script. She told Variety, "To be there was huge. To direct the first shot there felt like this really auspicious beginning to this movie which was this love letter not only to film, but to architecture, to design, to this era."

Other filming locations include the Cicada Club in Downtown Los Angeles during the Victory party sequence and the Volcano House, in Newberry Springs, which served as Victory Headquarters and was once owned by TV host Huell Howser.

== Alleged on-set conflicts ==
=== Wilde and LaBeouf ===
In 2021, it was reported that Wilde had fired LaBeouf for poor behavior and clashing with the cast and crew. LaBeouf denied these claims in August 2022, saying he quit the film despite Wilde's efforts to keep him on board. He provided Variety with leaked texts and a video recording from Wilde addressed to him, in which she says: "I feel like I'm not ready to give up on this yet, and I, too, am heartbroken and I want to figure this out. You know, I think this might be a bit of a wake-up call for Miss Flo, and I want to know if you're open to giving this a shot with me, with us."

Following LaBeouf's statements, Wilde denied his claims and again said that she fired him, telling Vanity Fair that she did so after Pugh said she was uncomfortable with LaBeouf's behavior. When asked about this in an interview with The Hollywood Reporter, LaBeouf replied, "It is what it is."

=== Wilde and Pugh ===
Rumors alleged that Wilde and Pugh clashed on set, leading to tensions during both production and promotion for the film. An anonymous source reported to Vulture that Pugh and Wilde had a "screaming match" on set, and the former Warner Bros. executive Toby Emmerich oversaw a "long negotiation process" between Wilde, Pugh, and the studio to figure out how much Pugh would continue to be involved in the film. Warner Bros. co-chairs and CEOs Michael De Luca and Pam Abdy denied any tension between themselves and Wilde, saying, "We are so proud of the work that Olivia Wilde has done making this incredibly beautiful and entertaining film and look forward to collaborating with her again." On September 25, 2022, 40 members of the film's crew issued a statement disputing the allegations and dismissing rumors of unprofessional behavior on the set as "completely untrue". The allegations have also been dismissed by cinematographer Matthew Libatique, who called the set "one of the most harmonious sets I've ever been on", and by Wilde herself, who called the rumors "baseless".

== Marketing ==
At the CinemaCon 2022 for the stage at Caesars Palace, Wilde confirmed that the idea of the film was inspired by Inception, The Matrix, and The Truman Show. The trailer, which was also shown at CinemaCon, was released online on May 2, 2022. A teaser poster was released on June 16, and a second trailer was released on July 21.

David Christopherson of MovieWeb called the poster "unsettling," and based on the trailer, Valerie Ettenhofer of /Film said Don't Worry Darling looks like a "full-blown horror movie", noting the mystery surrounding its plot and The Stepford Wives overtones. The official release poster was released on August 11, 2022. An edited version of the second trailer was shown in theaters and was released online on September 21.

== Release ==
Don't Worry Darling had its world premiere at the 79th Venice International Film Festival on September 5, 2022. Claims of Styles spitting on Pine during the Venice premiere based on videos recorded from inside the theatre (and thereby adding to the already rocky press tour mired by allegations of a falling-out between Wilde and Pugh) were dismissed as "a ridiculous story" and "a complete fabrication" by Pine's representative. The film also screened at the 48th Deauville American Film Festival and the 70th San Sebastián International Film Festival. It was theatrically released on September 23, 2022.

The film was released for VOD on October 25, 2022, and on Ultra HD Blu-ray, Blu-ray DVD on November 29. It began streaming to subscribers on HBO Max on November 7. Over its first week of streaming, it was watched in 2.7 million households.

== Reception ==
=== Box office ===
Don't Worry Darling grossed $45.3 million in the U.S. and Canada, and $42.3 million in other territories, for a worldwide total of $87.6 million.

In the U.S. and Canada, it was projected to gross $17–20 million from 4,113 theaters in its opening weekend, with some estimates as high as $25 million. It made $9.4 million on its first day, including a combined $3.1 million from preview screenings on Monday and Thursday. It went on to debut to $19.4 million, topping the box office; 66% of the audience was female, with nearly 70% aged 18–34. Several publications noted the film was front-loaded to Friday and previews, attributing it likely to younger women going to see Styles. In its sophomore weekend the film fell 64.6% to $6.8 million, finishing second behind newcomer Smile.

=== Critical response ===
On the review aggregator website Rotten Tomatoes, the film has an approval rating of 38% based on 359 reviews. The website's critics consensus reads, "Despite an intriguing array of talent on either side of the camera, Don't Worry Darling is a mostly muddled rehash of overly familiar themes." Metacritic gave the film a weighted average score of 48 out of 100 based on 62 critics, indicating "mixed or average" reviews. Audiences polled by CinemaScore gave the film an average grade of "B−" on an A+ to F scale, while those at PostTrak gave the film a 67% overall positive score, with 53% saying they would definitely recommend it.

Critics praised Pugh's performance, the cinematography, and the visual style, but found the film unsatisfying overall. Rotten Tomatoes reported that Styles had "a debatably entertaining turn" and that reaction to the third act was divided. Reviewing the film after its Venice premiere, Kate Erbland of IndieWire praised the scenography and cast performances, particularly Pugh's, but found fault with the screenplay, summarizing: "Pugh's outstanding performance and the extraordinary below-the-line craftsmanship are all impeccably rendered, but they can't overcome the film's rotten core concept." In a mixed review for The A.V. Club, Tomris Laffly commended Pugh's performance and also praised Pine's performance and the film's visuals, but called Styles "outmatched", criticized the direction, and found its handling of themes and ideas heavy-handed, writing, "Perhaps the chief deficit of Don't Worry Darling isn't even predictability, but a discernible lack of new ideas of its own."

The Guardian's Peter Bradshaw called it a "movie marooned in a desert of unoriginality", criticizing the screenplay and direction. Vulture.com's Bilge Ebiri called the film "smooth, competent, (mostly) well acted, and merely tedious", writing that the plot "can get boring and repetitive after a little while". Complimenting the performances of Pugh, Wilde, and Pine, he called Styles "the weak link ... who is not without talent but who fails to give Jack the dimensionality or inner conflict the character clearly needs." Phil de Semlyn of Time Out wrote, "Pugh saves this stylish but inert horror-thriller from disaster"; Richard Lawson of Vanity Fair echoed this, calling Pugh "a commanding and centered actor who makes the most of the hash she's served".

Anthony Lane of The New Yorker called Pine "the best thing in the film" and Styles "utterly and helplessly adrift" while reading lines of dialogue. Geoffrey Macnab of The Independent wrote, "Styles gives a surprisingly dull and low-wattage performance as Jack", adding that the film "is beautifully shot by cinematographer Matthew Libatique" and complimenting the visuals. Steph Green wrote for BBC that the film is "full of half-baked ideas" and "an empty shell" while also noting the film's repetitive nature. She wrote that "Pugh does her best with the material" but that "Styles doesn't feel up to the material here, with leaden line delivery and a lack of light and shade making his scenes opposite Pugh fall flat."

For Time magazine, Stephanie Zacharek wrote that "the plot is cleverly worked out" and complimented Pugh's performance, but disliked the film's ending and wrote that "Styles is cute, but a dud. Everything he does on-screen practically evaporates from one scene to the next." Scott Mendelson of Forbes named Pugh's performance "as good as you'd expect", complimented Pine as he "relishes the chance to play a smarmy villain", and argued that "Styles is as good as he needs to be" and that "some of the criticism of his performance has been more about the character than the actor."

Michael Shindler of The American Spectator, while noting the film does not suffer on account of cast performances, argued that based on Wilde's statements and reports of on-set developments, rather than being "a mere swing and a miss", the film could be construed as an exercise in unintentional self-criticism. Helen O'Hara of Empire complimented the cinematography and called Styles's performance "solid" while particularly praising Pugh, calling her performance "flawless", adding, "this is her film, and everyone else is just there for support." Pete Hammond of Deadline wrote that the film is "quite entertaining" and "kinda fun", adding that Styles "shows he is the real deal as an actor and has great promise" while also complimenting the performances of Pugh and Pine. Owen Gleiberman of Variety complimented the production design and wrote that Pugh "holds down the center of the movie" and that Jack is "played by Styles with a wholesome cunning that marks him as a natural screen actor" and that "with his popping eyes, floppy shock of hair, and saturnine suaveness, he recalls the young Frank Sinatra as an actor."

=== Accolades ===
Don’t Worry Darling received a nomination for Best Thriller Film at the 51st Saturn Awards. John Powell's musical score won the Ivor Novello Award for Best Original Film Score in May 2023.
