= Set It Up =

- Official release poster
- Directed by: Claire Scanlon
- Written by: Katie Silberman
- Produced by: Juliet Berman; Justin Nappi
- Starring: Zoey Deutch; Glen Powell; Taye Diggs; Lucy Liu
- Cinematography: Matthew Clark
- Edited by: Wendy Greene Bricmont
- Music by: Laura Karpman
- Production company: Treehouse Pictures
- Distributed by: Netflix
- Release dates: June 12, 2018 (New York City); June 15, 2018 (United States)
- Running time: 105 minutes
- Country: United States
- Language: English
- Budget: $13.8 million

Set It Up is a 2018 American romantic comedy film directed by Claire Scanlon, written by Katie Silberman, and starring Zoey Deutch, Glen Powell, Taye Diggs, and Lucy Liu. The film follows two overworked assistants in New York City who try to set up their demanding bosses on dates to take pressure off of them. It was released on June 15, 2018, by Netflix, to generally positive reviews from critics.

== Plot ==
Harper Moore is the assistant to Kirsten Stevens, a former journalist and now editor of an online sports journalism empire. Charlie Young is the assistant to high-strung venture capitalist Rick Otis. They work in the same building and meet one night when their bosses need dinner.

Harper has ordered dinner for Kirsten but has no cash to pay for it; Charlie, who was not able to order dinner for Rick, pays for it to give to Rick. When Harper tells him she will be fired if she does not return with food, Charlie allows her to take one of the meals.

The next day Harper reimburses Charlie for the food, and they talk about their jobs. Though Rick is abrasive, his connections would guarantee Charlie a promotion. Harper admires Kirsten's career and aspires to write sports journalism. Both assistants complain that they have no time for their personal lives.

Harper jokes that both of their bosses need to get laid, then proposes setting Kirsten and Rick up with each other, reasoning that if their bosses were dating each other, they would have less time to overwork them. After his girlfriend Suze almost breaks up with him due to his lack of free time, Charlie agrees to help.

Initially, the two plan to orchestrate a "meet cute" by having Rick and Kirsten's elevator stalled, with the help of janitor Creepy Tim. However, the plot goes awry when they are joined by a delivery man suffering from claustrophobia who starts stripping and urinating. Charlie and Harper then arrange for the two to sit beside each other at a baseball game, bribing the kiss-cam operator to pressure them into kissing. After three attempts, Rick and Kirsten kiss. They begin dating, leaving Charlie time to spend with Suze, and Harper time to date.

However, things between Rick and Kirsten quickly become bumpy, so Harper and Charlie realize they must work hard to keep their bosses together. They manipulate the two into staying together by secretly planning dates, leaving notes and gifts, and organizing a weekend vacation for them. When Charlie is ignored by Suze, he accompanies Harper to her best friend Becca's engagement party.

Returning from their vacation, Rick and Kirsten reveal they are now engaged. Harper and Charlie are thrilled, but Charlie learns that Rick proposed to Kirsten to aggravate his ex-wife Kiki, who he is still sleeping with. Harper discovers this when she overhears Rick having phone sex with Kiki. Confronting Charlie, she is disappointed to learn that he knew about it and still wants Kirsten and Rick to get married.

Harper goes to Kirsten and explains that she and Charlie manipulated them into dating; Kirsten fires her and plans to go on with the wedding. Charlie, realizing he does not love Suze, breaks up with her and runs to the airport, where Rick and Kirsten are about to leave to elope. Charlie quits his job, then tells Kirsten that Rick does not love her nor know her at all. She realizes it is true and leaves Rick.

Harper goes through a crisis with her writing, but Becca encourages her to make progress. Rick asks for Charlie's help in reuniting with his ex-wife, so Charlie tells him where to find his info on her. When Harper goes to her office to pick up her things, Kirsten tries to hire her back but Harper declines, choosing to focus on her writing. So, Kirsten offers to edit her article.

As she is leaving, Harper sees Charlie, who has been called there by Kirsten. They realize that Kirsten is attempting to set them up. Charlie reveals that he now works as a temp, hoping to learn what he actually wants to do. Harper and Charlie kiss upon confessing that they like each other, despite having many reasons not to.

In a mid-credits scene, Creepy Tim watches the couple through security cameras.

== Cast ==
- Zoey Deutch as Harper Moore, Kirsten's assistant
- Glen Powell as Charlie Young, Rick's assistant
- Lucy Liu as Kirsten Stevens, Harper's boss
- Taye Diggs as Rick Otis, Charlie's boss
- Joan Smalls as Suze, Charlie's girlfriend
- Meredith Hagner as Becca, Harper's engaged roommate and best friend
- Pete Davidson as Duncan, Charlie's roommate
- Jon Rudnitsky as Mike, Becca's fiancé
- Tituss Burgess as Creepy Tim, janitor
- Noah Robbins as Intern Bo

== Production ==
In February 2016, it was announced Emilia Clarke had been cast in the film, with Katie Silberman writing the film, while Justin Nappi and Juliet Berman were producing the film under their TreeHouse Pictures banner. Metro-Goldwyn-Mayer was originally set to distribute the film. In March 2017, it was announced Zoey Deutch and Glen Powell had joined the cast of the film, with Deutch replacing Clarke, Claire Scanlon directing from a screenplay written by Katie Silberman. Netflix eventually replaced Metro-Goldwyn-Mayer as the film's distributor. In June 2017, Taye Diggs, Lucy Liu, and Joan Smalls joined the cast of the film.

Principal photography began in June 2017 in New York City.

== Release ==
The film was released on Netflix on June 15, 2018.

== Reception ==
On the review aggregator website Rotten Tomatoes, 92% of 62 critics' reviews are positive. The website's consensus reads: "Set It Up follows the long-established outlines of the rom-com template - and in the process, proves there's still substantial pleasure to be wrought from familiar formulas." Metacritic, which uses a weighted average, assigned the film a score of 62 out of 100, based on 14 critics, indicating "generally favorable" reviews. The film has been called "a modern day classic."

== Possible sequel ==
Scanlon said in interviews that she had ideas for a possible sequel, should Netflix schedule one.

On March 8, 2023, Netflix released a compilation video of bloopers from the film.
