= Trophy Wife (TV series) =

American situation comedy

- Genre: Sitcom
- Created by: Emily Halpern; Sarah Haskins
- Starring: Malin Åkerman; Bradley Whitford; Michaela Watkins; Natalie Morales; Ryan Lee; Gianna LePera; Bailee Madison; Albert Tsai; Marcia Gay Harden
- Composer: Gabriel Mann
- Country of origin: United States
- Original language: English
- No. of seasons: 1
- No. of episodes: 22

Production
- Executive producers: Emily Halpern; Sarah Haskins; Lee Eisenberg; Gene Stupnitsky
- Camera setup: Single-camera
- Running time: 22 minutes
- Production companies: Quantity Entertainment; ABC Studios

Original release
- Network: ABC
- Release: September 24, 2013 – May 13, 2014

Trophy Wife is an American television sitcom that aired during the 2013–14 television season on ABC. The series was co-created and executive produced by Emily Halpern and Sarah Haskins for ABC Studios. The series was green-lit by ABC for a series order pick up on May 10, 2013. The series originally ran from September 24, 2013 to May 13, 2014.

On May 8, 2014, ABC canceled the series after one season.

== Premise ==
The series revolved around Kate (Malin Åkerman), a young, attractive, blonde party girl, who marries a middle aged lawyer named Pete (Bradley Whitford). The marriage comes with Pete's two ex-wives: the stern, perfectionist doctor, Diane (Marcia Gay Harden), and the flaky, flamboyant, new age Jackie (Michaela Watkins). Also, Pete has three children from the prior relationships: overachieving, good girl, Hillary (Bailee Madison), slacker Warren (Ryan Lee), and rambunctious Bert (Albert Tsai). The series explores the marriage and generation gap between Kate and Pete, along with the modern family dynamics between them, the ex-wives, and their respective children.

== Production ==
Hillary was played by Gianna LePera in the pilot, but replaced with Bailee Madison when the series went into production.

On November 1, 2013, ABC gave a full-season order to the series bringing the first season to 22 episodes. Trophy Wife averaged 5.7 million total viewers and a 1.9 rating when factoring in seven-day DVR ratings.

== Cast and characters ==
- Malin Åkerman as Kate Walrus-Harrison, Pete's third wife and the titular trophy wife
- Bradley Whitford as Pete Harrison, Kate's husband
- Michaela Watkins as Jackie Fisher, Pete's second wife and Bert's adoptive mother
- Natalie Morales as Meg Gomez, Kate's best friend
- Ryan Lee as Warren Harrison, Pete & Diane's son and Hillary's older fraternal twin brother
- Gianna LePera (pilot) & Bailee Madison as Hillary Harrison, Pete & Diane's daughter and Warren's younger fraternal twin sister
- Albert Tsai as Bert Harrison, Pete & Jackie's adoptive son
- Marcia Gay Harden as Dr. Diane Buckley, Pete's first wife and Warren & Hillary's mother

== Reception ==
Trophy Wife has received very positive reviews. Melia Robinson of Business Insider named it the tenth best new TV show of 2013, saying that it "delivers fresh humor, steeped in irony with a surprising sweetness" and dubbed it "a 'Modern-er Family'". Hank Stuever of The Washington Post gave the series a "B", praising the adults as "entertaining to watch and believably flawed" and the kids as "talented wiseacres". Matt Webb Mitovich of TVLine called it one of the best and strongest new sitcoms of the year, but criticised the network for putting it in a "ghastly" time slot. He particularly singled out Malin Åkerman for praise, saying that she "no less than shines here, coming off as fun-loving but not flaky, warm and not overheated".

Other critics agreed with Roth Cornet of IGN singling out Åkerman's chemistry with co-star Bradley Whitford and her aptitude for physical comedy. Gabriel Mizrahi of The Huffington Post called Åkerman "terrific" and the show "funny and realistic" with "delightfully un-sitcom-y performances". Maggie Pehanick of PopSugar and Daniel Fienberg of HitFix also liked Åkerman and Whitford's chemistry, with Fienberg saying that "Åkerman's bubbly energy has instantly great foils in [Marcia Gay] Harden's brilliant iciness and [Michaela] Watkins' loopy mania and also in the sarcastic preppiness that Whitford plays as well as anyone." Danielle Turchiano of The Examiner gave the show 4 stars out of 5 and praised Åkerman, Harden, and Watkins for presenting "some of the most interesting and funniest women on television". She did feel that the title suggests the show is something that it's not, a point that Joanne Ostrow of The Denver Post agreed with. Willa Paskin of Salon called the title "terrible... an insult to its lovely, daffy main character and... at odds with the show's focus on female relationships. It's not just dumb marketing, it belies the women-are-not-reducible-to-clichés spirit of the show." She went on to call the show "wonderfully cast", particularly enjoying Åkerman's performance and saying that "Like the late Happy Endings' Elisha Cuthbert, she seems to delight in going for it in the way that only pretty blonde women who have been stuck playing pretty blonde love interests in romantic comedies can."

Executive producer Lee Eisenberg explained that the title is "meant to be ironic" and that the show will focus on how Åkerman's character is not like a "trophy wife". When Åkerman read the script, she loved the writing and the character and how "not trophy wife" she is.

Review aggregator Metacritic gives the series a weighted average score of 63% based on reviews from 28 critics, indicating "Generally favorable reviews".

Albert Tsai was nominated for a Critics' Choice Television Award for Best Supporting Actor in a Comedy Series.

=== International broadcast ===
Trophy Wife premiered in New Zealand on Monday 13 January 2014 on TV2 (New Zealand). It premiered at 8:30 pm, after the Shortland Street season premiere and the first episode of Super Fun Night. The following week it moved to its regular timeslot of 9:00 pm Monday. On Monday 10 February, due to high ratings, Trophy Wife was moved to an earlier timeslot of 8:00 pm, after The Middle. As of April 21, New Zealand was 4 episodes behind the US. From May 12, Trophy Wife moved to 8:40 pm, due to My Kitchen Rules. The series finale aired on Monday 23 June 2014.

The Show made its Australian debut on 7flix. on Sunday August 29, 2016.

Trophy Wife is rated PG in New Zealand for coarse language and sexual references. It was aired in India on Star World network

== Episodes ==
No.	Title	Directed by	Written by	Original release date	Prod. code	U.S. viewers (millions)
1	"Pilot"	Jason Moore	Emily Halpern and Sarah Haskins	September 24, 2013	101	6.69
A former party girl marries a significantly older man knowing that he has "baggage" (two ex-wives and three children between them), and she soon realizes the baggage is going to bring new challenges every day.
2	"Cold File"	Bryan Gordon	Emily Halpern and Sarah Haskins	October 1, 2013	103	4.30
Kate has to watch Bert while both Jackie and Pete are out for the evening, and she can't get Bert to surrender and go to sleep. When he is over-tired in the morning, a frustrated Kate gives him coffee. Bert is energetic at soccer practice that day, but crashes hard later. Meanwhile, Diane uses a little psychological torture to get Warren and Hillary to confess to an accident they had in the house.
3	"The Social Network"	Jason Moore	Daniel Chun	October 8, 2013	102	4.77
Pete and Diane are tired of Hillary's lies, and suggest going through her room, while Kate tries a friendlier approach; Jackie includes Bert in her business venture.
4	"The Breakup"	Jeff Melman	Lindsey Shockley	October 15, 2013	104	4.12
Kate's friend Meg has just broken up with another boyfriend, and wants to stay with Kate and Pete for a while. Kate tries to set some boundaries as she is now part of a family, but Meg crosses all of them, causing a fight. Meanwhile, Jackie pulls Warren away from school work to help Bert with a lego project, which angers Diane.
5	"The Tryst"	Victor Nelli	Casey Johnson and David Windsor	October 22, 2013	105	4.05
Kate (as Melanie Griffith in Working Girl) and Pete (as Billy Idol) attend an 80s-themed party where Kate encourages Pete to stop helping Diane. Meanwhile, Bert is jealous when Jackie begins looking for a new man with the help of Warren and Hillary.
6	"Halloween"	Alex Hardcastle	Vijal Patel	October 29, 2013	106	4.33
Bert and Kate bond on Halloween, making Jackie feel ignored; Pete steals a kid's halloween candy and tries to get him to admit that he vandalized the house a year earlier.
7	"The Date"	Eric Appel	Gail Lerner	November 5, 2013	108	3.66
Jackie is set up on a date, but winds up with one of Pete's co-workers who is known throughout the office as "Sad Steve" (Nat Faxon). Diane plays beer-pong with Kate's friend Meg.
8	"Lice and Beary White"	Elliot Hegarty	Stacy Traub	November 12, 2013	107	3.72
Bert has picked up lice at school which threatens the Harrison household. Diane takes control of the situation, leaving Kate to lament that she has no motherly role with the kids. Meanwhile, Bert and Warren fight over who should get to keep a special stuffed bear.
9	"Russ Bradley Morrison"	Peter Lauer	Daniel Chun	December 3, 2013	109	3.45
While serving as a chaperone on Warren's field trip, Kate tries to hook Diane up with another parent, Russ Bradley Morrison (Dennis Haysbert), but is surprised to find out Diane and Russ are already in a relationship; Jackie quarantines Pete.
10	"'Twas the Night Before Christmas ... Or 'Twas It"	John Fortenberry	Lindsey Shockley	December 10, 2013	111	3.48
Pete and Kate wake up on Christmas morning severely hung over after getting hammered on Christmas Eve. For Kate, it is the first time the former "party girl" had partied really hard since marrying Pete. The two survey the disheveled house and try to figure out what happened from their fragmented memories of the night before.
11	"The Big 5-0"	Christine Gernon	Vijal Patel	January 7, 2014	113	3.83
Pete goes out of his way to avoid celebrating his 50th birthday, citing bad things that seem to happen every year on that day. Kate is determined to give Pete a celebration anyway, but starts to believe Pete's birthday may indeed be cursed when things go awry.
12	"The Punisher"	Rebecca Asher	Ben Smith	January 14, 2014	110	3.46
Kate must figure a way to punish Warren and Hillary after they tape Warren jumping off the shed roof into the pool, but when she calls upon Diane, the only advice she gets is that she has to punish them herself. Kate takes away their electronics, finds Warren and Hillary trying to work every angle to get their stuff back, and begins to stoop to their level. Diane ultimately tells Kate she should just ignore their antics and be the adult. Meanwhile Pete and Jackie take Bert to play mini golf to reassure him that they aren't fighting. After 18 holes of stressful mini golf, Bert ends up winning another 18 holes, causing Pete and Jackie to crack and get themselves kicked out.
13	"The Tooth Fairy"	Jeff Melman	Justin Malen	January 21, 2014	114	3.37
Pete is excited when Bert loses a tooth while they are at dinner, but is horrified later when he discovers he misplaced it. Pete tries to replace it with a tooth he kept from Warren, but Jackie figures it out and the two start a battle over depriving each other of their child's "firsts". Hillary is excited to set up a sleep-over with girls from school and Diane helps her plan it. But when the girls arrive and do not enjoy anything Diane and Hillary prepared, Hillary has to act like her mom is embarrassing her. Kate works with Warren to help him get a girlfriend. After things go wrong between Warren and the girl, she finds a way they can meet the girl again, and realizes the one "first" she can enjoy is the kids' first relationships.
14	"Foxed Lunch"	Beth McCarthy-Miller	Casey Johnson and David Windsor	February 4, 2014	112	3.24
Jackie starts a business selling creative, specially-prepared lunches for the busy moms at Bert's school to give their kids. With Pete's encouragement, Kate helps Jackie with the start-up, feeling it will give her something worthwhile to do with her time. As the orders start to pile up, Jackie begins treating "Foxed Lunches" as just another one of her fleeting business ventures, leaving Kate to do all the work.
15	"Happy Bert Day"	Eric Appel	Ava Tramer	March 4, 2014	116	2.64
During an over-the-top birthday party for Bert, Kate hears her neighbors gossiping about her being a stripper in the past. While trying to track down the source of the rumor, the finger ultimately points to Jackie.
16	"The Wedding - Part One"	Jason Moore	Lindsey Shockley	March 11, 2014	117	2.99
After watching Pete's old wedding tapes, Kate regrets that the two only had a courtroom marriage and decides she wants to have an actual ceremony in front of friends and family. She also decides it's time to change her last name to Harrison, but while applying for the change, the official says she must prove to immigration that her wedding isn't a citizenship sham or she'll be deported to Canada. Meanwhile, Diane decides it's time to make her relationship with Russ public knowledge, while Jackie considers letting Bert know that Sad Steve is her boyfriend.
17	"The Wedding - Part Two"	Claire Scanlon	Emily Halpern and Sarah Haskins	March 18, 2014	118	3.22
Kate's carefree Mom (Megan Mullally) makes waves by showing up to town for the wedding in handcuffs, then hiring male strippers for the rehearsal dinner. Pete finds out that each of his parents is keeping a secret from the other. Meanwhile, Warren and Bert rebel against being called "adorable" by their parents. When the ceremony gets cancelled by the sudden passing of Pete's Aunt Margaret, the families have one final surprise for Kate.
18	"Couples Therapy"	Gail Lerner	Gail Lerner	April 1, 2014	115	3.04
Pete lies and tells Diane that he and Kate are in couples counseling. Kate goes along with it, so that she and Pete can have some fun during their fake appointment times. But Jackie wants to know details of their sessions, causing the two to make up more lies. Elsewhere, Warren and Hillary each become fascinated by Meg, but for different reasons.
19	"The Minutes"	Tristam Shapeero	Ben Smith	April 8, 2014	119	2.82
Kate hurts Diane's ribs while saving her from choking, so she takes over the next PTA meeting and does some unflattering imitations of Diane and a couple of faculty members. But a PTA member has been taking minutes of the whole thing, and Kate gets blackmailed. When Evan Kramer's parents forbid him from going to a school dance with Hillary, Pete and Jackie are certain it's because they and the Kramers had a feud when they were neighbors. Meanwhile, a dateless Warren finds a way to get Vanessa Hudgens to accept his invitation to the dance.
20	"There's No Guy in Team"	Ken Marino	Howie Kremer	April 29, 2014	120	3.16
Kate feels sorry for Warren when it appears that Diane is the only "friend" willing to do anything with him, so she encourages Warren to join a club or team at school. That seemingly backfires when Warren joins the all-girls field hockey team, but despite Kate's best efforts and concerns, she sees Warren is actually enjoying being on the team. Elsewhere, Hillary gets a 'C' on an art project and enlists Jackie's help on a make-up assignment, while Pete tries in vain to teach Bert the value of making an honest dollar.
21	"Back to School"	Matt Sohn	Streeter Seidell	May 6, 2014	121	2.48
Diane and Pete take Hillary on a field trip to the university of her choice, with Warren tagging along. Hillary discovers she is no longer the smartest person in the room as she is in high school, while Pete tries to get Warren excited about possibly going to college. Jackie begs Kate to accompany her to her high school reunion, then surprises Kate by telling her classmates that the two are a married lesbian couple. Meanwhile, Meg and her boyfriend are left home to babysit Bert.
22	"Mother's Day"	Paul Lauer	Gene Stupnitsky and Lee Eisenberg	May 13, 2014	122	2.83
Diane and Jackie "acknowledge Kate's motherhood" by letting her spend Mother's Day with the kids, but Kate realizes there was an ulterior motive. Meanwhile, Pete's firm goes into full crisis mode when an oil company they represent has a spill in South America. Pete is promoted to lead counsel solely for the purpose of being the oil company's fall guy. While Kate is confronting Diane and Jackie, she gets news that Pete has suffered a heart attack.
