= Emily Halpern =

American film and television screenwriter

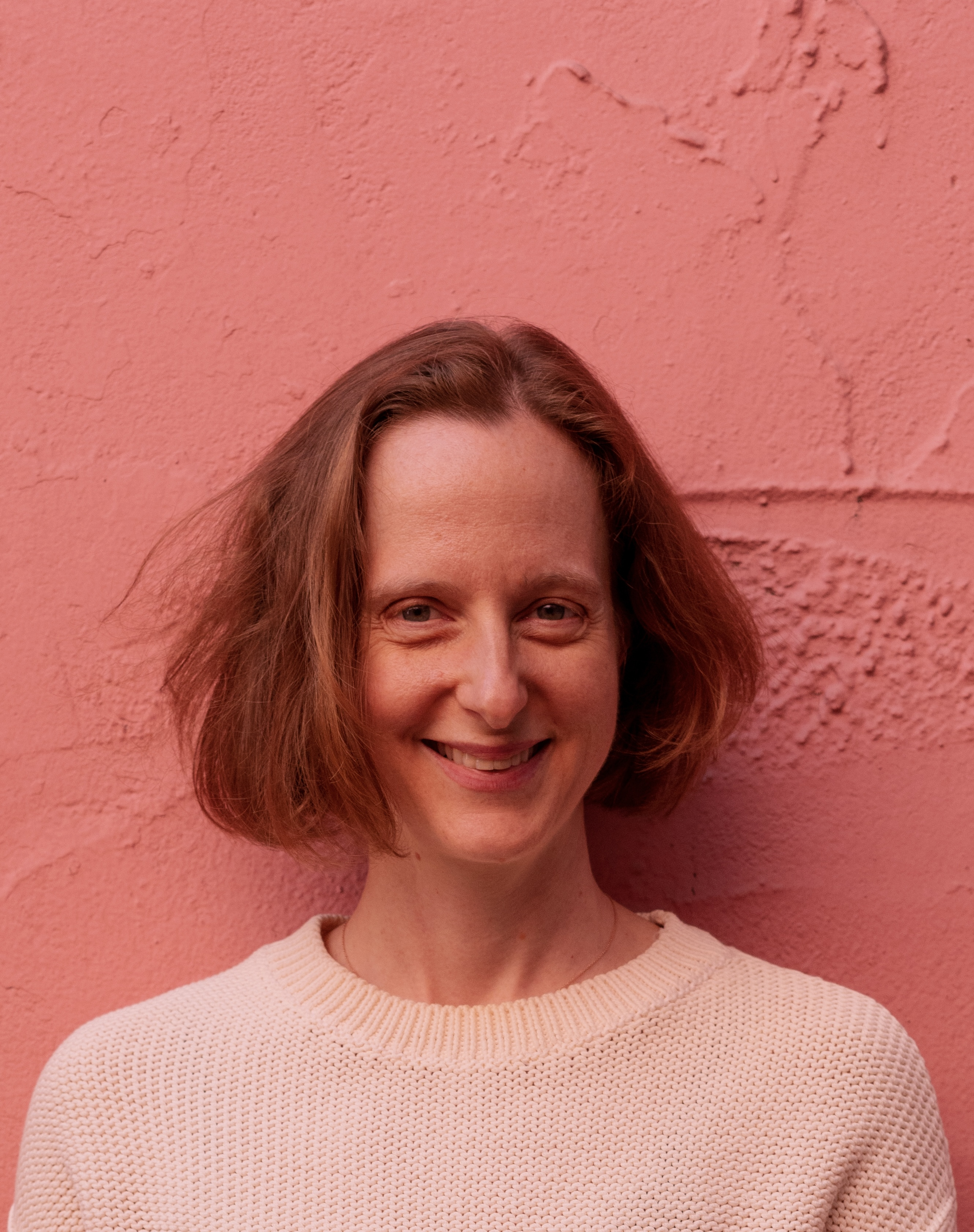
- Born: Massachusetts, U.S.
- Education: Harvard College
- Occupations: Screenwriter, producer, director
- Years active: 2006–present

Emily Halpern is an American film and television screenwriter and singer-songwriter. She is best known for co-writing the screenplay of Booksmart and was nominated for Best Original Screenplay at the British Academy of Film and Television Arts in 2020. She released her debut album, Carry Me Home, in 2022.

== Life and career ==
Halpern was born in Massachusetts, and graduated from Harvard College. She began her career writing for the CBS television series The Unit and the ABC television series Private Practice. In 2019, she co-wrote the screenplay for her debut feature film Booksmart, along with Sarah Haskins. Most recently, she co-wrote the film 80 for Brady, along with Sarah Haskins.

In 2022, Halpern released her debut album Carry Me Home.

== Filmography ==
Year	Title	Contribution	Note
2006–2007	The Unit	Staff writer	TV series
2007–2008	Private Practice	Writer	TV series
2010	Dilf	Writer	Short film
2013	Family Tools : Terry by Design	Staff writer	TV series
2013–2014	Trophy Wife	Creator and writer	TV series
2017	Black-ish : Manternity	Writer	TV series
2017	Imaginary Mary : The Mom Seal	Writer	TV series
2017	The Mayor	Writer	TV series
2019	Booksmart	Writer	Feature film
2019	Good Girls	Writer	TV series
2019–2020	Carol's Second Act	Creator and writer	TV series
2023	80 for Brady	Writer	Feature film

== Awards and nominations ==
Year	Result	Award	Category	Work	Ref.
2017	Nominated	Primetime Emmy Awards	Outstanding Comedy Series	Black-ish	
2019	Won	Hollywood Critics Association Midseason Awards	Best Original Screenplay	Booksmart	
2019	Nominated	Women Film Critics Circle	Best Woman Storyteller	Booksmart	
2019	Nominated	St. Louis Film Critics Association	Best Original Screenplay	Booksmart	
2019	Nominated	Dublin Film Critics' Circle	Best Screenplay	Booksmart	
2020	Nominated	Writers Guild of America	Original Screenplay	Booksmart	
2020	Nominated	Hollywood Critics Association	Best Original Screenplay	Booksmart	
2020	Nominated	Alliance of Women Film Journalists	Best Woman Screenwriter	Booksmart	
2020	Nominated	British Academy Film Awards	Best Original Screenplay	Booksmart	
