= Booksmart =

2019 film by Olivia Wilde

- Theatrical release poster
- Directed by: Olivia Wilde
- Written by: Emily Halpern; Sarah Haskins; Susanna Fogel; Katie Silberman
- Produced by: Megan Ellison; Chelsea Barnard; David Distenfield; Jessica Elbaum; Katie Silberman
- Starring: Kaitlyn Dever; Beanie Feldstein; Jessica Williams; Lisa Kudrow; Will Forte; Jason Sudeikis
- Cinematography: Jason McCormick
- Edited by: Brent White; Jamie Gross
- Music by: Dan the Automator
- Production companies: Annapurna Pictures; Gloria Sanchez Productions
- Distributed by: United Artists Releasing
- Release dates: March 10, 2019 (SXSW); May 24, 2019 (United States)
- Running time: 102 minutes
- Country: United States
- Language: English
- Budget: $6 million
- Box office: $25 million

Booksmart is a 2019 American coming-of-age comedy film directed by Olivia Wilde (in her feature directorial debut) and written by Emily Halpern, Sarah Haskins, Susanna Fogel, and Katie Silberman. It stars Beanie Feldstein and Kaitlyn Dever as two graduating high school girls who set out to finally break the rules and party on their last day of classes. Jessica Williams, Lisa Kudrow, Will Forte, and Jason Sudeikis also star.

The film had its world premiere at South by Southwest on March 10, 2019, and was theatrically released in the United States on May 24, by United Artists Releasing. It received critical acclaim and grossed $25 million against a $6 million budget. For her performance, Feldstein was nominated for Best Actress – Comedy or Musical at the 77th Golden Globe Awards.

== Plot ==
High school seniors and longtime best friends Amy Antsler and Molly Davidson are accomplished Ivy League–bound students but unpopular with their peers despite Molly being class president. Amy has a crush on a girl named Ryan, which Molly urges her to pursue.

On the eve of graduation, Molly confronts classmates insulting her bookishness and boasts that she got into Yale University, but they reveal that, despite their partying and debauchery, they also got into prestigious colleges or job recruitments. Furious, Molly tells Amy they should have enjoyed their time in high school more, so Amy reluctantly agrees to go to a graduation party held by classmate Nick.

Unaware of the party's address, Molly calls Jared, a wealthy classmate who likes her. He instead takes them to his own party aboard a yacht. Only his drug-crazed friend Gigi is there, who feeds the girls strawberries before jumping off the yacht. Amy suggests they go home, but Molly calls a "Malala", their code for unconditionally supporting what the other wants to do.

The girls call a rideshare car and are shocked to be picked up by their principal, Jordan Brown. To prepare Amy for possible sex with Ryan, Molly insists they watch pornography, which accidentally plays through the car speakers.

Brown drops them off at what they think is Nick's party, but it is the home of their classmate George, who is hosting a murder mystery party. They again encounter Gigi, who reveals that the strawberries were laced with hallucinogens, whereupon they trip that they are plastic fashion dolls. They leave George's house, but Gigi reveals Molly secretly likes Nick.

Amy insists they press on so that Molly can pursue her crush on Nick. They see pizza boxes in an online video of Nick's party and acquire the address by threatening the pizza delivery man. With only 2% phone battery, Molly calls their favorite teacher, Miss Fine, who gives them a ride to Nick's party.

Once there, they are surprised to find they are warmly welcomed. Molly and Nick flirt over beer pong and Amy spends time with Ryan. Amy finds Ryan making out with Nick. Heartbroken, she finds Molly and calls her own "Malala", which Molly refuses because she still thinks she has a chance with Nick. Amy angrily reveals she is not just spending the summer in Botswana but taking an entire gap year because she resents how Molly always tries to control her life. The two argue in front of the entire party.

Amy runs to the bathroom, finding her classmate Hope. They are initially argumentative until Amy kisses her. They start to have sex, until Amy vomits on Hope. Jared and Molly have a heartfelt conversation about how no-one at school really knows them. Cops arrive at the party so everyone scatters. Unable to find Amy, Molly is driven home by "Triple A", a popular student with a promiscuous reputation. They bond over the stereotyping they have both endured.

Waking up on graduation day, Molly checks her phone and discovers her classmates praising Amy for creating a diversion at the party, allowing everyone to escape the police while getting herself arrested. Molly visits her in jail and apologizes for her manipulative actions, and they reconcile. Recognizing that the pizza delivery man is a serial killer from a wanted poster in jail, they trade information to free Amy, and take Jared's car to graduation.

Molly kisses Jared onstage and gives an improvised valedictorian speech, receiving a standing ovation. A few days later, as Molly helps Amy prepare for her trip to Botswana, Hope visits to give Amy her phone number. Molly drives Amy to the airport where they share a tearful goodbye, but then Amy decides she still has time to hang out before her flight, so they ecstatically decide to get pancakes.

== Cast ==
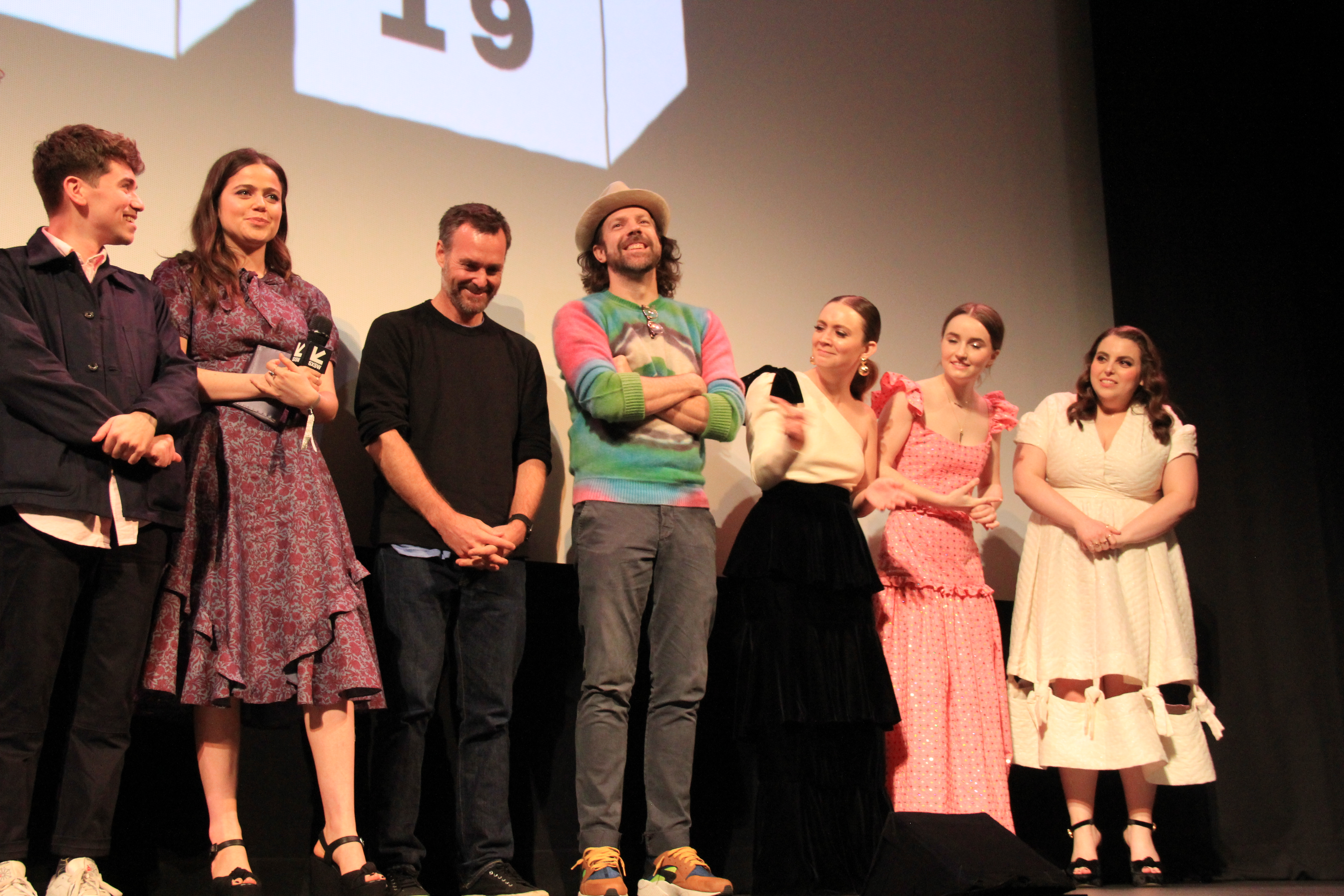
(L:R) Noah Galvin, Molly Gordon, Will Forte, Jason Sudeikis, Billie Lourd, Kaitlyn Dever, and Beanie Feldstein at the film's South by Southwest premiere

- Beanie Feldstein as Molly Davidson
- Kaitlyn Dever as Amy Antsler
- Jessica Williams as Miss Fine
- Lisa Kudrow as Charmaine Antsler
- Will Forte as Doug Antsler
- Jason Sudeikis as Principal Jordan Brown
- Billie Lourd as Gigi
- Diana Silvers as Hope
- Skyler Gisondo as Jared
- Molly Gordon as Annabelle aka "Triple A"
- Noah Galvin as George
- Austin Crute as Alan
- Victoria Ruesga as Ryan
- Eduardo Franco as Theo
- Nico Hiraga as Tanner
- Mason Gooding as Nick Howland
- Mike O'Brien as Pat the Pizza Guy
- Bluesy Burke as Cindy
- Christopher Avila as Rob
- Stephanie Styles as Alison
- Adam Simon Krist as Dick
- Gideon Lang as Skip
- Maya Rudolph as Motivational Voice

== Production ==
=== Development ===
An early version of the screenplay, Book Smart by Emily Halpern and Sarah Haskins, was circulated in 2009 and appeared on the 2009 Black List; in 2014 Susanna Fogel revised the screenplay, rewriting one lead character as a lesbian and revising the story so the girls are not seeking boyfriends for the prom, but are going to an after-prom party.

Following the revisions, Annapurna Pictures purchased the screenplay and approached Gloria Sanchez Productions to produce it; Gloria Sanchez' Jessica Elbaum pitched the screenplay to Olivia Wilde, who read the screenplay and two days later expressed admiration for it. Megan Ellison, Chelsea Bernard, David Distenfeld, Will Ferrell, Adam McKay, and Elbaum would serve as producers on the film. Screenwriter Katie Silberman was hired for more revisions in spring 2018, and to update the story. Silberman explored a new concept:

What if the two friends realized that they did high school all wrong? What if they realized that everyone they thought just partied and wasted their high-school years were going to Ivy League schools just like them?

According to Silberman, "Olivia's mantra to all of us was that high school is war". Wilde also envisioned "a drug trip where the girls turned into Barbie dolls" and gave Silberman the responsibility of where to incorporate it into the story.

=== Casting ===
In February 2018, Kaitlyn Dever and Beanie Feldstein joined the cast of the film. In May 2018, Billie Lourd and Skyler Gisondo joined the cast of the film. That same month, Jason Sudeikis, Lisa Kudrow, Jessica Williams, Will Forte, Mike O'Brien, Mason Gooding, Noah Galvin, Diana Silvers, Austin Crute, Eduardo Franco, Molly Gordon, and Nico Hiraga joined the cast of the film.

Silvers was initially asked to audition for Ryan, but felt her appearance was not ideal for the character and auditioned for Hope instead. Wilde also urged Feldstein and Dever to live together to develop a rapport. The two actresses were roommates in Los Angeles for ten weeks. Wilde also asked the cast to read the screenplay and signal if they found dialogue that felt "inauthentic ... [and] rewrite it in your own voice". Silberman continued to write after casting, finding it easy to come up with dialogue to fit Feldstein and Dever. Silberman particularly credited the complementary language the characters use to Feldstein, who frequently posted "I have no breath" to Instagram. Wilde joked that her relationship with Sudeikis was his audition.

=== Filming ===
Principal photography began in May 2018 around the San Fernando Valley. As a working mother, Wilde found the night filming challenging, but in the morning after filming she would take the time to bring her children to school. The effort was not something she could keep up in the long run, but having achieved her dream of getting to direct she was determined to "give it my all and make it work".

The research scene inside the library took place at Woodbury University.

Wilde and production designer Katie Byron decorated the bedrooms seen in the film, including with trophies and depictions of prominent American women Michelle Obama and Ruth Bader Ginsburg.

The animated dolls sequence was created over five months by a team of thirty people. Wilde had voiced a character on the series BoJack Horseman and contacted ShadowMachine, the animation studio behind BoJack, to create the sequence. Due to script rewrites, parts of the animated scene involving a Roomba and a scene showing glitter vomit were cut from the film.

=== Music ===
The score for Booksmart was composed by Dan the Automator. Although he had assisted with the scores of Scott Pilgrim vs. the World (2010) and Money Monster (2016), Booksmart was the first full film score that Dan composed for a major US film.

== Release ==
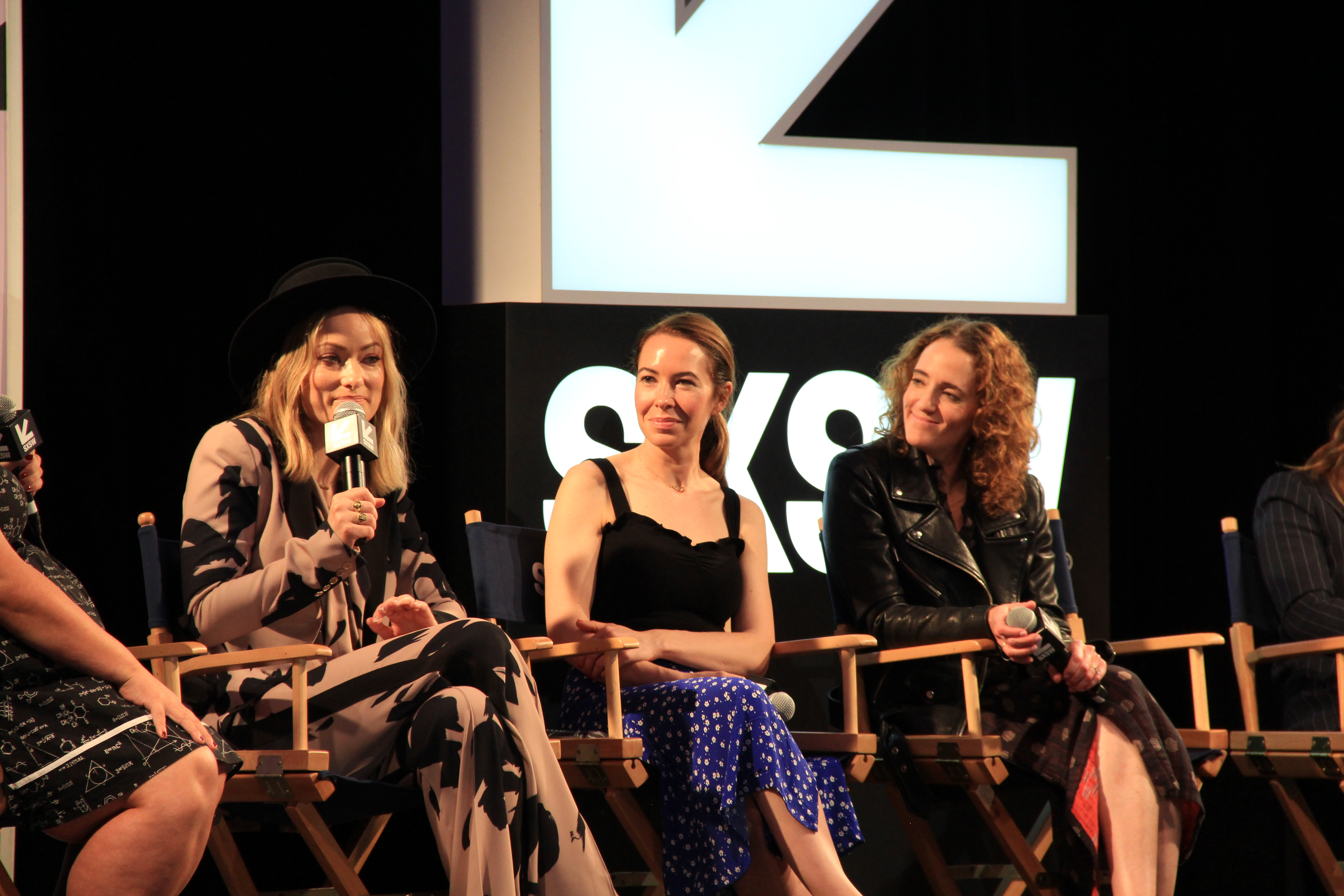
Director Olivia Wilde, co-writer Katie Silberman, and producer Jessica Elbaum at the South by Southwest Booksmart panel

Booksmart premiered at the South by Southwest film festival on March 10, 2019. It was then released theatrically in the United States on May 24, 2019, by Annapurna Pictures under its United Artists label. United Artists also utilized an Instagram campaign to sell tickets to a total of 800 advanced screenings across the country on May 17, 2019. While some film analysts predicted that Booksmart would have its theatrical release in the fall, following the trend of previous R-rated, female-centered films Lady Bird and The Edge of Seventeen, Annapurna decided on a wide release over Memorial Day weekend in order to build on the word-of-mouth traction they had generated from the festival premiere. Booksmart was released on digital download on August 20, 2019, and on DVD and Blu-ray on September 3, 2019.

== Reception ==
=== Box office ===
Booksmart grossed $22.7 million in the United States and Canada, and $2.2 million in other territories, for a worldwide total of $24.9 million.

In the United States and Canada, Booksmart was released alongside Aladdin and Brightburn, and was projected to gross around $12 million from 2,505 theaters in its four-day opening weekend. The film made $2.5 million on its first day, including $875,000 from Thursday night previews. It ended up underperforming, debuting to just $6.9 million (a four-day total of $8.7 million), finishing in sixth place. Industry publications insisted that although the targeted young female demographic did turn out to the film, it should have begun with a limited release and expanded, similar to the R-rated, female-led high school comedy Lady Bird in 2017, and that Booksmart failed to stand out in the crowded marketplace. In its second weekend the film made $3.3 million, dropping 52% and finishing in eighth.

The film's largest market outside North America was the United Kingdom, where it grossed around US$1.8 million (£1.5 million) after seven weeks in theaters.

Director J. J. Abrams asked: "When you have a movie that's as entertaining, well-made, and well-received as Booksmart not doing the business it should have [the teen comedy underperforming at the box office despite critics' raves], it really makes you realize that the typical Darwinian fight to survive is completely lopsided now. Everyone's trying to figure out how we protect the smaller films that aren't four-quadrant mega-releases. Can they exist in the cinema?"

=== Critical response ===
On review aggregator Rotten Tomatoes, the film holds an approval rating of 96% based on 385 reviews, with an average rating of 8.3/10. The website's critics consensus reads, "Fast-paced, funny, and fresh, Booksmart does the seemingly impossible by adding a smart new spin to the coming-of-age comedy." On Metacritic, the film has a weighted average score of 84 out of 100, based on 52 critics, indicating "universal acclaim". Audiences polled by CinemaScore gave the film an average grade of "B+" on an A+ to F scale, while those at PostTrak gave it an overall positive score of 80%. In December 2019, Rotten Tomatoes named Booksmart the #1 comedy of the decade on the site, using an adjusted formula that weighed multiple factors, including a film's release year and number of reviews.

Peter Debruge of Variety praised the ensemble cast as well as Wilde's direction, calling the film "the best high school buddy comedy since Superbad". John DeFore of The Hollywood Reporter called the film a "hilarious, blazingly paced teen comedy." Writing for the Chicago Sun-Times, Richard Roeper gave the film three-and-a-half stars out of four, calling it a "refreshingly original take on the raunchy coming-of-age comedy" and praising Feldstein and Dever's chemistry. Alissa Wilkinson of Vox awarded the film a score of four out of five, writing that the "memorably relatable" Booksmart is also a "delightful reminder that growing up is about realizing nobody's a stereotype".

Linda Holmes of NPR gave an especially favorable review, calling the film "a humane and heartfelt film without a mean bone in its figurative body". Vulture's Emily Yoshida also favorably wrote that it "manages to be inclusive and progressive, without being precious about anything or sacrificing an ounce of humor". A. O. Scott of The New York Times regarded the film as "sharp but not mean, warm without feeling too soft or timid", and referring to Feldstein and Dever as "a classic comedy duo". Joe Morgenstern of The Wall Street Journal deemed Booksmart a "prodigy", stating that no film that was "funnier, smarter, quicker or more joyous has graced the big screen in a long time."

=== Accolades ===
Booksmart was included on 68 critics' top-ten lists, and on two lists was ranked in first place.

In 2021, members of Writers Guild of America West (WGAW) and Writers Guild of America, East (WGAE) voted its screenplay 69th in WGA's 101 Greatest Screenplays of the 21st Century (so far). In 2025, it was one of the films voted for the "Readers' Choice" edition of The New York Times' list of "The 100 Best Movies of the 21st Century," finishing at number 309.

Award	Date of ceremony	Category	Recipient(s)	Result	Ref.
Austin Film Critics Association	January 6, 2020	Best First Film	Booksmart	Won	
British Academy Film Awards	February 2, 2020	Best Original Screenplay	Susanna Fogel, Emily Halpern, Sarah Haskins, and Katie Silberman	Nominated	
British Academy Film Awards	February 2, 2020	BAFTA Rising Star Award	Kaitlyn Dever	Nominated	
Chicago Film Critics Association	December 14, 2019	Milos Stehlik Breakthrough Filmmaker Award	Olivia Wilde	Nominated	
Critics' Choice Awards	January 12, 2020	Best Comedy	Booksmart	Nominated	
Detroit Film Critics Society	December 9, 2019	Breakthrough	Kaitlyn Dever	Nominated (Note: Also for Them That Follow)	
Detroit Film Critics Society	December 9, 2019	Breakthrough	Olivia Wilde	Nominated	
Dorian Awards	January 8, 2020	LGBTQ Film of the Year	Booksmart	Nominated	
Dublin Film Critics Circle	December 17, 2019	Best Film	Booksmart	5th place	
Dublin Film Critics Circle	December 17, 2019	Best Director	Olivia Wilde	4th place	
Dublin Film Critics Circle	December 17, 2019	Best Screenplay	Emily Halpern, Sarah Haskins, Susanna Fogel, and Katie Silberman	2nd place	
GLAAD Media Awards	March 19, 2020	Outstanding Film – Wide Release	Booksmart	Won	
Golden Globe Awards	January 5, 2020	Best Actress – Musical or Comedy	Beanie Feldstein	Nominated	
Gotham Independent Film Awards	December 2, 2019	Bingham Ray Breakthrough Director Award	Olivia Wilde	Nominated	
Gotham Independent Film Awards	December 2, 2019	Audience Award	Booksmart	Nominated	
Hollywood Critics Association Awards	January 9, 2020	Best Picture	Booksmart	Nominated	
Hollywood Critics Association Awards	January 9, 2020	Best Original Screenplay	Emily Halpern, Sarah Haskins, Susanna Fogel, and Katie Silberman	Nominated	
Hollywood Critics Association Awards	January 9, 2020	Best Female Director	Olivia Wilde	Won	
Hollywood Critics Association Awards	January 9, 2020	Best Performance by an Actor or Actress 23 and Under	Kaitlyn Dever	Won	
Hollywood Critics Association Awards	January 9, 2020	Best First Feature	Booksmart	Nominated	
Hollywood Critics Association Awards	January 9, 2020	Best Independent Feature	Booksmart	Nominated	
Hollywood Critics Association Awards	January 9, 2020	Best Comedy/Musical	Booksmart	Won	
Hollywood Film Awards	November 3, 2019	Hollywood Breakthrough Director Award	Olivia Wilde	Won	
Independent Spirit Awards	February 8, 2020	Best First Feature	Booksmart	Won	
IndieWire Critics Polls	December 16, 2019	Best Picture	Booksmart	18th place	
IndieWire Critics Polls	December 16, 2019	Best Actress	Beanie Feldstein	21st place	
IndieWire Critics Polls	December 16, 2019	Best First Feature	Booksmart	2nd place	
Los Angeles Online Film Critics Society	July 1, 2019	Best Picture	Booksmart	Won	
Los Angeles Online Film Critics Society	July 1, 2019	Best Actress	Beanie Feldstein	Runner-up	
Los Angeles Online Film Critics Society	July 1, 2019	Best Supporting Actress	Billie Lourd	Won	
Los Angeles Online Film Critics Society	July 1, 2019	Best Female Director	Olivia Wilde	Won	
Los Angeles Online Film Critics Society	July 1, 2019	Best Original Screenplay	Emily Halpern, Sarah Haskins, Susanna Fogel, and Katie Silberman	Won	
Los Angeles Online Film Critics Society	July 1, 2019	Best Indie Film	Booksmart	Won	
Online Film Critics Awards	January 6, 2020	Best Debut Feature	Olivia Wilde	Won	
Palm Springs International Film Festival	November 27, 2018	Directors to Watch	Olivia Wilde	Won	
The ReFrame Stamp	February 26, 2020	2019 Top 100-Grossing Narrative Feature Recipients	Booksmart	Won	
San Francisco International Film Festival	April 24, 2019	Best Narrative Feature	Booksmart	Won	
St. Louis Film Critics Association	December 15, 2019	Best Original Screenplay	Booksmart	Nominated	
St. Louis Film Critics Association	December 15, 2019	Best Comedy	Booksmart	Won	
Women Film Critics Circle	December 9, 2019	Best Movie about Women	Booksmart	Nominated	
Women Film Critics Circle	December 9, 2019	Best Movie by a Woman	Booksmart	Nominated	
Women Film Critics Circle	December 9, 2019	Best Woman Storyteller	Emily Halpern, Sarah Haskins, Susanna Fogel, and Katie Silberman	Nominated	
Women Film Critics Circle	December 9, 2019	Best Equality of the Sexes	Booksmart	Nominated	
Writers Guild of America Awards	February 1, 2020	Best Original Screenplay	Emily Halpern, Sarah Haskins, Susanna Fogel, and Katie Silberman	Nominated	
