= Sarah Haskins (comedian) =

American comedian (born 1979)

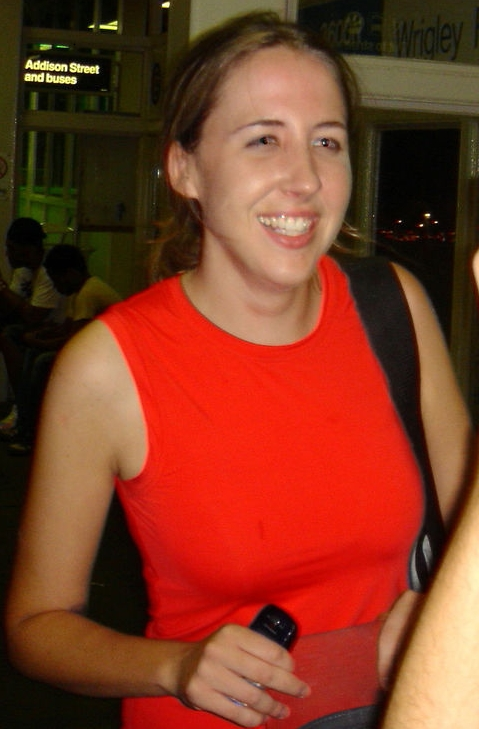
- Haskins in 2005
- Born: August 3, 1979 (age 47); Chicago, Illinois, United States

Comedy career
- Medium: Improvisational comedy, television, internet
- Genre: Satire
- Subjects: Feminism, popular culture, advertising, media

Sarah Haskins (born August 3, 1979) is an American comedian known for her satire about gender stereotypes in the media.

== Background and politics ==
A native of Chicago, Illinois, Haskins attended Francis W. Parker School in Chicago's Lincoln Park. A 2001 graduate of Harvard College, she was also a member of the improv comedy troupe The Immediate Gratification Players.

When asked if she is a feminist: "Yes, I’m a feminist. It is an extension of my lifelong war against pantyhose. To me it means that as women we are individuals before we are gendered people and that we’re not defined by our gender except in the ways we chose to appropriate that definition. We’re in a weird generation, right? Our moms were forced to grapple with that definition more immediately, and I think it’s changed as we’ve grown up. The core issue 'how do I fight bias against me because of my gender' is still there but has gotten more complicated and wrapped into all kinds of identity issues about how you present yourself as a woman and I pretty much think it's your choice. And fuck pantyhose."

A self-described liberal and feminist, she has spoken in interviews about the many traditional and new roles that women of the modern world are expected to fulfill: taking on new roles as career women and as financially independent individuals while still adhering to antiquated stereotypes about an ideal woman and her role in a traditional society.

== Career ==
Haskins majored in American history and literature at Harvard University. While at Harvard she began improvising with a group called IGP or "the Immediate Gratification Players." This inspired her interest in comedy. "Freshman year of college I saw a show at Second City called The Psychopath Not Taken. I loved it—I was doing improv at the time at school with a great group called IGP—and Psychopath expanded my sense of what comedy could do. It was funny, smart, and important.”

Haskins was an improvisational and sketch comedy performer at I.O. (ImprovOlympic) Chicago as well as with the Second City National Touring Company for six years before moving to California

In October 2007, she relocated to Los Angeles, where she currently resides. She worked as a full-time writer for Current TV and a regular contributor to the weekly series InfoMania on Current, a network co-founded by former Vice President Al Gore. Haskins wrote and starred in the InfoMania segment "Target Women" in which she commented on products, advertising, and media aimed at women. Segment topics have included: wedding shows, jewelry, cleaning supplies, Sarah Palin and the "lady vote", Twilight, cars and The View. The show's first episode, "Target Women: Yogurt", was an online hit.

Her comedy led to interviews with The Rumpus, Mother Jones, Jezebel, and The Paper Machete. Utne Reader named her one of "50 Visionaries Who Are Changing The World".

In January 2010, Haskins parted ways with Current TV, leaving her central role in the Target Women segment behind.

Despite positive reviews by critics, Haskins' sitcom project Trophy Wife aired for one season on ABC before being canceled. Haskins and Emily Halpern co-wrote the 2019 film Booksmart.

== Personal life ==
Haskins married writer Geoffrey Edwards, son of Blake Edwards and stepson of Julie Andrews, on August 6, 2010, and gave birth to a child in December 2010.
