= List of awards and nominations received by Shia LaBeouf =

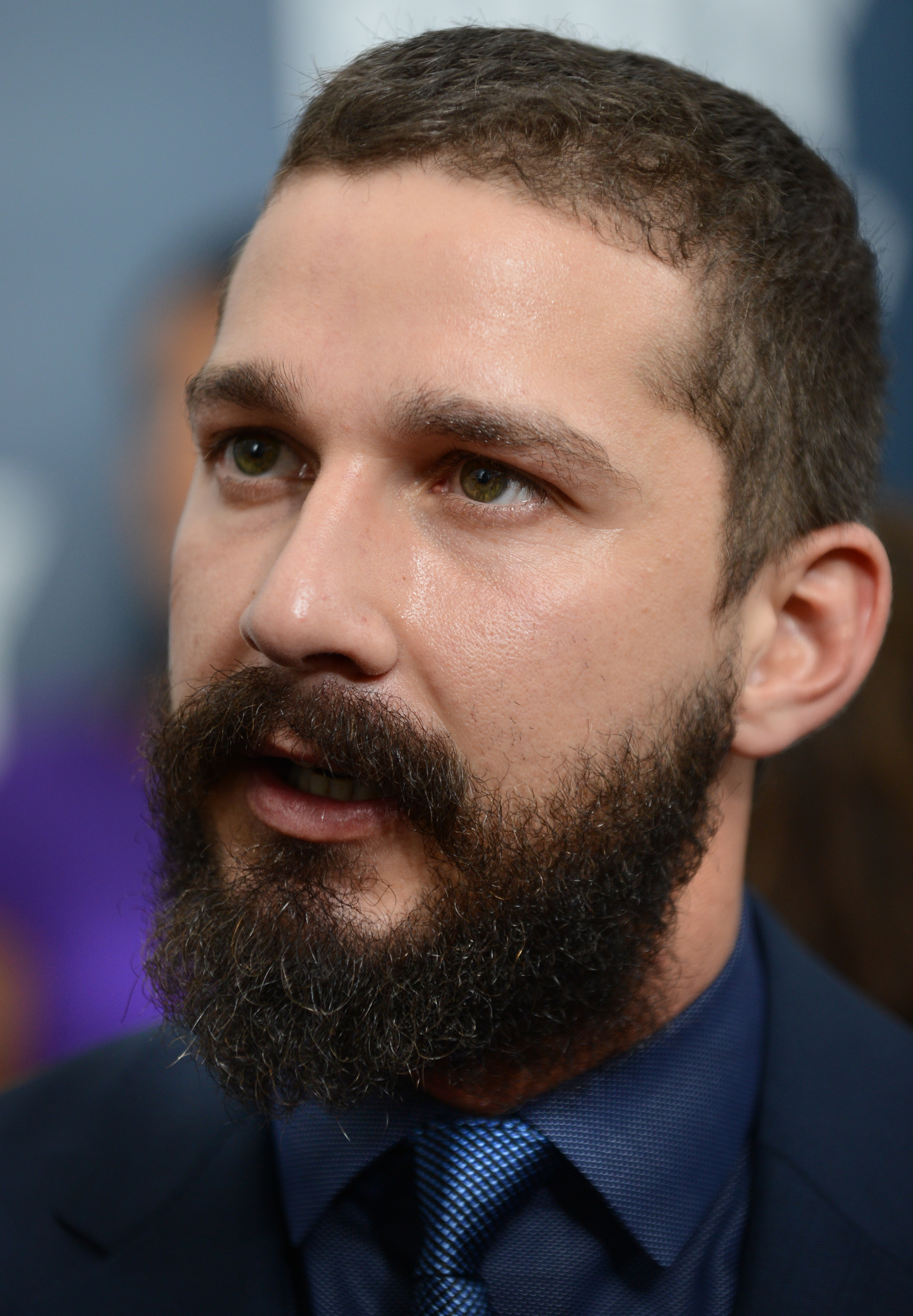
LaBeouf in 2014

This article is a list of awards and nominations received by Shia LaBeouf. LaBeouf is an American actor, performance artist, and filmmaker.

He has received various accolades including a BAFTA Award and a Daytime Emmy Award. He has also received nominations for two Independent Spirit Awards and a Screen Actors Guild Award. He directed the short film Let's Love Hate (2004) and later a short film titled Maniac (2011), starring American rappers Cage and Kid Cudi. Since 2014, LaBeouf has pursued a variety of public performance art projects with LaBeouf, Rönkkö & Turner.

He first gained prominence for his role as Louis Stevens in the Disney Channel series Even Stevens (2000-2003). He received the Daytime Emmy Award for Outstanding Performer in Children's Programming in 2003 for his performance. He received nine Teen Choice Award nominations, winning four times for Disturbia (2007), Indiana Jones and the Kingdom of the Crystal Skull (2008), and Transformers: Revenge of the Fallen (2009).

In 2008 he received the BAFTA Rising Star Award at the 61st British Academy Film Awards. He also received a Screen Actors Guild Award for Outstanding Performance by a Cast in a Motion Picture nomination for Bobby (2006). He also received two Independent Spirit Award for Best Supporting Male nominations for his performances in American Honey (2016), and Honey Boy (2019).

== Awards and nominations ==
Award	Year	Category	Film	Result	Notes
British Academy Film Awards	2008	Orange Rising Star Award	—N/a	Won	
British Independent Film Awards	2016	Best Actor	American Honey	Nominated	
Chicago Film Critics Association Awards	2019	Best Supporting Actor	Honey Boy	Nominated	
Chicago International Children's Film Festival	2004	Live-Action Short Film or Video (shared with Lorenzo Eduardo)	Let's Love Hate	Won	
Critics' Choice Movie Awards	2007	Best Acting Ensemble	Bobby	Nominated	
Dallas–Fort Worth Film Critics Association Awards	2019	Best Supporting Actor	Honey Boy	Runner-up	
Daytime Emmy Awards	2003	Outstanding Performer in a Children's Series	Even Stevens	Won	
DiscussingFilm Critic Awards	2019	Best Supporting Actor	Honey Boy	Nominated	
Florida Film Critics Circle Awards	2016	Best Ensemble (shared with the cast)	American Honey	Won	
Gijón International Film Festival	2006	Best Actor	A Guide to Recognizing Your Saints	Won	
Golden Raspberry Awards	2009	Worst Screen Couple (shared with Megan Fox)	Transformers: Revenge of the Fallen	Nominated	
Golden Raspberry Awards	2011	Worst Screen Couple (shared with Rosie Huntington-Whiteley)	Transformers: Dark of the Moon	Nominated	
Golden Raspberry Awards	2011	Worst Ensemble (shared with the cast)	Transformers: Dark of the Moon	Nominated	
Golden Raspberry Awards	2020	Worst Supporting Actor	The Tax Collector	Nominated	
Golden Raspberry Awards	2024	Worst Supporting Actor	Megalopolis	Nominated	
Golden Raspberry Awards	2024	Worst Screen Combo (shared with the cast)	Megalopolis	Nominated	
Golden Schmoes Awards	2007	Breakthrough Performance of the Year	Disturbia	Nominated	
Golden Schmoes Awards	2007	Favorite Celebrity of the Year	—N/a	Nominated	
Guldbagge Awards	2017	Best Supporting Actor	Borg McEnroe	Nominated	
Hollywood Critics Association	2019	Best Supporting Actor	Honey Boy	Nominated	
Hollywood Film Awards	2019	Breakthrough Screenwriter	Honey Boy	Won	
Hollywoods Life's Breakthrough of the Year Awards	2003	Breakthrough of the Year	The Battle of Shaker Heights	Won	
Hollywood Reel Independent Film Festival	2018	Best Experimental Film (shared with Nastja Säde Rönkkö and Luke Turner)	#TAKEMEANYWHERE	Won	
Independent Spirit Awards	2017	Best Supporting Male	American Honey	Nominated	
Independent Spirit Awards	2020	Best Supporting Male	Honey Boy	Nominated	
J-14's Teen Icon Awards	2011	Iconic Movie Actor	Transformers: Dark of the Moon	Nominated	
London Film Critics Circle Awards	2017	Supporting Actor of the Year	American Honey	Nominated	
London Film Critics Circle Awards	2020	Supporting Actor of the Year	Honey Boy	Nominated	
Marietta International Film Festival	2018	Best Short Film	#TAKEMEANYWHERE	Won	
Marietta International Film Festival	2018	Best Direction in a Short Film	#TAKEMEANYWHERE	Won	
MTV Movie Awards	2004	Best Breakthrough Male Performance	Holes	Nominated	
MTV Movie Awards	2008	Best Male Performance	Transformers	Nominated	
MTV Movie Awards	2008	Best Kiss (shared with Sarah Roemer)	Disturbia	Nominated	
MTV Movie Awards	2009	Best Male Performance	Eagle Eye	Nominated	
Music City Film Critics Association	2019	Best Supporting Actor	Honey Boy	Nominated	
National Board of Review	2014	Best Ensemble Cast	Fury	Won	
National Film Awards UK	2017	Best Actor	American Honey	Nominated	
National Movie Awards	2007	Best Performance - Male	Transformers	Nominated	
Nickelodeon Kids' Choice Awards	2010	Favorite Movie Actor	Transformers: Revenge of the Fallen	Nominated	
Nickelodeon Australian Kids' Choice Awards	2007	Fave Movie Star	—N/a	Nominated	
Nickelodeon UK Kids' Choice Awards	2008	Favourite Male Film Star	—N/a	Nominated	
North Carolina Film Critics Association	2019	Best Supporting Actor	Honey Boy	Nominated	
Online Association of Female Film Critics	2019	Best Supporting Male	Honey Boy	Won	
People's Choice Awards	2012	Favorite Action Movie Star	Transformers: Dark of the Moon	Nominated	
Red Dirt Film Festival	2018	Best Feature Screenplay	Honey Boy	Won	
Saturn Awards	2009	Best Supporting Actor	Indiana Jones and the Kingdom of the Crystal Skull	Nominated	
Scream Awards	2007	Scream King	Disturbia	Won	
Scream Awards	2007	Sci-Fi Star	Transformers	Won	
Scream Awards	2008	Best Supporting Performance	Indiana Jones and the Kingdom of the Crystal Skull	Nominated	
Scream Awards	2009	Best Science Fiction Actor	Transformers: Revenge of the Fallen	Nominated	
Screen Actors Guild Awards	2007	Outstanding Cast in a Motion Picture	Bobby	Nominated	
ShoWest	2007	Male Star of Tomorrow	—N/a	Won	
Spike Video Game Awards	2009	Best Performance By A Human Male	Transformers: Revenge of the Fallen	Nominated	
Sun Valley Film Festival	2020	High Scribe	Minor Modifications	Won	
Sundance Film Festival	2006	Best Ensemble Performance	A Guide to Recognizing Your Saints	Won	
Teen Choice Awards	2007	Choice Movie Breakout Male	Disturbia	Won	
Teen Choice Awards	2007	Choice Movie: Chemistry (shared with Bumblebee)	Transformers	Nominated	
Teen Choice Awards	2007	Choice Movie: Liplock (shared with Megan Fox)	Transformers	Nominated	
Teen Choice Awards	2007	Choice Movie: Horror/Thriller Actor	Disturbia	Won	
Teen Choice Awards	2008	Choice Movie Actor: Action	Indiana Jones and the Kingdom of the Crystal Skull	Won	
Teen Choice Awards	2008	Choice Male Red Carpet Fashion Icon	—N/a	Nominated	
Teen Choice Awards	2009	Choice Summer Movie Star: Male	Transformers: Revenge of the Fallen	Won	
Teen Choice Awards	2011	Choice Summer: Movie Actor	Transformers: Dark of the Moon	Nominated	
Teen Choice Awards	2011	Choice Movie: Actor Drama	Wall Street: Money Never Sleeps	Nominated	
Visual Effects Society Awards	2008	Outstanding Animated Character in an Animated Feature (shared with David Schaub, Pete Nash and James Crossley)	Surf's Up	Nominated	
WeScreenplay Feature Contest	2017	Best Screenplay Feature	Honey Boy	Won	
Young Artist Awards	2001	Outstanding Leading Young Actor: TV Series	Even Stevens	Nominated	
Young Artist Awards	2002	Outstanding Leading Young Actor: TV Series	Even Stevens	Nominated	
Young Artist Awards	2004	Best Leading Young Actor - Feature Film	Holes	Nominated	
Young Hollywood Awards	2007	Superstar of Tomorrow	—N/a	Won	
YoungStar Awards	2000	Best Young Actor in a Comedy Series	Even Stevens	Nominated	
