= The Clapper (film) =

- Theatrical release poster
- Directed by: Dito Montiel
- Screenplay by: Dito Montiel
- Based on: Eddie Krumble Is the Clapper by Dito Montiel
- Produced by: Mike Falbo; Ed Helms; Alex Lebovici; Dito Montiel; Steve Ponce; Robin Schorr
- Starring: Ed Helms; Amanda Seyfried; Tracy Morgan; Adam Levine; Mickey Gooch Jr.; Russell Peters
- Cinematography: Michael Barrett
- Edited by: Jake Pushinsky
- Music by: Jimmy Haun; David Wittman
- Production companies: Oriah Entertainment; Cedarvale Pictures; LTD Films; Pacific Electric Picture Company; Skit Bags
- Distributed by: Momentum Pictures
- Release dates: April 23, 2017 (Tribeca); January 26, 2018 (United States)
- Running time: 89 minutes
- Country: United States
- Language: English
- Box office: $6,961

The Clapper is a 2017 American comedy film written and directed by Dito Montiel, based on his novel Eddie Krumble Is the Clapper. It stars Ed Helms, Amanda Seyfried, Tracy Morgan, Adam Levine, Mickey Gooch Jr. and Russell Peters. It was the final film role of Alan Thicke, who died on December 13, 2016.

The film premiered at the Tribeca Film Festival on April 23, 2017, and was released on January 26, 2018 by Momentum Pictures.

== Plot ==
Eddie Krumble (Ed Helms) is a widowed contract actor who works as an audience member for infomercials, with his best friend Chris (Tracy Morgan). He also has a budding romance with Judy (Amanda Seyfried), a shy gas station attendant.

One day he gets noticed by Stillerman (Russell Peters), a late-night talk show host, because of his frequent appearances as a recurring audience member. He loses his job due to Stillerman's segments searching for "the Clapper". The Stillerman Show's hunt for Eddie also gets Judy fired and she appears to go missing.

Initially declining offers to appear on Stillerman's show without payment (there is a rule against paying guests), Eddie caves in, appearing on the show to find Judy. After, Eddie and Chris do several "Searching for Judy" segments on the show, which they are paid for. After a few such segments, Judy phones the network and tells Eddie on-air to stop "stalking" her. Fearing a lawsuit, the show ends these segments and cuts ties with Eddie and Chris.

Six months later, Eddie and Chris reappear on the show, as does Eddie's mother Ida (Brenda Vaccaro) berating Stillerman's treatment of her son. On air, Eddie admits that he misses his late wife and that he loves Judy, who sees the segment while she is pumping gas that night. As Eddie mentions on television where he'll be the next day, she finds him and tells him she loves him back. They subsequently marry in the closing credits.

== Cast ==
- Ed Helms as Eddie Krumble
- Amanda Seyfried as Judy
- Tracy Morgan as Chris
- Brenda Vaccaro as Ida Krumble
- PJ Byrne as Mr. Caldwell
- Leah Remini as Producer Louise
- Mickey Gooch Jr. as Yugoslavia
- Adam Levine as Ralph Ranter
- Russell Peters as Stillerman
- Alan Thicke as Himself
- Greg Vrotsos as Hercules
- Todd Giebenhain as Tambakis
- James Ransone as Darth Guy
- Vince Offer as Nailammer Spokesman
- Billy Blanks as Himself
- Wendy Braun as Wendy
- Richard Tanner as Spork-A-Plate Host
- Roger Guenveur Smith as Dr. Rogers B. Hay
- Mark Cuban as Himself
- Nico Santos as Buffet Person
- Robert Axelrod as Spider Parson (voice)
- Rob Gronkowski as Himself
- Sara Sampaio as Herself

== Production ==
In February 2016, it was announced Ed Helms and Amanda Seyfried would star in the film, with Dito Montiel directing the film from a screenplay he wrote, based on his novel of the same name. Helms and Mike Falbo would be producers under their Pacific Electric banner, with Robin Schoor. In April 2016, Tracy Morgan joined the cast, with Alex Lebovici and Michael Bien joining as an executive producer, and Steve Ponce as a producer under his Oriah Entertainment banner. In May 2016, Russell Peters joined the cast. In June 2016, Adam Levine, Leah Remini, P.J. Byrne, Mickey Gooch Jr. and Brenda Vaccaro joined the cast. Later that month, Mark Cuban, Rob Gronkowski and Sara Sampaio joined the cast. In July 2016, Wendy Braun joined the cast.

Filming began in June 2016.

== Release ==
The film premiered at the Tribeca Film Festival on April 23, 2017. Shortly after, Momentum Pictures and Netflix acquired distribution rights. It was released in a limited release and through video on demand on January 26, 2018 and on Netflix on May 1, 2018.

=== Critical response ===
On review aggregator website Rotten Tomatoes, the film holds an approval rating of 23% based on 26 reviews, with a weighted average of 4.3/10. The site's consensus reads: "The Clapper is tugged along by the valiant efforts of a talented cast, but it's ultimately not enough to make this wan romantic comedy worth a watch." On Metacritic, the film holds a weighted average score of 21 out of 100, based on 11 critics, indicating "generally unfavorable reviews".

=== Accolades ===
List of awards and nominations
Year	Award	Category	Recipient(s)	Result	Ref(s)
2019	Golden Raspberry Awards	Worst Actress	Amanda Seyfried	Nominated	
