= Howard Cantour.com =

- Film festival poster
- Directed by: Shia LaBeouf
- Written by: Shia LaBeouf
- Based on: Justin M. Damiano by Dan Clowes
- Produced by: Jeff Balis; Rhoades Rader; T.J. Sakasegawa
- Starring: Jim Gaffigan; Thomas Lennon; Portia Doubleday; Dito Montiel
- Cinematography: Matthew Irving
- Edited by: Shia LaBeouf
- Release dates: May 18, 2012 (Cannes Film Festival); December 17, 2013 (Online)
- Running time: 11 minutes
- Country: United States
- Language: English

Howard Cantour.com is a 2012 American short film directed by actor Shia LaBeouf. The short was shown at the Cannes Film Festival on May 18, 2012, followed by an online premiere on December 17, 2013. The short film follows the eponymous internet film critic Howard Cantour, who runs a website called HowardCantour.com. He was played by Jim Gaffigan. Howard Cantour.com was plagiarized from Justin M. Damiano, a comic by Dan Clowes, as the premise and much of the dialogue is identical, and LaBeouf took credit for the film but did not seek permission from Clowes or acknowledge Clowes in the film's credits.

== Synopsis ==
The film opens with Howard Cantour (Jim Gaffigan) reflecting on being a critic on his personal website, HowardCantour.com and how a review can either promote or devastate a film's chances of survival. The movie then cuts to a scene of Howard sitting in a restaurant with Dakota (Portia Doubleday), a young review critic. Howard is dismissive of her, saying that he wouldn't have bothered talking to her if she wasn't attractive. The two discuss an upcoming film preview and Dakota states that she believes that the two of them should help the movie out as the film's production company is not going to heavily promote it. Howard states that he hopes that the film fails, as he has grown jaded with how directors overall deal with reality in a film. He goes on to argue that he grew disgusted with the film's director, Holly Pondyoke (Dito Montiel), as he had filmed a scene in a previous film where a kid stole his mother's ring, which Howard believes was done only to show how horrible people can be.

Howard attends the film's preview, where he interacts with fellow online film critic Rocco (Thomas Lennon) and is told that only specific film critics (namely newspaper critics) will be allowed into the discussion with the director. Rocco disdainfully says that he thinks that the film's production company believes that the online film critics will treat the film like a newspaper critic would, meaning that they would review the film more positively. Dakota then approaches the two men and asks their opinion about the film, to which Rocco says that he would be posting a mixed review. He's surprised when Dakota says that Howard would be writing a negative review, as at one point Howard had given the director an overwhelmingly positive review. However it is this same review that gains Howard entrance into the discussion. He's nervous, but correctly assumes that the newspaper critics would try to commandeer the entire proceedings. Howard wishes that his younger self that had written the positive review were there and reminisces how he had written the review in order to impress his then-wife Ellen.

He leaves without talking to the director, only for Dakota to ask if he had asked the director about the shot that they had discussed earlier about the stolen ring. Dismayed that he did not talk to the director, Dakota brings him over. The director then explains that the film in question had a deleted scene that explained the reasons behind the scene, but Howard doubts the truthfulness of this claim. Howard debates over whether or not to post his scathing review and briefly thinks about how his wife Ellen left him before ultimately choosing to upload his review.

== Cast ==
- Jim Gaffigan as Howard Cantour
- Thomas Lennon as Rocco Eppley
- Portia Doubleday as Dakota
- Dito Montiel as Holly Pondyoke
- Caroline Morahan as Abigail
- Josh Alfieri as Mr. Baldwin / Press
- Skoti Collins as British Film Critic'
- Sarah Hester as Press
- Colin Molloy as Round Table Critic / Press Junket
- Spencer Nicholson as Film Crew Electrician
- Heidi Neidermayer as Courtney
- Caitlin O'Connor as Concession Stand Girl
- Caileigh Scott as Video Game Girl
- Lynn Walsh as Round Table Critic / Press Junket
- Mir Wave as Press Critic

== Plagiarism ==
Shortly after the film's online release, bloggers and newspapers familiar with indie comics noticed its resemblance to Justin M. Damiano, a 2007 comic by Ghost World author Daniel Clowes from the anthology The Book of Other People. Wired noted the similarities between the film and the comic, writing:

How closely does the film, which appeared at several film festivals, hew to the comic? Well, both open with exactly the same monologue from their eponymous leads: "A critic is a warrior, and each of us on the battlefield have the means to glorify or demolish (whether a film, a career, or an entire philosophy) by influencing perception in ways that if heartfelt and truthful, can have far-reaching repercussions." Both stories then switch to a scene wherein the titular critic discusses a film with a freelance critic he dislikes, who asks whether he's attending a junket where the director will be present. In Clowes', the freelance critic explains that the director "so perfectly gets how we're really all like these aliens who can never have any meaningful contact with each other because we're all so caught up in our own little self-made realities, you know?" In LaBeouf's short, she says the director "so perfectly gets how we're all like these aliens to one another, who never have any meaningful contact with one another because we're all so caught up in our little self-made realities, you know?

— Graeme McMillan, Wired

LaBeouf removed Howard Cantour.com from his website, claiming that he was not copying Clowes, but rather was inspired by him and "got lost in the creative process." He later issued several apologies to Clowes via Twitter, who responded by saying that "The first I ever heard of the film was this morning when someone sent me a link. I've never spoken to or met Mr. LaBeouf ... I actually can't imagine what was going through his mind." The A.V. Club remarked on the apology, which they found was identical to a Yahoo! Answers post on the subject of plagiarism posted in 2010. This raised allegations about further plagiarism on LaBeouf's part, as various sites noted that some of LaBeouf's other works appear to have been copied without attribution and that further apologetic tweets from LaBeouf appeared to have been fashioned after unrelated apologies by other public figures. A lawyer for Clowes later issued a cease and desist letter to LaBeouf through his lawyer, which LaBeouf later posted on Twitter.

== Reception ==
Upon its initial premiere at the 2012 Cannes Film Festival Howard Cantour.com received a large amount of critical acclaim. IndieWire posted a review that stated that the film was "ultimately a surprisingly successful movie on the experience of watching a movie that should only serve to encourage LaBeouf to further test the directorial waters". Howard Cantour.com also received some praise when it was released to the Internet, but has since experienced a backlash due to LaBeouf's plagiarism of Clowes' comic.
