= LaBeouf, Rönkkö & Turner =

Performance artist trio

LaBeouf, Rönkkö & Turner is an artist trio consisting of American actor and artist Shia LaBeouf, Finnish artist Nastja Säde Rönkkö, and British artist Luke Turner. They are performance artists.

== Background ==
Turner first gained recognition for his work on the web in the late 1990s. He later began collaborating with Rönkkö after the two met at London's Central Saint Martins, where they both graduated in Fine Art in 2008. Turner completed an MA at the Royal College of Art in 2010, while Rönkkö earned a Masters at Slade School of Fine Art, and both established themselves as solo artists.

LaBeouf began acting in the early 2000s with his role in the Disney Channel series Even Stevens, before going on to feature in a number of Hollywood films such as the Transformers and Indiana Jones series.

In 2011, Turner authored The Metamodernist Manifesto, defining metamodernism as "the mercurial condition between and beyond irony and sincerity, naivety and knowingness, relativism and truth, optimism and doubt, in pursuit of a plurality of disparate and elusive horizons," and concluding with a call to "go forth and oscillate!" LaBeouf reached out to Turner in early 2014 after reading the manifesto. At the time, LaBeouf was involved in a plagiarism controversy after using the work of graphic novelist Daniel Clowes without credit in his 2012 short film, Howard Cantour.com. Turner subsequently introduced LaBeouf to Rönkkö, and the trio began their collaboration, embarking on a series of actions described by Dazed as "a multi-platform meditation on celebrity and vulnerability."

== Works ==
=== Early works / #IAMSORRY, 2014 ===
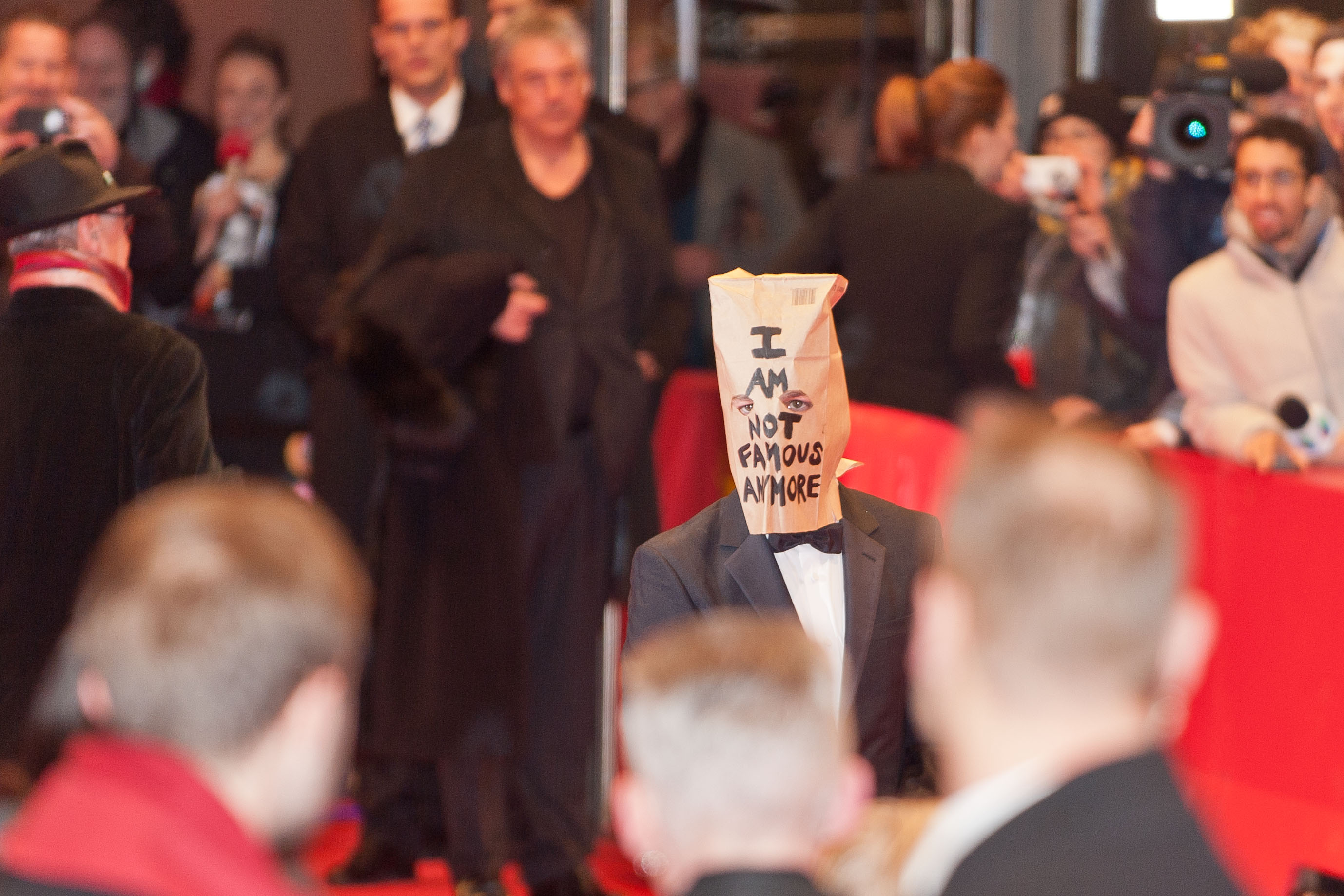
LaBeouf at the 2014 Berlin Film Festival

On February 9, 2014, the trio caused controversy at the Berlin Film Festival where LaBeouf arrived at the red carpet wearing a brown paper bag over his head with the words "I AM NOT FAMOUS ANYMORE" written on it. Earlier that day, he had walked out of a press conference for Nymphomaniac, quoting French footballer Eric Cantona's famous "seagulls" statement: "When the seagulls follow the trawler, it is because they think sardines will be thrown into the sea."

Two days later, LaBeouf, Rönkkö & Turner staged a six-day performance in a Los Angeles gallery entitled #IAMSORRY, in which LaBeouf sat wearing a tuxedo and the paper bag, silently crying in front of visitors for 24 hours straight. Attendees were allowed to enter one at a time and invited to choose an item from a table of objects to take in with them. Time columnist Joel Stein, who spent three days waiting in line to see the performance, observed that LaBeouf "was immensely present" and that "he was whatever was projected upon him," while Kate Knibbs of The Daily Dot found the experience "genuinely disturbing" and "felt like I was further dehumanizing someone whose humanity I'd discounted." The Daily Beast's Andrew Romano stated "there was more going on in those few seconds than in a lot of contemporary art. LaBeouf's look-at-me Internet penance ritual had become an actual moment between actual people."

In a conversation conducted via email as part of the trio's #INTERVIEW piece the following November, LaBeouf said that he was "heartbroken" and "genuinely remorseful and full of shame and guilt" at the start of #IAMSORRY, but that "in the end I felt cared for however it came—it was beautiful, it blew me away." He revealed, however, that one woman had proceeded to sexually assault him during the February performance, while Rönkkö and Turner later clarified that they had prevented the assault by intervening as soon as they were aware of the incident starting to occur.

The day after their #IAMSORRY performance concluded, LaBeouf, Rönkkö & Turner arranged for skywriting to display the message "#STARTCREATING" over Los Angeles. This was in contrast to a similar skywriting message, "#STOPCREATING", that LaBeouf had made the previous month in reference to a cease and desist letter Clowes's lawyer had sent him.

In May 2014, in a piece by the trio entitled Meditation for Narcissists, LaBeouf jumped rope for an hour via a live Skype link at London's Auto Italia South East. During the performance, he invited the audience to use ropes provided in the gallery and "join me on my quest to find my inner self." Dazed's Aimee Cliff reported that the performance's attendees "all gave off an air of self-consciousness that came not from watching themselves in a digital mirror, but from being under the gaze of someone who is usually—constantly—under the gaze of the public." In September 2014, the artists staged #METAMARATHON, a "collaborative marathon" at the Stedelijk Museum Amsterdam, completing a 144-lap circuit around the perimeter of the museum while a symposium on metamodernism took place inside.

=== #FOLLOWMYHEART, 2015 ===
In March 2015, during SXSW in Austin, Texas, the trio transmitted LaBeouf's heartbeat online for six days, with a website streaming audio and a real-time graphic of his beating heart. Described as "an exploration of just how intimate digital space can get," the artists characterized the piece as a "reminder of our collective humanity." Vulture called the experience of tuning in to the work "strangely mesmerizing," while Dazed observed that "what's interesting about this piece is that it might be the minimal amount of information required in order to get that sense of someone as a subject," noting that "it's the temporal immediacy that is very striking."

=== #INTRODUCTIONS, 2015 ===
In May 2015, LaBeouf, Rönkkö & Turner released #INTRODUCTIONS, a half-hour video made in collaboration with Central Saint Martins Fine Art students, comprising a series of short monologues performed by LaBeouf in front of a green screen. Each student had been instructed to provide the artists with a script to introduce their work, and the resulting footage was released under a Creative Commons license, enabling the public to freely adapt and remix it. One segment, written by Joshua Parker, in the form of an exaggerated motivational speech dubbed "Just Do It" after the Nike slogan, became an Internet meme after going viral within days of being released, spawning numerous remixes and parodies, and becoming the most searched for GIF of 2015 according to Google.

=== #ALLMYMOVIES, 2015 ===
In November 2015, the trio invited the public to join LaBeouf in person at New York's Angelika Film Center as he watched all his movies consecutively, in reverse chronological order, over the course of three days. At the same time, a camera focused on LaBeouf's face was live streamed online throughout the performance. Rolling Stone's David Ehrlich called the piece "a work of genius," and noted that "sitting a few feet behind [LaBeouf] and watching him stare up at his own gargantuan reflection, his method finally began to make sense of his madness." Tasha Robinson of The Verge noted that "over the course of three days, the initial bafflement was largely replaced with enthusiasm," with the appeal of the work being the "sense of voyeurism, that ability to see people in a vulnerable state," adding that "no matter how abnormal the installation itself was, the normalcy of his presence, largely unchanging from hour to hour, was lulling."

=== #TOUCHMYSOUL, 2015 ===
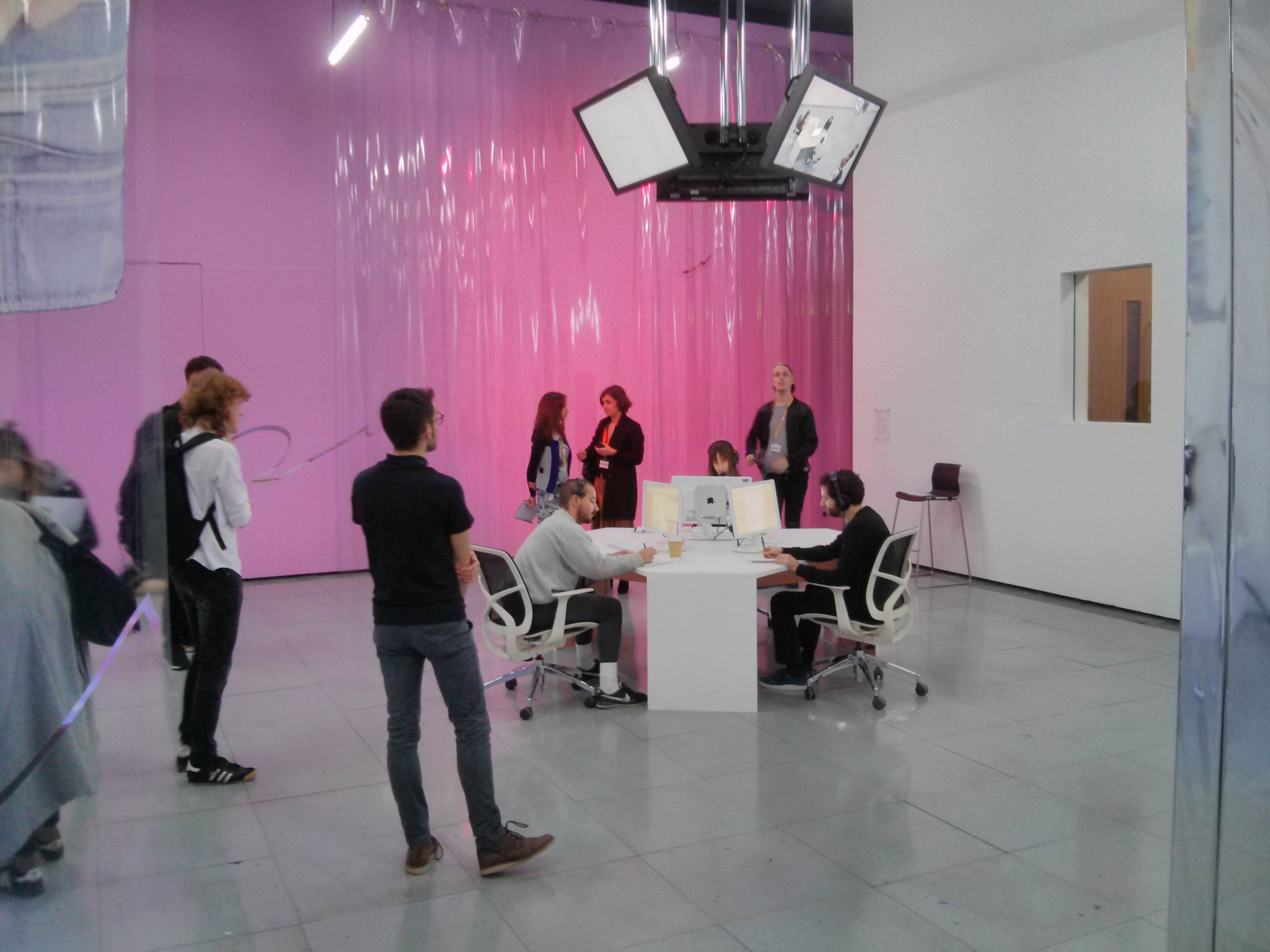
LaBeouf, Rönkkö & Turner during #TOUCHMYSOUL at FACT, 2015

In December 2015, Liverpool's Foundation for Art and Creative Technology hosted a four-day performance in which the artists manned a phone line inside the gallery and fielded calls from strangers around the world, asking each of them: "Can you touch my soul?" Visitors to the gallery were only able to hear one side of the telephone calls, while the trio typed up their conversations over a publicly available Google Doc shared live on the project's website, alongside a video feed of the installation. Over the course of the performance they took over one thousand calls, which Rönkkö later reflected had moved the artists "with their sweet energy, laughter, singing, silence, life stories, emotions." At the conclusion of the project, Rönkkö tattooed LaBeouf's forearm with the words: "You. Now. Wow."; words that had emerged from a conversation with a caller from Egypt. Writing in The Conversation, Beatriz Garcia observed that "at the heart of this performance was a fascinating paradox about the nature of authenticity, fame and personal connection that no visitor can escape."

=== #TAKEMEANYWHERE, 2016 ===
In May 2016, the trio embarked on a month-long project during which they would post their GPS coordinates online and wait for strangers to pick them up and take them anywhere, with the project's website tracking their course on a map in real time. Turner said of the project, "we're all putting our trust in the collective, in the networks—they're deciding, they're determining what unfolds," while LaBeouf called it "the most expansive and most intimate thing we've done." The work, commissioned by Boulder Museum of Contemporary Art and The Finnish Institute in London, saw them transported across North America, starting in Colorado and travelling through Canada, before eventually ending up in Alaska.

=== #ANDINTHEEND, 2016 ===
In December 2016, the trio staged a performance at the Sydney Opera House over two successive nights, inviting participants one by one to deliver a message to them inside the otherwise empty theatre, with the only request being that their message began with the words "And in the end..." These messages were then recited by either LaBeouf, Rönkkö, or Turner, broadcast via livestream, and displayed on a 60-metre-long LED ticker installed on the exterior of the Opera House. The Guardian's Roslyn Helper called the artists' invitation "a brilliant question, one that asks the thinker to reduce everything down to its essential elements and helps spur on the four hours of waiting in a meditative sort of haze," while Dazed's Ashleigh Kane noted that the project elicited responses ranging "from the irreverent, self-centred and quizzical, to the serious, heartbreaking, and pensive."

=== HEWILLNOTDIVIDE.US, 2017 – 2021 ===
The "He Will Not Divide Us" Logo

At 9 a.m. on January 20, 2017, the trio launched HEWILLNOTDIVIDE.US, a participatory performance installation to coincide with the inauguration of Donald Trump as United States President. A camera was set up on a wall outside the Museum of the Moving Image in New York, with the words "He Will Not Divide Us" written directly above. Passersby were invited to deliver these words into the camera "as many times, and for as long as they wish," in what the artists described as "a show of resistance or insistence, opposition or optimism, guided by the spirit of each individual participant and the community." The footage was live-streamed on a 24/7 feed, which the artists announced would run for four years, or the duration of Trump's presidency. Jaden Smith was one of the earliest participants in the project.

Speaking to an Associated Press reporter in front of the livestream camera, LaBeouf stated that "we're anti-division out here. Everyone's invited," while Indiewire noted that "the project is a melting pot of ages, races, genders, sexualities, and beliefs, and it's fascinating how the five words became a mantra and took on lives of their own." The Week called the piece "the first great art of the Trump era," while Dazed described the experience of watching the stream as "a simple and much-needed reminder, likely delivered by an absolute stranger, that resistance and unity are unwavering." Reporting by Lisa Di Venuta for VICE described HWNDU as an "astonishingly successful work. It had captured the essence of human nature...sure, the essence of human nature turned out to be the sort of thing that a museum couldn’t actually tolerate—but if you went down there when it was going on, as I did, you would have found something special."

On February 10, 2017, the Museum of the Moving Image announced that it had ceased its involvement with the project, citing public safety concerns. The museum's statement claimed that "the installation had become a flashpoint for violence and was disrupted from its original intent." The exhibit had become a target for confrontations by neo-Nazis, white supremacists, and 4chan trolls. LaBeouf, Rönkkö & Turner, meanwhile, clarified that although the museum had "abandoned" the project, "the artists, however, have not." They issued a statement accusing the Museum of the Moving Image of not listening to their concerns regarding the hate speech that occurred, and claimed that the museum had "bowed to political pressure" in ceasing their involvement with the project, adding that there had been no incidents of violence that they were aware of, despite LaBeouf's arrest for assaulting a 25-year-old man on live-stream on January 25, 2017. They also alleged that the lawyer who informed them of the museum's decision also represents President Trump, and the trio concluded that the museum was "not fit to speak of [their] intent as artists."

On February 18, 2017, the live stream resumed, with the installation relocated to a wall outside the El Rey Theater in Albuquerque, New Mexico. On February 23, 2017, the stream was taken down again, this time at the behest of the artists, due to gunshots reported in the area. A man was reciting poetry into the camera in the early hours of the morning when gunshots could be heard on the stream. Though the shots were reportedly unrelated to the project, the trio stated via Twitter that they had taken down the stream as "the safety of everybody participating in our project is paramount."

On March 8, 2017, the stream resumed from an "unknown location", with the artists announcing that a flag emblazoned with the words "He Will Not Divide Us" would be flown for the duration of the presidency. The camera was pointed up at the flag, set against a backdrop of nothing but sky. Reporting on the move, Nylon reflected that "in tumultuous times like these, it's encouraging to see that art finds a way to exist and artists find a way to create, even when their work and message are under attack." Within 38 hours of resuming transmission, the flag was located by a collaboration of 4chan users, who used airplane trails, flight tracking, celestial navigation, and other techniques to determine that it was located in Greeneville. In the early hours of March 10, 2017, a 4chan user from the /pol/ board took down and stole the flag, replacing it with a red 'Make America Great Again' hat and a Pepe shirt. These were later removed, and the stream continued broadcasting an empty flag pole. Following escalating threats coordinated via 4chan and 8chan, and after a field at the location was set on fire, the artists were again forced to relocate the project.

On March 22, 2017, the stream resumed, depicting a new "He Will Not Divide Us" flag being flown on the roof of the Foundation for Art and Creative Technology (FACT) in Liverpool, England. Commenting on the new location, the trio stated that "events have shown that America is simply not safe enough for this artwork to exist." On the next day, individuals gained access to the roof of the five-story building, and on police advice, FACT and the artists removed the installation "due to dangerous, illegal trespassing from far-right trolls." On October 16, 2017, Le Lieu unique in Nantes, France, adopted the project, with the flag flying at the top of the landmark building's tower. In the early hours of October 25, 2017, vandals from 4chan unsuccessfully attempted to set fire to the flag using a flaming drone, before crashing the remotely-piloted aircraft.

On June 8, 2018, the work was installed at Muzeum Sztuki, Łódź, for the exhibition 'Peer-to-Peer. Collective Practices in New Art'. On October 29, 2018, the Le Lieu Unique in Nantes, France, readopted the project. Because of normal wear and tear (the flag wasn't replaced according to the artists' will), only a fragment of the flag was still flying.

On January 20, 2021, the work was concluded following the end of Donald Trump's term as president. The live-stream ended at 12 p.m. EST once President Joe Biden had been inaugurated.

=== #ALONETOGETHER, 2017 ===
In April 2017, LaBeouf, Rönkkö & Turner spent one month isolated in three separate remote cabins in Finnish Lapland, with their only means of communication being a Dailymotion video link to a cabin inside Helsinki's Kiasma Museum. Visitors to the museum were able to speak to the three artists via this link, but the trio could only communicate with the visitors by text, and not with each other. The project's website live-streamed a view of the gallery, relaying the artists' texts in real time, without attribution or context, creating what The Verge described as an interesting "one-sided disconnect." Over the course of the month, a group of regular attendees formed around the performance, returning to the museum cabin on a daily basis to connect with the artists and each other on a "deep, meaningful level," in what one participant described as a "healing, transforming experience."

== Talks ==
Since 2014, LaBeouf, Rönkkö & Turner have engaged in a number of talks and lectures, including at London College of Fashion, in which LaBeouf read passages from Guy Debord's 1967 Situationist work The Society of the Spectacle, and at Radboud University Nijmegen, where they presented a talk on metamodernism via Skype. In February 2016, during a performative talk at the Oxford Union, the trio spent 24 hours occupying an elevator (#ELEVATE), engaging with students and members of the public for the duration, and stopping only to give a conventional hour-long talk in the Union debating chamber midway through. Their interactions inside the elevator were simultaneously broadcast inside the debating chamber and online via livestream.
