= Shia LaBeouf =

American actor (born 1986)

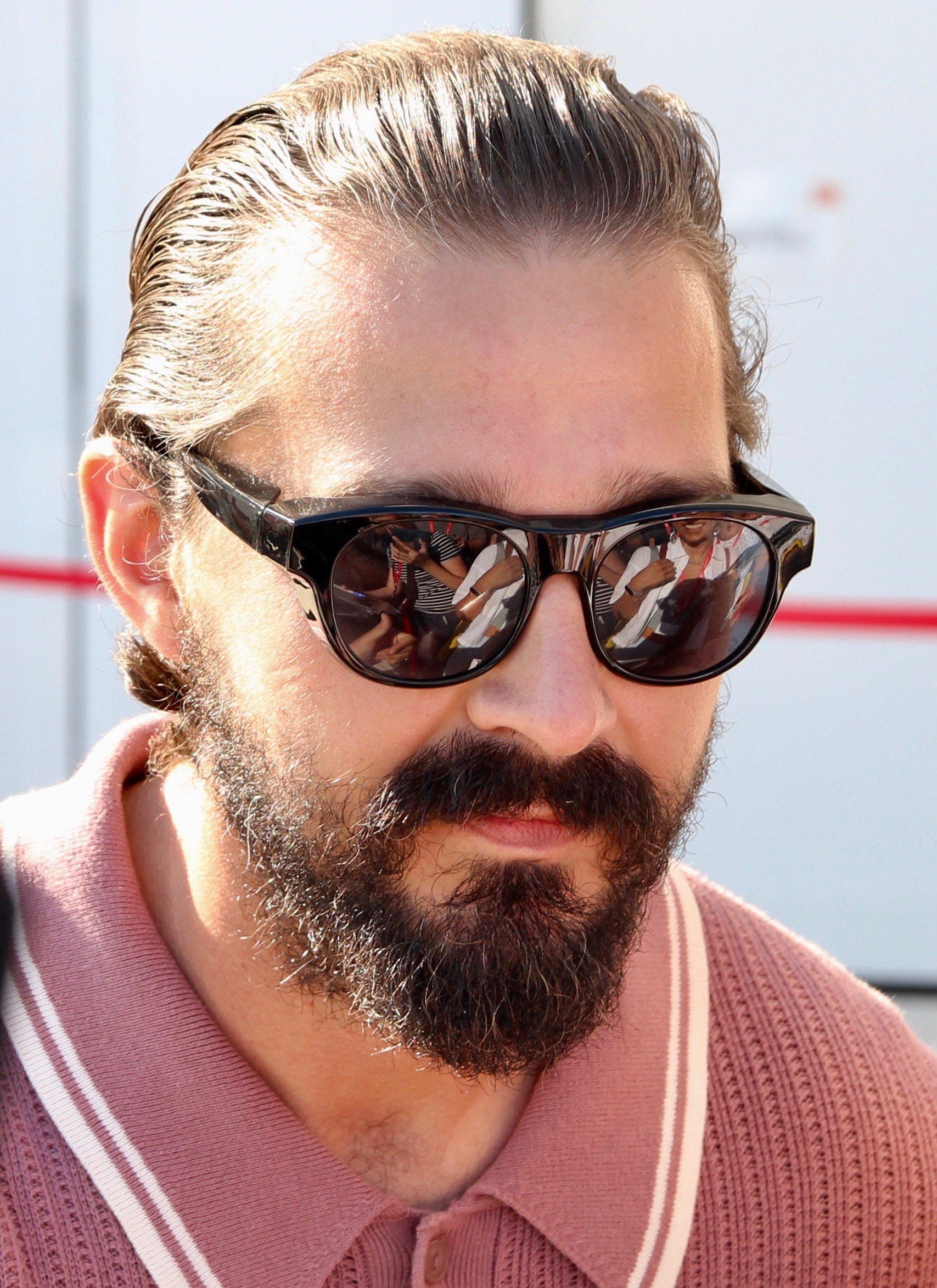
- LaBeouf in 2022
- Born: Shia Saide LaBeouf; June 11, 1986 (age 40); Los Angeles, California, U.S.
- Occupations: Actor; filmmaker; performance artist
- Years active: 1996–present
- Children: 1
- Awards: Full list

Shia Saide LaBeouf (/ˈʃaɪ.ə ləˈbʌf/ SHY-ə lə-BUF; born June 11, 1986) is an American actor and filmmaker. His accolades include a BAFTA Award and Daytime Emmy Award.

LaBeouf began his acting career at a young age, appearing in small roles on television. His breakthrough came as Louis Stevens in the Disney Channel series Even Stevens (2000–2003), before he transitioned to film with starring roles in Holes (2003) and The Greatest Game Ever Played (2005). LaBeouf subsequently starred in a string of commercially successful films, including Disturbia (2007), Surf's Up (2007), Indiana Jones and the Kingdom of the Crystal Skull (2008), Eagle Eye (2008), and Wall Street: Money Never Sleeps (2010). He also starred as Sam Witwicky in the first three Transformers films (2007–2011), which collectively grossed over $2 billion worldwide.

Over the next decades, LaBeouf experienced career setbacks amid multiple controversies and legal issues. He continued acting and starred in independent films, earning praise for his performances in American Honey (2016), Borg vs McEnroe (2017), Honey Boy (2019), The Peanut Butter Falcon (2019), Pieces of a Woman (2020), and Salvable (2025). As a director, LaBeouf's credits include short films and music videos. He has also pursued a variety of public performance art projects with LaBeouf, Rönkkö & Turner since 2014.

== Early life ==
Shia Saide LaBeouf was born on June 11, 1986, in Los Angeles, California, the only child of visual artist, jewelry designer and dancer Shayna Saide and professional clown Jeffrey LaBeouf. His mother died of heart failure in August 2022. LaBeouf's mother was Jewish, and his Cajun father is Christian. He has stated that he was raised around "both sides" — he was baptized and had a bar mitzvah. One of the camps he attended was Christian. He embraced the Catholic faith in 2022.

LaBeouf has described his parents as "hippies", his father as "tough as nails and a different breed of man", and his upbringing as similar to a "hippy lifestyle", stating that his parents were "pretty weird people, but they loved me and I loved them." His parents eventually divorced, mainly owing to financial problems, and LaBeouf had what he has described as a "good childhood", growing up poor in Echo Park with his mother, who worked selling fabrics and brooches. LaBeouf's uncle was going to adopt him at one stage because his parents could not afford to have him anymore and "they had too much pride to go on welfare or food stamps." As a way of dealing with his parents' divorce, he would perform for his family, mimicking his father.

LaBeouf has stated that during his childhood, his father was "on drugs" and was placed in drug rehabilitation for heroin addiction, while LaBeouf's mother was "trying to hold down the fort." During a period when his father was in rehab for his addictions, when LaBeouf was around the age of 10, he overheard his mother being raped by a stranger in their home.

Labeouf then lived with his father from the age of 12 while he was filming Even Stevens, with his father serving as his on-set guardian. During this time, he accompanied his father to meetings of Alcoholics Anonymous. LaBeouf has also said he was subjected to abuse by his father, who once pointed a gun at his son during a Vietnam War flashback. LaBeouf remains close to and financially supports his father, as he did for his mother until her death.

He attended 32nd Street School/USC Magnet, which comprises 32nd St USC Visual & Performing Arts Magnet (kindergarten - 5th grade) and LAUSD/USC Media Arts and Engineering (6th - 12th grade), in Los Angeles (LAUSD) and Alexander Hamilton High School, although he received most of his education from tutors. In an interview, LaBeouf said that, looking back on his childhood, he feels grateful and considers some of those memories as scars.

== Career ==
=== 1996–2006: Career beginnings and Even Stevens ===
Prior to acting, LaBeouf practiced comedy around his neighborhood as an "escape" from a hostile environment. At age 10, he began performing stand-up at The Improv, describing his appeal as having "disgustingly dirty" material and a "50-year-old mouth on the 10-year-old kid." He subsequently found an agent through the Yellow Pages and was taken on after pretending to be his own manager. LaBeouf has said that he initially became an actor because his family was broke, not because he wanted to pursue an acting career, having originally gotten the idea from a child actor he met who had things he wanted.

In 2000, LaBeouf began to become known among young audiences by playing Louis Stevens on the Disney Channel weekly program Even Stevens, a role that later earned him a Daytime Emmy Award. He has said that "[he] grew up on that show" and being cast was the "best thing" that happened to him. In 2003, he appeared in the film Holes (2003), which received praise. In 2005, he co-starred in Constantine, playing the role of Chas Kramer, with Keanu Reeves in the starring role. The same year he provided the voice of Asbel in the Disney-produced English dub of Nausicaä of the Valley of the Wind. LaBeouf made his directorial debut with the short film Let's Love Hate with Lorenzo Eduardo. He has played real-life people, including golfer Francis Ouimet and the younger version of Dito Montiel in A Guide to Recognizing Your Saints (2006).

=== 2007–2011: Breakthrough and big-budget films ===
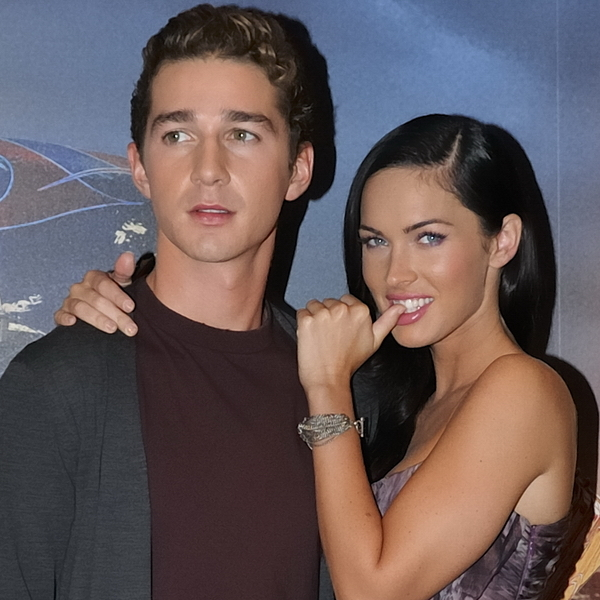
LaBeouf with co-star Megan Fox at the Transformers press conference in Paris in June 2009

LaBeouf starred in Disturbia, a thriller released on April 13, 2007, as a teenager under house arrest who suspects that his neighbor is a serial killer, which he considered a "character-driven" role. He received positive reviews for the role, with The Buffalo News writing that he "is able to simultaneously pull off [the character's] anger, remorse and intelligence". He hosted Saturday Night Live on April 14, 2007, and returned the following season to host the episode that aired on May 10, 2008.

LaBeouf starred in the 2007 science fiction film Transformers opposite Megan Fox. He played the lead character, Sam Witwicky, a man involved in the conflict between Autobots and Decepticons. The film succeeded at the box office, beginning a film franchise. In Indiana Jones and the Kingdom of the Crystal Skull (2008), LaBeouf portrayed Indiana Jones' greaser son, Mutt Williams. Stephanie Zachaek of Salon deemed his performance "appealing enough" and wrote that he "sensibly keeps his performance as low-key as possible". LaBeouf told the Los Angeles Times that he felt he as an actor "dropped the ball" on Jones' legacy, and "there was a reason" the film was not universally accepted.

His next film was Eagle Eye, released on September 26, 2008. Josh Bell of Las Vegas Weekly said he "makes a credible bid for action-hero status, although his occasional stabs at emotional depth don't really go anywhere." In February 2009, LaBeouf made his music video directorial debut, directing the video for "I Never Knew You", a single by American rapper Cage, from his third album Depart from Me (2009). It was shot in Los Angeles and features several cameo appearances from Cage's Definitive Jux label-mates. Through Cage, LaBeouf met Kid Cudi. All three of them later worked on a short film titled Maniac (2011), which was inspired by the song of the same name from Cudi's second album Man on the Moon II: The Legend of Mr. Rager (2010). Aside from directing the short film, LaBeouf directed the music video for Kid Cudi's song "Marijuana", which he filmed at the 2010 Cannabis Cup.

He appeared in the Oliver Stone-directed film Wall Street: Money Never Sleeps (2010), the sequel to Wall Street (1987). In this, LaBeouf played an ambitious Wall Street trader. The Hollywood Reporter named LaBeouf as one of the young male actors who are "pushing – or being pushed" into taking over Hollywood as the new "A-List".

LaBeouf reprised the role of Sam Witwicky in the 2009 sequel to Transformers, Transformers: Revenge of the Fallen. Filming took place in 2008. Due to LaBeouf's injury from his car accident, director Michael Bay and screenwriter Roberto Orci had to rewrite the script to protect his hand throughout filming. LaBeouf said production was only delayed two days after his accident because Bay made up for it by filming second unit scenes, and LaBeouf recovered a few weeks earlier than expected, allowing him to return to the set. Near the end of filming, LaBeouf injured his eye when he hit a prop; the injury required several stitches. He resumed filming two hours later. While commercially successful, Transformers: Revenge of the Fallen garnered negative reviews from critics, with LaBeouf sharing a nomination for the "Worst Screen Couple of 2009" Razzie Award with "either Megan Fox or any Transformer." He returned to star in Transformers: Dark of the Moon, the third installment in the film series, released in June 2011. It received mixed reviews, became the tenth film to gross over $1 billion, and marked LaBeouf's final time starring in a Transformers film.

=== 2012–present: Subsequent career ===
In June 2012, Icelandic band Sigur Rós released a music video for the song "Fjögur Píanó". It depicts "a man and woman locked in a never-ending cycle of addiction and desire", in which LaBeouf stars and appears nude. In 2012, Rob Cantor of Tally Hall produced a song describing LaBeouf as a murderous cannibal. In 2014, Cantor produced a music video based on this song. Despite the lyrics, the intent was humorous and non-serious, and LaBeouf appeared at the end of the video, applauding.

LaBeouf has created three short graphic novels Stale N Mate, Cyclical, and Let's Fucking Party, and a webcomic series, Cheek Up's through the publishing company, The Campaign Book. In April 2012, he promoted them at Chicago Comic & Entertainment Expo. In the same year, LaBeouf played a bootlegger in John Hillcoat's crime drama Lawless.

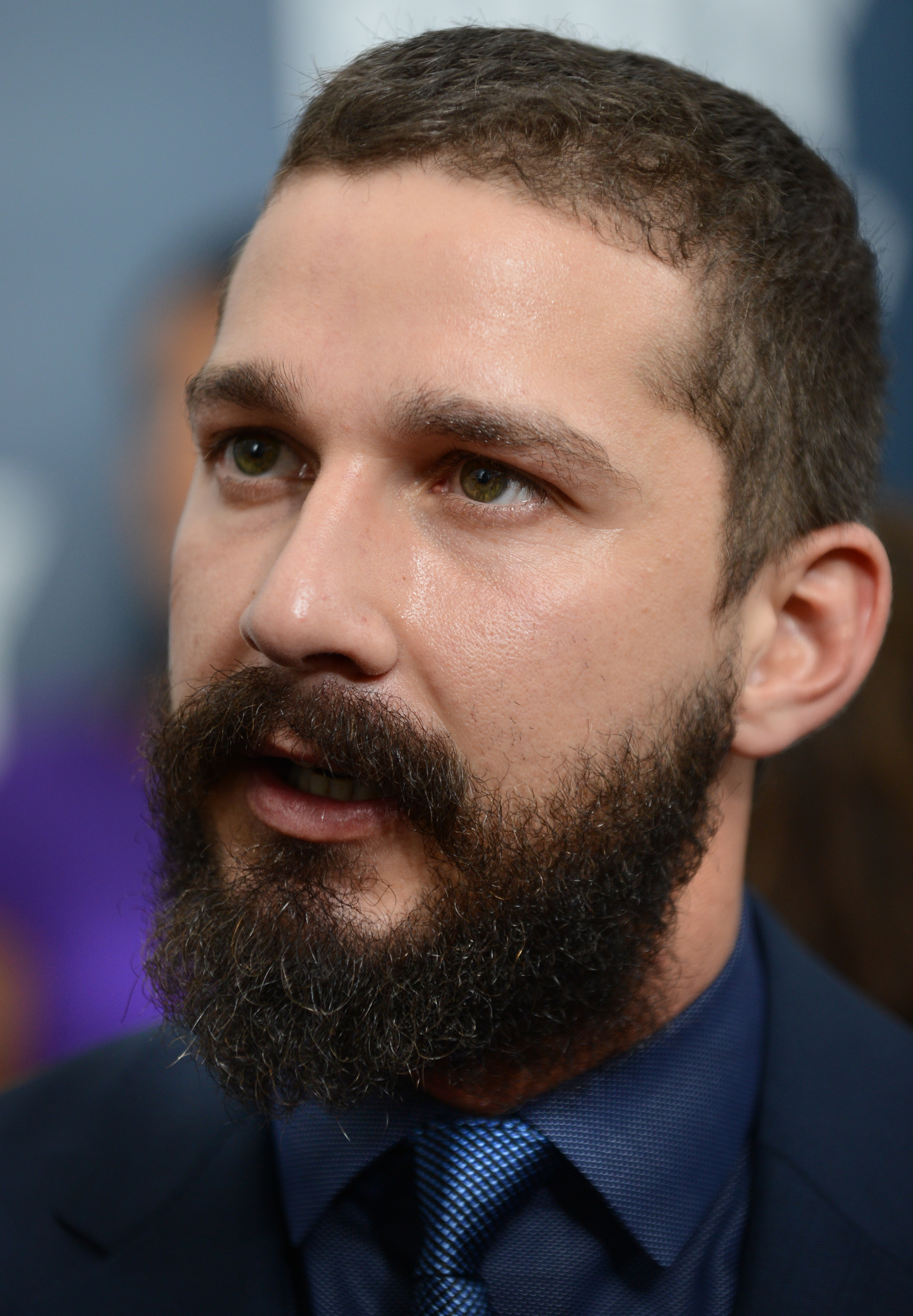
LaBeouf at the premiere of Fury in 2014

In February 2013, he pulled out of what would have been his Broadway debut, in Lyle Kessler's play Orphans, citing "creative differences" with co-star Alec Baldwin, although The New York Times and Baldwin himself maintain LaBeouf was fired. A month later, a film in which he starred alongside Robert Redford titled The Company You Keep was released. He next portrayed Jerôme Morris in the Lars von Trier-directed erotic art film Nymphomaniac, which premiered in December 2013. Meanwhile, at the film's screening at the Berlin Film Festival a tuxedoed LaBeouf walked the red carpet with a paper bag over his head with the words "I am not famous anymore" written upon it.

LaBeouf co-starred with Brad Pitt and Logan Lerman in David Ayer's World War II-set film, Fury, which was released in October 2014. Peter Travers of Rolling Stone called LaBeouf's performance "outstanding", whilst New York Daily News's Joe Neumaier commented that he "finally finds a role he can disappear into, without his image getting in the way." Calvin Wilson of St. Louis Post-Dispatch called LaBeouf's performance one of his best.

In 2015, LaBeouf starred in Sia's music video for "Elastic Heart" along with Maddie Ziegler. He also starred in the war-thriller film Man Down directed by Dito Montiel alongside Gary Oldman and Kate Mara. In 2016, LaBeouf starred in American Honey, directed by Andrea Arnold, playing the male lead role, Jake. In Variety, Guy Lodge wrote that "despite the apparent stunt casting of LaBeouf", he "easily delivers his best performance here, bleeding the eccentricities of his own celebrity persona into the character to fascinating, oddly moving effect". In 2017, he portrayed tennis player John McEnroe in the sports drama film Borg vs McEnroe.

In 2019, LaBeouf starred in the comedy-drama film The Peanut Butter Falcon, which premiered in March, and was released in August. In the same year, he portrayed a character based on his father in the film Honey Boy, which he also wrote. He penned the screenplay while in rehab and based it upon his life as an actor. Both The Peanut Butter Falcon and Honey Boy garnered acclaim from critics. The following year, LaBeouf starred in The Tax Collector, directed by David Ayer. In September 2020, he participated in a virtual reading of the comedy-drama film Fast Times at Ridgemont High. LaBeouf starred in the Netflix drama film Pieces of a Woman opposite Vanessa Kirby, directed by Kornél Mundruczó.

In 2023, LaBeouf made his stage debut in the premiere production of David Mamet's play Henry Johnson, playing the titular character's prison cellmate. In 2024, he played a lead role in Francis Ford Coppola's drama Megalopolis as Clodio Pulcher, the jealous cousin of the film's protagonist. He is set to star in the thriller Assassination, written by Mamet.

In 2025, LaBeouf appeared as himself in the feature documentary Slauson Rec, the debut film of director Leo Lewis O'Neil. Shot from 2018 to 2020, the film follows LaBeouf's free acting-lab in South-Central Los Angeles as it expands into an avant-garde theatre company and then collapses amid his increasingly volatile behaviour. Slauson Rec premiered at the 78th Cannes Film Festival in the Cannes Classics section on 18 May 2025, with LaBeouf in attendance. LaBeouf told reporters the film depicts "ugly and disgusting" aspects of his process but stating that he "fully support[s] the release of the film."

== Performance art ==
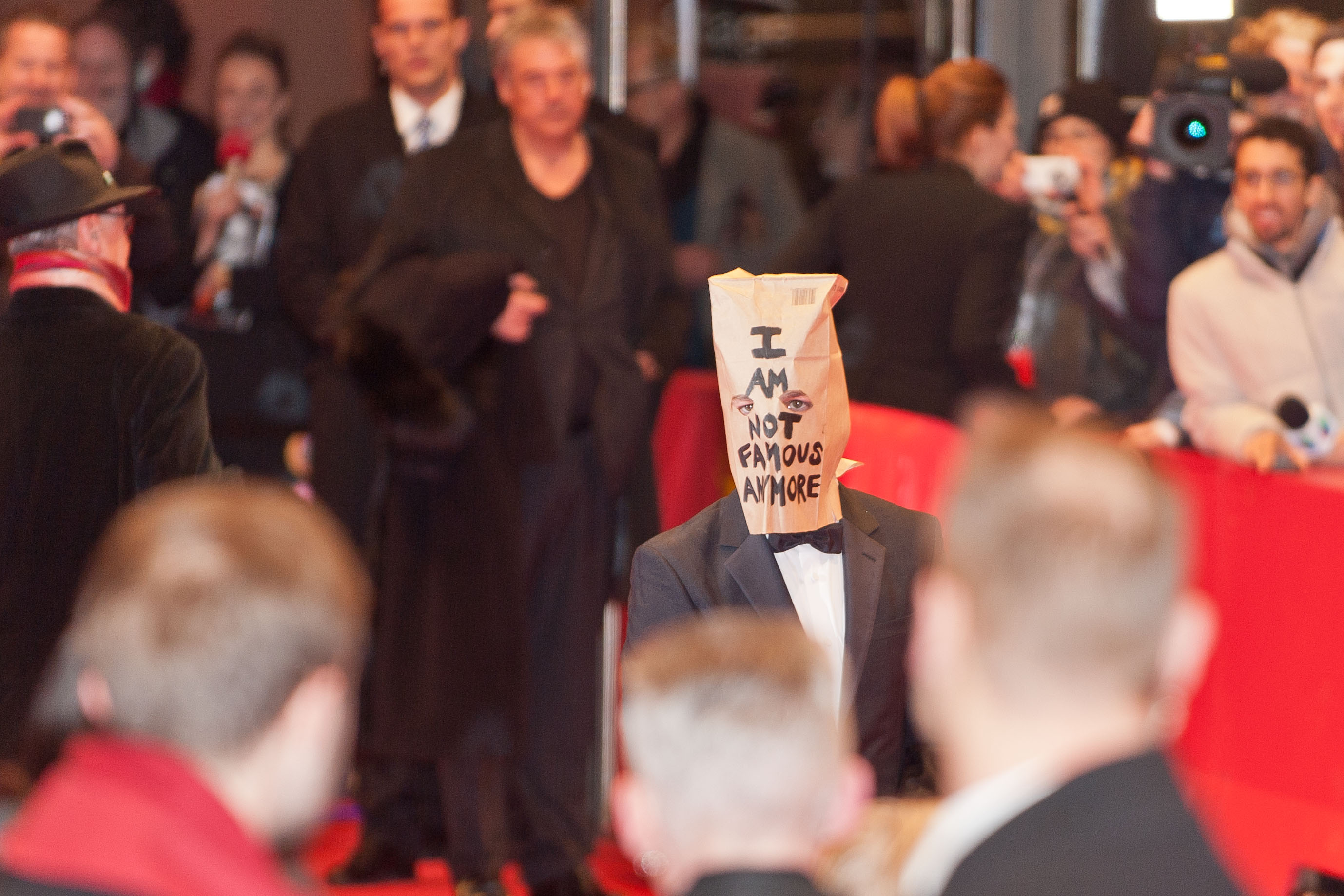
LaBeouf at the 2014 Berlin International Film Festival

In early 2014, LaBeouf began collaborating with British artist and author of The Metamodernist Manifesto, Luke Turner, and Finnish artist Nastja Säde Rönkkö, embarking on a series of actions described by Dazed as "a multi-platform meditation on celebrity and vulnerability". Since then, LaBeouf, Rönkkö & Turner have engaged in numerous high-profile performance art projects, including #IAMSORRY (2014), #Allmymovies (2015), #Touchmysoul (2015), #Takemeanywhere (2016), and Hewillnotdivide.us (2017–2021).

On February 9, 2014, the artists caused controversy at the Berlin Film Festival when LaBeouf arrived at the red carpet wearing a brown paper bag over his head with the words "I am not famous anymore" written on it. In a conversation conducted as part of the trio's #Interview piece in November 2014, LaBeouf said that he was "heartbroken" and "genuinely remorseful and full of shame and guilt" at the start of their subsequent #Iamsorry performance, in which he occupied a Los Angeles gallery for six days wearing the paper bag and silently crying in front of visitors, but that "in the end I felt cared for however it came—it was beautiful, it blew me away." He revealed that one woman had sexually assaulted him during the February performance, while Rönkkö and Turner later clarified that they had prevented the assault by intervening as soon as they were aware of the incident starting to occur.

In 2015, LaBeouf appeared in #Introductions, a half-hour video made by LaBeouf, Rönkkö & Turner in collaboration with Central Saint Martins Fine Art students, comprising a series of short monologues performed by LaBeouf in front of a green screen. One segment in the form of an exaggerated motivational speech, dubbed "Just Do It" after the Nike slogan, became an Internet meme after going viral within days of being released, spawning numerous remixes and parodies, and becoming the most searched for GIF of 2015 according to Google.

== Personal life ==
=== Relationships ===
LaBeouf met British actress Mia Goth while filming Nymphomaniac in 2012. On October 10, 2016, LaBeouf and Goth appeared to have married in a Las Vegas ceremony officiated by an Elvis impersonator. Two days later, a local official said the pair were not legally married and that a commitment ceremony had been performed. Later that month, LaBeouf confirmed during an appearance on The Ellen DeGeneres Show that they had married. In September 2018, the couple separated and filed for divorce.

LaBeouf dated British musician FKA Twigs from 2018 to 2019. He began dating American actress Margaret Qualley in 2020 after they co-starred in her sister Rainey Qualley's short film music video "Love Me Like You Hate Me". The relationship reportedly ended in January 2021. In September 2021, Margaret Qualley told Harper's Bazaar that she believed FKA Twigs's abuse allegations against LaBeouf.

In February 2022, it was reported that Goth and LaBeouf had reconciled and that she was pregnant with their child. Their daughter was born in March 2022. LaBeouf later credited Goth with saving his life at the time, stating, "She was present for me at a time when I didn't deserve to have nobody in my life, especially her... She gave me hope when I was really running on fumes." The pair broke up three years later in 2025.

=== Politics ===
In 2015, LaBeouf endorsed Jeremy Corbyn's campaign in the Labour Party leadership election in the United Kingdom. He told the Evening Standard: "I like Jeremy Corbyn. I like him in every way. British politics just got very exciting."

=== Religion ===
LaBeouf contributed an essay to the 2004 book I Am Jewish by Judea Pearl, in which he stated that he has a "personal relationship with God that happens to work within the confines of Judaism". LaBeouf had described himself as Jewish, but declared in 2007 that religion had "never made sense" to him. However, LaBeouf said in an interview in Interview magazine in October 2014 that "I found God doing [the film] Fury. I became a Christian man [...] Brad [Pitt] was really instrumental in guiding my head through this."

In an August 2022 interview with Bishop Robert Barron, LaBeouf said that he had fallen in love with the Catholic faith while studying for the titular role of the film Padre Pio and staying in a Capuchin monastery in the process. He stated that the Traditional Latin Mass played a key role in his conversion. In May 2023, LaBeouf confirmed that he was undergoing the Order of Christian Initiation of Adults. On December 31, 2023, LaBeouf was confirmed into the Catholic Church by Bishop Barron and it was said that he had expressed a wish to enter into the diaconate.

=== Controversies ===
==== Plagiarism accusations ====
On December 17, 2013, LaBeouf released his short film Howard Cantour.com to the Internet; shortly thereafter, several bloggers noted its close similarity to Justin M. Damiano, a 2007 comic by Ghost World creator Dan Clowes. Wired journalist Graeme McMillan noted at least three similarities in his article, one of which was that the opening monologue for the short and the comic were identical. LaBeouf would later remove the film and claim that he did not intend to copy Clowes but was instead "inspired" by him and "got lost in the creative process." He followed this up with several apologies via Twitter writing, "In my excitement and naiveté as an amateur filmmaker, I got lost in the creative process and neglected to follow proper accreditation", and "I deeply regret the manner in which these events have unfolded and want @danielclowes to know that I have a great respect for his work". Clowes responded by saying "The first I ever heard of the film was this morning when someone sent me a link. I've never spoken to or met Mr. LaBeouf ... I actually can't imagine what was going through his mind." LaBeouf was criticized over his apology, with some sites such as The A.V. Club noting that the apology itself appeared to have been lifted from a 2010 post on Yahoo! Answers.

Since the initial discovery of the plagiarism of Clowes' work, LaBeouf's other work has come under scrutiny. News outlets reported that LaBeouf's graphic novels, Let's Fucking Party and Stale N Mate, had been plagiarized from Benoît Duteurtre's The Little Girl and the Cigarette and Charles Bukowski's Assault.

In January 2014, LaBeouf spoke about the plagiarism accusations with Bleeding Cool writer Rich Johnston, stating that he saw copyright laws as too restrictive and that they did not allow for ideas to flow freely. LaBeouf later tweeted a description of his next project, Daniel Boring (a reference to David Boring, another comic created by Clowes). The description of the project was also taken word-for-word from a description by Clowes of his comic. Clowes' attorney, Michael Kump, sent a cease-and-desist letter to LaBeouf's attorney, which LaBeouf posted on Twitter.

==== Abuse allegations ====
In December 2020, LaBeouf was sued by his ex-girlfriend FKA Twigs for sexual battery, assault, and infliction of emotional distress. The lawsuit also detailed allegations that he abused another ex-girlfriend, stylist Karolyn Pho. LaBeouf stated in his response that he had been "abusive" to himself and those around him "for years" and that he was "ashamed" and "sorry to those [he] hurt"; he later denied the allegations. The lawsuit was scheduled to proceed to trial scheduled for April 17, 2023, November 6, 2023, October 14, 2024, and September 29, 2025 before being settled on undisclosed terms.

Following the lawsuit, Netflix removed him from its awards campaign for Pieces of a Woman. He subsequently took a hiatus from acting and began receiving treatment. During an interview with Jon Bernthal on his Real Ones podcast in August 2022, LaBeouf remarked that he had "hurt that woman", adding, "I was a pleasure-seeking, selfish, self-centered, dishonest, inconsiderate, fearful human being."

==== Casting dispute for Don't Worry Darling ====
In April 2020, LaBeouf was set to star in the psychological thriller film Don't Worry Darling, directed by Olivia Wilde. He was replaced by Harry Styles in September 2020 due to ostensible scheduling conflicts. Wilde later stated that she fired LaBeouf due to his "combative energy", clashing with cast and crew before filming started, including Florence Pugh who expressed being uncomfortable with LaBeouf's behavior.

LaBeouf denied he was fired and said that he "quit the film due to lack of rehearsal time" in August 2020. In August 2022, Variety published a story containing email forwards sent to Wilde disputing her firing claims along with photos of text messages and videos from Wilde in August 2020 asking LaBeouf to reconsider quitting the film. Representatives for Wilde and the studio declined to comment on LaBeouf's allegations, although Wilde later stated to Vanity Fair that "all I'll say is he was replaced". Vanity Fair reported that LaBeouf gave Wilde an ultimatum to choose between him and Pugh, with Wilde choosing Pugh.

== Legal issues ==
On June 26, 2014, LaBeouf was arrested at New York City's Studio 54 theater and subsequently charged with disorderly conduct, harassment, and criminal trespass. He was said to have been "acting disorderly, yelling and being loud". Following the incident, LaBeouf voluntarily sought outpatient treatment for alcoholism. He pleaded guilty to disorderly conduct, while the trespassing and harassment charges were dropped.

On July 8, 2017, LaBeouf was arrested in downtown Savannah, Georgia, at around 4 a.m. for public intoxication, disorderly conduct, and obstruction. Bodycam footage showed LaBeouf making "profanity-laced racial remarks" towards police officers during his arrest. He later attributed the incident to his alcohol addiction. After pleading no contest to the charge of disorderly conduct in October 2017, LaBeouf was found guilty of obstruction but was found not guilty of public intoxication. He was sentenced to probation for one year, including time served, and ordered to pay a $1,000 fine as well as seek therapy to manage his anger and substance use issues.

In September 2020, LaBeouf was criminally charged with misdemeanor battery and petty theft for his involvement in an altercation with a man in June of that year. He pleaded not guilty. A judge ordered LaBeouf into a diversion program in May 2021, which he completed, resulting in the charges being dropped.

In February 2026, LaBeouf was arrested for two charges of simple battery during the Mardi Gras celebration in New Orleans. A judge ordered him to undergo substance-abuse treatment, submit to weekly drug screening, and post $100,000 bond. Explaining the situation, LaBeouf said: "It was on me. It's not on them. It's on me. I messed up ... I think it's something that has to do with anger and ego more so than my drinking. That's where I'm at now on my journey, and I'm trying to navigate it." Discussing what led to the incident, LaBeouf claimed to be homophobic, explaining that "big gay people are scary to me. I'm standing by myself, and three gay dudes are next to me, touching my leg, I get scared. I'm sorry. If that's homophobic, then I'm that." Police would confirm that LaBeouf had used homophobic slurs during the incident; in the same interview, LaBeouf stated his awareness that the charge could be upgraded to a hate crime. In May 2026, LaBeouf was formally charged for his alleged Mardi Gras altercation. He received three counts of battery in New Orleans court. On June 3, 2026, LaBeouf was found guilty for his role in the Mardi Gras brawl. He received two years of probation and a six-month suspended prison sentence. He was also ordered to undergo anger management counseling, alcohol abuse rehabilitation, and sensitivity training.

== Filmography ==
=== Film ===
Year	Title	Role	Notes
1998	The Christmas Path	Cal	
1998	Monkey Business	Wyatt	
2003	Holes	Stanley "Caveman" Yelnats IV	
2003	Dumb and Dumberer: When Harry Met Lloyd	Lewis	
2003	Charlie's Angels: Full Throttle	Max Petroni	
2003	The Battle of Shaker Heights	Kelly Ernswiler	
2004	I, Robot	Farber	
2004	Let's Love Hate	—N/a	Director and writer only; short film
2005	Constantine	Chas Kramer	
2005	Nausicaä of the Valley of the Wind	Asbel	Voice role; English dub
2005	The Greatest Game Ever Played	Francis Ouimet	
2006	A Guide to Recognizing Your Saints	Young Dito	
2006	Bobby	Cooper	
2007	Disturbia	Kale Brecht	
2007	Surf's Up	Cody Maverick	Voice role
2007	Transformers	Sam Witwicky	
2008	The Smallest River in Almirante	—N/a	Executive producer only; short film
2008	Indiana Jones and the Kingdom of the Crystal Skull	Henry "Mutt Williams" Jones III	
2008	Eagle Eye	Jerry Shaw / Ethan Shaw	
2009	Transformers: Revenge of the Fallen	Sam Witwicky	
2009	New York, I Love You	Jacob	
2010	Wall Street: Money Never Sleeps	Jake Moore	
2011	Transformers: Dark of the Moon	Sam Witwicky	
2011	Born Villain	—N/a	Director and co-writer only; short film
2011	Maniac	The Director	Also director; short film
2012	Radioman	Himself	Documentary
2012	Howard Cantour.com	—N/a	Director only; short film
2012	Lawless	Jack Bondurant	
2012	The Company You Keep	Ben Shepard	
2013	Charlie Countryman	Charlie Countryman	
2013	Nymphomaniac	Jerôme Morris	
2014	Fury	Boyd Swan	
2015	Man Down	Gabriel Drummer	
2016	LoveTrue	—N/a	Executive producer only; documentary
2016	American Honey	Jake	
2016	Everyday Performance Artists	Narrator	Voice role; short film
2017	Borg vs McEnroe	John McEnroe	
2018	#TAKEMEANYWHERE	Himself	Also director and producer; documentary
2019	Honey Boy	James Lort	Also writer
2019	The Peanut Butter Falcon	Tyler	
2020	The Tax Collector	Creeper	
2020	Pieces of a Woman	Sean Carson	
2021	A Man Named Scott	Himself	Documentary
2022	Padre Pio	Padre Pio	
2024	Megalopolis	Clodio Pulcher	
2025	Henry Johnson	Gene	
2025	Salvable	Vince	
2025	Slauson Rec	Himself	Documentary

=== Television ===
Year	Title	Role	Notes
1998	Caroline in the City	Ethan	Episode: "Caroline and the Bar Mitzvah"
1998	Breakfast with Einstein	Joey	Television film
1999	Jesse	Moe	Episode: "Momma Was a Rollin' Stone"
1999	Everything's Relative	Young Marty	Episode: "Prisoner of Love"
1999	Suddenly Susan	Ritchie	Episode: "A Day in the Life"
1999	Touched by an Angel	Johnny	Episode: "The Occupant"
1999	The X-Files	Richie Lupone	Episode: "The Goldberg Variation"
2000	ER	Darnel Smith	Episode: "Abby Road"
2000	Freaks and Geeks	Herbert the Mascot	Episode: "We've Got Spirit"
2000–2003	Even Stevens	Louis Anthony Stevens	65 episodes
2001	Hounded	Ronny van Dussel	Television film
2001	The Nightmare Room	Dylan Pierce	Episode: "Scareful What You Wish For"
2002	The Proud Family	Johnny McBride	Episode: "I Love You Penny Proud"; voice role
2002	Tru Confessions	Eddie Walker	Television film
2003	The Even Stevens Movie	Louis Anthony Stevens	Television film
2003	Project Greenlight	Himself / Kelly Ernswiler	Season 2
2003	Say What? Karaoke	Guest judge	3 episodes
2005	Total Request Live	Himself (co-host)	1 episode
2007	Saturday Night Live	Himself (host)	Episode: "Shia LaBeouf/Avril Lavigne"
2008	Saturday Night Live	Himself (host)	Episode: "Shia LaBeouf/My Morning Jacket"

=== Theatre ===
Year	Title	Role	Playwright	Venue
2023	Henry Johnson	Gene	David Mamet	The Electric Lodge

=== Music video ===
Year	Title	Role	Notes
2003	D-Tent Boys – "Dig It"	Stanley "Caveman" Yelnats IV	Also performer and songwriter
2009	Rumspringa – "Minds Awake"	—N/a	Director only
2009	Cage – "I Never Knew You"	Cage's friend	Also director
2011	Kid Cudi – "Marijuana"	Himself	Also director and editor
2012	Sigur Rós – "Fjögur píanó"	Man	
2013	Future Unlimited – "Haunted Love"	—N/a	Director only
2014	Rob Cantor – "Shia LaBeouf"	Himself	
2015	Sia – "Elastic Heart"	Sia	
2019	Baby Keem – "Gang Activities"	—N/a	Director and editor only
2020	Rainsford – "Love Me Like You Hate Me"	Boyfriend	Danced with Margaret Qualley

=== Video game ===
Year	Title	Role	Notes
2007	Surf's Up	Cody Maverick	Voice role
2007	Transformers: The Game	Sam Witwicky	Voice role
2009	Transformers: Revenge of the Fallen	Sam Witwicky	Voice role

=== Web ===
Year	Title	Role	Notes
2008	5 More Friends	Himself	Public service announcement
2014	Be The Ball	Himself	Teaser
2015	#INTRODUCTIONS	Various	Short film
2019	Nightmare Before X-mas	Himself	Documentary
