= Dito Montiel =

American author, filmmaker, musician

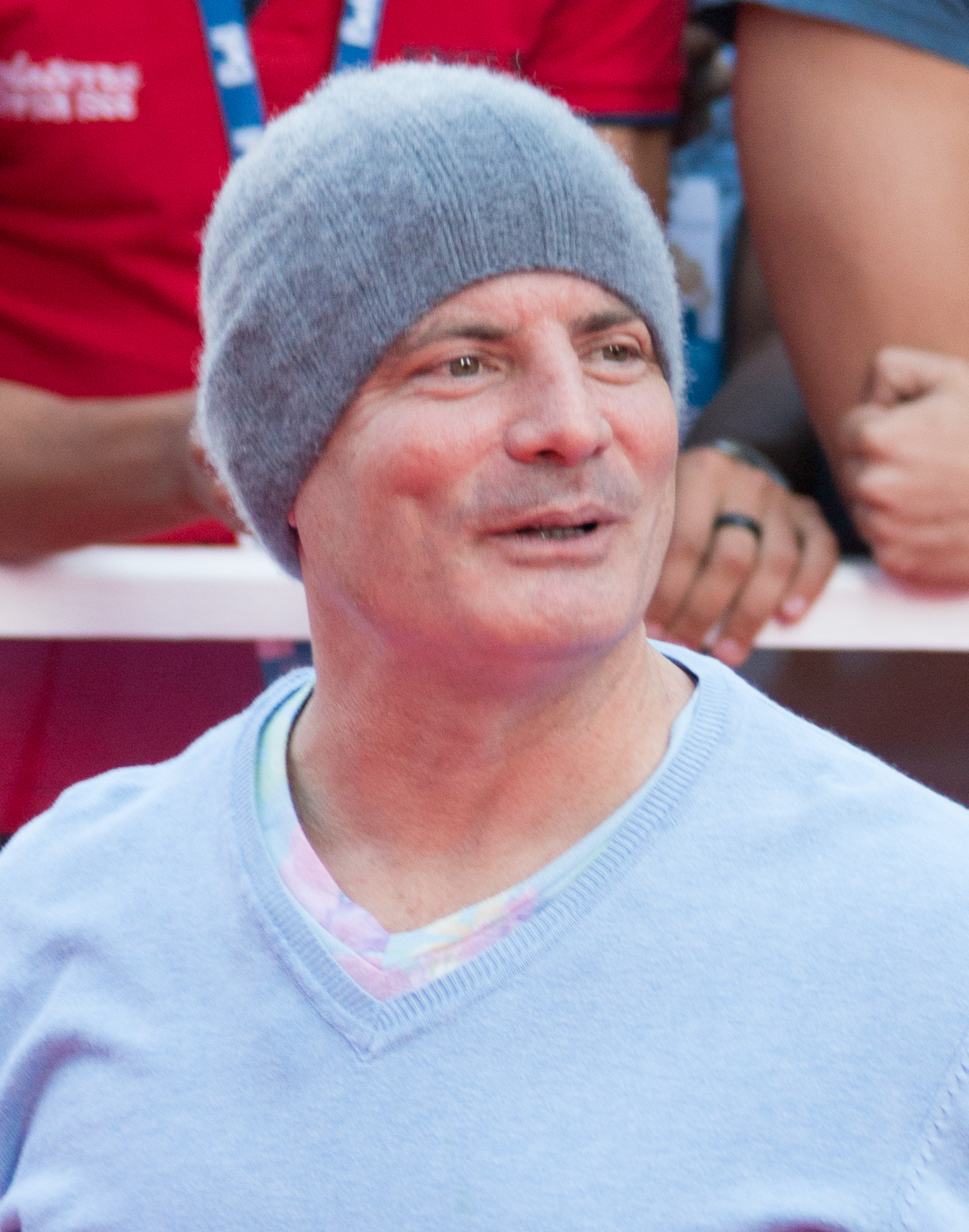
- Montiel at the 2015 Toronto International Film Festival
- Born: Orlandito Montiel; New York City, U.S. Queens
- Occupations: Filmmaker, author, musician
- Years active: 1989–present

Orlandito Montiel is an American author, filmmaker, and musician.

== Early Career & Music ==
Born in New York City to a father from Nicaragua and an American mother of Irish descent, Montiel was active in the early '80s New York hardcore punk scene when he was vocalist for Queens-based Major Conflict. Later, he would gain notoriety in 1989 when Geffen Records signed his newly formed outfit Gutterboy to a $1 million record deal, an unheard-of sum for a new band at the time. The band was dropped after its debut and was dubbed one of the most "successful" unsuccessful bands in rock history.

In 2003, Montiel published A Guide to Recognizing Your Saints, a memoir detailing his life growing up in Astoria, Queens in the early 1980s during the rise of the hardcore punk scene. The book describes his time spent touring with his band Gutterboy and his brief modeling career with Versace along with other personal anecdotes.

== Filmmaking ==
After adapting his best-selling book into a screenplay, Montiel made his directorial debut with the film version of A Guide to Recognizing Your Saints, with Robert Downey Jr. (as the older Montiel), Dianne Wiest, Channing Tatum and Shia LaBeouf (as the young Montiel). The film was executive produced by Trudie Styler.

Montiel released the self-titled album Dito Montiel in 2006 through Rhino Records. His second novel, Eddie Krumble Is the Clapper, was published in April 2007.

Montiel also directed a film, Fighting, about a young street hawker in New York City who is introduced to the world of underground street fighting. The film is his second collaboration with Tatum and also stars Terrence Howard and Luis Guzmán.

In 2011, Montiel's police drama The Son of No One, again starring Tatum, as well as Ray Liotta, Al Pacino, Tracy Morgan and Katie Holmes, played at the Sundance Film Festival. The film was picked up for distribution by Anchor Bay Entertainment.

In 2013, Montiel directed the crime-drama film Empire State, starring Liam Hemsworth, Emma Roberts and Dwayne Johnson. This was followed by the drama film Boulevard, starring Robin Williams and Kathy Baker. It was Robin Williams' last movie.

== Teaching ==
Montiel serves as an instructor on Screenwriting for the UCLA Extension program.

== Filmography ==
- A Guide to Recognizing Your Saints (2006)
- Fighting (2009)
- The Son of No One (2011)
- Empire State (2013)
- Boulevard (2014)
- Man Down (2015)
- The Clapper (2017)
- Critical Thinking (2020)
- Riff Raff (2024)

== Bibliography ==
- A Guide to Recognizing Your Saints (2003)
- Eddie Krumble Is the Clapper (2007)
- Story of Milk (2012)

== Discography ==
- Dito Montiel (2006)
