= A Guide to Recognizing Your Saints =

2006 film by Dito Montiel

- Promotional poster
- Directed by: Dito Montiel
- Screenplay by: Dito Montiel
- Based on: A Guide to Recognizing Your Saints by Dito Montiel
- Produced by: Clara Markowicz; Charlie Corwin; Trudie Styler; Travis Swords
- Starring: Robert Downey Jr. Shia LaBeouf; Rosario Dawson; Melonie Diaz; Eric Roberts; Channing Tatum; Chazz Palminteri; Dianne Wiest
- Cinematography: Éric Gautier
- Edited by: Jake Pushinsky; Christopher Tellefsen
- Music by: Jonathan Elias
- Production companies: Belladonna Productions; Original Media; Xingu Films
- Distributed by: First Look International
- Release dates: January 20, 2006 (Sundance); September 29, 2006 (United States)
- Running time: 98 minutes
- Country: United States
- Languages: English; Spanish
- Box office: $2 million

A Guide to Recognizing Your Saints is a 2006 American drama film based on a 2001 memoir of the same name by author, director, and musician Dito Montiel, which describes his youth in Astoria, Queens, New York, during the 1980s. Montiel wrote and directed the film adaptation, which was released in the United States in September 2006 and in Europe in March 2007. The film stars Robert Downey Jr. as Montiel with Shia LaBeouf as a younger Montiel.

The film's narrative jumps frequently between 2005 and flashbacks from 1986 (filmed largely with shaky camera with short shots) with characters occasionally "breaking the fourth wall," i.e., addressing the viewer.

== Plot ==
The film switches back and forth between the present and flashbacks of Dito's memories in the summer of 1986.

Present Day (2005):
Dito is a successful writer in Los Angeles. One day, after being urged by his mother Flori and his friend Nerf, Dito visits his childhood home in Astoria, New York because his father has suddenly become very ill. Dito meets Nerf and talks with him in a parked car where they can converse undisturbed, which would not have been possible at Nerf's house. Dito then visits his childhood sweetheart Laurie, who is now a mother. They only talk through an open window; she does not let him in.

Dito finally visits his overprotective father, Monty. Monty used to ignore Dito's feelings, and didn't want Dito to travel. He is angry at his son for leaving and for not coming to visit sooner; he then sends Dito away. Laurie urges Dito to be a man and come to terms with his father, who was heartbroken when his son left. Dito does leave, but returns later to insist that he take his father to the hospital.

1986:
Antonio, an overconfident, volatile boy with an abusive father, kills Puerto Rican gang member Reaper as payback for an attack on young Dito. Viewers are then introduced to Antonio's younger brother, Giuseppe - reckless, destructive, and possibly with an undiagnosed mental illness or cognitive impairment. Giuseppe lies on a subway track; in spite of urgent warnings from Antonio and Nerf that a train was coming, Giuseppe fails to get back on the platform and is killed.

Mike O'Shea, another friend of Dito's, is a Scottish boy who dreamt of becoming a musician. Mike and Dito had planned to take a bus to California. They worked for Frank, a gay drug addict with a dog-walking business. They went to his house to collect wages he was slow in paying. At first, Frank did not listen to them, but then gave them all the money he kept in his refrigerator--more than he owed them--and told them to leave town. Shortly thereafter, Mike is murdered by a Puerto Rican gang member in retaliation for Reaper's murder, after which Dito travels to California alone.

Present Day:
Dito visits the adult Antonio in prison and sees him as a changed man of wisdom. The film concludes with the two of them sitting down in conversation.

== Cast ==
- Robert Downey Jr. as Dito Montiel
  - Shia LaBeouf as Young Dito Montiel
- Rosario Dawson as Laurie
  - Melonie Diaz as Young Laurie
- Eric Roberts as Antonio
  - Channing Tatum as Young Antonio
- Chazz Palminteri as Monty Montiel
- Dianne Wiest as Flori Montiel
- Scott Michael Campbell as Nerf
  - Peter Tambakis as Young Nerf
- Federico Castelluccio as Antonio & Giuseppe's Father
- Adam Scarimbolo as Giuseppe
- Martin Compston as Mike O'Shea
- Anthony DeSando as Frank, The Dog Walker
- Eleonore Hendricks as Jenny
- Michael Rivera as "Reaper"

== Production ==
This film was Montiel's directorial debut.

Initially, Montiel refused to see LaBeouf for the part, having only seen him as the "Disney guy." Once he got to audition for the role, he "fucked his office up," putting a "hole through the wall" and went as "crazy" as he could in order to change the image Montiel had of him to land the part.

== Characters ==
Montiel states that all the characters in the film are a combination of at least three people and sometimes six or seven, although some characters are given the names of people from real life. Listed below are some of the main differences between four characters and their real-life counterparts.

=== Laurie ===
Montiel said that he made the film because “I wanted to walk down those streets again and fall in love with Laurie again, it would have been nice to have had that moment at the end of the film where Dito met Laurie, reconnecting as adults." The real-life Laurie was white instead of Hispanic and died two years earlier from AIDS.

=== Antonio ===
Montiel states that Antonio is a composite of three people. The book mentions a kid named Antonio Ruggeria who was sent to prison for manslaughter, escaped, and was later sent to prison again for things "that are even beyond putting in a movie that people might find redeemable." In the book, a copy of a newspaper article describing Antonio's escape from Rikers Island has the crime he committed blanked out.

=== Giuseppe ===
The film shows Giuseppe getting killed on a subway track. The inspiration for the scene was a kid named Billy who was "riding" trains when he was killed. The real Giuseppe Ruggeria is a career criminal who was deported to Milan. Montiel describes the real Giuseppe as being like a cat. "The train would come and two seconds later he would pop up."

=== Mike ===
The Scottish character Mike is a composite of a man named Mike O'Shea; a kid named Ray, who used to go to the city with Dito, sniff amyl nitrite and smoke hashish; and Angelo Ruggeria (a younger brother of Antonio) who was later murdered. The real Mike O'Shea is Irish, alive, married, and living in Essex, England.

== Reception ==
The film holds a 76% rating on Rotten Tomatoes based on 94 reviews, with an average rating of 6.6/10. The site’s critics consensus reads, "A Guide to Recognizing Your Saints is a lively, powerful coming-of-age tale with winning performances and sharp direction from first-timer Dito Montiel." Metacritic, which uses a weighted average, assigned the film a score of 67 out of 100, based on 25 reviews.

== Awards and nominations ==
Sundance Film Festival

Year	Group	Award	Won?	Notes
2006	Director's Award	Dramatic, for Dito Montiel	Yes	
2006	Special Jury Prize	Dramatic, for the ensemble cast	Yes	Shared between Robert Downey Jr., Shia LaBeouf, Rosario Dawson, Chazz Palminteri, Dianne Wiest, and Channing Tatum
2006	Grand Jury Prize	Dramatic, for Dito Montiel	No	

Gijón International Film Festival

Year	Group	Award	Won?	Notes
2006	Best Actor	Dramatic, for Adam Scarimbolo	Yes	

Independent Spirit Awards

Year	Group	Award	Won?	Notes
2006	Best First Screenplay	for Dito Montiel	No	Lost to Little Miss Sunshine
2006	Best Supporting Male	for Channing Tatum	No	Lost to Alan Arkin for Little Miss Sunshine
2006	Best Supporting Female	for Melonie Diaz	No	Lost to Frances McDormand for Friends with Money

== Home media ==
The DVD of the film was released on February 20, 2007 in the United States.
