= Primetime Emmy Award for Outstanding Art Direction for a Single-Camera Series =

Television award category

The Primetime Emmy Award for Outstanding Art Direction for a Single-Camera Series is a retired award that was handed out annually at the Creative Arts Emmy Awards. In 2014, the category was restructured into Outstanding Production Design for a Narrative Contemporary or Fantasy Program (One Hour or More), Outstanding Production Design for a Narrative Program (Half-Hour or Less) and Outstanding Production Design for a Narrative Period Program (One Hour or More).

== Winners and nominations ==
=== 1950s ===
Year	Program	Episode(s)	Nominees	Network
1956
1956	Outstanding Art Direction for a Film Series			
1956	You Are There		William Ferrari	CBS
1956	Four Star Playhouse		Duncan Cramer	CBS
1956	Medic		Ernst Fegté	NBC
1956	Robin Hood		Peter Proud	CBS
1956	Schlitz Playhouse		Serge Krizman	CBS
1956	Outstanding Art Direction for a Live Series			
1956	Playwrights '56 and Producers' Showcase		Otis Riggs	NBC
1956	Alice in Wonderland and The Good Fairy (Hallmark Hall of Fame)		Jan Scott	NBC
1956	Climax!		James Dowell Vance	CBS
1956	Lux Video Theatre		William Craig Smith	NBC
1956	The Perry Como Show		Don Shirley	NBC
1956	The United States Steel Hour		Carl Kent	CBS
1957
1957	Outstanding Art Direction (Half Hour or Less)			
1957	Your Hit Parade		Paul Barnes	NBC
1957	Adventure		Grover Cole	CBS
1957	The Dinah Shore Show		Franklin Swig	NBC
1957	Frontiers of Faith		Warren Clymer	NBC
1957	G.E. Theatre		John J. Lloyd, John Robert Lloyd, John Meehan, Martin Obzina, George Patrick	CBS
1957	Outstanding Art Direction (One Hour or More)			
1957	Requiem for a Heavyweight (Playhouse 90)		Albert Heschong	CBS
1957	The Kaiser Aluminum Hour		Jan Scott	NBC
1957	Kraft Television Theatre		Duane McKinney	NBC
1957	Omnibus		Henry May	CBS
1957	The Perry Como Show		Don Shirley	NBC
1958
1958	Twelfth Night (Hallmark Hall of Fame)		Rouben Ter-Arutunian	NBC
1958	Climax!		Beulah Frankel	CBS
1958	The George Gobel Show		Robert Kelly	NBC
1958	The Perry Como Show		Don Shirley	NBC
1958	Wagon Train		Howard E. Johnson	NBC
1959
1959	Outstanding Art Direction for a Live Television Program			
1959	An Evening with Fred Astaire		Edward Stephenson	NBC
1959	The Count of Monte Cristo (DuPont Show of the Month)		Bob Wade	CBS
1959	Hamlet (DuPont Show of the Month)		Bob Markell	CBS
1959	Hans Brinker and the Silver Skates (Hallmark Hall of Fame)		Jan Scott	NBC
1959	Little Moon of Alban (Hallmark Hall of Fame)		Warren Clymer	NBC
1959	Old Man (Playhouse 90)		Walter Scott Herndon	CBS
1959	Outstanding Art Direction for a Television Film			
1959	Bernadette (Westinghouse Desilu Playhouse)		Claudio Guzmán	CBS
1959	The Californians	"The Man from Paris"	Albert M. Pyke	NBC
1959	Corporal Hardy (Alcoa-Goodyear Theatre)		John T. McCormack	CBS
1959	Most Honorable Day (The Loretta Young Show)		Frank Sylos	NBC
1959	The Texan	"The Dutches of Denver"	Ralph Berger, Charles F. Pyke	CBS

=== 1960s ===
Outstanding Achievement in Art Direction and Scenic Design

Year	Program	Episode(s)	Nominees	Network
1960
1960	Westinghouse Desilu Playhouse		Ralph Berger, Frank Smith	CBS
1960	Alfred Hitchcock Presents		John J. Lloyd	CBS
1960	The Garry Moore Show		Charles Lisanby	CBS
1961
1961	Checkmate		John J. Lloyd	CBS
1961	Perry Como's Kraft Music Hall		Gary Smith	NBC
1961	24 Hours in a Woman's Life		Jac Venza	CBS
1962
1962	Perry Como's Kraft Music Hall		Gary Smith	NBC
1962	The Garry Moore Show		Charles Lisanby	CBS
1962	The Power and the Glory		Burr Smidt	CBS
1962	The Twilight Zone		Philip Barber	CBS
1962	Theatre '62		Jan Scott	NBC
1963
1963	Walt Disney's Wonderful World of Color		Carroll Clark, Marvin Aubrey Davis	NBC
1963	Bonanza		A. Earl Hedrick, Hal Pereira	NBC
1963	The Defenders		Willard Levitas	CBS
1963	The DuPont Show of the Week		Jan Scott	NBC
1963	The Eleventh Hour		George Davis, Merrill Pye	NBC
1963	Pygmalion (Hallmark Hall of Fame)		Warren Clymer	NBC
1964
1964	The Fantasticks (Hallmark Hall of Fame)		Warren Clymer	NBC
1964	The Danny Kaye Show		Edward Stephenson	CBS
1964	The Judy Garland Show		Robert Kelly, Gary Smith	CBS
1964	The Outer Limits		Jack Poplin	ABC
1965
1965	The Holy Terror (Hallmark Hall of Fame)		Warren Clymer	NBC
1965	My Name Is Barbra		Bill Harp, Tom H. John	CBS
1965	A Carol for Another Christmas (Xerox Specials)		Gene Callahan, Jack Wright	NBC
1965	The Magnificent Yankee (Hallmark Hall of Fame)		Warren Clymer	NBC
1966
1966	The Hollywood Palace		James Trittipo	ABC
1966	The Andy Williams Show		Edward Stephenson	NBC
1966	Color Me Barbra		Tom H. John	CBS
1966	The Man from U.N.C.L.E.		George Davis, Merrill Pye, James W. Sullivan	NBC
1966	Voyage to the Bottom of the Sea		William J. Creber	ABC
1966	Walt Disney's Wonderful World of Color	"Further Adventures of Gallegher"	Carroll Clark, William H. Tuntke	NBC
1967
1967	Death of a Salesman		Earl Carlson, Tom H. John	CBS
1968
1968	The Fred Astaire Show		James Trittipo	CBS
1968	Kismet (Armstrong Center Theater)		George Gaines, Jan Scott	ABC
1968	Elizabeth the Queen (Hallmark Hall of Fame)		Warren Clymer	NBC
1968	Mission: Impossible	"Echo of Yesterday"	Bill Ross	CBS
1968	The Smothers Brothers Comedy Hour	"Episode 210"	Lucien Hafley, Bill Ross	CBS
1969
1969	Mission: Impossible	"The Bunker"	Lucien Hafley, Bill Ross	CBS
1969	Rowan & Martin's Laugh-In		Ken Johnson	NBC
1969	Star Trek	"All Our Yesterdays"	John M. Dwyer, Matt Jefferies	NBC

=== 1970s ===
Outstanding Art Direction for a Dramatic Program or Series

Year	Program	Episode(s)	Nominees	Network
1970
1970	Shadow Game (CBS Playhouse)		Earl Carlson, Jan Scott	CBS
1970	The File on Devlin (Hallmark Hall of Fame)		James Trittipo	NBC
1970	Man on the Moon: The Epic Journey of Apollo XI		Wesley Laws, Hugh Gray Raisky	CBS
1970	Mission: Impossible		Lucien M. Hafley, Gibson Holley	CBS
1971
1971	Hamlet (Hallmark Hall of Fame)		Peter Roden	NBC
1971	Mannix	"The Mouse That Died"	Fred R. Price, Jan M. Van Tamelen	CBS
1971	Montserrat		Jan Scott	PBS
1971	The Price (Hallmark Hall of Fame)		John Clements	NBC
1971	Vanished		John J. Lloyd, Ruby R. Levitt	NBC
1972
1972	The Scarecrow		Jan Scott	PBS
1972	Look Homeward, Angel (CBS Playhouse)		Ben Edwards	CBS
1972	Mission: Impossible		Lucien M. Hafley, Gibson Holley	CBS
1972	The Snow Goose (Hallmark Hall of Fame)		Stanley Morris	NBC
1973
1973	Much Ado About Nothing		Tom H. John	CBS
1973	Another Part of the Forest		Jan Scott	CBS
1973	Mannix		Fred R. Price, Jan M. Van Tamelen	CBS
1973	Mission: Impossible		Lucien M. Hafley, Gibson Holley	CBS
1973	Night of Terror		William Campbell	ABC
1973	The Red Pony		Robert F. Boyle, James Hulsey, John Kurl	NBC
1974
1974	The Lie		Jan Scott, Charles Kreiner	CBS
1974	The Autobiography of Miss Jane Pittman		Michael D. Haller	ABC
1974	The Execution of Private Slovik		Walter H. Tyler, Richard Friedman	NBC

Outstanding Art Direction for a Series

Year	Program	Episode(s)	Nominees	Network
1975
1975	Benjamin Franklin	"The Ambassador"	Charles Lisanby, Robert Checchi	CBS
1975	Columbo	"Playback"	Michael Baugh, Jerry Adams	NBC
1975	QB VII	"Parts 1 & 2"	Ross Bellah, Maurice Fowler, Audrey A. Blasdel, Terry Parr	ABC
1976
1976	Beacon Hill	"Pilot"	Tom H. John, John A. Wendell, Wesley Laws	CBS
1976	The Adams Chronicles	"John Adams, Minister to Great Britain"	Ed Wittstein	PBS
1976	Jennie: Lady Randolph Churchill	"Recovery"	Mike Hall, Frederick Pusey	PBS
1976	Rich Man, Poor Man	"Part 7"	Ed Wittstein	ABC
1977
1977	Outstanding Art Direction for a Comedy Series			
1977	Fish	"The Really Longest Day"	Thomas Azzari	ABC
1977	All in the Family	"The Unemployment Story, Part 2"	Don Roberts	CBS
1977	Maude	"Walter's Crisis"	Chuck Murawski	CBS
1977	Mr. T and Tina	"The Americanization of Michi"	Roy Christopher, Mary Ann Biddle	ABC
1977	Sirota's Court	"The Happy Hooker"	Seymour Klate, Mary Ann Biddle	NBC
1977	Outstanding Art Direction for a Drama Series			
1977	The Pallisers	"Pilot"	Tim Harvey	PBS
1977	The Adams Chronicles	"John Quincy Adams, Congressman"	Ed Wittstein	PBS
1977	Captains and the Kings	"Chapter 2"	John W. Corso, Jerry Adams	NBC
1977	Roots	"Part 2"	Jan Scott, Charles C. Bennett	ABC
1977	Roots	"Part 6"	Joseph R. Jennings, Solomon Brewer	ABC
1978
1978	Outstanding Art Direction for a Comedy Series			
1978	Soap	"Pilot"	Edward Stephenson, Robert Checchi	ABC
1978	A.E.S. Hudson Street	"In the Black"	Thomas Azzari	ABC
1978	The Love Boat	—	Paul Sylos, Eugene Harris, Bob Signorelli, John McCarthy Jr.	ABC
1978	Maude	"The Wake"	Chuck Murawski	CBS
1978	Welcome Back, Kotter	"Barbarino in Love, Part 1"	Roy Christopher, James Shanahan	ABC
1978	Outstanding Art Direction for a Drama Series			
1978	I, Claudius	"Part 1"	Tim Harvey	PBS
1978	Anna Karenina	"Part 1"	Derek Dodd	PBS
1978	Holocaust		Wilfred Shingleton, Theodor Harisch, Hans Jürgen Kiebach, Maxi Hareiter	NBC
1978	Washington: Behind Closed Doors	"Part 3"	Jack De Shields, James F. Claytor Sr., Barbara Krieger	ABC
1979
1979	Little Women	"Part 1"	Howard E. Johnson, Richard C. Goddard	NBC
1979	Battlestar Galactica	"Saga of a Star World"	John E. Chilberg II, Mickey S. Michaels, Lowell Chambers	ABC
1979	The Mary Tyler Moore Hour	"Gene Kelly"	René Lagler, Carl Carlson	CBS

=== 1980s ===
Year	Program	Episode(s)	Nominees	Network
1980
1980	Palmerstown, U.S.A.	"The Old Sister"	James D. Bissell, Bill Webb	CBS
1980	Beyond Westworld	"Pilot"	Michael Baugh, Edward J. McDonald	CBS
1980	Buck Rogers in the 25th Century	"Ardala Returns"	Hub Braden, Fred Luff III, Frank Lombardo	NBC
1980	Hart to Hart	"Man with Jade Eyes"	James J. Agazzi, Paul Sylos, Bob Signorelli	ABC
1980	Skag	"Pilot"	David Marshall, William Craig Smith, Leonard A. Mazzola	NBC
1981
1981	The Gangster Chronicles	"Chapter 11"	Howard E. Johnson, John M. Dwyer, Robert George Freer	NBC
1981	Dynasty	"Oil"	John E. Chilberg II, Paul Sylos, Franklin Swig, Brock Broughton	ABC
1981	Good Time Harry	"Wally Smith"	Thomas Azzari, James Ira Colburn	NBC
1981	Hart to Hart	"Blue Chip Murders"	James J. Agazzi, Paul Sylos, Bob Signorelli	ABC
1981	Hill Street Blues	"Hill Street Station"	Jeffrey L. Goldstein, Joseph A. Armetta	NBC
1982
1982	Fame	"Tomorrow's Farewell"	Ira Diamond, Joseph Stone	NBC
1982	Bret Maverick	"The Yellow Rose"	Scott Ritenour, Robert L. Zilliox	NBC
1982	Hart to Hart	"The Hart of the Matter"	James J. Agazzi, Paul Sylos, Bob Signorelli	ABC
1982	Hill Street Blues	"Personal Foul"	Jeffrey L. Goldstein, James Cane	NBC
1983
1983	Tales of the Gold Monkey	"Pilot"	John W. Corso, Frank Grieco, Robert George Freer	ABC
1983	Casablanca	"Jenny"	E. Preston Ames, Bill Harp	NBC
1983	Cheers	"Give Me a Ring Sometime"	Richard Sylbert, George Gaines	NBC
1983	Dynasty	"Fathers and Sons"	Tom Trimble, Paul Sylos, Brock Broughton	ABC
1983	Fame	"Not in Kansas Anymore"	Ira Diamond, Joseph Stone	NBC
1983	Seven Brides for Seven Brothers	"The Rescue"	Hub Braden, Donald J. Remacle	CBS
1983	St. Elsewhere	"Pilot"	James Hulsey, Jacqueline Webber, Ernie Bishop, Michele Guiol	NBC
1984
1984	The Duck Factory	"Pilot"	James Hulsey, Bruce Kay	NBC
1984	Dynasty	"The Voice, Part 2"	Tom Trimble, Brock Broughton	ABC
1984	Fame	"Catch a Falling Star"	Ira Diamond, Leonard A. Mazzola	Syndicated
1984	St. Elsewhere	"After Dark"	Jacqueline Webber, Patricia S. Bruner	NBC
1985
1985	Miami Vice	"No Exit"	Jeffrey Howard, Robert Lacey Jr.	NBC
1985	Dynasty	"Royal Wedding"	Tom Trimble, Brock Broughton	ABC
1985	Murder, She Wrote	"Broadway Malady"	Hub Braden, Frank Lombardo	CBS
1985	Murder, She Wrote	"Capitol Offense"	Leslie Parsons, Robert Wingo	CBS
1986
1986	St. Elsewhere	"Time Heals"	Jacqueline Webber, Norman Rockett	NBC
1986	The Golden Girls	"Pilot"	Edward Stephenson	NBC
1986	Moonlighting	"The Dream Sequence Always Rings Twice"	James J. Agazzi, Bill Harp	ABC
1986	Murder, She Wrote	"Sing a Song of Murder"	Leslie Parsons, Robert Wingo	CBS
1986	Murder, She Wrote	"Widow, Weep for Me"	Hub Braden, Wally White	CBS
1987
1987	L.A. Law	"Pilot"	Jeffrey L. Goldstein, Richard D. Kent	NBC
1987	Max Headroom	"Blipverts"	Richard B. Lewis, Bernard P. Cutler, Leslie McCarthy-Frankenheimer	ABC
1987	Dynasty	"A Love Remembered, Part 2"	Tom Trimble, Brock Broughton	ABC
1987	Moonlighting	"Atomic Shakespeare"	James J. Agazzi, Bill Harp	ABC
1987	Murder, She Wrote	"No Accounting for Murder"	Leslie Parsons, Peter Samish, Robert Wingo	CBS
1988
1988	Beauty and the Beast	"Pilot"	John B. Mansbridge, Charles Korian	CBS
1988	Frank's Place	"Cool and the Gang, Part 2"	Jacqueline Webber, Daniel Loren May	CBS
1988	Moonlighting	"Here's Living with You, Kid"	James J. Agazzi, Bill Harp	ABC
1989
1989	Moonlighting	"A Womb with a View"	James J. Agazzi, Bill Harp	ABC
1989	Murder, She Wrote	"Snow White, Blood Red"	Leslie Parsons, Peter Samish, Robert Wingo	CBS
1989	Murphy Brown	"Mama Said"	Roy Christopher, Steve Rostine	CBS
1989	Roseanne	"Lover's Lanes"	Garvin Eddy	ABC
1989	Star Trek: The Next Generation	"Elementary, Dear Data"	Richard D. James, Jim Mees	Syndicated
1989	Thirtysomething	"Michael Writes a Story"	Brandy Alexander, Mary Ann Biddle	ABC

=== 1990s ===
Year	Program	Episode(s)	Nominees	Network
1990
1990	Star Trek: The Next Generation	"Sins of the Father"	Richard D. James, Jim Mees	Syndicated
1990	Murder, She Wrote	"Night of the Tarantula"	Hub Braden, Robert Wingo	CBS
1990	Quantum Leap	"So Help Me God"	Cameron Birnie, Robert L. Zilliox	NBC
1990	Thirtysomething	"Michael's Campaign"	Brandy Alexander, Mary Ann Biddle	ABC
1990	Twin Peaks	"Pilot"	Patricia Norris, Leslie Morales	ABC
1991
1991	Dinosaurs	"The Mating Dance"	John C. Mula, Brian Savegar, Kevin Pfeiffer	ABC
1991	Murder, She Wrote	"Murder Plain and Simple"	Hub Braden, Robert Wingo	CBS
1991	Murphy Brown	"Retreat"	Roy Christopher, Steve Rostine	CBS
1991	Quantum Leap	"The Boogieman"	Cameron Birnie, Robert L. Zilliox	NBC
1991	Star Trek: The Next Generation	"The Best of Both Worlds, Part 2"	Richard D. James, Jim Mees	Syndicated
1992
1992	Northern Exposure	"Cicely"	Woody Crocker, Kenneth Berg, Gene Serdena	CBS
1992	Murder, She Wrote	"Murder on Madison Avenue"	Hub Braden, Mary Dodson, Fred S. Winston	CBS
1992	Quantum Leap	"Song for the Soul"	Cameron Birnie, Ellen Dambros-Williams, Robert L. Zilliox	NBC
1992	Star Trek: The Next Generation	"Unification, Part 2"	Richard D. James, Jim Mees	Syndicated
1993
1993	Homefront	"The Traveling Lemo All-Stars"	Dean Edward Mitzner, Tom Pedigo	ABC
1993	Northern Exposure	"Revelations"	Woody Crocker, Kenneth Berg, Lori Melendy, Robert Stover	CBS
1993	Quantum Leap	"Blood Moon"	Cameron Birnie, Ellen Dambros-Williams, Robert L. Zilliox	NBC
1993	Star Trek: Deep Space Nine	"Emissary"	Herman F. Zimmerman, Randall McIlvain, Mickey S. Michaels	Syndicated
1993	The Young Indiana Jones Chronicles	"Vienna, 1908"	Gavin Bocquet, Keith Pain, Maggie Gray	ABC
1994
1994	NYPD Blue	"Serge the Concierge"	Paul Eads, Mary Ann Biddle	ABC
1994	Frasier	"A Midwinter Night's Dream"	Roy Christopher, Sharon Viljoen, Ron Olsen	NBC
1994	Star Trek: The Next Generation	"Thine Own Self"	Richard D. James, Andrew Neskoromny, Jim Mees	Syndicated
1994	The Young Indiana Jones Chronicles	"Paris, 1919"	Gavin Bocquet, Ricky Eyres	ABC
1995
1995	Cybill	"Virgin, Mother, Crone"	Garvin Eddy, Rochelle Moser	CBS
1995	Frasier	"The Innkeepers"	Roy Christopher, Ron Olsen	NBC
1995	Friends	"The One Where Rachel Finds Out"	John Shaffner, Greg J. Grande	NBC
1995	Murder, She Wrote	"Death 'N' Denial"	Hub Braden, Mary Dodson, Bill Gregory, Lee Poll	CBS
1995	NYPD Blue	"Dirty Socks"	Paul Eads, Richard C. Hankins, Mary Ann Biddle	ABC
1996
1996	Murder One	"Chapter One"	Paul Eads, Mindy Roffman, Mary Ann Biddle	ABC
1996	Cybill	"Wedding Bell Blues"	Garvin Eddy, Rochelle Moser	CBS
1996	Murder, She Wrote	"Nan's Ghost"	Hub Braden, Mary Dodson, Lee Poll, Bill Gregory	CBS
1996	NYPD Blue	"Hollie and the Blowfish"	Richard C. Hankins, Alan E. Muraoka, David Smith	ABC
1996	The X-Files	"Jose Chung's From Outer Space"	Graeme Murray, Shirley Inget	Fox
1997
1997	The X-Files	"Memento Mori"	Graeme Murray, Gary Pembroke Allen, Shirley Inget	Fox
1997	The Drew Carey Show	"New York and Queens"	John Shaffner, Joe Stewart, Edward J. McDonald	ABC
1997	NYPD Blue	"A Wrenching Experience"	Richard C. Hankins, David Smith	ABC
1997	7th Heaven	"The Color of God"	Patricia Van Ryker, Mary Ann Good	The WB
1997	Star Trek: Deep Space Nine	"Trials and Tribble-ations"	Herman F. Zimmerman, Randall McIlvain, Laura Richarz	Syndicated
1998
1998	The X-Files	"The Post-Modern Prometheus"	Graeme Murray, Greg Loewen, Shirley Inget	Fox
1998	Ally McBeal	"Boy to the World"	Peter Politanoff, Diane O'Connell	Fox
1998	Dharma & Greg	"Invasion of the Buddy Snatcher"	John Shaffner, Anne H. Ahrens	ABC
1998	Nothing Sacred	"Hodie Christus Natus Est"	Michael Baugh, Cate Bangs, William Vail	ABC
1998	Star Trek: Deep Space Nine	"Far Beyond the Stars"	Herman F. Zimmerman, Randall McIlvain, Laura Richarz	Syndicated
1999
1999	Buddy Faro	"Pilot"	Jon Hutman, Tony Fanning, Ellen Totleben	CBS
1999	Ally McBeal	"Making Spirits Bright"	Peter Politanoff, Diane O'Connell	Fox
1999	The Sopranos	"The Sopranos"	Edward Pisoni, Diann Duthie, Jessica Lanier	HBO
1999	Star Trek: Deep Space Nine	"Prodigal Daughter"	Herman F. Zimmerman, Randall McIlvain, Laura Richarz	Syndicated
1999	The X-Files	"One Son"	Corey Kaplan, Lauren E. Polizzi, Sandy Getzler, Timothy Stepeck	Fox

Outstanding Art Direction for a Single-Camera Series

=== 2000s ===
Year	Program	Episode(s)	Nominees	Network
2000
2000	The West Wing	"Pilot"	Jon Hutman, Tony Fanning, Ellen Totleben	NBC
2000	Judging Amy	"Spoil the Child"	Michael L. Mayer, Kathy Curtis-Cahill	CBS
2000	Sex and the City	"They Shoot People, Don't They?"	Jeremy Conway, Ed Check, Karin Wiesel	HBO
2000	The Sopranos	"House Arrest"	Bob Shaw, Scott P. Murphy, Janet Shaw	HBO
2001
2001	Boston Public	"Chapter One"	Paul Eads, Mindy Roffman, Jan Pascale	Fox
2001	CSI: Crime Scene Investigation	"Friends and Lovers"	Cherie Baker, Brenda Meyers-Ballard	CBS
2001	Sex and the City	"Where There's Smoke"	Jeremy Conway, Ed Check, Karin Wiesel	HBO
2001	The Sopranos	"Amour Fou"	Bob Shaw, Scott P. Murphy, Janet Shaw	HBO
2001	The West Wing	"Noël"	Kenneth Hardy, Ellen Totleben	NBC
2002
2002	Alias	"Truth Be Told"	Scott Chambliss, Cece Destefano, Karen Manthey	ABC
2002	Six Feet Under	"Back to the Garden"	Daniel Ross, Suzuki Ingerslev, Rusty Lipscomb	HBO
2002	Six Feet Under	"Pilot"	Marcia Hinds, Thomas T. Taylor, Susan Mina Eschelbach	HBO
2002	24	"12:00 a.m. – 1:00 a.m."	Carlos Barbosa, Tim Beach, Ellen Brill	Fox
2002	The West Wing	"Manchester, Part 2"	Kenneth Hardy, Ellen Totleben	NBC
2003
2003	Without a Trace	"Birthday Boy"	Aaron Osborne, Jeannie Gunn	CBS
2003	Alias	"Phase One"	Scott Chambliss, Cece Destefano, Karen Manthey	ABC
2003	Sex and the City	"Plus One Is the Loneliest Number"	Jeremy Conway, Fredda Slavin, Stephen H. Carter, Karin Wiesel	HBO
2003	Six Feet Under	"The Opening"	Suzuki Ingerslev, Phil Dagort, Rusty Lipscomb	HBO
2003	The West Wing	"20 Hours in America"	Kenneth Hardy, Ellen Totleben	NBC
2004
2004	Carnivàle	"Milfay"	Bernt Amadeus Capra, Jeremy Cassells, Leslie McCarthy-Frankenheimer, Dan Bishop, Roger L. King, Gary Kosko, Sara Andrews	HBO
2004	Alias	"Taken"	Scott Chambliss, Cece Destefano, Karen Manthey	ABC
2004	Deadwood	"Deep Water," "The Trial of Jack McCall," "Bullock Returns to the Camp"	Maria Caso, James J. Murakami, John F. Brown	HBO
2004	The Sopranos	"In Camelot," "Cold Cuts," "The Test Dream"	Bob Shaw, Scott P. Murphy, Janet Shaw	HBO
2004	The West Wing	"Gaza"	Kenneth Hardy, Ellen Totleben	NBC
2005
2005	Deadwood	"Requiem for a Gleet," "Complications," "Childish Things"	Maria Caso, James J. Murakami, David Potts, Ernie Bishop	HBO
2005	Carnivàle	"Old Cherry Blossom Road," "Damascus, NE," "Outside New Canaan"	Dan Bishop, Roger L. King, David Morong, Joyce Anne Gilstrap	HBO
2005	Cold Case	"Factory Girls"	Corey Kaplan, Sandy Getzler, Timothy Stepeck	CBS
2005	Desperate Housewives	"Suspicious Minds"	Thomas A. Walsh, Erik Carlson, Erica Rogalla	ABC
2005	Six Feet Under	"Grinding the Corn," "Bomb Shelter," "Untitled"	Suzuki Ingerslev, Kristan Andrews, Rusty Lipscomb	HBO
2006
2006	Rome	"Caesarion," "Triumph," "Kalends of February"	Joseph Bennett, Domenico Sica, Christina Onori	HBO
2006	Desperate Housewives	"There's Something About a War"	Thomas A. Walsh, Erik Carlson, Erica Rogalla	ABC
2006	House	"Autopsy," "Distractions," "Skin Deep"	Derek R. Hill, Danielle Berman	Fox
2006	Nip/Tuck	"Ben White"	Liz Kay, Ellen Brill	FX
2006	Six Feet Under	"Hold My Hand," "Singing for Our Lives," "Everyone's Waiting"	Suzuki Ingerslev, Kristan Andrews, Rusty Lipscomb	HBO
2007
2007	Rome	"Heroes of the Republic," "Philippi," "Deus Impeditio Esuritori Nullus (No God Can Stop a Hungry Man)"	Joseph Bennett, Anthony Pratt, Carlo Serafin, Christina Onori	HBO
2007	Deadwood	"Tell Your God to Ready for Blood," "True Colors," "Amateur Night"	Maria Caso, David Potts, Ernie Bishop	HBO
2007	Heroes	"Genesis"	Curtis A. Schnell, Daniel J. Vivanco, Crista Schneider	NBC
2007	Shark	"Teacher's Pet"	Suzuki Ingerslev, Catherine Smith, Rusty Lipscomb	CBS
2007	The Tudors	"In Cold Blood"	Tom Conroy, Alan Gilmore, Eliza Solesbury	Showtime
2007	Ugly Betty	"The Box and the Bunny"	Mark Worthington, Jim Wallis, Archie D'Amico	ABC
2008
2008	Mad Men	"Smoke Gets in Your Eyes"	Bob Shaw, Henry Dunn, Rena DeAngelo	AMC
2008	Dexter	"That Night, a Forest Grew"	Anthony Cowley, Linda Spheeris	Showtime
2008	Heroes	"Out of Time"	Ruth Ammon, Matthew C. Jacobs, Ron Franco	NBC
2008	Mad Men	"Shoot"	Dan Bishop, Christopher Brown, Amy Wells	AMC
2008	Pushing Daisies	"Pie-lette"	Michael Wylie, William J. Durrell Jr., Halina Siwolop	ABC
2008	Ugly Betty	"How Betty Got Her Grieve Back"	Mark Worthington, Jim Wallis, Archie D'Amico	ABC
2009
2009	Pushing Daisies	"Dim Sum Lose Some"	Michael Wylie, Kenneth J. Creber, Halina Siwolop	ABC
2009	Bones	"The Hero in the Hold"	Michael L. Mayer, Greg Richman, Kimberly Wannop	Fox
2009	Heroes	"Cold Snap"	Ruth Ammon, Sandy Getzler, Ron Franco	NBC
2009	Mad Men	"The Jet Set"	Dan Bishop, Christopher Brown, Amy Wells	AMC
2009	True Blood	"Burning House of Love," "Cold Ground," "Sparks Fly Out"	Suzuki Ingerslev, Catherine Smith, Laura Richarz	HBO
2009	The Tudors	"The Northern Uprising," "Dissension and Punishment"	Tom Conroy, Colman Corish, Crispian Sallis	Showtime

=== 2010s ===
Year	Program	Episode(s)	Nominees	Network
2010
2010	The Tudors	"Sixth and the Final Wife"	Tom Conroy, Colman Corish, Crispian Sallis	Showtime
2010	Glee	"Pilot"	Mark Hutman, Christopher Brown, Barbara Munch	Fox
2010	Heroes	"Brave New World"	Ruth Ammon, Sandy Getzler, Ron Franco	NBC
2010	Lost	"Ab Aeterno"	Zack Grobler, Matthew C. Jacobs, Carol Bayne Kelley	ABC
2010	Modern Family	"Moon Landing," "Fears"	Richard Berg, Amber Haley	ABC
2010	True Blood	"Never Let Me Go," "I Will Rise Up," "Frenzy"	Suzuki Ingerslev, Catherine Smith, Laura Richarz	HBO
2011
2011	Boardwalk Empire	"Boardwalk Empire"	Bob Shaw, Doug Huszti, Debra Schutt	HBO
2011	The Borgias	"Lucrezia's Wedding"	François Séguin, Jonathan McKinstry, Judit Varga	Showtime
2011	Mad Men	"Public Relations"	Dan Bishop, Christopher Brown, Claudette Didul	AMC
2011	Modern Family	"Halloween"	Richard Berg, Amber Haley	ABC
2011	True Blood	"Beautifully Broken"	Suzuki Ingerslev, Catherine Smith, Laura Richarz	HBO
2012
2012	Boardwalk Empire	"Peg of Old," "Battles of the Century," "To the Lost"	Bill Groom, Adam Scher, Carol Silverman	HBO
2012	Game of Thrones	"Garden of Bones," "The Ghost of Harrenhal," "A Man Without Honor"	Gemma Jackson, Frank Walsh, Tina Jones	HBO
2012	Downton Abbey	"Episode 4"	Donal Woods, Charmian Adams, Judy Farr	PBS
2012	Justified	"Cut Ties"	David Blass, Oana Bogdan Miller, Shauna Aronson	FX
2012	Mad Men	"At the Codfish Ball"	Dan Bishop, Christopher Brown, Claudette Didul	AMC
2013
2013	Boardwalk Empire	"Sunday Best," "Two Imposters," "Margate Sands"	Bill Groom, Adam Scher, Carol Silverman	HBO
2013	The Borgias	"Siblings"	Jonathan McKinstry, Adam O'Neill, Judit Varga	Showtime
2013	Downton Abbey	"Episode 7"	Donal Woods, Mark Kebby, Gina Cromwell	PBS
2013	Game of Thrones	"Valar Dohaeris," "Kissed by Fire"	Gemma Jackson, Andy Thomson, Rob Cameron	HBO
2013	True Blood	"Whatever I Am, You Made Me," "Let's Boot and Rally," "Sunset"	Suzuki Ingerslev, Catherine Smith, Ron Franco	HBO

== Programs with multiple awards ==
Totals are combined with Production Design for a Narrative Contemporary or Fantasy Program and Production Design for a Narrative Period Program.

5 awards

- Boardwalk Empire (consecutive)

4 awards

- Game of Thrones (3 consecutive)

2 awards

- Rome (consecutive)
- The X-Files (consecutive)

== Programs with multiple nominations ==
Totals are combined with Production Design for a Narrative Contemporary or Fantasy Program and Production Design for a Narrative Period Program.

11 nominations

- Murder, She Wrote

7 nominations

- Mad Men

6 nominations

- True Blood

5 nominations

- Boardwalk Empire
- Downton Abbey
- Dynasty
- Game of Thrones
- Mission: Impossible
- Six Feet Under
- Star Trek: The Next Generation
- The West Wing

4 nominations

- Heroes
- Moonlighting
- NYPD Blue
- Quantum Leap
- The Sopranos
- Star Trek: Deep Space Nine
- The X-Files

3 nominations

- Alias
- Deadwood
- Fame
- Hart to Hart
- Sex and the City
- St. Elsewhere
- The Tudors

2 nominations

- The Adams Chronicles
- Ally McBeal
- The Borgias
- Carnivàle
- Cybill
- Desperate Housewives
- Frasier
- Hill Street Blues
- Justified
- Mannix
- Maude
- Modern Family
- Murphy Brown
- Northern Exposure
- Pushing Daisies
- Rome
- Roots
- Thirtysomething
- Ugly Betty
- The Young Indiana Jones Chronicles
