= Bruce Kay =

American set decorator

- Occupation: Set decorator
- Years active: 1969–1993

Bruce Kay is an American set decorator. He was nominated for an Academy Award in the category Best Art Direction for the film The Brink's Job.

In addition to his Academy Award nomination, he won a Primetime Emmy Award in the category Outstanding Art Direction for his work on the television program The Duck Factory. His win was shared with James Hulsey.

== Selected filmography ==
- The Brink's Job (1978; co-nominated with Dean Tavoularis, Angelo P. Graham and George R. Nelson)
