= John M. Dwyer =

American set decorator (1935–2018)

- Born: August 25, 1935; Detroit, Michigan, U.S.
- Died: September 15, 2018 (aged 83); Encinitas, California, U.S.
- Occupation: Set decorator
- Years active: 1966-2004

John M. Dwyer (August 25, 1935 – September 15, 2018) was an American set decorator. He was nominated for an Academy Award in the category Best Art Direction for the film Coal Miner's Daughter, and won a Primetime Emmy Award in 1981 for The Gangster Chronicles, sharing the win with Howard E. Johnson and Robert George Freer. He worked on nearly 70 films and television shows from 1966 to 2004.

== Selected filmography ==
- Star Trek (1967–1969) (nominated for Emmy Award with Matt Jeffries)
- Jaws (1975)
- Coal Miner's Daughter (1980) (nominated for Academy Award with John W. Corso)
- Thief (1981)
- The Thing (1982)
- Star Trek IV: The Voyage Home (1986)
- Star Trek: The Next Generation (1987–88)
- Star Trek V: The Final Frontier (1989)
- Black Rain (1989)
- Star Trek Generations (1994)
- Star Trek: First Contact (1996)
- Star Trek: Insurrection (1998)
- Star Trek: Nemesis (2002)
