= The Post-Modern Prometheus =

- The X-Files episode
- Scully (left) and Mulder (right) take The Great Mutato (center) to a Cher concert. The episode was filmed in black-and-white, in a stylistic nod to the 1931 film Frankenstein.
- Episode no.: Season 5 Episode 5
- Directed by: Chris Carter
- Written by: Chris Carter
- Production code: 5X06
- Original air date: November 30, 1997
- Running time: 46 minutes

Guest appearances
- Tracey Bell as Cher; Lloyd Berry as Old Man Pollidori; Stewart Gale as Izzy Berkowitz; Chris Giacoletti as Booger; Dana Grahame as Reporter; Jean-Yves Hammel as Izzy's Friend; C. Ernst Harth as Huge Man; Vitaliy Kravchenko as JJ; John O'Hurley as Dr. Francis Pollidori; Chris Owens as The Great Mutato; Xantha Radley as Waitress; Miriam Smith as Elizabeth Pollidori; Jerry Springer as Himself; Pattie Tierce as Shaineh Berkowitz; Jean-Yves Hammel as Goat Boy

Episode chronology
← Previous "Detour"	Next → "Christmas Carol"
- The X-Files season 5

"The Post-Modern Prometheus" is the fifth episode of the fifth season of the American science fiction television series The X-Files and originally aired on the Fox network on November 30, 1997. Written and directed by series creator Chris Carter, "The Post-Modern Prometheus" is a "Monster-of-the-Week" episode, a stand-alone plot which is unconnected to the overarching mythology of The X-Files. "The Post-Modern Prometheus" earned a Nielsen household rating of 11.5, being watched by 18.68 million viewers upon its initial broadcast. The episode was nominated for seven awards at the 1998 Emmys and won one. The entry generally received positive reviews; some reviewers called it a classic, with others calling it the most striking stand-alone episode of the show's fifth season.

The show centers on FBI special agents Fox Mulder (David Duchovny) and Dana Scully (Gillian Anderson) who work on cases linked to the paranormal, called X-Files. Mulder is a believer in the paranormal, while the skeptical Scully was initially assigned to debunk his work. In this episode, Mulder and Scully investigate reports of a mysterious creature that has impregnated a middle-aged woman. They find that the "monster", nicknamed The Great Mutato, is the genetic creation of a Frankenstein-like doctor. The Great Mutato is at first ostracized, but later accepted, by his community.

Carter's story draws heavily on Mary Shelley's 1818 novel Frankenstein; or, The Modern Prometheus and particularly on James Whale's 1931 film version of the story. The episode was even filmed in black-and-white, with a sky backdrop created to imitate the style of old Frankenstein films. The script had been written specifically with singer Cher and actress Roseanne Barr in mind, but both were unavailable at the time of shooting. Talk-show host Jerry Springer appeared as himself, and Chris Owens—who appeared in later episodes as FBI agent Jeffrey Spender—played The Great Mutato. Owens wore makeup and prosthetics that took several hours to apply.

== Plot ==
The episode begins in the guise of a comic book. FBI special agent Fox Mulder (David Duchovny) receives a letter from Shaineh Berkowitz (Pattie Tierce), a single mother who claims to have been impregnated, while unconscious, by an unknown presence 18 years ago, resulting in the birth of her son, Izzy (Stewart Gale). Now, following a similarly unexplained attack, she is pregnant again. She has heard about Fox Mulder's expertise in the paranormal from The Jerry Springer Show, and wants him to investigate.

Mulder and special agent Dana Scully (Gillian Anderson) travel to rural Albion, Indiana, where they meet Shaineh and her son Izzy, and learn that the description of the creature that attacked her, with a lumpy head and two mouths, is very similar to a comic book character invented by Izzy. His monstrous creation, called The Great Mutato, is inspired by a mysterious creature that has been seen by many of the locals. Izzy and his friends accompany the agents to a wooded area, where they see Mutato (Chris Owens) from a distance.

They meet an old man who angrily tells them that there are no monsters, and sends them to see his son, a geneticist named Francis Pollidori (John O'Hurley). Dr. Pollidori shows them his experiments studying the Hox gene, using the fruit fly Drosophila. This presentation includes images of a mutated fly whose legs are growing out of its mouth. He tells the agents that the same kind of experiment could, in theory, be performed on humans. Afterward, Mulder tells Scully that he believes that Dr. Pollidori, acting as a modern-day Victor Frankenstein, has created The Great Mutato.

Later, Dr. Pollidori's wife Elizabeth (Miriam Smith) is knocked unconscious and attacked in the same manner as Shaineh. At the crime scene, Mulder and Scully find a chemical residue from an agricultural agent used to anesthetize animals, which leads them to suspect Dr. Pollidori's father, who is a farmer. Dr. Pollidori comes to his father's house, angrily confronts him, and murders him. Later, Mutato, who lives with Pollidori Sr., finds his dead body and tearfully buries it in a barn.

Mulder and Scully go looking for Pollidori Sr. and find a shallow grave and photographs of the dead man with Mutato. Meanwhile, Dr. Pollidori leads an angry mob of townspeople to his father's house, demanding that Mulder and Scully turn the alleged murderer over to them. The agents find Mutato hiding in the basement as the crowd gathers upstairs. Someone accidentally sets the barn alight, and in the ensuing confusion, the mob realize that the agents are protecting the monster in the basement.

Mutato speaks to the crowd and explains that he was created 25 years before, and that he is the result of a genetic experiment by Dr. Pollidori. Unbeknownst to his son, Pollidori Sr. rescued Mutato and cared for him, but was unable to provide a friend or a mate for the boy. The old man attempted to emulate his scientist son's experiments, and tried to create hybrids from his farm animals. Mutato asks Dr. Pollidori to create a female companion for him, but the scientist says that he cannot—that Mutato was a mistake.

The townspeople realize that The Great Mutato is not a monster after all, and Dr. Pollidori is arrested for the murder of his father. Mulder feels that it is unjust for Mutato not to get a mate, and so he demands to see "the writer". In a fanciful, if not imagined, scene, Mulder and Scully take matters into their own hands and take Mutato, along with the townspeople, to a Cher concert. The episode ends with a shot of Mulder and Scully dancing, which slowly turns back into the comic book seen at the beginning of the episode.

== Production ==
=== Conception ===
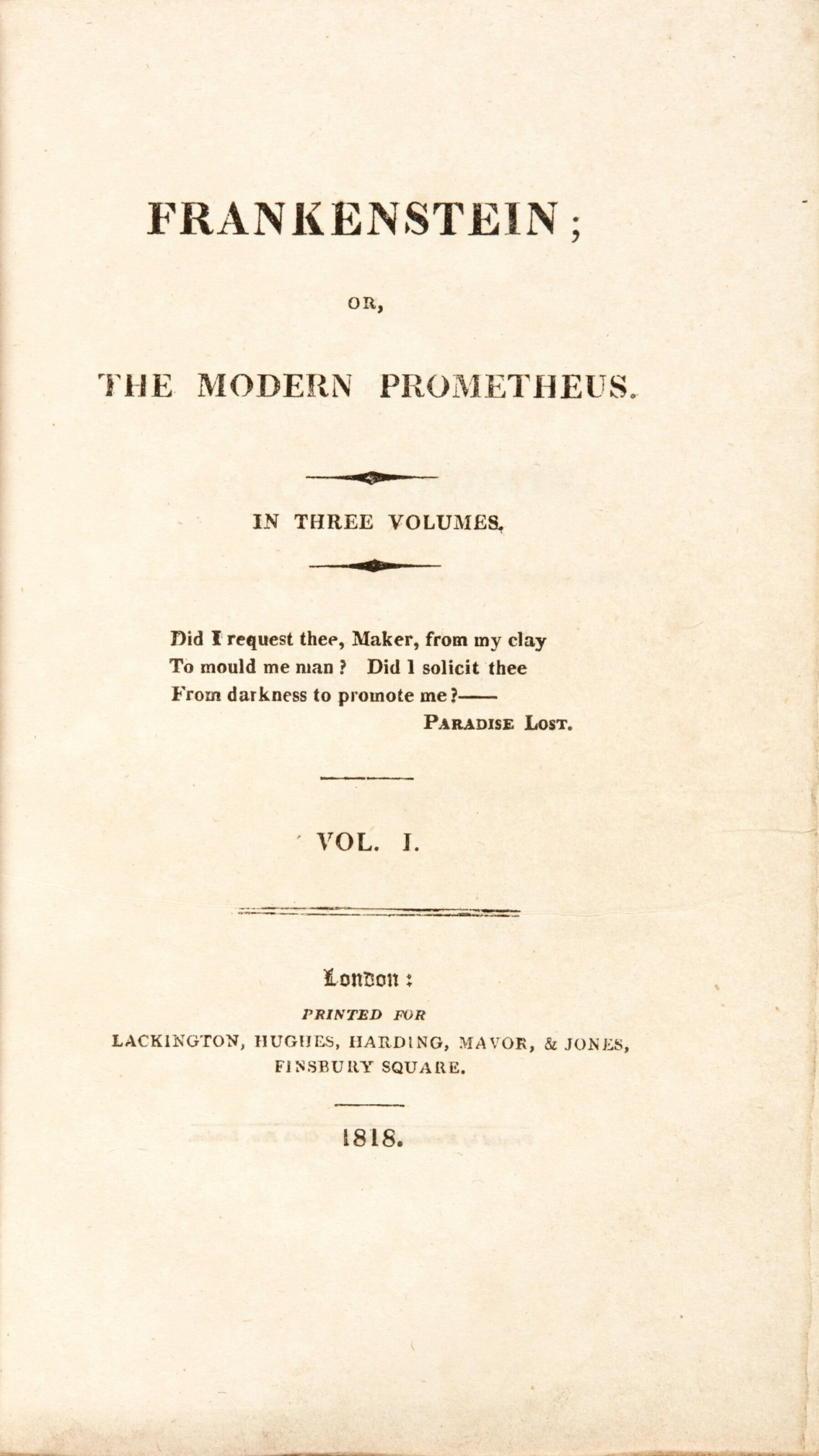
The episode was heavily inspired by Mary Shelley's novel Frankenstein.

Going into the fifth season of The X-Files, series creator Chris Carter noted, "we knew we were going to be hitting these very dramatic marks which were the mythology episodes, and we wanted to lighten, or leaven, the season with quirky episodes." Carter wanted to write a Frankenstein-inspired episode, but found it difficult to reconcile Mary Shelley's unbelievable tale with the style of the show. To achieve his vision, he wrote a script that blurred the real world with the X-Files reality and that had a distinct fantasy element. Carter combined elements of the original story with fairy tales and elements of folk tales.

In order to make the episode "as moving" as possible, Carter sought to echo elements of James Whale's 1931 film version of Frankenstein. He later noted that, by "using modern science, I took an old style, which is black and white, and an old approach, which is a kind of James Whale approach to science fiction, and came up with a story about a love-lorn monster".

The genetic engineering aspect of the story was developed with assistance from the series' science adviser, Anne Simon. Carter visited a friend of Simon, Dr. Thomas C. Kaufman at Indiana University in Bloomington, who had been able to genetically manipulate flies so that they grew legs from their eyes. After Carter had created the character of The Great Mutato, he discovered that cartoonist Matt Groening had already created a character with the same name—although with different pronunciation—for a comic book entry of The Simpsons. Carter contacted Groening, who gave Carter permission to use the name. Like two-thirds of the episodes of the series, "The Post-Modern Prometheus" is a "Monster-of-the-Week" episode, a stand-alone plot which is unconnected to the overarching mythology of The X-Files.

=== Casting ===
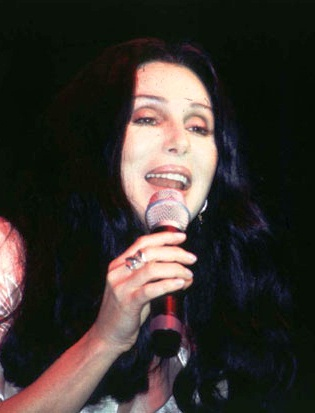
After viewing the episode, singer Cher came to regret turning down a cameo appearance.

Cher's music plays a large role in "The Post-Modern Prometheus", Chris Carter having written the episode after spending a summer listening to Cher records and developing a fixation on the singer. Carter knew that Cher's half-sister Georganne LaPiere was a major X-Files fan, and Carter learned through LaPiere that Cher herself was intrigued by the show and would be interested in making an X-Files guest appearance. Sitcom star Roseanne Barr also expressed an interest in guesting on The X-Files, and Carter wrote the part of Shaineh Berkowitz specifically for her.

Barr, however, was unavailable at the time of shooting—her projected role was filled by Pattie Tierce— while Cher passed on the proffered cameo appearance performing as herself, a decision for which she later expressed regret: "I wanted them to ask me to come on and act—then they just wanted me to come on and sing ... Just to come on and be myself wasn't anything I'd want to do until I saw [the finished episode]" — "Had I [foreseen] the quality of [it] I would have done it in a heartbeat." Cher did authorize the use of three of her tracks on the episode's soundtrack including "Walking in Memphis" heard at the episode's conclusion while ostensibly performed onstage by celebrity impersonator Tracey Bell—filmed in longshot, from the back and overhead—as Cher.

Although Bell was credited for the role, Cher's fans responded to the episode's premiere with online speculation as to whether the singer had pseudonymously appeared in the episode. Tabloid talk show host Jerry Springer appeared as himself. These casting choices went against a long-standing tradition on The X-Files of only casting actors who were not well-known.

Seinfeld regular John O'Hurley had auditioned for several roles on the show but Carter had not previously thought of him as "an X-Files actor". For the part of Dr. Pollidori, however, Carter considered him "the absolute perfect casting choice". Stewart Gale, who portrayed Izzy Berkowitz, was a non-actor who Carter saw "literally on the street one day" sitting in a car. Carter convinced Gale's father—who was initially suspicious of the director's credentials—to let Gale travel to Vancouver to take part in the episode. Izzy's friends were also played by inexperienced actors: One worked as a snake handler on the set of The X-Files feature film—the shooting of which overlapped that of season five—and the other worked at a Vancouver coffee shop that Carter frequented.

Chris Owens played the Great Mutato, and to many, he was unrecognizable in heavy makeup. Owens had played a younger version of The Smoking Man in two episodes of season four and was later cast as the recurring character of FBI special agent Jeffrey Spender. During his audition, Owens noted, "Chris said, 'Okay, did you ever see Elephant Man? ... What I'm looking for is dignity. He's got dignity. But he's definitely mutated.'" After Owens heeded Carter's instructions and attempted to bring dignity to the audition, Carter requested that he try it again "with less autism".

=== Filming ===
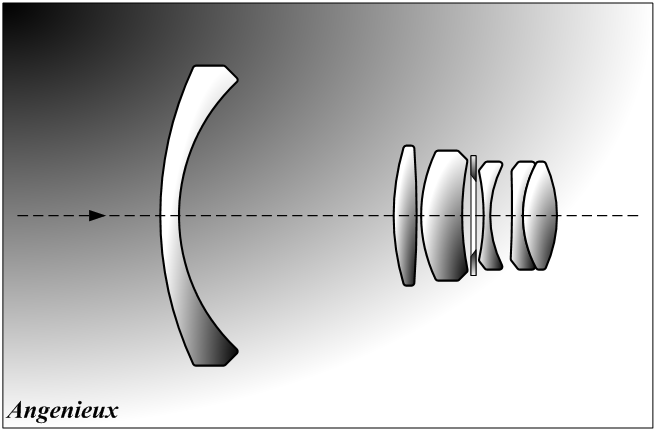
Director Chris Carter shot the episode using a wide-angle lens.

The first five seasons of The X-Files, including "The Post-Modern Prometheus", were filmed in Vancouver. It was the third episode of the program that Carter directed; he decided to film the episode in black-and-white—in homage to James Whale—which brought more challenges than he expected. The director of photography, Joel Ransom, had to spend longer than usual lighting the set because of the use of grayscale. The stormy skies in the episode, added to emulate the atmosphere of old Frankenstein movies, were a visual effect. Carter also used a wide-angle camera lens throughout the episode, which forced the actors to act directly to the camera, rather than to each other. According to Carter, it also enabled him to give scenes in the episode a more surreal staging than was usual for the show.

The makeup for the character of The Great Mutato was designed and created by special effects supervisor Tony Lindala. The Mutato mask went through several design iterations on paper, including 10–15 drawings and a color rendition. Constructed from latex and containing an articulated second mouth, it cost $40,000 and took between five and seven hours to apply. In addition to the mask, Chris Owens wore contact lenses and dentures. Owens later recalled that "the makeup had taken seven hours, and then I had sat around for three or four. And now I was going to sit in the dark, and I could only see out of one eye. They put a big contact lens in." Initial versions of the costume were deemed "too human looking" and so a newer design was chosen.

Lindala also created "Baby Mutato" costumes for the twin infants featured in The Jerry Springer Show scene, but the production crew had difficulty keeping the costumes on the children. Lindala later said, "[t]he little babies kept tearing their hair off, we kept gluing it back on." Lindala was happy that the episode was filmed in black and white, because it helped "the prosthetic [because] it is difficult to work in a foam piece that long and not recognize it as a painted, opaque, false translucency." Lindala later called the filming technique the "saving grace" of the episode. In addition, he later submitted his makeup for the episode to the Academy of Television Arts & Sciences in an attempt to be nominated for an Emmy Award.

=== Music and cultural references ===
The episode was scored by series composer Mark Snow, and was, according to him, his best episode score of the fifth season. He described the main theme as "a very dark, macabre, insidious sort of nasty waltz". The episode's main theme is also greatly inspired by The Elephant Man's theme song by John Morris. Three songs are heard in the versions sung by Cher during the episode: "The Sun Ain't Gonna Shine Anymore", "Gypsies, Tramps & Thieves" and "Walking in Memphis". The latter is played at the end of the episode when the agents take The Great Mutato to a Cher concert. In the episode, the character watches Cher's 1985 movie Mask, and derives comfort from the loving relationship between Cher's character and her son, who has a disfiguring genetic bone disorder. At the end of the episode, Mulder and Scully take The Great Mutato from his small town to a Cher concert, where she picks him out of the crowd to dance.

The episode contains several cultural references. First, the episode's title is a reference to both the subtitle for Shelley's original novel, The Modern Prometheus, and to the postmodernist school of thought. Postmodernism has been described as a "style and concept in the arts, architecture, and criticism, [that] is characterized by the self-conscious use of earlier styles and conventions, a mixing of different artistic styles and media, and a general distrust of theories." Furthermore, the Frankenstein-like doctor shares the name—albeit with a slightly different spelling—of Shelley's contemporary, John William Polidori, who was present at the conception of her novel. Several lines in the episode come directly from James Whale's 1931 movie Frankenstein.

== Themes ==
"The Post-Modern Prometheus" is the most obvious reference to Frankenstein made by the series, although traces of the story are seen elsewhere in the first season episode "Young at Heart" and the sixth season episode "The Beginning". In addition, the series' overarching mythology revolves around shadowy Syndicate leaders who salvage alien spacecraft for their own technological use and create human-alien hybrids. The episode contains themes relating to motherhood and sexuality. According to film studies writer Linda Badley, this episode, and season four's "Home", foreshadow Scully's impending motherhood and her realization, in following episodes "Christmas Carol" and "Emily", that she has been used to create a human-alien hybrid, Emily.

Diane Negra, in her book Off-White Hollywood: American Culture and Ethnic Female Stardom, points out that while The Great Mutato impregnates both Shaineh Berkowitz and Elizabeth Pollidori without their consent or knowledge, it is "an oversimplification" to label the monster as a rapist, because both Berkowitz and Pollidori "desire for children through unconventional means". Thus, Mutato's acts allow for the two women to get what they desperately desire in a moment of "magical resolution".

Despite her physical absence from the entry, Cher's presence can be felt throughout the narrative. Negra argues that Cher's "flamboyant and self-authored body" is used as a metaphor for "the possibility of self-transformation". In addition, her voice, heard via songs like "Walking in Memphis", is associated with the idea of "circumvent[ing] patriarchy." Negra notes that Cher's music is used in scenes during The Great Mutato's sexual encounters with women. Negra asserts that "this juxtaposition of sound and image cues our perception that we have entered the realm of carnival where the normal order of things is inverted."

Emily VanDerWerff of The A.V. Club reasons that the ending was not the actual conclusion of the episode, but rather the fanciful and elaborate happy ending that was concocted by Izzy Berkowitz, the writer of the comic book, after talking to Mulder. In this manner, VanDerWerff notes, "the episode abandons logic and reality and, for lack of a better word, transcends." Meghan Deans from Tor.com postulates that the entire episode never happened "[f]rom a canonical perspective" due to the entry's comic book setting, the various meta-references and the "happy ending".

== Reception ==
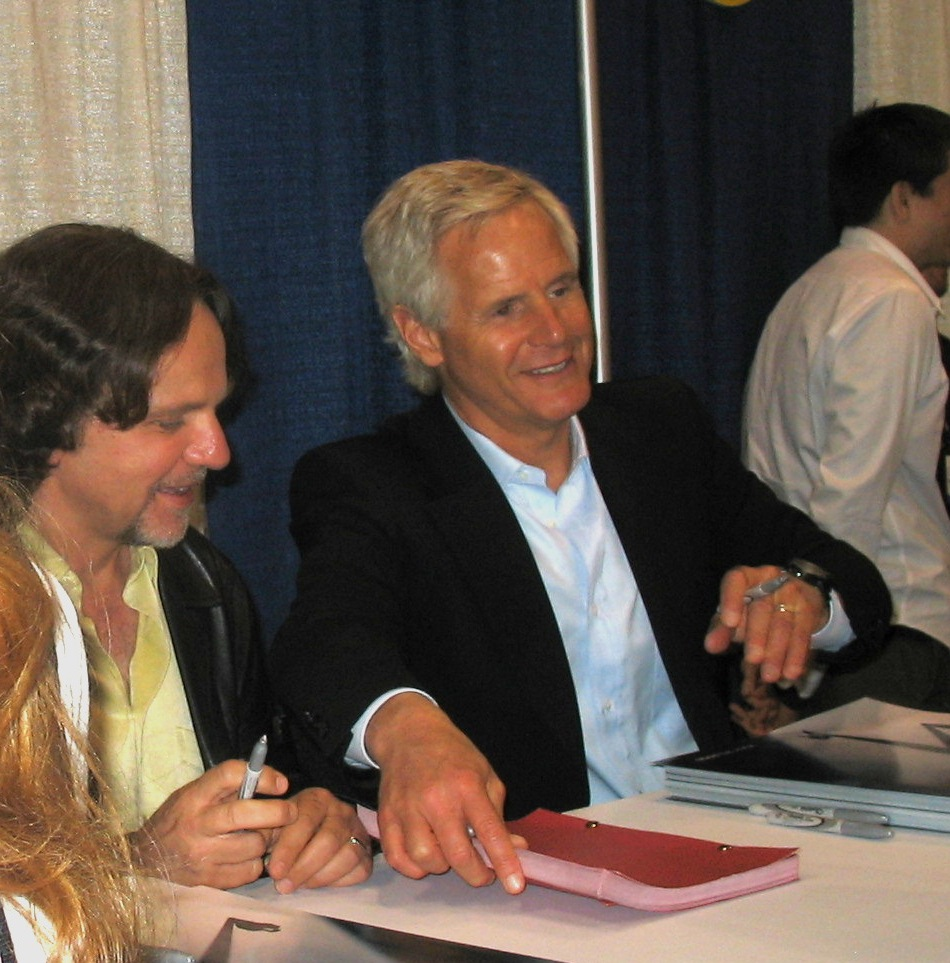
Chris Carter was nominated for both Outstanding Writing and Outstanding Directing at the 50th Primetime Emmy Awards.

=== Ratings ===
"The Post-Modern Prometheus" was first broadcast in the United States on November 30, 1997, on the Fox network, and was first broadcast in the United Kingdom on March 29, 1998, on Sky One. The episode earned a Nielsen rating of 11.5, with a 16 share, meaning that roughly 11.5 percent of all television-equipped households and 16 percent of households watching television were tuned in. It was viewed by 18.68 million viewers. "The Post-Modern Prometheus" was the eleventh most watched television program for the week ending November 30.

=== Reviews ===
"The Post-Modern Prometheus" received generally positive reviews from critics. Mike Duffy, a Knight Ridder correspondent, wrote a largely positive article on the episode, noting that although the episode was special, this did not make it feel like a gimmick. He wrote, "when most shows blow promotional smoke about 'a very special episode,' it's best to check the Hollywood Hype-O-Meter for wretched, excessive buzzing [but] what sounds like a gimmick—'a very special black-and-white episode' loosely based on the horror movie classic Frankenstein actually turns out to be a ripping good ride on 'X-Files' creator Chris Carter's wigged-out storytelling train."

A review from the Mobile Register wrote that "Like the very best X-Files episodes, this one combines a generous amount of humor with its horror." In a review of the entire fifth season, Michael Sauter of Entertainment Weekly said that "The Post-Modern Prometheus" was the "most striking" of the season's stand-alone episodes. Emily VanDerWerff awarded the episode with an "A" grade, and, despite noting the silliness of the story and the fact that most of the characters function as stereotypes, wrote that "'Prometheus' just works". In a 2000 review of season five for the New Straits Times, Francis Dass called "The Post-Modern Prometheus" a "fun episode".

Lionel Green of the Sand Mountain Reporter named the entry the greatest episode of the series and called the ending "one of the most uplifting finales in the series." Writing for the Daily News, Eric Mink gave the episode a rating of four stars and praised it as an outstanding episode in a weak early fifth season of the show. He said that the two leads acted flawlessly and that Chris Owens' performance as The Great Mutato was especially touching. He concluded that, "[w]ith Shelley's classic as inspiration, Carter and company have created a classic of their own."

Elaine Linere from the Corpus Christi Caller-Times called the episode "brilliantly written" and named it "a classic among many for this always-intriguing, ever-inventive series." She particularly praised the "heart-tugging, romantic" ending. Matthew Gilbert of The Boston Globe called the episode "a memorable X-Files from start to finish", due in part to its "extraordinary visual flair" and "atmospheric black and white" footage. Furthermore, Gilbert positively critiqued Carter's writing and directing, saying he "keeps his balance between drama, low-key humor, [and] allusive wit".

Margaret Lyons of New York called the entry "one of the great TV episodes of all time". Nick De Semlyen and James White of Empire named it the fifth "greatest" episode of the series and wrote that "[Chris Carter] plays with style and form, turning the entire episode into a loving homage to Universal monster movies in general and James Whale's 1931 Frankenstein in particular". In the 1999 FX Thanksgiving Marathon, containing fan-selected episodes, "The Post-Modern Prometheus" was presented as the "Best Stand-Alone Episode". Connie Ogle from The Miami Herald named The Great Mutato one of "the greatest monsters" that were featured on The X-Files.

Robert Shearman, in his book Wanting to Believe: A Critical Guide to The X-Files, Millennium & The Lone Gunmen, rated the episode two stars out of five and criticized various elements of the episode's direction. The author wrote: "Chris Carter the writer has come up with something playful and light and charming. And Chris Carter the director has stamped all over it and made it so arch and obvious and dull that it kills it stone dead." Shearman applauded the idea of "a town which feels like an X-Files audience", but he derided the episode's comic book setting and wrote that "this play on post-modernism just doesn't make any sense [in that format, because] a comic has action, a way of jumping from frame to frame ... this is languorous and self-indulgent."

Paula Vitaris from Cinefantastique gave the episode a moderately negative review and awarded it one-and-a-half stars out of four. She wrote that the episode "falls flatter than the chemical pancakes used to anesthetize the victims of this episode" due to its "collection of situations and observances that bear little relation to each other." Vitaris also criticized the scene wherein various characters are compared to animals, and commented, "the mean spiritedness of [the plot] is mind-boggling". Finally, she called the episode's conclusion a "false ending".

=== Awards ===
The episode was nominated for seven awards at the 1998 Emmys by the Academy of Television Arts & Sciences, including Outstanding Directing and Outstanding Writing for Chris Carter. (Note: Outstanding Writing, Outstanding Directing, Outstanding Art Direction, Outstanding Cinematography, Outstanding Single-Picture Editing, Outstanding Makeup, Outstanding Music Composition.) Graeme Murray, Greg Loewen and Shirley Inget won the award for Outstanding Art Direction. Carter was also nominated for an award for Outstanding Directing by the Directors Guild of America.

== Bibliography ==
- Badley, Linda (2000). "Scully Hits the Glass Ceiling: Postmodernism, Postfeminism, Posthumanism and The X-Files". In Helford, Elyce Rae (ed.). Fantasy Girls: Gender in the New Universe of Science Fiction and Fantasy Television. Lanham, MD: Rowman & Littlefield. ISBN 9780847698356.
- Cornell, Paul; Day, Martin; Topping, Keith (1998). X-Treme Possibilities. London: Virgin. ISBN 9780753502280.
- Hurwitz, Matt; Knowles, Chris (2008). The Complete X-Files: Behind the Series the Myths and the Movies. San Rafael, CA: Insight Editions. ISBN 9781933784724.
- Koven, Mikel J. (2010). "The X-Files". In Lavery, David (ed.). The Essential Cult TV Reader. Lexington, KY: University Press of Kentucky. ISBN 9780813125688.
- Lacy, Cherilyn (2004). "Women and Mad Science: Women as Witnesses to the Scientific Re-Creation of Humanity". In Bartter, Martha A. (ed.). The Utopian Fantastic: Selected Essays From the Twentieth International Conference on the Fantastic in the Arts. Westport, CT: Praeger. ISBN 9780313316357.
- Meisler, Andy (2000). The End and the Beginning: The Official Guide to the X-Files Season 6. New York City: HarperCollins. ISBN 9780061075957.
- Meisler, Andy (1999). Resist or Serve: The Official Guide to The X-Files, Vol. 4. New York City: HarperCollins. ISBN 9780061073090.
- Negra, Diane (2001). Off-White Hollywood: American Culture and Ethnic Female Stardom. London: Routledge. ISBN 9780415216784.
- Shearman, Robert (2009). Wanting to Believe: A Critical Guide to The X-Files, Millennium & The Lone Gunmen. Des Moines, IA: Mad Norwegian Press. ISBN 9780975944691.
