= Jeffrey Howard =

Jeffrey Howard may refer to:

- Jeffrey R. Howard (born 1955), American lawyer and United States circuit judge
- Jeffrey Howard (art director), American art director and production designer
- Jeff Howard (born 1983), American football coach

== See also ==
- Geoffrey Howard (disambiguation)
