= List of awards and nominations received by Moonlighting (TV series) =

Moonlighting is an American television series that aired on ABC from March 3, 1985, to May 14, 1989. The network aired a total of 66 episodes (67 in syndication as the pilot is split into two episodes). Starring Bruce Willis and Cybill Shepherd as private detectives, the show was a mixture of drama, comedy, and romance, and was considered to be one of the first successful and influential examples of comedy-drama, or "dramedy", emerging as a distinct television genre.

== Awards and nominations ==
Award	Year	Category	Nominee(s)	Result	Ref.
Directors Guild of America Awards	1986	Comedy Series	Peter Werner (for "The Dream Sequence Always Rings Twice")	Nominated	
Directors Guild of America Awards	1986	Dramatic Series	Will Mackenzie (for "My Fair David")	Won	
Directors Guild of America Awards	1987	Comedy Series	Paul Lynch (for "Symphony in Knocked Flat")	Nominated	
Directors Guild of America Awards	1987	Dramatic Series	Will Mackenzie (for "Atomic Shakespeare")	Won	
Golden Globe Awards	1986	Best Television Series – Musical or Comedy	Moonlighting	Nominated	
Golden Globe Awards	1986	Best Actress in a Television Series – Musical or Comedy	Cybill Shepherd	Won (Note: Tied with Estelle Getty for The Golden Girls)	
Golden Globe Awards	1986	Best Actor in a Television Series – Musical or Comedy	Bruce Willis	Nominated	
Golden Globe Awards	1987	Best Television Series – Musical or Comedy	Moonlighting	Nominated	
Golden Globe Awards	1987	Best Actress in a Television Series – Musical or Comedy	Cybill Shepherd	Won	
Golden Globe Awards	1987	Best Actor in a Television Series – Musical or Comedy	Bruce Willis	Won	
Golden Globe Awards	1988	Best Television Series – Musical or Comedy	Moonlighting	Nominated	
Golden Globe Awards	1988	Best Actress in a Television Series – Musical or Comedy	Cybill Shepherd	Nominated	
Golden Globe Awards	1988	Best Actor in a Television Series – Musical or Comedy	Bruce Willis	Nominated	
Golden Globe Awards	1988	Best Supporting Actress in a Series, Miniseries or Motion Picture Made for Television	Allyce Beasley	Nominated	
People's Choice Awards	1986	Favorite Female Performer in a New TV Program	Cybill Shepherd	Won	
People's Choice Awards	1986	Favorite Male Performer in a New TV Program	Bruce Willis	Won	
People's Choice Awards	1987	Favorite Female TV Performer	Cybill Shepherd	Won	
People's Choice Awards	1987	Favorite All-Around Female Entertainer	Cybill Shepherd	Won	
People's Choice Awards	1988	Favorite Female TV Performer	Cybill Shepherd	Won	
Primetime Emmy Awards	1985	Outstanding Directing for a Comedy Series	Robert Butler (for the pilot)	Nominated	
Primetime Emmy Awards	1986	Outstanding Drama Series	Moonlighting	Nominated	
Primetime Emmy Awards	1986	Outstanding Lead Actor in a Drama Series	Bruce Willis	Nominated	
Primetime Emmy Awards	1986	Outstanding Lead Actress in a Drama Series	Cybill Shepherd	Nominated	
Primetime Emmy Awards	1986	Outstanding Supporting Actress in a Drama Series	Allyce Beasley	Nominated	
Primetime Emmy Awards	1986	Outstanding Directing for a Drama Series	Will Mackenzie (for "My Fair David")	Nominated	
Primetime Emmy Awards	1986	Outstanding Directing for a Drama Series	Peter Werner (for "The Dream Sequence Always Rings Twice")	Nominated	
Primetime Emmy Awards	1986	Outstanding Writing for a Drama Series	Glenn Gordon Caron (for "Twas the Episode Before Christmas")	Nominated	
Primetime Emmy Awards	1986	Outstanding Writing for a Drama Series	Debra Frank and Carl Sautter (for "The Dream Sequence Always Rings Twice")	Nominated	
Primetime Emmy Awards	1987	Outstanding Drama Series	Moonlighting	Nominated	
Primetime Emmy Awards	1987	Outstanding Lead Actor in a Drama Series	Bruce Willis	Won	
Primetime Emmy Awards	1987	Outstanding Supporting Actress in a Drama Series	Allyce Beasley	Nominated	
Primetime Emmy Awards	1987	Outstanding Directing for a Drama Series	Allan Arkush (for "I Am Curious... Maddie")	Nominated	
Primetime Emmy Awards	1987	Outstanding Directing for a Drama Series	Will Mackenzie (for "Atomic Shakespeare")	Nominated	
Primetime Emmy Awards	1987	Outstanding Writing for a Drama Series	Glenn Gordon Caron, Roger Director, Charles H. Eglee, Karen Hall, Ron Osborn, and Jeff Reno (for "I Am Curious... Maddie")	Nominated	
Primetime Emmy Awards	1987	Outstanding Writing for a Drama Series	Ron Osborn and Jeff Reno (for "Atomic Shakespeare")	Nominated	
Primetime Creative Arts Emmy Awards	1985	Outstanding Achievement in Music and Lyrics	Lee Holdridge and Al Jarreau "(Moonlighting (Pilot): theme)".	Nominated	
Primetime Creative Arts Emmy Awards	1986	Outstanding Art Direction for a Series	James J. Agazzi and Bill Harp ("The Dream Sequence Always Rings Twice")	Nominated	
Primetime Creative Arts Emmy Awards	1986	Outstanding Cinematography for a Single-Camera Series	Gerald Perry Finnerman ("The Dream Sequence Always Rings Twice")	Nominated	
Primetime Creative Arts Emmy Awards	1986	Outstanding Costumes for a Series	Robert Turturice ("The Dream Sequence Always Rings Twice")	Nominated	
Primetime Creative Arts Emmy Awards	1986	Outstanding Guest Performer in a Drama Series	Whoopi Goldberg ("Camille")	Nominated	
Primetime Creative Arts Emmy Awards	1986	Outstanding Achievement in Hairstyling for a Series	Judy Crown and Josée Normand ("The Dream Sequence Always Rings Twice")	Nominated	
Primetime Creative Arts Emmy Awards	1986	Outstanding Music Composition for a Series	Alf Clausen ("The Dream Sequence Always Rings Twice")	Nominated	
Primetime Creative Arts Emmy Awards	1986	Outstanding Editing for a Series - Single Camera Production	Roger Bondelli ("Every Daughter's Father is a Virgin")	Nominated	
Primetime Creative Arts Emmy Awards	1986	Outstanding Editing for a Series - Single Camera Production	Neil Mandelberg ("The Dream Sequence Always Rings Twice")	Won	
Primetime Creative Arts Emmy Awards	1987	Outstanding Art Direction for a Series	James J. Agazzi and Bill Harp ("Atomic Shakespeare")	Nominated	
Primetime Creative Arts Emmy Awards	1987	Outstanding Choreography	Bill Landrum and Jacqui Landrum ("Big Man on Mulberry Street")	Nominated	
Primetime Creative Arts Emmy Awards	1987	Outstanding Costumes for a Series	Robert Turturice ("Atomic Shakespeare")	Won	
Primetime Creative Arts Emmy Awards	1987	Outstanding Achievement in Hairstyling for a Series	Kathryn Blondell and Josée Normand ("Atomic Shakespeare")	Won	
Primetime Creative Arts Emmy Awards	1987	Outstanding Music Composition for a Series	Alf Clausen ("Atomic Shakespeare")	Nominated	
Primetime Creative Arts Emmy Awards	1987	Outstanding Editing for a Series - Single Camera Production	Roger Bondelli and Neil Mandelberg ("Atomic Shakespeare")	Won	
Primetime Creative Arts Emmy Awards	1987	Outstanding Sound Mixing for a Drama Series	Martin Raymond Bolger, Dave Hudson, Mel Metcalf, and Terry Porter ("Atomic Shakespeare")	Nominated	
Primetime Creative Arts Emmy Awards	1988	Outstanding Art Direction for a Series	James J. Agazzi and Bill Harp ("Here's Living with You, Kid")	Nominated	
Primetime Creative Arts Emmy Awards	1988	Outstanding Cinematography for a Series	Gerald Perry Finnerman ("Here's Living with You, Kid")	Nominated	
Primetime Creative Arts Emmy Awards	1988	Outstanding Costumes for a Series	Robert Turturice ("Here's Living with You, Kid")	Nominated	
Primetime Creative Arts Emmy Awards	1988	Outstanding Guest Performer in a Drama Series	Imogene Coca (for "Los Dos DiPestos")	Nominated	
Primetime Creative Arts Emmy Awards	1988	Outstanding Music Composition for a Series	Alf Clausen (for "Here's Living with You, Kid")	Nominated	
Primetime Creative Arts Emmy Awards	1988	Outstanding Achievement in Music Direction	Alf Clausen, Brad Dechter, George Gaffney, Hummie Mann, and Don Nemitz (for "Cool Hand Dave: part 2")	Nominated	
Primetime Creative Arts Emmy Awards	1989	Outstanding Art Direction for a Series	James J. Agazzi and Bill Harp (for "A Womb with a View")	Won	
Primetime Creative Arts Emmy Awards	1989	Outstanding Achievement in Music Composition for a Series (Dramatic Underscore)	Alf Clausen (for "A Womb with a View")	Nominated	
Primetime Creative Arts Emmy Awards	1989	Outstanding Achievement in Music Direction	Alf Clausen, Hummie Mann, Brad Dechter, George Gaffney, and D'Vaughn Pershing (for "A Womb with a View")	Nominated	
