= Memento Mori (The X-Files) =

- The X-Files episode
- Episode no.: Season 4 Episode 14
- Directed by: Rob Bowman
- Written by: Chris Carter; Vince Gilligan; John Shiban; Frank Spotnitz
- Production code: 4X15
- Original air date: February 9, 1997
- Running time: 44 minutes

Guest appearances
- Mitch Pileggi as Walter Skinner; William B. Davis as Cigarette Smoking Man; Sheila Larken as Margaret Scully; David Lovgren as Kurt Crawford; Tom Braidwood as Melvin Frohike; Dean Haglund as Richard Langly; Bruce Harwood as John Fitzgerald Byers; Morris Panych as Gray-Haired Man; Julie Bond as Real Estate Woman; Sean Allen as Dr. Kevin Scanlon; Gillian Barber as Penny Northern

Episode chronology
← Previous "Never Again"	Next → "Kaddish"
- The X-Files season 4

"Memento Mori" is the fourteenth episode of the fourth season of the American science fiction television series The X-Files. It premiered on the Fox network on February 9, 1997. It was directed by Rob Bowman, and written by series creator Chris Carter, Vince Gilligan, John Shiban and Frank Spotnitz. "Memento Mori" featured guest appearances by Sheila Larken, David Lovgren and Morris Panych. The episode helped to explore the overarching mythology, or fictional history of The X-Files. "Memento Mori" earned a Nielsen household rating of 15.5, being watched by 19.1 million people in its initial broadcast. The title translates from Latin as "remember that you will die."

The show centers on FBI special agents Fox Mulder (David Duchovny) and Dana Scully (Gillian Anderson) who work on cases linked to the paranormal, called X-Files. When Scully is diagnosed with an inoperable nasopharyngeal tumor, Mulder attempts to discover what happened to her during her abduction experience, believing the two events to be related.

"Memento Mori" was written in only two days, when previous series writer Darin Morgan did not contribute a script for the season. Discussion between the writing staff led to the "obligatory" decision to have Scully diagnosed with cancer, although the decision was not unanimous. Guest actor Lovgren portrayed multiple clones of his character using post-production techniques to merge several shots, while actor Pat Skipper had a scene cut from the final episode for time restraints, later appearing in the season finale.

== Plot ==
Dana Scully (Gillian Anderson) learns that she has a cancerous tumor between her sinus and cerebrum. She initially tells only Fox Mulder (David Duchovny) and Walter Skinner (Mitch Pileggi) of the diagnosis, and is determined to continue to work. The agents head to Allentown, Pennsylvania, to see Betsy Hagopian, a Mutual UFO Network member who was previously discovered to be suffering from similar symptoms. The agents learn that Betsy has died, yet find someone using her phone line. They trace the call to Kurt Crawford (David Lovgren), a fellow MUFON member. Crawford tells them that all but one of the MUFON members Scully previously met have died of cancer. Scully is skeptical of Mulder and Crawford's claims that a government conspiracy and her abduction are behind her illness.

Scully visits the last surviving MUFON member, Penny Northern, who is being treated for cancer at a medical centre. Meanwhile, Mulder discovers that all the abductees were childless but had been treated at a nearby fertility clinic. When Mulder is called away by Scully, an assassin, the Gray-Haired Man (Morris Panych) arrives and kills Crawford with a stiletto weapon, revealing him to be an alien-human hybrid. After meeting Penny's physician, Dr. Scanlon, Scully elects to begin chemotherapy. Mulder sneaks into the clinic and finds Crawford there, seemingly alive. Mulder and "Crawford" hack into the clinic's computer database and find information revealing Scully has a file there. Mulder sees Skinner and asks to deal with The Smoking Man to save Scully, but Skinner convinces him not to do so.

Mulder recruits The Lone Gunmen to help him break into a high security research facility where he thinks he may be able to find more information on how to save Scully. Meanwhile, Skinner tries to deal directly with The Smoking Man for Scully's life, who tells him he will get back to him. Inside the facility, Mulder discovers that Dr. Scanlon works alongside several clones of Kurt Crawford. The clones show him Scully's harvested ova and tell him they are trying to save the abducted women's lives, since they acted as their birth mothers. They also hope to subvert the colonization project as an inside job. Mulder takes Scully's ova and leaves, being pursued by the Gray-Haired Man as he escapes. He returns to the hospital to see Scully, who tells him that Penny has died but that she intends to fight the disease. Afterward, Mulder phones Skinner to let him know that Scully is doing okay and may return to work soon, as well as thanking him for his advice about not negotiating with the Smoking Man. Skinner and the Smoking Man later come to terms on their deal in seclusion.

== Production ==
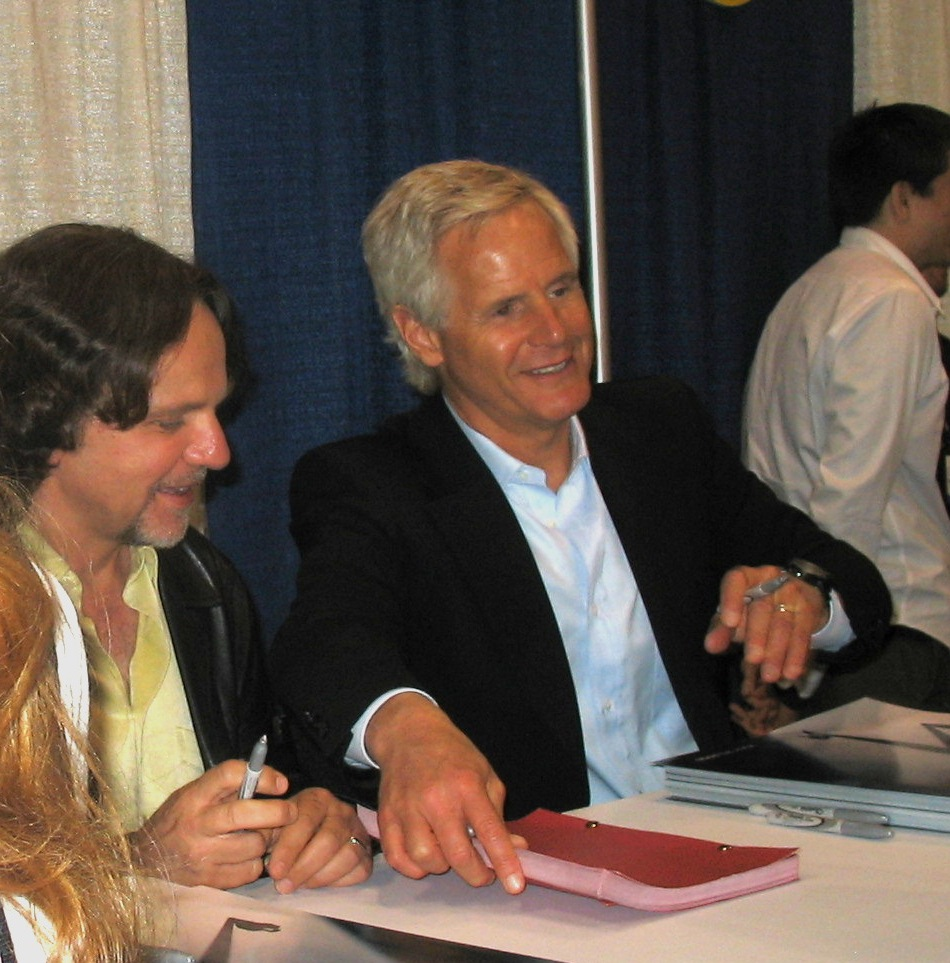
Writers Spotnitz (left) and Carter (right) had debated whether or not the character of Scully should be diagnosed with cancer, ultimately calling it "obligatory".

The show's producers decided to give Gillian Anderson's character Dana Scully cancer early in the fourth season. Series creator Chris Carter initially discussed giving Scully's mother cancer but decided to have Scully suffer from it instead. Carter felt the move would give the show an interesting platform on which to discuss things such as faith, science, health care and a certain element of the paranormal. Some of the writing staff felt that the decision was a poor one to make, citing it as "a cheap TV thing". However, Frank Spotnitz felt that, given the appearances of cancer-stricken abductees in previous episodes, it was an "obligatory" move to have Scully follow suit.

The episode was written by Vince Gilligan, John Shiban, and Frank Spotnitz three days after another script idea fell through. Spotnitz noted that "Darin Morgan had left the show but was going to contribute an episode. And we realized at the eleventh hour that it wasn't going to happen, and we were stuck with nothing. John, Vince and I broke that story in maybe two days. We split up the acts, wrote it in probably another two days, and gave the crew something to prep before Christmas break. That was the worst ever." Carter ended up rewriting the script over the holiday. The initial cut ended up being too long, resulting in a scene introducing Scully's older brother Bill Scully, played by Pat Skipper, being removed. The character, still played by Skipper, would eventually make his first appearance in the fourth-season finale "Gethsemane". The scene which would have established the character was intended to echo a similar scene in the second season episode "One Breath", which featured Don S. Davis as Scully's father. Both scenes featured the actors standing over a supine Scully, wearing white United States Navy dress uniforms. Also deleted from the episode was a kiss between Mulder and Scully, which would have been the first in the series' run. This was an ad-lib on Anderson and Duchovny's part, and was removed from the episode as it was something Chris Carter felt he wanted to make use of in the series' film adaptation. Such a kiss was eventually deferred to season six's "Triangle".

The episode's opening scene, featuring a camera moving slowly towards Scully in a harsh white light, was achieved by constructing a long narrow set covered in aluminium foil, which amplified the light being used and downplayed any colors. This shot was drained of color entirely, and was combined with a series of blurring and framing effects in post-production to further enhance the intended image—to create the impression of waking from a dream.

A scene featuring multiple clones of the character Kurt Crawford was achieved with motion control photography, allowing actor David Lovgren to portray all of the clones—multiple takes were recorded with the actor in different positions within the scene, and by using a camera controlled by a computer to follow exactly the same motions for each take, these could be seamlessly composited together. Producer Paul Rabwin has noted that achieving these shots was difficult due to the mixture of green and blue light sources in the scene.

== Broadcast and reception ==
"Memento Mori" premiered on the Fox network on February 9, 1997. The episode earned a Nielsen household rating of 11.5 with a 17 share, meaning that roughly 11.5 percent of all television-equipped households, and 17 percent of households watching television, were tuned in to the episode. A total of 19.10 million viewers watched this episode during its original airing.

Writing for The A.V. Club, Emily VanDerWerff rated the episode an A, calling it "an occasionally beautiful, occasionally haunting, often overwritten story". She felt that the episode took the uncommon route of tying together several previously mentioned aspects of the series' mythology, making it "easy to believe the pieces might come together at this point". However, VanDerWerff also noted that the episode's two main plot threads—Scully's cancer and Mulder's investigation—seemed "clumsily grafted" together, and did not explore the theme of living with the fear of death as well as the previous episode, "Never Again", had done. Frank Spotnitz praised the episode, saying, "I think that was the best mythology episode we ever did. It's my favorite one". Chris Carter has stated that he feels "Memento Mori" ranks "among the best mythology episodes of all nine seasons".

This episode was submitted to the Academy of Television Arts & Sciences to represent The X-Files in that year's Primetime Emmy Awards. Episode writers Chris Carter, Vince Gilligan, John Shiban, and Frank Spotnitz were nominated for a Primetime Emmy Award for Outstanding Writing for a Drama Series. Art directors Graeme Murray and Gary Allen and set decorator Shirley Inget won the Creative Emmy Award for Best Art Direction in a Series, while actress Gillian Anderson also won the Primetime Emmy Award for Outstanding Lead Actress in a Drama Series for her work in this episode and the fourth season as a whole.

== Bibliography ==
- Hurwitz, Matt; Knowles, Chris (2008). The Complete X-Files. Insight Editions. ISBN 978-1-933784-80-9.
- Meisler, Andy (1998). I Want to Believe: The Official Guide to the X-Files. Harper Prism. ISBN 0-06-105386-4.
