= Frank Grieco =

American art director

- Born: Frank Grieco Jr.
- Occupation: Art director
- Years active: 1976–2018

Frank Grieco Jr. is an American art director. He won a Primetime Emmy Award in the category Outstanding Art Direction for his work on the television program Tales of the Gold Monkey. His win was shared with John W. Corso and Robert George Freer.
