= Wesley Laws =

American set decorator

- Born: Maurice Wesley Laws; September 27, 1925; Ferndale, Michigan, U.S.
- Died: March 14, 2016 (aged 90)
- Occupation: Set decorator
- Years active: 1954–1988

Maurice Wesley Laws (September 27, 1925 – March 14, 2016) was an American set decorator. He won a Primetime Emmy Award and was nominated for another one in the category Outstanding Art Direction for his work on the television programs Beacon Hill and Man on the Moon: The Epic Journey of Apollo XI.

Laws died on March 14, 2016, at the age of 90.
