= Fred R. Price =

American art director and set decorator

- Born: 1927; United States
- Died: June 25, 2015 (aged 87–88); Sherman Oaks, California, U.S.
- Occupations: Art director, set decorator
- Spouse: Sonia Price
- Children: 2

Fred R. Price (1927 – June 25, 2015) was an American art director and set decorator. He was nominated for two Primetime Emmy Awards in the category Outstanding Art Direction for his work on the television program Mannix.

Price died on June 25, 2015 in Sherman Oaks, California, at the age of 88. He was buried in Eden Memorial Park Cemetery.
