= Greg Loewen =

Canadian art director

- Born: Gregory Loewen
- Occupation: Art director
- Years active: 1994–2001

Gregory Loewen is a Canadian art director. He won a Primetime Emmy Award in the category Outstanding Art Direction for his work on the television program The X-Files. His win was shared with Graeme Murray and Shirley Inget.
