= Robert Lacey Jr. =

American set decorator

- Occupation: Set decorator
- Years active: 1984–1989

Robert Lacey Jr. is an American set decorator. He won a Primetime Emmy Award in the category Outstanding Art Direction for his work on the television program Miami Vice. His win was shared with Jeffrey Howard.
