= Tales of the Gold Monkey =

American television series

- Jake and Sarah in Tales of the Gold Monkey
- Genre: Adventure
- Created by: Donald P. Bellisario
- Starring: Stephen Collins; Jeff MacKay; Caitlin O'Heaney; John Calvin; Roddy McDowall
- Theme music composer: Mike Post & Pete Carpenter
- Composer: Frank Denson
- Country of origin: United States
- Original language: English
- No. of seasons: 1
- No. of episodes: 22

Production
- Production companies: Belisarius Productions; Universal Television

Original release
- Network: ABC
- Release: September 22, 1982 – June 1, 1983

Tales of the Gold Monkey is an American adventure drama television series broadcast in prime time on Wednesday nights by ABC from September 22, 1982, to June 1, 1983. Debuting the year following the release of Raiders of the Lost Ark, the series featured early aviation, indigenous locals, and cliff-hanging action. Creator Don Bellisario said it was based on the 1939 Howard Hawks film Only Angels Have Wings.

== Premise and major characters ==
Set in 1938 in the South Pacific, the series is about an ex-Flying Tigers fighter pilot named Jake Cutter (Stephen Collins). Now the operator of an air cargo delivery service based on the fictional South Seas island Bora Gora, he flies a red and white Grumman Goose called Cutter's Goose. Jake's best friend is his mechanic Corky (Jeff MacKay), a good-hearted alcoholic with a hazy memory from heavy drinking. However, a one-eyed Jack Russell Terrier named Jack, which barks once for "no" and twice for "yes" (or the opposite if it suits him) would dispute just who Jake's best friend really is. Jack wears an eye patch, but used to have a false eye made of opal with a star sapphire centre that Jake lost in a poker game—and refuses to let Jake forget it.

Jake's love interest and U.S. government spy contact is Sarah Stickney White (Caitlin O'Heaney). She sings in the Monkey Bar as a cover for her espionage activities. The Reverend Willie Tenboom (John Calvin), a phony man of the cloth who likes to "bless" the female natives in private "prayer", is in reality a Nazi spy named Willy, with interests in both sides.

"Bon Chance" Louie (played by Ron Moody in the pilot, Roddy McDowall in the series) is the owner of the Monkey Bar and the French magistrate for Bora Gora. Jake's nemesis is the Japanese princess Koji (Marta DuBois), a Dragon Lady type of character who has eyes for Jake. Koji's devoted bodyguard is Todo (John Fujioka), a fierce practitioner of Bushido and loyal to the princess. (Although Calvin, DuBois, and Fujioka were billed on the opening credits of each episode, they actually only appeared on a semi-regular basis in a handful of episodes.)

The title is derived from a gigantic mythical golden statue that is the focal point of the pilot episode, seen only by the viewer at the end of the show. The characters end their search for the statue after finding a substitute brass monkey that is kept at the Monkey Bar for the rest of the series.

== History and context ==
Originally, the series was to be called Tales of the Brass Monkey, but the Heublein company had run a series of magazine ads with exactly that name about a bar in the Far East, with hints of Casablanca intrigue and references to the Kempeitai; so, to avoid legal difficulties, the name was changed to Gold Monkey. At the end of the pilot episode, it is revealed that the statue at the bar was actually brass and not gold. However, unknown to the characters (and revealed to viewers only just before the end credits), the island where the statue was found does contain a massive structure apparently made of solid gold that does resemble a monkey. However, a thousand years of neglect had left it covered in vegetation and debris, and it is only exposed by the same volcanic eruption that forces the characters off the island.

As with most of creator Donald P. Bellisario's projects, links exist to his other shows including the character Gandy Dancer (played by William Lucking), an ace pilot treasure hunter who appears in the episodes "Legends Are Forever" and – in flashback form – in "Honor Thy Brother". Although Gandy dies in "Legends Are Forever", Bellisario liked the character enough to adapt him to the present day. The third-season episode "Two Birds of a Feather" of Bellisario's hit Magnum, P.I., has Lucking playing the very similar character of Sam Houston Hunter, also an ace pilot. The episode, which noticeably has little appearance of Magnum or any other regular characters, acted as a backdoor pilot for a proposed spin-off series starring Lucking. However, the series was never picked up, although Bellisario stripped down the "adventures of an ace pilot" concept and worked it into Airwolf (1984–1986).

Jeff MacKay had recurring roles in Magnum, P.I., and later JAG (1995–2005), and Marta DuBois played the role of Magnum's estranged wife Michelle, long-presumed dead, in a story arc that spanned most of that show's run. MacKay and Calvin both went on to play several guest roles in Airwolf; and McDowall, MacKay, Calvin (and stock footage of the Goose) all went on to have guest appearances on the Bellisario series Quantum Leap (1989–1993). Stock footage of the Goose was also used in The A-Team episode "The Island" (season three, episode eight) and in Quantum Leap Episode "Ghost Ship" (season four, episode 16). Additionally, Jake's surname, Cutter, was previously an early working title and character name for that of Magnum, and Bellisario later reused the name "Gushie", who in Gold Monkey was a waiter at the Monkey Bar who used a wheelchair, for a member of the Quantum Leap project team.

Although generally well-received in both the United States and overseas (such as the United Kingdom, where it was broadcast on BBC One on Monday evenings), the show was not renewed for another season, mostly due to the ratings not justifying the high cost of production.

This show was an inspiration for the Disney animated series TaleSpin, according to series creators Jymn Magon and Mark Zaslove. It also heavily inspired the ninth season of the animated series Archer, "Danger Island".

A fictional recursion occurs in "The Sultan of Swat" in which – while waiting for the Boeing 314 Pan Am Clipper – Jake is reading a book with a dustcover titled Murder on the Footbridge, which is apparently a key plot reference from the 1941 Alfred Hitchcock movie Suspicion.

== Episodes ==
No.	Title	Directed by	Written by	Original release date
1	"Tales of the Gold Monkey: Episode 1"	Ray Austin	Donald P. Bellisario	September 22, 1982
Part one of the series pilot: American pilot Jake Cutter contends with German spies, vicious monkeys and a sassy government agent.
2	"Tales of the Gold Monkey: Episode 2"	Ray Austin	Donald P. Bellisario	September 22, 1982
Part two of the pilot. American pilot Jake Cutter contends with German spies, vicious monkeys and a sassy government agent.
3	"Shanghaied"	Alan J. Levi	Donald P. Bellisario	September 29, 1982
Jake struggles to rescue Corky from the clutches of a one-armed captain of a slave ship.
4	"Black Pearl"	Victor Lobl	Dennis Capps and George Geiger & Bob Foster & Paul Savage & Donald P. Bellisario	October 13, 1982
Jake poses as a defecting American scientist to investigate a top-secret German military experiment.
5	"Legends Are Forever"	Virgil Vogel	Story by : Milt Rosen; Teleplay by : Milt Rosen and Reuben Leder and Donald P. Bellisario	October 20, 1982
An old friend with dubious motives talks Jake into transporting supplies to a malaria-stricken African tribe.
6	"Escape from Death Island"	James Frawley	Peter Elliot & Stephen Katz	October 27, 1982
Jake and Corky fly an Englishman to an island prison colony, where the man's son is being mistreated for leading an escape attempt.
7	"Trunk from the Past"	Christian I. Nyby II	John Pashdag & Brady Westwater	November 3, 1982
Jake believes that a blood-stained trunk holds the key to Sarah's murdered father's search for a pharaoh's tomb.
8	"Once a Tiger..."	Winrich Kolbe	L. Ford Neal & John Huff	November 17, 1982
Jake helps search for a downed aircraft transporting military weapons the Japanese also want.
9	"Honor Thy Brother"	Mike Vejar	Story by : Jeff Ray & Danny Lee Cole; Teleplay by : Jeff Ray & Danny Lee Cole and Bill Driskill and George Geiger	November 24, 1982
Jake embarks on a mission to help Corky out of an arranged marriage. Jack gets his glass eye back, briefly.
10	"The Lady and the Tiger"	Virgil Vogel	Donald P. Bellisario	December 8, 1982
Jake crash-lands on an island, where he's aided by a widow and her young son, who's bent on killing a tiger.
11	"The Late Sarah White"	Harvey Laidman	Maryanne Kasica & Michael Scheff and Donald P. Bellisario & George Geiger	December 22, 1982
Jake heads for the Philippines after Sarah is reported to have died on a secret mission there.
12	"The Sultan of Swat"	Virgil Vogel	David Brown	January 5, 1983
Jake's friend lands in Boragora and is soon accused of having raped and murdered an island girl.
13	"Ape Boy"	Winrich Kolbe	Story by : Eric Lerner and Bill Driskill; Teleplay by : Andrew Schneider and Bill Driskill	January 12, 1983
Jake, Sarah and Corky find an ape boy who's sought by an Englishman and two hunters for a circus freak show.
14	"God Save the Queen"	Virgil Vogel	George Geiger	January 19, 1983
A British lord threatens to blow up a stranded luxury liner carrying the Duke of Windsor, unless the duke hands over the royal jewels.
15	"High Stakes Lady"	James Frawley	Story by : Lance Madrid III and Bill Driskill; Teleplay by : Bill Driskill	January 26, 1983
Jake becomes involved in espionage when he accompanies a card shark to a high-stakes poker game.
16	"Force of Habit"	Harvey S. Laidman	Story by : Tom Greene and William Schmidt; Teleplay by : Tom Greene	February 2, 1983
On Boragora, Jake recognises a woman---now donning a nun's habit---who claims she's delivering cholera vaccine to China.
17	"Cooked Goose"	Donald A. Baer	Jay Huguely	March 4, 1983
While honeymooning on an island, a clipper pilot is beaten and his bride abducted by mercenaries.
18	"Last Chance Louie"	James Fargo	Story by : Bob Shayne; Teleplay by : Tom Greene & George Geiger	March 11, 1983
Louie is sentenced to the guillotine for the murder of a French army deserter, and Jake's only hope of saving him is a story that Louie wants to remain a secret.
19	"Naka Jima Kill"	Jack Whitman	Story by : Thom Thomas and Andrew Schneider; Teleplay by : Andrew Schneider and Tom Greene	March 18, 1983
A newshound covering an assassination attempt against the Japanese defence minister tricks Jake into flying her to Princess Koji's island.
20	"Boragora or Bust"	Ivan Dixon	George Geiger & Tom Greene	March 25, 1983
Jake's prospector friend could lose his platinum mine to a claim-jumper from the States.
21	"A Distant Shout of Thunder"	James Fargo	Tom Greene & George Geiger	April 8, 1983
Sarah is used as a scapegoat by a revolutionary, who accuses her of removing a statue from sacred ground in the Marivellas.
22	"Mourning Becomes Matuka"	David Jones	Story by : Jay Huguely; Teleplay by : Jay Huguely and Tom Greene & George Geiger	June 1, 1983
After learning of a plot to assassinate her, Princess Koji asks Jake to determine which guest at her birthday party is vying for her empire.

== Home media ==
Fabulous Films obtained the DVD rights for the complete series for the United Kingdom, Australia and the United States. Release dates are listed below. Shout! Factory released Tales of the Gold Monkey: The Complete Series on Region 1 DVD on June 8, 2010.

Region 2/4 (UK)	November 16, 2009
Region 2/4 (Australia)	November 27, 2009
Region 1 (US)	June 8, 2010

All three DVD sets include the same bonus features: original double-length pilot episode; the complete 20-episode series; new 36-minute 'making of' documentary with Stephen Collins (Jake Cutter), Caitlin O'Heaney (Sarah Stickney White), writer/producer Tom Greene, director Harvey Laidman; audio commentaries on five episodes; series synopsis; stills gallery; Caitlin's Original Costume gallery; artifacts gallery; 24-page collector's booklet with episode synopses. The Region 1 and 2 versions have a dedication to "the memory of the late, great Jeff MacKay" printed on the back cover.

== Reception ==
=== Ratings ===
U.S. television ratings for Tales of the Gold Monkey
Season	Episodes	Start date	End date	Nielsen rank	Nielsen rating
1982–83	21	September 22, 1982	June 1, 1983	69	N/A

=== Awards and nominations ===
Awards and nominations for Tales of the Gold Monkey
Year	Award	Category	Recipient(s)	Result
1983	Primetime Emmy Awards	Outstanding Art Direction for a Series	John W. Corso (production designer), Frank Grieco (art director), Robert George Freer (set decorator)	Won
1983	Primetime Emmy Awards	Outstanding Costume Design for a Series	Jean-Pierre Dorleac	Nominated
1983	Primetime Emmy Awards	Outstanding Film Sound Editing for a Series	Sam Shaw (supervising editor), Bernard P. Cabral, John Detra, Sam Gemette, Donlee Jorgensen, Mark Roberts (sound editor)|Mark Roberts, Erik Schrader, John Stacy, Bob Weatherford, Paul Wittenberg, William Shenberg	Nominated
1983	Primetime Emmy Awards	Outstanding Film Sound Mixing for a Series	John Kean (production mixer), Michael Casper, Stanley H. Polinsky, B. Tennyson Sebastian II (rerecording mixers)	Nominated

== Other media ==
A television annual was published in the UK by Grandreams Ltd in 1982. It included text and comic stories based on the show. Comic stories based on the show also ran in TV Comic from issue #1656, Sept 1983 to #1697 Jun. 29, 1984, as well as the 1984 holiday special and 1985 annual.

In season 2, episode 8 of The Venture Bros., henchman 21 use the names Jake Cutter and Corky Knightrider on fake IDs for himself and henchman 24.

G. P. Putnam's Sons published a children's storybook in 1983.
