= Richard D. Kent =

American set decorator

- Occupation: Set decorator
- Years active: 1975–1988

Richard D. Kent is an American set decorator. He won a Primetime Emmy Award in the category Outstanding Art Direction for his work on the television program L.A. Law. His win was shared with Jeffrey L. Goldstein.
