= Thomas John =

Thomas John may refer to:

- Tommy John (1943–2026), American professional baseball pitcher
- Tom John (born 1995), Welsh footballer
- Thomas John (medium) (21st century), American psychic medium
- Tom H. John (1931–2026), American art director, production designer and set designer

== See also ==
- Tommy Johns (1851–1927), American baseball player
- Tommy John surgery
