= Bill Harp =

American set decorator

- Born: Rufus William Harp; November 28, 1923; Bastrop, Louisiana, U.S.
- Died: March 16, 1994 (aged 70); Hollywood, California, U.S.
- Education: Louisiana State University
- Occupation: Set decorator

Rufus William Harp (November 28, 1923 – March 16, 1994) was an American set decorator. He won three Primetime Emmy Awards and was nominated for fourteen more in the category Outstanding Art Direction for his work on the television programs My Name Is Barbra, The Carol Burnett Show, Studs Lonigan, Casablanca, Moonlighting, and the television films Marilyn: The Untold Story and Invitation to Hell.

Harp died on March 16, 1994 of a heart attack in Hollywood, California, at the age of 70.
