= Joseph Stone (set decorator) =

American set decorator

- Born: Joseph John Epstein; August 8, 1919; New York, U.S.
- Died: October 19, 1994 (aged 75); Riverside, California, U.S.
- Occupation: Set decorator
- Years active: 1965–1988

Joseph John Epstein (August 8, 1919 – October 19, 1994) was an American set decorator. He won a Primetime Emmy Award and was nominated for four more in the category Outstanding Art Direction for his work on the television programs Rich Man, Poor Man, Centennial, Masada and Fame.

Stone died on October 19, 1994, in Riverside, California, at the age of 75.
