= Gary Allen (disambiguation) =

Gary Allen (1936–1986) was an American conservative writer.

Gary Allen may also refer to:

- Gary Allen (gridiron football) (1960–2023), American football player
- Gary Allen (runner) (born 1957), American long-distance runner,
- Gary Allen (cricketer) (1945–2022), New Zealand cricketer
- Gary Allen (art director) (1936–2018), American-Canadian art director
- Gary Arthur Allen (born 1973), British convicted murderer, see Gary Allen case

== See also ==
- Gary Allan (born 1967), American country music singer.
- Gary Allan (speedway rider) (born 1967), British-born speedway rider from New Zealand
