= Richard Kent =

Richard Kent may refer to:

- Richard Kent (cricketer), South African cricketer
- Richard D. Kent, American set decorator
- Richard W. Kent American businessman and baseball team proprietor
