= Warren Clymer =

American art director, production designer and set decorator

- Born: Warren Edward Clymer; December 29, 1922; Davenport, Iowa, U.S.
- Died: July 16, 2007 (aged 84); Manhattan, New York, U.S.
- Education: University of Iowa; Indiana University Bloomington
- Occupations: Art director, production designer, set decorator
- Spouse: Gail Clymer
- Children: 3

Warren Edward Clymer (December 29, 1922 – July 16, 2007) was an American art director, production designer and set decorator. He won two Primetime Emmy Awards and was nominated for five more in the category Outstanding Art Direction for his work on the television programs Frontiers of Faith and Hallmark Hall of Fame.

Clymer died on July 16, 2007, in Manhattan, New York, at the age of 84.
