= Richard B. Lewis (production designer) =

American art director and production designer

- Occupations: Art director, production designer
- Years active: 1979–2007

Richard B. Lewis is an American art director and production designer. He won a Primetime Emmy Award in the category Outstanding Art Direction for his work on the television program Max Headroom. His win was shared with Bernard P. Cutler and Leslie McCarthy-Frankenheimer.
