= The Brink's Job =

1978 film by William Friedkin

- Theatrical release poster
- Directed by: William Friedkin
- Screenplay by: Walon Green
- Based on: Big Stick-Up at Brinks by Noel Behn
- Produced by: Ralph Serpe
- Starring: Peter Falk; Peter Boyle; Allen Garfield; Warren Oates; Gena Rowlands; Paul Sorvino
- Cinematography: Norman Leigh
- Edited by: Robert K. Lambert; Bud S. Smith
- Music by: Richard Rodney Bennett
- Distributed by: Universal Pictures
- Release date: December 8, 1978
- Running time: 104 minutes
- Language: English
- Budget: $16.4 million
- Box office: $14.5 million (rentals)

The Brink's Job is a 1978 American crime comedy drama film directed by William Friedkin and starring Peter Falk, Peter Boyle, Allen Garfield, Warren Oates, Gena Rowlands, and Paul Sorvino. It is based on the Brink's robbery of 1950 in Boston, and the book about it, Big Stick-Up at Brinks by Noel Behn. Robbers stole $2.7 million in cash, checks, and government securities.

The film was nominated for an Oscar for Best Art Direction (Dean Tavoularis, Angelo P. Graham, Bruce Kay and George R. Nelson).

The film uses facts (and participant names) from the case, although several actual details are omitted in order to tell a compact story.

== Plot ==
Small-time Boston crook Tony Pino tries to make a name for himself. He and his five associates pull off a robbery whenever they can. Tony stumbles across the fact that the Brink's security procedures are incredibly lax. He and his gang easily rob over $100,000 in cash from a parked Brink's armored car. To find out more, Tony disguises himself as a spark plug salesman to get an inside look at Brink's large and so-called "impregnable fortress" headquarters in the North End of Boston. The company had been thought to have unbreachable security as a private "bank" throughout the East Coast.

Once inside, Tony realizes that Brink's is anything but a fortress and that employees treat the money "like garbage." Still wary of Brink's public image, Tony breaks in one night after casing the building. He finds that only two doors in the building are locked, and one is easily bypassed by leaping a gate. The only thing locked in the building is the vault.

Tony also realizes that despite what Brink's claims, there is only a 10-cent alarm in the vault room itself, almost impossible to set off. It appears that Brink's had relied so much on its reputation that it had not even bothered locking the doors. Pino begins to plan a robbery, using the rooftop of a neighboring building as an observation platform.

Tony and his dim brother-in-law Vinnie put together a motley gang of thieves. They include the debonair Jazz Maffie and an Iwo Jima veteran, Specs O'Keefe, who is taken on before they realize how unbalanced he is. Over the crew's objections, Pino also invites arrogant fence/liquor store owner Joe McGinnis to be in on the job.

During the evening of 17 January 1950, the gang make off with over 1.2 million dollars in cash, along with another 1.5 million in securities and checks. Brink's, a company that prides itself in the safekeeping of money, is nationally embarrassed by what the press is calling "the crime of the century." Even FBI director J. Edgar Hoover takes a personal interest in finding the culprits, even creating a temporary FBI office in Boston to address the crime.

Law enforcement agents begin rounding up suspects. They come to the home of Tony and Mary Pino, as they often do for crimes in the area. Mary is so familiar with them by now, she makes the cops dinner. Tony is brought in for questioning, but reacts with indignation at being accused.

The crooks begin to crack, however. McGinnis infuriates them by claiming to have destroyed 50K of the money, claiming the bills could be traced. He also hangs onto the rest, defying threats by Pino and the others to hand over their shares.

Specs and another of the gang, Stanley Gusciora, go on the road to meet his "sugar doughnut" in Pittsburgh. They are picked up by Pennsylvania State Police on a burglary charge en route at Bradford, Pennsylvania and are each handed a long jail sentence, Gusciora at the Western Penitentiary-Pittsburgh. Specs grows more and more disturbed behind bars, demanding that money from his cut be sent to his ill sister. In interrogation, Specs and Stanley are pressured more each day to reveal whatever they might know about the Brink's job. Specs ultimately confesses.

One by one, the rest of the gang is apprehended, mainly by the Boston Police Department. Tony is on his way to jail in Boston and so is Vinnie, but they unexpectedly find themselves hailed as heroes by people on the street for having pulled off one of the great crimes of all time.

== Cast ==
- Peter Falk as Tony Pino
- Peter Boyle as Joe McGinnis
- Allen Garfield as Vinnie Costa (as Allen Goorwitz)
- Warren Oates as Specs O'Keefe
- Gena Rowlands as Mary Pino
- Paul Sorvino as Jazz Maffie
- Sheldon Leonard as J. Edgar Hoover
- Gerard Murphy as Sandy Richardson
- Kevin O'Connor as Stanley Gusciora
- Claudia Peluso as Gladys
- Patrick Hines as H. H. Rightmire
- Malachy McCourt as Mutt Murphy
- Walter Klavun as Daniels
- Randy Jurgensen as FBI agent
- John Brandon as FBI agent
- Robert Prosky as Lineup Gallery Cop

== Production ==
The film was developed by director John Frankenheimer who then lost interest in it. Dino De Laurentiis then offered the project to William Friedkin who was looking for something to do after a proposed adaptation of Born on the Fourth of July with Al Pacino had been unable to secure finance. A script had been written but Friedkin insisted on rewriting it with Walon Green, who had just written Sorcerer for the director.

During the production, a number of conflicts and concerns with Teamsters Union members occurred, ultimately resulting in four indictments and two convictions of Teamsters for attempts to solicit non-existent jobs.

== Filming locations ==
The movie was filmed primarily on location in Boston. Locations included:

- The parking garage on Prince Street in the North End and the former Brinks Headquarters, where the Brink's robbery actually took place;
- The old Boston Police Headquarters on Berkeley Street (since renovated as the Loews Boston Hotel);
- Copp's Hill Terrace in the North End.
- An alley in the opening sequence reveals the Pilgrim Theatre (since demolished) in what was then Boston's Combat Zone, an infamous Red-light district
- Gumball factory 'Colley Confectionery Co'-exterior scenes on 150 Orleans and Gove Street in East Boston (now renovated into residences). The rail lines in the film that were behind the building are gone, now the East Boston Greenway.
- Another shot in that sequence shows the faded sign painted on the side of the Combat Zone's Gaiety Theatre (also since demolished).
- Tony and Joe fight in Roxbury's Dudley Square station (partially demolished since).
- The New England Mutual Life Insurance Company building on Boylston Street in the Back Bay was used as the Boston Courthouse.
- The Old North Church is visible in several shots.
- The Custom House Tower in Downtown Boston is seen one of the rooftop scenes, and its base was used as the Suffolk County Courthouse in the film's final indictment sequence.
- The Traffic Box scene where Specs O'Keefe drives through Towanda, PA was filmed in Stoneham, Massachusetts
- Doyle's Cafe - Jamaica Plain

== Reception ==
Reviewing the film in the Chicago Sun-Times, Roger Ebert wrote, "The movie was directed by William Friedkin, best known for the violence and shock of The Exorcist, The French Connection, and Sorcerer. What he exhibits here, though, is a light touch, an ability to orchestrate rich human humor with a bunch of characters who look like they were born to stand in a police lineup. Falk, playing Pino, has never been better in a movie. He gives the guy a nice, offbeat edge; Pino is a natural hustler looking for the angle in everything. ... Friedkin has great control of tone. He gives us characters who are comic and yet seem realistic enough that we share their feelings, and he gives us a movie that's funny and yet functions smoothly as a thriller. This sort of craft is sometimes hard to appreciate - The Brink's Job is so well put together that it doesn't draw attention to its direction. ... And the acting is great to savor. The characters are richly detailed, complicated, given dialog that's written with almost musical cadences."

The movie was nominated for the Best Art Direction Academy Award (Dean Tavoularis, Angelo P. Graham, George R. Nelson, and Bruce Kay).

Friedkin later said the film "has some nice moments, despite thinly drawn characters, but it left no footprint. There's little intensity or suspense and the humour is an acquired taste. The film doesn't shout, it doesn't sing - it barely whispers". He considers The Brink's Job to be his movie that ended up the "farthest" from what he had envisioned.

On the review aggregator website Rotten Tomatoes, 70% of 10 critics' reviews are positive.

== Heist ==
In August 1978, 15 unedited reels of the film were stolen at gunpoint. While the robbers demanded a $1 million ransom, the money was never paid because the robbers, showing a distinct lack of filmmaking knowledge, had hijacked outtakes and dailies. Positive prints of negatives were being held by the Technicolor Company in New York City, so the material was replaced with no significant delay. The robbers, however, made a ransom call, which triggered an investigation by the FBI. During the ransom call, Friedkin told the robbers to "get a projector and enjoy the film; it was all theirs."
