= Jim Mees =

American set designer (born 1955)

- Born: August 10, 1955; Mahopac, New York, US
- Died: March 29, 2013 (aged 57); Selinsgrove, Pennsylvania, US
- Education: Bachelor's degree
- Alma mater: Carnegie Mellon University
- Occupation: Set designer
- Known for: Star Trek
- Partner: Dr. Michael Smyth
- Awards: Emmy Award for Outstanding Art Direction for a Series (1990)

Jim Mees (August 10, 1955 – March 29, 2013), was an American set designer who worked on a variety of television series as well as music tours and films. He was awarded an Emmy Award for Outstanding Art Direction for a Series in 1990 for his work on the Star Trek: The Next Generation episode "Sins of the Father", and was nominated on four other occasions.

== Biography ==
Mees was born in Mahopac, New York on August 10, 1955. He became friends with designer Vera Neumann, whom he later credited as being the inspiration behind his design career. He first met her at the age of 12 and later gained a job with her, drawing images which were turned into designs for clothing. He gained a bachelor's degree in theatre and lighting design from Carnegie Mellon University in 1977. During his final year, he was selected by the Seattle Repertory Theater to work on George Abbott's final Broadway production Music Is.

After graduation, he moved to Los Angeles to pursue a career in design. In 1982, he gained his first job on a television series with the CBS series Gloria. He went on to work with a dozen more television series including three Star Trek series, The Next Generation, Voyager and Enterprise. Patrick Stewart said of Mees' 14 years working on the Star Trek franchise, "He made you feel hopeful about the future because you could see that good taste was still present in features of design 400 years from now and hadn't been completely overwhelmed by technology." Mees complained of Ronald D. Moore writing scenes in which characters would pull open wall panels on the Enterprise: because the Enterprise was a stage set instead of a real ship, anything shown behind a panel would have to be designed and built separately. As a result of these complaints, these removable panels were subsequently referred to in scripts as "Mees panels".

Outside of Star Trek, he also worked on shows such as Who's the Boss?, Gilmore Girls, Cold Case and Bones. Mees also created the stage designs for music artists such as Diana Ross and The Beach Boys. He worked on two films, Second Serve and Maniac.

Mees was awarded an Emmy Award for Outstanding Art Direction for a Series, alongside Richard D. James, in 1990 for The Next Generation episode "Sins of the Father". He was nominated on four other occasions, in 1989 for "Elementary, Dear Data", in 1991 for "The Best of Both Worlds", in 1992 for "Unification" and in 1994 for "Thine Own Self". During the mid-1990s, he taught design at Watkins College of Art, Design & Film in Nashville, Tennessee.

== Death ==
He was diagnosed with pancreatic cancer in 2012. Mees died on March 29, 2013, aged 57, at his home in Selinsgrove, Pennsylvania.
