= Bill Ross (art director) =

American art director and production designer

- Born: William Perrin Ross; January 28, 1915; Wilkes-Barre, Pennsylvania, U.S.
- Died: September 3, 1995 (aged 80); Kern County, California, U.S.
- Occupations: Art director, production designer
- Spouse: Margaret Peggy Dare
- Children: 3

William Perrin Ross (January 28, 1915 – September 3, 1995) was an American art director and production designer. He won a Primetime Emmy Award and was nominated for another one in the category of Outstanding Art Direction for his work on the television program Mission: Impossible.

Ross died on September 3, 1995, at the Mercy Hospital in Kern County, California, at the age of 80.
