= 17th Primetime Emmy Awards =

1965 American television programming awards

- Date: September 12, 1965
- Location: Hollywood Palladium, Los Angeles, California
- Presented by: Academy of Television Arts and Sciences
- Hosted by: Sammy Davis Jr. Danny Thomas

Highlights
- Most awards: Hallmark Hall of Fame: "The Magnificent Yankee" (3)
- Most nominations: Hallmark Hall of Fame (5)
- Outstanding Program Achievements in Entertainment: The Dick Van Dyke Show; Hallmark Hall of Fame: "The Magnificent Yankee"; My Name Is Barbra; Young People's Concerts: "What Is Sonata Form?"

Television/radio coverage
- Network: NBC

The 17th Emmy Awards, later known as the 17th Primetime Emmy Awards, were handed out on September 12, 1965. The ceremony was hosted by Sammy Davis Jr. and Danny Thomas. Winners are listed in bold and series' networks are in parentheses.

The structure of the ceremony was a complete departure from previous years. Categories were streamlined so that there were only four major categories (the previous year had 20 major categories). As a result of this, only five shows won an award. NBC's Hallmark Hall of Fame was the top show of the night, winning three major awards. The new format would be scrapped for the traditional one the following year and all subsequent Primetime Emmy Awards ceremonies.

== Winners and nominees ==
Winners are listed first, highlighted in boldface, and indicated with a double dagger (‡).

=== Programs ===
Programs
**Outstanding Program Achievements in Entertainment**
- **The Dick Van Dyke Show (CBS)**‡
- **Hallmark Hall of Fame: "The Magnificent Yankee" (NBC)**‡
- **My Name Is Barbra (CBS)**‡
- **New York Philharmonic Young People's Concerts: "What Is Sonata Form?" (CBS)**‡
  - The Andy Williams Show (NBC)
  - Bob Hope Presents the Chrysler Theatre (NBC)
  - A Carol for Another Christmas (ABC)
  - The Defenders (CBS)
  - Hallmark Hall of Fame (NBC)
  - The Man from U.N.C.L.E. (NBC)
  - Mr. Novak (NBC)
  - Profiles in Courage (NBC)
  - Walt Disney's Wonderful World of Color (NBC)
  - Who Has Seen the Wind? (ABC)
  - The Wonderful World of Burlesque (NBC)

=== Acting ===
Acting
**Outstanding Individual Achievements in Entertainment - Actors and Performers**
- **Leonard Bernstein – New York Philharmonic Young People's Concerts as himself (CBS)**‡
- **Lynn Fontanne – Hallmark Hall of Fame: "The Magnificent Yankee" as Fanny Bowditch Holmes (NBC)**‡
- **Alfred Lunt – Hallmark Hall of Fame: "The Magnificent Yankee" as Oliver Wendell Holmes (NBC)**‡
- **Barbra Streisand – My Name Is Barbra as herself (CBS)**‡
- **Dick Van Dyke – The Dick Van Dyke Show as Rob Petrie (CBS)**‡
  - Julie Andrews – The Andy Williams Show as herself (NBC)
  - Johnny Carson – The Tonight Show Starring Johnny Carson as himself (NBC)
  - Gladys Cooper – The Rogues as Auntie Margaret (NBC)
  - Robert Coote – The Rogues as Timmy Fleming (NBC)
  - Richard Crenna – Slattery's People as James Slattery (CBS)
  - Julie Harris – Hallmark Hall of Fame: "The Holy Terror" as Florence Nightingale (NBC)
  - Bob Hope – Bob Hope Presents the Chrysler Theatre: "Bob Hope Comedy Special" as himself (NBC)
  - Dean Jagger – Mr. Novak as Principal Albert Vane (NBC)
  - Danny Kaye – The Danny Kaye Show as himself (CBS)
  - David McCallum – The Man from U.N.C.L.E. as Illya Kuryakin (NBC)
  - Red Skelton – The Red Skelton Show as various characters (CBS)

=== Directing ===
Directing
**Outstanding Individual Achievements in Entertainment - Directors**
- **The Defenders: "The 700 Year Old Gang" – Paul Bogart (CBS)**‡
  - Hallmark Hall of Fame: "The Magnificent Yankee" – George Schaefer (NBC)
  - My Name Is Barbra – Dwight Hemion (CBS)

=== Writing ===
Writing
**Outstanding Individual Achievements in Entertainment - Writers**
- **The Defenders: "The 700 Year Old Gang" – David Karp (CBS)**‡
  - The Dick Van Dyke Show: "Never Bathe on Sunday" – Carl Reiner (CBS)
  - Hallmark Hall of Fame: "The Magnificent Yankee" – Robert Hartung (NBC)
  - That Was the Week That Was – Gerald Gardner, Larry Siegel, Buck Henry, Gloria Steinem, Robert Emmett, Calvin Trillin, Dee Caruso, William Boardman, Joseph Hurley, Herbert Sargent, David Frost, Jim Stevenson, Thomas Meehan, and Saul Turteltaub (NBC)
  - The Wonderful World of Burlesque – Arnie Rosen and Coleman Jacoby (NBC)

== Most major nominations ==
Networks with multiple major nominations (Note: "Major" constitutes the categories listed above: Program, Acting, Directing, and Writing. Does not include the technical categories.)
Network	Number of Nominations
NBC	21
CBS	14
ABC	2

Programs with multiple major nominations
Program	Network	Number of Nominations
Hallmark Hall of Fame	NBC	6
The Defenders	CBS	3
The Dick Van Dyke Show	CBS	3
My Name is Barbra	CBS	3
The Andy Williams Show	NBC	2
Bob Hope Presents the Chrysler Theatre	NBC	2
The Man from U.N.C.L.E.	NBC	2
Mr. Novak	NBC	2
The Rogues	NBC	2
The Wonderful World of Burlesque	NBC	2
Young People's Concerts	CBS	2

== Most major awards ==
Networks with multiple major awards
Network	Number of Awards
CBS	8
NBC	3

Programs with multiple major awards
Program	Network	Number of Awards
Hallmark Hall of Fame	NBC	3
The Defenders	CBS	2
The Dick Van Dyke Show	CBS	2
My Name is Barbra	CBS	2
Young People's Concerts	CBS	2
