= Robert Checchi =

American set decorator

- Born: Robert Joseph Checchi; April 20, 1926; Pennsylvania, U.S.
- Died: June 4, 1993 (aged 67); Los Angeles, California, U.S.
- Education: University of Texas
- Occupation: Set decorator

Robert Joseph Checchi (April 20, 1926 – June 4, 1993) was an American set decorator.

== Life and career ==
Checchi was born in Pennsylvania. He attended the University of Texas, graduating with a degree in architecture.

Checchi worked as a set designer for CBS after moving to Hollywood, California. In 1972, he was nominated for his first Primetime Emmy Award for his work on the television program The Glen Campbell Show. He later won five Emmys and was nominated for four more in the category Outstanding Art Direction for his work on Benjamin Franklin, Cher, Eccentricities of a Nightingale, Soap, Once Upon a Brothers Grimm, Blind Ambition, Sarah, Plain and Tall and Miss Rose White.

Checchi died in June 1993 at the Cedars-Sinai Medical Center in Los Angeles, California, at the age of 67.
