= Serge Krizman =

Yugoslav-born American actor, art director and production designer

- Born: July 8, 1914; Zagreb, Kingdom of Croatia-Slavonia, Austria-Hungary
- Died: October 24, 2008 (aged 94); Santa Fe, New Mexico, U.S.
- Occupations: Actor, art director, production designer
- Spouse: Patricia Krizman
- Children: 1

Serge Krizman (July 8, 1914 – October 24, 2008) was a Yugoslav-born American actor, art director and production designer. He was nominated for two Primetime Emmy Awards in the category Outstanding Art Direction for his work on the television program Schlitz Playhouse of Stars.

Krizman died on October 24, 2008, in Santa Fe, New Mexico, at the age of 94.
