= Marilyn: The Untold Story =

1980 television film

- Genre: Biography; Drama
- Based on: Marilyn: A Biography by Norman Mailer
- Screenplay by: Dalene Young
- Directed by: Jack Arnold; John Flynn; Lawrence Schiller
- Starring: Catherine Hicks; Richard Basehart; Frank Converse; Jason Miller
- Music by: William Goldstein
- Country of origin: United States
- Original language: English

Production
- Producer: Lawrence Schiller
- Cinematography: Terry K. Meade
- Editors: Jack Gleason; Patrick Roark
- Running time: 156 minutes
- Production company: Schiller Productions Inc.

Original release
- Network: ABC
- Release: September 28, 1980

Marilyn: The Untold Story is a 1980 television film, about the life of the 1950s sex symbol-movie star, Marilyn Monroe. The feature stars Catherine Hicks as Monroe; Richard Basehart as her early-career agent Johnny Hyde; Frank Converse as her second husband Joe DiMaggio; Jason Miller as her third husband Arthur Miller; Kevin Geer as her first husband James Dougherty; Viveca Lindfors as her acting coach Natasha Lytess; and Sheree North as her mother Gladys Pearl Baker.

The film premiered on September 28, 1980, and was greeted with positive reviews. It was the second-highest-rated prime time program in the United States for the week. Catherine Hicks was praised by the critics for her portrayal of Monroe, as were others including Richard Basehart, Frank Converse, Sheree North, and Jason Miller, playing fellow playwright Arthur Miller.

== Plot ==
Norma Jeane is an orphan in California. She is seen growing up and having superstar dreams fill her head. She eventually marries, starts modelling, divorces, signs a contract with 20th Century Fox, and changes her moniker to Marilyn Monroe. Her personal life with her husbands, baseball-star Joe DiMaggio and playwright Arthur Miller are detailed along with her rise to stardom, her career peak, and her tragic final years ending with her death.

== Cast ==
- Catherine Hicks as Marilyn Monroe
- Richard Basehart as Johnny Hyde
- Frank Converse as Joe DiMaggio
- Jason Miller as Arthur Miller
- John Ireland as John Huston
- Viveca Lindfors as Natasha Lytess
- Sheree North as Gladys Pearl Baker
- Kevin Geer as James Dougherty
- Tracey Gold as Young Norma Jeane
- Priscilla Morrill as Louella Parsons
- John Christy Ewing as Lawyer
- Bill Vint as Montgomery Clift
- Larry Pennell as Clark Gable
- Heath Jobes as Tom Ewell
- Howard Caine as Billy Wilder
- Harry Bartron as Reporter

== Production ==
John Flynn later recalled:

I quit about two-thirds of the way through, because [producer] Schiller kept interfering with the production, changing my camera set-ups, changing the wardrobe. Schiller is a very bright guy, but he drove me up the wall with his constant meddling, to the point where I literally had my hands around his neck one day. So I left and Schiller brought in Jack Arnold to finish the picture. I shot all the footage with Richard Basehart, Catherine Hicks and John Ireland, who was terrific as director John Huston. I cast this picture very carefully. Sheree North was outstanding as Marilyn’s crazy mother. Jocelyn Brando (Marlon’s sister) had a small part as Marilyn’s grandmother, and she made the most of it. Catherine Hicks was good, but she was kind of an imitation of Marilyn Monroe. I begged Bonnie Bedelia to take the part of Marilyn, but she turned it down. She was a great actress and an absolute knockout back then. I thought Bonnie would have been brilliant as Marilyn. Even Schiller agreed to cast her, but Bonnie wouldn’t do it.

Hicks auditioned three times for the role of Marilyn before given the role. In an April 2015 radio interview, she said ABC wanted Ann Jillian for the part, but Larry Schiller fought for her.

Sheree North, who portrayed Marilyn's mother Gladys in the movie, was under contract to 20th Century Fox at the same time as Marilyn Monroe, and said she coached Catherine Hicks on playing Marilyn.

== Awards and nominations ==
Year	Award	Category	Nominee(s)	Result	Ref.
1981	Primetime Emmy Awards	Outstanding Lead Actress in a Limited Series or a Special	Catherine Hicks	Nominated	
1981	Primetime Emmy Awards	Outstanding Cinematography for a Limited Series or a Special	Terry K. Meade	Nominated	
1981	Primetime Emmy Awards	Outstanding Art Direction for a Limited Series or a Special	Jan Scott, Sydney Z. Litwack, and Bill Harp	Nominated	
1981	Primetime Emmy Awards	Outstanding Achievement in Makeup	Allan Snyder	Nominated	
