= Jan M. Van Tamelen =

American art director

- Born: January 16, 1912; Zeeland, Michigan, U.S.
- Died: February 22, 1995 (aged 83); Woodland Hills, California, U.S.
- Occupation: Art director
- Spouse: Mildred Van Tamelen
- Children: 4

Jan M. Van Tamelen (January 16, 1912 – February 22, 1995) was an American art director. He was nominated for two Primetime Emmy Awards in the category Outstanding Art Direction for his work on the television program Mannix.

Van Tamelen died on February 22, 1995, in Woodland Hills, California, at the age of 83. He was buried in Pierce Brothers Valley Oaks Memorial Park.
