= George R. Nelson =

American set decorator (1927–1992)

- Born: May 22, 1927
- Died: August 25, 1992 (aged 65); Los Angeles, California
- Occupation: Set decorator
- Years active: 1954-1991

George R. Nelson (May 22, 1927 – August 25, 1992) was an American set decorator. He won an Academy Award and was nominated for three more in the category Best Art Direction.

== Selected filmography ==
Nelson won an Academy Award for Best Art Direction and was nominated for three more:

Won

- The Godfather Part II (1974)

Nominated

- The Brink's Job (1978)
- Apocalypse Now (1979)
- The Right Stuff (1983)
