= Edward Stephenson (art director) =

American art director and production designer

- Born: Edward Sheffield Stephenson; February 9, 1917; Algona, Iowa, U.S.
- Died: February 28, 2011 (aged 94); Hollywood Hills, California, U.S.
- Occupations: Art director, production designer
- Children: 1

Edward Sheffield Stephenson (February 9, 1917 – February 28, 2011) was an American art director and production designer. He won three Primetime Emmy Awards and was nominated for three more in the categories Outstanding Art Direction and Outstanding Variety Series for his work on the television programs The Danny Kaye Show, The Andy Williams Show, Soap, The Golden Girls and the television special An Evening with Fred Astaire.

Stephenson died on February 28, 2011, from complications of Alzheimer's disease and pneumonia at his home in Hollywood Hills, California, at the age of 94.
