= Gary Allen (art director) =

American-Canadian art director

- Born: Gary Pembroke Allen; November 13, 1936; California, U.S.
- Died: December 14, 2018 (aged 82); Vancouver, British Columbia, Canada
- Education: San Francisco State University
- Occupation: Art director
- Years active: 1987–2006

Gary Pembroke Allen (November 13, 1936 – December 14, 2018) was an American-Canadian art director. He won a Primetime Emmy Award in the category Outstanding Art Direction for his work on the television program The X-Files. His win was shared with Graeme Murray and Shirley Inget.

Allen died in Vancouver, British Columbia on December 14, 2018, at the age of 82.
