= Jeffrey Howard (art director) =

American art director and production desginer

- Occupations: Art director, production designer
- Years active: 1976–2000

Jeffrey Howard is an American art director and production designer. He won a Primetime Emmy Award in the category Outstanding Art Direction for his work on the television program Miami Vice. His win was shared with Robert Lacey Jr.
