= Roy Christopher =

American art director and production designer (1935–2021)

- Born: Roy Christopher Hergenroeder; December 27, 1935; Fresno, California, U.S.
- Died: February 2, 2021 (aged 85); West Hollywood, California, U.S.
- Education: California State University
- Occupations: Art director, production designer
- Spouse: Dorothy Christopher

Roy Christopher Hergenroeder (December 27, 1935 – February 2, 2021) was an American art director and production designer.

== Early life ==
Christopher, the son of a farmer, was born Roy Christopher Hergenroeder in Fresno, California. Christopher received a bachelor's degree from California State University in 1957. The university awarded him an Honorary Doctor of Fine Arts degree in 2007.

== Career ==
Christopher began his career in 1970, as art director on the television series The Name of the Game.

In 1976 received his first nomination for a Primetime Emmy award for his art directing work on the television special The Legendary Curse of the Hope Diamond. He won his first Emmy in 1978 for The Richard Pryor Show.

From 1979 onwards Christopher was art director and production designer for the Academy Awards. He also worked on the Grammy Awards and Emmy Awards specials. Between 1981 and 2008, he won ten Emmy Awards for his work on the Oscar ceremonies, also winning in 2004 for Frasier.

In 1984 Christopher was designer for the Broadway production of the play A Woman of Independent Means. He also worked on television programs including Growing Pains, Murphy Brown, Wings, NewsRadio, Just Shoot Me! and Becker.

In 2017, Christopher was inducted into the Television Hall of Fame.

== Death ==
Christopher died in his sleep at his home in West Hollywood, California, at the age of 85.
