= The Magnificent Yankee (1965 film) =

- Genre: Drama
- Based on: play by Emmet Lavery
- Screenplay by: Robert Hartung
- Directed by: George Schaefer
- Starring: Alfred Lunt; Lynn Fontanne; Jordan Charney; Grover Dale; James Daly; Robert Emhardt; Eduard Franz; William Griffis
- Country of origin: United States
- Original language: English

Original release
- Network: NBC
- Release: January 28, 1965

The Magnificent Yankee is a 1965 biographical film in the Hallmark Hall of Fame television anthology series. The film was adapted by Robert Hartung from the Emmet Lavery 1946 play of the same title, which was in-turn adapted from the 1942 book Mr. Justice Holmes by Francis Biddle. The story examines the life of United States Supreme Court Justice Oliver Wendell Holmes. Alfred Lunt and Lynn Fontanne won Primetime Emmy Awards for their performances. Eduard Franz reprised his role as Louis Brandeis from the original 1950 film version.

Director George Schaefer won a Primetime Emmy for Outstanding Program Achievements in Entertainment, Phil Hyams as lighting director, and Bob O'Bradovich as make-up artist. Nominations went to Robert Hartung for the screenplay, Noel Taylor for costume design, and Warren Clymer for scenic design.

== Cast and characters ==
- Alfred Lunt – Oliver Wendell Holmes
- Lynn Fontanne – Fanny Holmes
- Jordan Charney – Halloran
- Grover Dale – Mapes
- James Daly – Owen Wister
- Robert Emhardt – Henry Adams
- Eduard Franz – Louis Brandeis
- William Griffis – Theodore Roosevelt
- Ion Berger – Mason
- Brenda Forbes – Mary
- Walter Moulder – Copeland
- Lee Goodman – Dixon
- Donald Symington – Hamilton
- Dennis Cooney – Northrop
- Max Jacobs – Rogers
- Nan McFarland – Ellen Jones
