= Richard D. James (production designer) =

American art director and production designer (1936–2024)

- Born: Richard Dale James; April 7, 1936; Fort Worth, Texas, U.S.
- Died: November 11, 2024 (aged 88); Dallas, Texas, U.S.
- Education: Texas Tech
- Occupations: Art director, production designer
- Spouse: Ron James

Richard Dale James (April 7, 1936 – November 11, 2024) was an American art director and production designer. He won a Primetime Emmy Award and was nominated for four more in the category Outstanding Art Direction for his work on the television program Star Trek: The Next Generation.

James served as a production designer on over 150 episodes of Star Trek: The Next Generation and almost 170 episodes of Star Trek: Voyager. He is also worked on the production design for several films including Getting Even and Little Girl Lost.

James died on November 11, 2024, at the University of Texas Southwestern Medical Center in Dallas, Texas, at the age of 88.
