= Geoffrey Howard =

Geoffrey Howard may refer to:

- Geoffrey Howard (British politician) (1877–1935), British Liberal politician
- Geoffrey Howard (cricketer) (1909–2002), English cricketer and administrator
- Geoff Howard (born 1955), Australian Labor politician
- Geoffrey Howard (British Army officer) (1876–1966), British general
- Ralph Cosham, pseudonym Geoffrey Howard (1936–2014), book narrator and actor

== See also ==
- Jeffrey Howard (disambiguation)
