= Tom H. John =

American art director, production designer and set designer

- Born: Thomas H. John; 1931; Waukegan, Illinois, U.S.
- Died: April 11, 2026 (aged 95); New York, U.S.
- Occupations: Art director, production designer, set designer
- Years active: 1964–1998

Thomas H. John (1931 – April 11, 2026) was an American art director, production designer and set designer. He won three Primetime Emmy Awards and was nominated for two more in the category Outstanding Art Direction for his work on the television program Beacon Hill, the television films Death of a Salesman and Much Ado About Nothing, and the television specials My Name is Barbra and Color Me Barbra.

In addition to his Primetime Emmy Awards wins, he was nominated for a Drama Desk Award in the category Outstanding Set Design for the play The Wiz.

John died on April 11, 2026 in New York, at the age of 95.
