= Jeffrey L. Goldstein =

American art director and production designer

- Occupations: Art director, production designer
- Years active: 1977–2009

Jeffrey L. Goldstein is an American art director and production designer. He won a Primetime Emmy Award and was nominated for two more in the category Outstanding Art Direction for his work on the television programs Hill Street Blues and L.A. Law.
