= Howard E. Johnson (art director) =

American art director

- Occupation: Art director
- Years active: 1956–1984

Howard E. Johnson was an American art director. He won two Primetime Emmy Awards and was nominated for another one in the category Outstanding Art Direction for his work on the television programs Wagon Train, Little Women and The Gangster Chronicles.
