= Angelo P. Graham =

American art director

- Born: February 16, 1932; United States
- Died: November 7, 2017 (aged 85)
- Occupations: Art director, Production Designer
- Years active: 1970-2000

Angelo P. Graham (February 16, 1932 – November 7, 2017) was an American art director. He won an Academy Award and was nominated for three more in the category Best Art Direction. He worked on nearly 30 films during his 30-year career.

== Selected filmography ==
Graham won an Academy Award for Best Art Direction and was nominated for three more:

Won

- The Godfather Part II (1974)

Nominated

- The Brink's Job (1978)
- Apocalypse Now (1979)
- The Natural (1984)
