= Robert George Freer =

American set decorator

- Occupation: Set decorator
- Years active: 1967–1986

Robert George Freer is an American set decorator. He won two Primetime Emmy Awards and was nominated for another one in the category Outstanding Art Direction for his work on the television programs Centennial, The Gangster Chronicles and Tales of the Gold Monkey.
