= James Hulsey =

American art director and production designer

- Born: James G. Hulsey; 1926 or 1927 (age 99–100)
- Occupations: Art director, production designer
- Years active: 1962–1999
- Spouse: Donna Lucy Hartman (m. 1953)

James G. Hulsey (born 1926/1927) is an American art director and production designer. He won three Primetime Emmy Awards and was nominated for four more in the category Outstanding Art Direction for his work on the television programs St. Elsewhere, The Duck Factory and I'll Fly Away, and the television films The Red Pony, The Letter, A Streetcar Named Desire and An Early Frost.
