= James J. Agazzi =

American art director and production designer

- Born: James Joseph Agazzi; October 23, 1940; Joliet, Illinois, U.S.
- Died: September 15, 2019 (aged 78)
- Education: University of California, Los Angeles
- Occupations: Art director, production designer
- Spouse: David Brewer (m. 2013)

James Joseph Agazzi (October 23, 1940 – September 15, 2019) was an American art director and production designer.

== Life and career ==
Agazzi was born in Joliet, Illinois, the son of George Agazzi and Dorothy Kokalj. He attended the University of California, Los Angeles, earning his MFA degree in theatre arts. He worked as an art director for Bob Hope and Danny Thomas's television specials.

In 1981, Agazzi was nominated for his first Primetime Emmy Award in the category Outstanding Art Direction for his work on the television program Hart to Hart. His nomination was shared with Paul Sylos and Robert Signorelli. In 1989, he won an Emmy again and was nominated for six more for his work on the television programs Moonlighting, There Must Be a Pony and Liz: The Elizabeth Taylor Story. He was a production manager.

== Personal life and death ==
In 2013, Agazzi married David Brewer. Their marriage lasted until Agazzi's death in 2019.

Agazzi died on September 15, 2019, at the age of 78.
