= Shirley Inget =

Canadian set decorator

- Occupation: Set decorator
- Years active: 1980–2021

Shirley Inget is a Canadian set decorator. She won two Primetime Emmy Awards and was nominated for two more in the categories Outstanding Art Direction and Outstanding Production Design for her work on the television programs The X-Files and Fargo.
