= Graeme Murray (art director) =

Canadian art director and production designer

- Born: February 21, 1945
- Died: April 9, 2025 (aged 80)
- Occupations: Art director, production designer
- Years active: 1976–2006
- Children: Katharine Isabelle

Graeme Murray (February 21, 1945 – April 9, 2025) was a Canadian art director and production designer. He won two Primetime Emmy Awards and was nominated for another one in the category Outstanding Art Direction for his work on the television program The X-Files.

Murray died on April 9, 2025, at the age of 80.
