= John W. Corso =

American art director and production designer (1929–2019)

- Born: John William Corso; December 29, 1929; Wabash, Indiana
- Died: October 9, 2019 (aged 89); Huntington, Indiana
- Occupation: Art director
- Years active: 1971-1992

John William Corso (December 4, 1929 – October 9, 2019) was an American art director and production designer. He was nominated for an Academy Award in the category Best Art Direction for the film Coal Miner's Daughter. Corso was a native of Wabash, Indiana.

== Selected filmography ==
- Coal Miner's Daughter (1980)
