= Set decorator =

Person in charge of the set dressing on a film

The set decorator is the head of the set decoration department in the film and television industry and is responsible for the creative vision of the interior design and set elements for each set in a feature film, television, or new media episode or commercial, in support of the story, characters, or brand of the script. The set decorator is responsible for the vision and curating the overall look and feeling of the set environments including the practical lighting, technology, art, furniture, drapery, floor coverings, books, collectables, to exterior furnishings such as satellite dishes, Old West water troughs, streetlamps, traffic lights, garden furniture and sculptures. Their creative direction creates the layers and signals the characters or brands identity often with great research and consideration to many of the elements. They are also responsible for overseeing the set decoration department operations including budgets, hiring, scheduling, leading, contracting, and managing teams.

While the set decorator provides a focused creative vision of the environment to tell the story and engage with the character and audience, the Propmaster provides elements that are handled by the actor. For example: a library is decorated with set dressing such as the furniture, books, desk lamp, blotter, framed photos, personal effects, letter trays, letter opener, papers, paper files. The Propmaster provides the props – the letter the actor is opening and reading, the pen they write with, and the ink into which they dip their pen. The set decorator often collaborates with other creative departments such as wardrobe, props, and gaffers to ensure the curation of the project.

== Description of role ==
Set Decorators are Key Department Heads, hired by the Producer, but often recommended by the Production Designer for their creative talent to collaborate with the Production Designer on the visual interpretation of the script and its characters; and for technical skills and expertise in project management including budgeting, hiring, scheduling and organizing the Set Decoration Department staff. The Set Decoration Department requires an extensive skillset to provide creative strategy and direction, collaborate with key stakeholders like the production designer, director and clients, as well as manage people, budgets, timelines, and build and develop working processes for each project. Typically they often have multiple managers working under them who are leading teams within the department - such as the lead buyer, leadman, and assistant set decorator.

Working in partnership with the Production Designer, the Director, and the Producer, the Set Decorator researches, budgets, designs and presents visual concepts for each set in the script.

Creatively, interior design and set dressing elements convey mood, style, time period, location, genre, character, and backstory, and shape the visual imagery of the project. Collaborating with the Production Designer, approved by the Director/ Producer and Studio, along with drawings and illustrations from the Art Department, the Set Decorator budgets, designs spaces and experiences, draws floor plans, sources, builds, contracts, negotiates, schedules and eventually supervises the installation of the set dressing in each set, including industrial equipment, lighting fixtures, graphics, furniture, artwork, drapery, decorative accents, florals, floor coverings, and exterior décor to support the story.

Whether on Feature Films, Television shows, Commercials, Webisodes, or emerging media formats, the work of developing, selecting, and providing the interior design and detailed elements of the set is under the direct supervision of the Set Decorator. The Set Decorator is responsible for delivering of the look and feel of all the sets and is expected to provide significant creative direction and contribution to the life of the characters, the story, brand experience and positioning, and to collaborate extensively with other creatives on the vision of the project.

== The script breakdown ==
The Set Decorator begins each project with a series of conversations with other creatives and researching characters, time period, brand positioning, and key stakeholders needs, and then uses this information to analyze and build a vision for the overall project. Then they create a backlog of all scenes of the project, dividing them into sets, and detailing high level requirements and key creative elements. This is a collaborative process that involves pitching and testing ideas with the creative team, as well as having a reserve of selects and inspiration to move the process forward. Each set often has multiple creative concepts behind it, partially described in the script and further developed by the Set Decorator in consultation with the Producer, Director, Production Designer, and on commercials with the Client and Agency. The Set Decorator will also creatively collaborate with the Costume Designer, Property Master, and with Actors.

Each backlog involves detailed breakdowns and planning charts that evolve from high level needs into execution based planning for set dressing elements, all of which are budgeted, designed, created, and sourced. The production schedule is set outside of the Set Decoration Department but often the First A.D. will consult with the Set Decorator on timelines their department may need.

== Design skills and education ==
The visual storytelling vocabulary of a Set Decorator includes anything one can imagine - such as the history of design, art, architecture & interiors, photography and film, as well as geography, anthropology and psychology. The Decorator has to be knowledgeable about lighting, technical materials, textiles, mechanics of machinery and technology, paint techniques, construction practices, upholstery and drapery, decorating trends, period details, color theory, and be proficient at spatial furniture layouts for film. Additionally, the Set Decorator needs to be an expert at how to convey an emotion and experience through visual mediums.

Typically a Set Decorator has extensive training in visual composition and expression - often they have a higher degree in the area of visual expression or interior design.

This knowledge combines with strong research, design training and judgment, cultural understanding, and observation skills to create interior and exterior environments rich in character and style to bring the script to visual life.

== Budgeting ==
The Set Decorator creates a materials budget for the film or episode, and a labor budget based on the production schedule and scope of work. Labor costs are calculated to include overtime, fringes and kit rentals. The budget allows for equipping workshops, expendables, 2nd unit requirements, camera tests, and work performed for the Set Decoration department by other departments and specialty vendors.

Budgeting involves projecting costs for prototypes, and educated guesswork. Set Decorators are familiar with pricing structures for each element and labor required to complete the work within production schedules. Set Decoration budgets may be revised several times in the course of preproduction due to shifting circumstances.

Even after the Producer has approved the Set Decoration budget, the estimate is updated as special requests by the Director, script rewrites, or shifts in schedules bring changes during production. Overseeing creative aspects of Set Decoration while staying within the budget and delivering the sets on time are key skillsets of the Set Decorator. Producers rely on the accuracy of the Set Decorator's budget to ensure that the overall production budget remains within its bounds.

== Collaboration ==
The Set Decorator attends concept production meetings, scouts, safety classes, legal clearance briefings, product placement meetings, and ongoing conferences with the Production Designer, Director, Producers, the Art Department and Accounting.

The Set Decorator maintains communication with fellow Key Department Heads, including the Assistant Director, Director of Photography, Gaffer, Propmaster, Construction Coordinator, Lead Scenic Artist, Location Manager, Costume Designer, Greensman, Special Effects Coordinator, Key Grip, Production Sound Mixer, Visual Effects Producer, and Stunt Coordinator. This ensures a smooth flow of information to fulfill the visual and technical requirements of the production.

The Set Decorator opens every set ensuring that the Director is satisfied, and makes any changes necessary.

== Scheduling ==
The Set Decorator works with their staff to develop a schedule of fabricating and procuring the set dressing elements. Working with the Leadperson and Location Manager, the Dress/Strike schedule is developed, dictated by the shooting schedule. This defines the labor budget for the Set Decoration department.

The Set Decorator schedules and supervises the work of the Assistant Set Decorators, Leadperson, Buyers, Budget Tracker, On-Set Dressers, Property Persons, Drapers and Upholsterers, and all inside and outside manufacturers

== Staffing ==
The Set Decorator selects, acquires, and oversees designs and builds for all the sets. They supervise the Assistant Decorators and Buyers as they source elements, and give final approval to all choices.

The Set Decorator works with their Leadperson, a manager who works under the decorator, to review schedules, logistics, and navigate vendor/fabricator relationships. Once the set dressing is acquired and inventoried, the Leadperson supervises the transportation of all elements to the sets. After delivery to the stage or location, the Set Decorator directs the Set Dressing crew in the decoration of the set, following Safety Guidelines, IATSE Union Contracts and industry past practice. The Leadperson is responsible for the set dressers and they work as a team within compressed schedules and side by side with Art Direction, Construction, Locations, Paint, Set Lighting, Grip, and Special Effects. Set maintenance plays a large part for long-term sets for many films and TV shows.

The Set Decorator is responsible for budgeting, hiring and managing his/her staff according to the requirements of each production including but not limited to:

- Leadperson
- Assistant Set Decorators
- Set Decoration Buyers
- Set Dressers / Swing Gang
- On-Set Dressers
- Set Decoration Coordinator
- Drapers/ Upholsterers/ Floor coverers
- Propshop Personnel for Set Dressing fabrication incl: Cabinetmakers/ Welders/ Painters/ Sculptors/ Moldmakers/ Graphic Artists
- Outside Vendors include: Technical advisors/ Vehicle builders/ Custom fabricators/ Rental Houses/ Showrooms/ Private contracts

== Technical knowledge ==
- Film and television blocking
- Visual Storytelling
- Interior Design
- Camera positions and lenses
- Set lighting
- Depth perception
- Script continuity
- Production scheduling
- Research
- Architectural and Furniture Design History
- Sourcing
- Computer skills
- Visual communication
- Budgeting
- Contracts
- Negotiation
- Legal clearance parameters
- Fire codes
- Safety rules
- "On Set" practice
- Project Management
- People Management

== Awards, recognition, and professional associations ==
Set Decorators are eligible to receive the Emmy, BAFTA, Academy Award for Best Production Design, the Set Decorators Society of America's Film and Television Awards, and the British Film Designers Guild Production Design Awards along with the Production Designer, as well as recognition by the Art Directors Guild Award. In Canada, Set Decorators are eligible to be nominated, alongside Production Designers, for the Canadian Screen Awards.

Set Decorators are represented in North America by the IATSE labor union, under jurisdiction of Local 44 (Los Angeles), Local 52 (New York), and various other regional IATSE locals in the US, Canada, and Puerto Rico. In addition to IATSE in Canada, NABET 700 also represents Set Decorators and crew.

The SDSA – the Set Decorators Society of America – is the organization solely devoted to Set Decoration. The SDSA promotes the highest standards of excellence in the field worldwide, and preserves the legacy of set decoration in motion pictures and television, through its online magazine SETDECOR, INSIDE THE SET interviews, and social media presence. www.setdecorators.org .
