= Primetime Emmy Award for Outstanding Art Direction for a Miniseries or Movie =

Television award category

The Primetime Emmy Award for Outstanding Art Direction for a Miniseries or Movie is a retired award that was handed out annually at the Creative Arts Emmy Awards. In 2014, the category was restructured into Outstanding Production Design for a Narrative Contemporary or Fantasy Program (One Hour or More) and Outstanding Production Design for a Narrative Period Program (One Hour or More).

== Winners and nominations ==
=== 1950s ===
Year	Program	Episode(s)	Nominees	Network
1956
1956	Outstanding Art Direction for a Film Series			
1956	You Are There		William Ferrari	CBS
1956	Four Star Playhouse		Duncan Cramer	CBS
1956	Medic		Ernst Fegté	NBC
1956	Robin Hood		Peter Proud	CBS
1956	Schlitz Playhouse		Serge Krizman	CBS
1956	Outstanding Art Direction for a Live Series			
1956	Playwrights '56 and Producers' Showcase		Otis Riggs	NBC
1956	Alice in Wonderland and The Good Fairy (Hallmark Hall of Fame)		Jan Scott	NBC
1956	Climax!		James Dowell Vance	CBS
1956	Lux Video Theatre		William Craig Smith	NBC
1956	The Perry Como Show		Don Shirley	NBC
1956	The United States Steel Hour		Carl Kent	CBS
1957
1957	Outstanding Art Direction (Half Hour or Less)			
1957	Your Hit Parade		Paul Barnes	NBC
1957	Adventure		Grover Cole	CBS
1957	The Dinah Shore Show		Franklin Swig	NBC
1957	Frontiers of Faith		Warren Clymer	NBC
1957	G.E. Theatre		John J. Lloyd, John Robert Lloyd, John Meehan, Martin Obzina, George Patrick	CBS
1957	Outstanding Art Direction (One Hour or More)			
1957	Requiem for a Heavyweight (Playhouse 90)		Albert Heschong	CBS
1957	The Kaiser Aluminum Hour		Jan Scott	NBC
1957	Kraft Television Theatre		Duane McKinney	NBC
1957	Omnibus		Henry May	CBS
1957	The Perry Como Show		Don Shirley	NBC
1958
1958	Twelfth Night (Hallmark Hall of Fame)		Rouben Ter-Arutunian	NBC
1958	Climax!		Beulah Frankel	CBS
1958	The George Gobel Show		Robert Kelly	NBC
1958	The Perry Como Show		Don Shirley	NBC
1958	Wagon Train		Howard E. Johnson	NBC
1959
1959	Outstanding Art Direction for a Live Television Program			
1959	An Evening with Fred Astaire		Edward Stephenson	NBC
1959	The Count of Monte Cristo (DuPont Show of the Month)		Bob Wade	CBS
1959	Hamlet (DuPont Show of the Month)		Bob Markell	CBS
1959	Hans Brinker and the Silver Skates (Hallmark Hall of Fame)		Jan Scott	NBC
1959	Little Moon of Alban (Hallmark Hall of Fame)		Warren Clymer	NBC
1959	Old Man (Playhouse 90)		Walter Scott Herndon	CBS
1959	Outstanding Art Direction for a Television Film			
1959	Bernadette (Westinghouse Desilu Playhouse)		Claudio Guzmán	CBS
1959	The Californians	"The Man from Paris"	Albert M. Pyke	NBC
1959	Corporal Hardy (Alcoa-Goodyear Theatre)		John T. McCormack	CBS
1959	Most Honorable Day (The Loretta Young Show)		Frank Sylos	NBC
1959	The Texan	"The Dutches of Denver"	Ralph Berger, Charles F. Pyke	CBS

=== 1960s ===
Outstanding Achievement in Art Direction and Scenic Design

Year	Program	Episode(s)	Nominees	Network
1960
1960	Westinghouse Desilu Playhouse		Ralph Berger, Frank Smith	CBS
1960	Alfred Hitchcock Presents		John J. Lloyd	CBS
1960	The Garry Moore Show		Charles Lisanby	CBS
1961
1961	Checkmate		John J. Lloyd	CBS
1961	Perry Como's Kraft Music Hall		Gary Smith	NBC
1961	24 Hours in a Woman's Life		Jac Venza	CBS
1962
1962	Perry Como's Kraft Music Hall		Gary Smith	NBC
1962	The Garry Moore Show		Charles Lisanby	CBS
1962	The Power and the Glory		Burr Smidt	CBS
1962	The Twilight Zone		Philip Barber	CBS
1962	Theatre '62		Jan Scott	NBC
1963
1963	Walt Disney's Wonderful World of Color		Carroll Clark, Marvin Aubrey Davis	NBC
1963	Bonanza		A. Earl Hedrick, Hal Pereira	NBC
1963	The Defenders		Willard Levitas	CBS
1963	The DuPont Show of the Week		Jan Scott	NBC
1963	The Eleventh Hour		George Davis, Merrill Pye	NBC
1963	Pygmalion (Hallmark Hall of Fame)		Warren Clymer	NBC
1964
1964	The Fantasticks (Hallmark Hall of Fame)		Warren Clymer	NBC
1964	The Danny Kaye Show		Edward Stephenson	CBS
1964	The Judy Garland Show		Robert Kelly, Gary Smith	CBS
1964	The Outer Limits		Jack Poplin	ABC
1965
1965	The Holy Terror (Hallmark Hall of Fame)		Warren Clymer	NBC
1965	My Name Is Barbra		Bill Harp, Tom John	CBS
1965	A Carol for Another Christmas (Xerox Specials)		Gene Callahan, Jack Wright	NBC
1965	The Magnificent Yankee (Hallmark Hall of Fame)		Warren Clymer	NBC
1966
1966	The Hollywood Palace		James Trittipo	ABC
1966	The Andy Williams Show		Edward Stephenson	NBC
1966	Color Me Barbra		Tom John	CBS
1966	The Man from U.N.C.L.E.		George Davis, Merrill Pye, James W. Sullivan	NBC
1966	Voyage to the Bottom of the Sea		William J. Creber	ABC
1966	Walt Disney's Wonderful World of Color	"Further Adventures of Gallegher"	Carroll Clark, William H. Tuntke	NBC
1967
1967	Death of a Salesman		Earl Carlson, Tom John	CBS
1968
1968	The Fred Astaire Show		James Trittipo	CBS
1968	Kismet (Armstrong Center Theater)		George Gaines, Jan Scott	ABC
1968	Elizabeth the Queen (Hallmark Hall of Fame)		Warren Clymer	NBC
1968	Mission: Impossible	"Echo of Yesterday"	Bill Ross	CBS
1968	The Smothers Brothers Comedy Hour	"Episode 210"	Lucien Hafley, Bill Ross	CBS
1969
1969	Mission: Impossible	"The Bunker"	Lucien Hafley, Bill Ross	CBS
1969	Rowan & Martin's Laugh-In		Ken Johnson	NBC
1969	Star Trek	"All Our Yesterdays"	John M. Dwyer, Matt Jefferies	NBC

=== 1970s ===
Outstanding Art Direction for a Dramatic Program or Series

Year	Program	Episode(s)	Nominees	Network
1970
1970	Shadow Game (CBS Playhouse)		Earl Carlson, Jan Scott	CBS
1970	The File on Devlin (Hallmark Hall of Fame)		James Trittipo	NBC
1970	Man on the Moon: The Epic Journey of Apollo XI		Wesley Laws, Hugh Gray Raisky	CBS
1970	Mission: Impossible		Lucien M. Hafley, Gibson Holley	CBS
1971
1971	Hamlet (Hallmark Hall of Fame)		Peter Roden	NBC
1971	Mannix	"The Mouse That Died"	Fred R. Price, Jan M. Van Tamelen	CBS
1971	Montserrat		Jan Scott	PBS
1971	The Price (Hallmark Hall of Fame)		John Clements	NBC
1971	Vanished		John J. Lloyd, Ruby R. Levitt	NBC
1972
1972	The Scarecrow		Jan Scott	PBS
1972	Look Homeward, Angel (CBS Playhouse)		Ben Edwards	CBS
1972	Mission: Impossible		Lucien M. Hafley, Gibson Holley	CBS
1972	The Snow Goose (Hallmark Hall of Fame)		Stanley Morris	NBC
1973
1973	Much Ado About Nothing		Tom John	CBS
1973	Another Part of the Forest		Jan Scott	CBS
1973	Mannix		Fred R. Price, Jan M. Van Tamelen	CBS
1973	Mission: Impossible		Lucien M. Hafley, Gibson Holley	CBS
1973	Night of Terror		William Campbell	ABC
1973	The Red Pony		Robert F. Boyle, James Hulsey, John Kurl	NBC
1974
1974	The Lie		Jan Scott, Charles Kreiner	CBS
1974	The Autobiography of Miss Jane Pittman		Michael D. Haller	ABC
1974	The Execution of Private Slovik		Walter H. Tyler, Richard Friedman	NBC

Outstanding Art Direction for a Dramatic Special

Year	Program	Episode(s)	Nominees	Network
1975
1975	Love Among the Ruins		Carmen Dillon, Tessa Davies	ABC
1975	The Legend of Lizzie Borden		Jack De Shields, Harry Gordon	ABC
1976
1976	Eleanor and Franklin		Jan Scott, Antony Mondello	ABC
1976	Barbary Coast		Jack De Shields, Reg Allen	ABC
1976	The Legendary Curse of the Hope Diamond		Roy Christopher, Frank Lombardo	CBS
1977
1977	Eleanor and Franklin: The White House Years		Jan Scott, Anne D. McCulley	ABC
1977	Amelia Earhart		William H. Tuntke, Richard Friedman	NBC
1977	Eccentricities of a Nightingale		Trevor Williams, Robert Checchi	PBS
1977	The Last of Mrs. Lincoln		Roy Christopher, Beulah Frankel	PBS
1978
1978	Ziegfeld: The Man and His Women		John DeCuir, Richard C. Goddard	NBC
1978	The Bastard		Loyd S. Papez, Richard Friedman	Syndicated
1978	The Gathering		Jan Scott, Anne D. McCulley	ABC
1978	It Happened One Christmas		John J. Lloyd, Hal Gausman	ABC
1978	Our Town		Roy Christopher, James Shanahan	NBC

Outstanding Art Direction for a Miniseries or Movie

Year	Program	Episode(s)	Nominees	Network
1979
1979	Studs Lonigan	"Part 3"	Jan Scott, Bill Harp	NBC
1979	Backstairs at the White House	"Book One"	Richard Y. Haman, Anne D. McCulley	NBC
1979	Blind Ambition	"Part 3"	Michael Baugh, Robert Checchi, Arthur Jeph Parker	CBS
1979	Centennial	"The Shepherds"	Jack Senter, John W. Corso, Sherman Loudermilk, Joseph J. Stone, John M. Dwyer, Robert George Freer	NBC
1979	Studs Lonigan	"Part 1"	Jan Scott, Edward J. McDonald, Bill Harp	NBC

=== 1980s ===
Year	Program	Episode(s)	Nominees	Network
1980
1980	Gauguin the Savage		Wilfred Shingleton, Julian Sacks, Jean Taillandier, Cheryal Kearney, Robert Christidès	CBS
1980	All Quiet on the Western Front		John Stoll, Karel Vacek	CBS
1980	Brave New World		Tom H. John, Mary Ann Biddle	NBC
1980	The Ordeal of Dr. Mudd		Jack De Shields, Ira Bates	CBS
1980	Orphan Train		Jan Scott, Bill Harp	CBS
1980	The Silent Lovers		Michael Baugh, Jerry Adams	NBC
1981
1981	East of Eden	"Part 3"	Ray Storey, Dennis W. Peeples, Dave L. Love	ABC
1981	Marilyn: The Untold Story		Jan Scott, Sydney Z. Litwack, Bill Harp	ABC
1981	Masada	"Part 4"	Jack Senter, George Renne, Kuli Sander, Joseph J. Stone, Edward M. Parker	ABC
1981	Playing for Time		Robert Gundlach, Gary Jones	CBS
1981	Shōgun	"Part 5"	Joseph R. Jennings, Yoshinobu Nishioka, Tom Pedigo, Shoichi Yasuda	NBC
1982
1982	The Letter		James Hulsey, Jerry Adams	ABC
1982	Brideshead Revisited	"Et in Arcadia Ego"	Peter Phillips	PBS
1982	Inside the Third Reich		Rolf Zehetbauer, Kuli Sander, Herbert Strabel	ABC
1982	Marco Polo	"Part 2"	Luciano Ricceri, Bruno Cesari	NBC
1983
1983	The Thorn Birds	"Part 1"	Robert MacKichan, Jerry Adams	ABC
1983	The Life and Adventures of Nicholas Nickleby	"Part 4"	John Napier	Syndicated
1983	Little Gloria... Happy at Last		Stuart Wurtzel, Guy J. Comtois, Enrico Campana, Doug Kraner, Maurice Leblanc	NBC
1983	The Scarlet Pimpernel		Tony Curtis, Carolyn Scott	CBS
1983	The Winds of War	"The Winds Rise"	Jackson De Govia, John V. Cartwright, Malcolm Middleton, Michael Minor, Francesco Chianese, Hertha Hareiter, Thomas L. Roysden	ABC
1984
1984	A Streetcar Named Desire		James Hulsey, George R. Nelson	ABC
1984	Chiefs	"Part 2"	Charles C. Bennett, Victor Kempster	CBS
1984	The Day After		Peter Wooley, Mary Ann Good	ABC
1984	The First Olympics: Athens 1896		Michael Stringer, Fred Carter, Petros Kapouralis, Terry Parr	NBC
1984	Invitation to Hell		Hub Braden, Bill Harp	ABC
1984	The Master of Ballantrae		John Biggs, Derek Nice	CBS
1985
1985	Evergreen	"Part 1"	Jan Scott, Charles C. Bennett, David Davis, Robert Drumheller, Jacques M. Bradette	NBC
1985	Christopher Columbus		Mario Chiari, Francesco Frigeri, Enzo Eusepi	CBS
1985	A Death in California		Hub Braden, Donald J. Remacle	ABC
1985	The Jewel in the Crown	"The Regimental Silver"	Vic Symonds, Alan Pickford	PBS
1985	My Wicked, Wicked Ways: The Legend of Errol Flynn		Albert Heschong, Richard Berger, Dave L. Love	CBS
1986
1986	Death of a Salesman		Tony Walton, John Kasarda, Robert J. Franco	CBS
1986	An Early Frost		James Hulsey, Hal Gausman	NBC
1986	The Long Hot Summer	"Part 1"	Jan Scott, Keith Hein	NBC
1986	Peter the Great	"Part 1"	Aleksandr Popov, John Blezard, Freddi Dobsak	NBC
1987
1987	The Two Mrs. Grenvilles	"Part 2"	Malcolm Middleton, Herbert Westbrook, Harry Cordwell	NBC
1987	Escape from Sobibor		Allan Starski, Vlastimir Gavrik, Milorad Kalanj, Miodrag Miric	CBS
1987	Fresno	"Part 1"	Tommy Goetz, Mary Ann Good, Charles B. Pierce	CBS
1987	Lyndon Johnston		Ben Edwards, Mike Patterson	PBS
1987	There Must Be a Pony		James J. Agazzi, Ross Bellah, Audrey A. Blasdel, Jerry Adams	ABC
1988
1988	Foxfire		Jan Scott, Erica Rogalla	CBS
1988	Lincoln	"Part 1"	Paul Peters, Lynn Smart	NBC
1988	Noble House	"Part 1"	Robert W. Laing, Francesco Chianese, George Richardson, Hugh Scaife	NBC
1989
1989	I'll Be Home for Christmas		Jan Scott, Jack Taylor, Edward J. McDonald	NBC
1989	Around the World in 80 Days	"Part 1"	Vladislav Lasic, Mike Porter, Ian Watson, Jonathan Cheung, Roger Hulme, Chung Yee Fung, Svetislav Todorovic	NBC
1989	I Never Sang for My Father		Roy Christopher, Greg Richman	PBS
1989	Lonesome Dove	"The Return"	Cary White, Michael J. Sullivan	CBS
1989	War and Remembrance	"Part 12"	Guy J. Comtois, Veronica Hadfield, William Cruse, Norm Baron, Jean-Michel Hugon, Francesco Chianese, Hari Pischinger, Wally White, Don K. Ivey, Richard Reams, Jeff Haley, Malcolm Stone	ABC

=== 1990s ===
Year	Program	Episode(s)	Nominees	Network
1990
1990	The Phantom of the Opera	"Part 2"	Timian Alsaker, Jacques Bufnoir	NBC
1990	Blind Faith	"Part 2"	Jan Scott, Anthony Brockliss, Bill Harp	NBC
1990	Caroline?		Jan Scott, Joseph Litsch	CBS
1990	Great Expectations	"Part 1"	Keith Wilson, Stephen Bream	Disney
1990	The Kennedys of Massachusetts	"Part 1"	Jan Scott, Jack Taylor, Paul W. Gorfine, Jeff Haley, Tracey A. Doyle	ABC
1991
1991	The Josephine Baker Story		József Romvári, Dean Tschetter	HBO
1991	The Flash	"Pilot"	Dean Edward Mitzner, Jeanette M. Gunn	CBS
1991	An Inconvenient Woman	"Part 1"	Stephen Storer, Mimi Gramatky, Sharon Viljoen	ABC
1991	Sarah, Plain and Tall		Ed Wittstein, Robert Checchi	CBS
1992
1992	Young Indiana Jones and the Curse of the Jackal		Gavin Bocquet, Keith Pain, Lucy Richardson, Maggie Gray	ABC
1992	Cruel Doubt	"Part 2"	Jan Scott, Sandy Getzler, Donald Krafft	NBC
1992	Homefront	"Pilot"	Dean Edward Mitzner, Anne D. McCulley	ABC
1992	I'll Fly Away	"Pilot"	James Hulsey, Joseph Litsch	NBC
1992	Miss Rose White		Fred Harpman, Robert Checchi	NBC
1993
1993	Stalin		Keith Wilson, Vladimir Murzin, Alistair Kay, Vladimir Bashkin, Peter Drozd, Eugene Kamaev, Vladimir Rybin, Yuri Shuyer, Valery Tsvetkov, Alexander Kazmischev	HBO
1993	Barbarians at the Gate		Linda Pearl, Michael Armani, Jan K. Bergstrom, Karen O'Hara	HBO
1993	Citizen Cohn		Stephen Marsh, Gary Kosko, Diana Stoughton	HBO
1993	Sinatra	"Part 1"	Veronica Hadfield, Richard L. Johnson, Cindy Carr, Robin Royce	CBS
1993	Wild Palms	"Part 2"	Dins Danielsen, Mark Zuelzke, Suzette Sheets	ABC
1994
1994	Oldest Living Confederate Widow Tells All	"Part 1"	Charles C. Bennett, Amy McGary	CBS
1994	And the Band Played On		Victoria Paul, Lee Mayman, Diana Allen Williams	HBO
1994	Gypsy		Jackson De Govia, John R. Jensen, K. C. Fox	CBS
1994	Stephen King's The Stand	"Part 4"	Susan Benjamin, Nelson Coates, Michael Perry, Burton Rencher	ABC
1994	Zelda		Roger Cain, Ronald Fauteux	TNT
1995
1995	Scarlett	"Part 1"	Rodger Maus, Brian Ackland-Snow, Josie MacAvin, Joseph Litsch	CBS
1995	Buffalo Girls		Cary White, Michael J. Sullivan, Alistair Kay, Barbara Haberecht	CBS
1995	In Search of Dr. Seuss		Thomas A. Walsh, Ricardo Morin, Thomas P. Wilkins, Leslie E. Rollins	TNT
1995	Joseph	"Part 1"	Enrico Sabbatini, Paolo Biagetti	TNT
1995	Liz: The Elizabeth Taylor Story	"Part 2"	James J. Agazzi, Sandy Getzler, Donald Krafft	NBC
1995	The Piano Lesson		James William Newport, Tim Saternow, Diana Stoughton	CBS
1996
1996	Gulliver's Travels		Roger Hall, John Fenner, Alan Tomkins, Frederic Evard, Rosalind Shingleton	NBC
1996	Andersonville		Michael Z. Hanan, Edward L. Rubin, Douglas A. Mowat	TNT
1996	Harvest of Fire		Jan Scott, Paul Steffensen, Erica Rogalla	CBS
1996	Rasputin		Miljen Kreka Kljakovic, Branimir Babic, Yury Pashigorev, Lóránt Jávor, Aleksandar Denic, Livia Balogh	HBO
1996	A Streetcar Named Desire		Fred Harpman, Janet Stokes, Tom Pedigo	CBS
1997
1997	Emma		Don Taylor, Jo Graysmark, John Bush	A&E
1997	The Hunchback		Trevor Williams, József Romvári, András Maros	TNT
1997	Mrs. Santa Claus		Hub Braden, Mary Dodson, Ellen Totleben	CBS
1997	The Odyssey		Roger Hall, John King, Frederic Evard, Karen Brookes	NBC
1997	Weapons of Mass Distraction		Charles Rosen, Chas. Butcher, Charles William Breen, Stephanie Ziemer, Linda Spheeris	HBO
1998
1998	Merlin	"Part 1"	Roger Hall, John King, Michael Boone, Karen Brookes	NBC
1998	Armistead Maupin's More Tales of the City	"Part 2"	Normand Sarazin, Lise Ethier, Anne Grenier	Showtime
1998	Buffalo Soldiers		Michael Baugh, William Vail	TNT
1998	From the Earth to the Moon	"Le Voyage Dans La Lune"	Richard Toyon, Kitty Doris-Bates, Seth Reed, Amy Wells, Michele Poulik	HBO
1998	Moby Dick		Leslie Binns, Andrew Walpole, Peter Kendall, Jill Eden	USA
1999
1999	The Rat Pack		Hilda Stark, Kathleen M. McKernin, Linda Spheeris	HBO
1999	Alice in Wonderland		Roger Hall, Alan Tomkins, Rosalind Shingleton, Karen Brookes	HBO
1999	Cleopatra	"Part 1"	Martin Hitchcock, Frank Walsh, Judy Farr	ABC
1999	Horatio Hornblower	"The Fire Ships"	Andrew Mollo, Mike Joyce, Jan Chaney, Christian Huband	A&E
1999	Joan of Arc	"Part 1"	Michael Joy, Shannon Grover, Martin Martinec	CBS
1999	Winchell		Marcia Hinds, Bo Johnson, Cindy Coburn	HBO

=== 2000s ===
Year	Program	Episode(s)	Nominees	Network
2000
2000	Introducing Dorothy Dandridge		James H. Spencer, A. Leslie Thomas, Robert Greenfield	HBO
2000	Annie		Stephen Hendrickson, Edward L. Rubin, Archie D'Amico	ABC
2000	Arabian Nights	"Part 2"	Tony Burrough, Choi Ho Man, Dominic Smithers	ABC
2000	Gepetto		Charles Wood, Mark Zuelzke, Garrett Lewis	ABC
2000	RKO 281		Maria Djurkovic, Lucinda Thomson, Tatiana Macdonald	HBO
2001
2001	Anne Frank: The Whole Story	"Part 2"	Ondrej Nekvasil, Jan Vlasák, Marie Raskova	ABC
2001	Horatio Hornblower	"Mutiny"	Rob Harris, Peter Wenham, Matthew Robinson	A&E
2001	Life with Judy Garland: Me and My Shadows	"Part 1"	Dan Davis, Ian Hall, Stephanie Ziemer	ABC
2001	On Golden Pond		Eugene Lee, Matthew C. Jacobs, Joe Bevacqua	CBS
2001	61*		Rusty Smith, Denise Hudson, Anne D. McCulley	HBO
2002
2002	James Dean		Robert Pearson, Marc Dabe, Leslie McCarthy-Frankenheimer	TNT
2002	Band of Brothers	"The Breaking Point"	Anthony Pratt, Don Dossett, Alan Tomkins, Kevin Phipps, Desmond Crowe, Malcolm Stone	HBO
2002	Dinotopia	"Part 1"	Walter P. Martishius, Malcolm Middleton, Jim Morahan, Peter Walpole	ABC
2002	The Mists of Avalon	"Part 1"	Rodger Maus, Jaromír Svarc, Vlasta Svoboda, Barbora Bucharova	TNT
2002	Stephen King's Rose Red	"Part 2"	Craig Stearns, Randy Moore, Maggie Martin	ABC
2003
2003	Hitler: The Rise of Evil	"Part 1"	Marek Dobrowolski, Martin Martinec, Albrecht Konrad, Karel Vanásek	CBS
2003	Live from Baghdad		Richard Hoover, Matthew C. Jacobs, Brian Kasch	HBO
2003	Meredith Willson's The Music Man		Stephen Hendrickson, Edward Bonutto, Caroline George-Kohne	ABC
2003	My House in Umbria		Luciana Arrighi, Christina Onori, Alessandra Querzola	HBO
2003	Napoléon	"Part 2"	Richard Cunin, Réal Proulx	A&E
2004
2004	Angels in America		Stuart Wurtzel, John Kasarda, George DeTitta Jr.	HBO
2004	And Starring Pancho Villa as Himself		Herbert Pinter, Bernardo Trujillo, Jay Aroesty	HBO
2004	Horatio Hornblower	"Loyalty" & "Duty"	Rob Harris, Peter Wenham, Paul Cross, Stephen Campbell, Tina Jones	A&E
2004	Ike: Countdown to D-Day		Ralph Davies, Nick Bassett, Andy McLaren, Jill Cormack	A&E
2004	The Lion in Winter		Roger Hall, János Szabolcs, István Tóth	Showtime
2005
2005	The Lost Prince		John Paul Kelly, Emma MacDevitt, Sara Wan	PBS
2005	Warm Springs		Sarah Knowles, Scott Ritenour, Thomas Minton, Frank Galline	HBO
2005	Empire Falls		Stuart Wurtzel, John Kasarda, Maria Nay	HBO
2005	Faith of My Fathers		Vincent M. Cresciman, Raymond Pumilia	A&E
2005	The Life and Death of Peter Sellers		Norman Garwood, Chris Lowe, Lucy Richardson, John Ralph, Maggie Gray	HBO
2006
2006	Elizabeth I		Eve Stewart, Leon McCarthy, Sarah Whittle	HBO
2006	Bleak House		Simon Elliott, Bill Crutcher	PBS
2006	The Girl in the Café		Candida Otton, Andrea Coathupe	HBO
2006	Into the West		Marek Dobrowolski, Rick Roberts, Guy Barnes, Paul Healy, Wendy Ozols-Barnes	TNT
2006	Stephen King's Desperation		Phil Dagort, Jason Weil, Marcia Calosio	ABC
2007
2007	Jane Eyre		Grenville Horner, Patrick Rolfe, Clare Andrade	PBS
2007	Broken Trail		Ken Rempel, Bill Ives, Paul Healy	AMC
2007	Bury My Heart at Wounded Knee		Ian D. Thomas, Douglasann Menchions, Paul Healy	HBO
2007	Return to Halloweentown		Edward L. Rubin, Ken Kirchner	Disney
2007	The Starter Wife		Tracey Gallacher, Brian Edmonds, Rolland Pike	USA
2008
2008	John Adams		Gemma Jackson, David Crank, Christina Moore, Kathy Lucas, Sarah Whittle	HBO
2008	The Andromeda Strain		Jerry Wanek, Dan Hermansen, Merlin Dervisevic	A&E
2008	Cranford		Donal Woods, Trisha Edwards	PBS
2008	Recount		Patti Podesta, Christopher Tandon, Anuradha Mehta	HBO
2008	Tin Man		Michael Joy, Paolo G. Venturi, Mark Lane	Sci-Fi
2009
2009	Grey Gardens		Kalina Ivanov, Brandt Gordon, Norma Jean Sanders	HBO
2009	Little Dorrit		James Merifield, Paul Ghirardani, Deborah Wilson	PBS
2009	Generation Kill		Rob Harris, Mickey Lennon, Emilia Roux	HBO
2009	Into the Storm		Luciana Arrighi, Paul Ghirardani, Ian Whittaker	HBO
2009	Taking Chance		Dan Leigh, James Donahue, Ron von Blomberg	HBO

=== 2010s ===
Year	Program	Episode(s)	Nominees	Network
2010
2010	The Pacific		Anthony Pratt, Dominic Hyman, Richard Hobbs, Scott Bird, Jim Millett, Rolland Pike, Lisa Thompson	HBO
2010	Georgia O'Keeffe		Stephen Altman, John Bucklin, Helen Britten	Lifetime
2010	Return to Cranford		Donal Woods, Mark Kebby, Trisha Edwards	PBS
2010	Temple Grandin		Richard Hoover, Meghan C. Rogers, Gabriella Villarreal	HBO
2010	You Don't Know Jack		Mark Ricker, Amy Fritz, Rena DeAngelo	HBO
2011
2011	Mildred Pierce		Mark Friedberg, Peter Rogness, Ellen Christiansen	HBO
2011	Downton Abbey		Donal Woods, Charmian Adams, Gina Cromwell	PBS
2011	The Kennedys		Rocco Matteo, Mun Ying Kwun, Enrico Campana	Reelz
2011	Upstairs Downstairs		Eve Stewart, David Hindle, Julia Castle	PBS
2012
2012	Great Expectations		David Roger, Paul Ghirardani, Jo Kornstein	PBS
2012	American Horror Story	"Open House"	Mark Worthington, Edward L. Rubin, Ellen Brill	FX
2012	American Horror Story	"Pilot"	Beth A. Rubino, Charles M. Lagola, Ellen Brill	FX
2012	Hatfields & McCoys		Derek R. Hill, Serban Porupca, John B. Vertrees, Sally Black	History
2012	Hemingway & Gellhorn		Geoffrey Kirkland, Nanci Noblett, Jim Erickson	HBO
2012	Sherlock: A Scandal in Belgravia		Arwel Jones, Dafydd Shurmer, Joelle Rumbelow	PBS
2013
2013	Behind the Candelabra		Howard Cummings, Patrick M. Sullivan Jr., Barbara Munch	HBO
2013	American Horror Story: Asylum	"I Am Anne Frank, Part 2"	Mark Worthington, Andrew Murdock, Ellen Brill	FX
2013	American Horror Story: Asylum	"Welcome to Briarcliff"	Mark Worthington, Edward L. Rubin, Ellen Brill	FX
2013	Phil Spector		Patrizia von Brandenstein, Fredda Slavin, Diane Lederman	HBO
2013	Seal Team Six: The Raid on Osama Bin Laden		Guy Barnes, Rosario Provenza, Wendy Ozols-Barnes	Nat Geo
