= Films and television programmes based on Alice in Wonderland =

A variety of films and television programmes based on Alice's Adventures in Wonderland (1865) and its sequel Through the Looking-Glass, and What Alice Found There (1871) by Lewis Carroll have been created. The following is a list of close adaptations, including sequels or original works set in the same universe:

== Films ==
=== Theatrical films ===
Title	Year	Format	Country	Notes	Reference
Alice in Wonderland	1903	Live-action short (Silent)	United Kingdom	Directed by Cecil Hepworth and Percy Stow	
Alice's Adventures in Wonderland	1910	Live-action short (Silent)	United States	Directed by Edwin Stanton Porter	
Alice in Wonderland	1915	Live-action film (Silent)	United States	Directed by W. W. Young	
Alice Comedies	1923–27	Animated/Live-action short (Silent)	United States	Directed by Walt Disney, these were sold by Disney as animated shorts.	
Alice in Wonderland	1931	Live-action film	United States	Directed by Bud Pollard; first talkie	
Alice in Wonderland	1933	Live-action/Animated film	United States	Directed by Norman Z. McLeod (Live-action), with the exception of Walrus and The Carpenter sequence, which was animated by Harman-Ising Studio.	
Alice	1946		United Kingdom	BBC production starring Vivian Pickles directed by George More O'Ferrall	
Alice in Wonderland	1949	Live-action/Stop motion	France	Directed by Dallas Bower	
Alice in Wonderland	1951	Animated film	United States	Walt Disney Animation Studios, directed by Clyde Geronimi, Wilfred Jackson, Hamilton Luske. Note: a television promo (also Disney's first ever TV production) entitled One Hour in Wonderland was released the prior year	
Alice of Wonderland in Paris	1966	Animated film	United States-Czech	Childhood Productions, directed by Gene Deitch	
Alice's Adventures in Wonderland	1972	Live-action film	United Kingdom	Musical film	
Alice in Wonderland	1976	Live-action film	United States	Erotic musical comedy, directed by Bud Townsend	
Alicia en el País de las Maravillas	1976	Live-action film	Argentina	Experimental low budget Directed by Eduardo Plá, music by Charly García	
Alice or the Last Escapade	1977	Live-action film	France	Film directed by Claude Chabrol	
Alicia en la España de las maravillas (Alice in Spanish Wonderland)	1978	Live-action film	Spain	Extreme satire that sees a grown up Alicia explore the Franco era of Spain. Directed by Jordi Feliú. Mireia Ros, Sílvia Aguilar, and Montserrat Móstoles all star as Alicia, representing the regions of Spain.	
Alice in Wonderland	1981	Animated film	USSR	Alisa v Strane Chudes, animation, Kievnauchfilm,	
Alice Through the Looking Glass	1982	Animated film	USSR	Alisa v Zazerkale, animation, Kievnauchfilm	
Alice	1982	Live-action film	Poland		
Dreamchild	1985	Live-action film	United Kingdom	Directed by Gavin Millar	
Alice	1988	Live-action/Stop motion	Czechia	Directed by Jan Švankmajer	
Alice Underground	1999	Live-action short	United States	Written and directed by Robert E. Lee, US	
Alice in Wonderland	1999	Live-action	United States, United Kingdom, Germany	Written by Peter Barnes; directed by Nick Willing	
Malice in Wonderland	2009	Live-Action film	United Kingdom	Directed by Simon Fellows and written by Jayson Rothwell	
Alice in Wonderland	2010	Live-action/Animated film	United States	Directed by Tim Burton, stars Mia Wasikowska, Johnny Depp, Anne Hathaway and Helena Bonham Carter	
Alice Through the Looking Glass	2016	Live-action/Animated film	United States	Sequel to the 2010 Tim Burton film, stars Mia Wasikowska, Johnny Depp, Anne Hathaway, Sacha Baron Cohen, Rhys Ifans, Richard Armitage and Helena Bonham Carter	
Alice and the Land that Wonders	2020	Live Action Film	Italy	Directed by Giulia Grandinetti	
Come Away	2020	Live-action film	United States	Directed by Brenda Chapman	
Alice Dos Anjos (Alice in Backlands)	2021	Live action film	Brazil	Musical film, directed by Daniel Leite Almeida	
Alice, Through the Looking	2021	Live action film	United Kingdom	Satire and essay film, about a student Alice's bizarre journey through an alternate London during the Brexit era. Directed by Adam Donen, starring Saskia Axten as Alice, Carol Cleveland as the Queen of Hearts, Steven Berkoff as a producer character, Vanessa Redgrave as the Narrator. Released commercially in November 2026.	
Alice no Mundo da Internet (Alice in the Internet)	2022	Live action film	Brazil	Musical film, directed by Fabrício Bittar	
The disembodied adventures of Alice	2024	Live action film	Ireland	Directed by Cléa van der Grijn	
Dive in Wonderland	2025	Anime film	Japan		
Alice in Wonderland	2025	Live-action film	Russia	Directed by Yury Khmelnitsky, stars Anna Peresild, Oleg Savostyuk, Miloš Biković, Irina Gorbacheva, Paulina Andreeva and Sergey Burunov	
Get Lost	TBD (upcoming)	Live-Action Film	United States	Directed by Daniela Amavia	
Untitled movie musical	TBD (upcoming)	Live-action film	United States	Directed by Lorene Scafaria, stars Sabrina Carpenter	

=== Direct-to-video ===
Title	Year	Format	Country	Notes
Alice Through the Looking Glass	1987	Animated DTV film	Australia	Burbank Films Australia, directed by Andrea Bresciani and Richard Slapczynski
Alice in Wonderland	1988	Animated DTV film	Australia	Burbank Films Australia
Sugar & Spice: Alice in Wonderland	1991	Animated short TV film	Japan	written by Steve Kramer, Japan
Alice in Wonderland	1993	Original video animation	Japan	Hello Kitty and Friends OVA directed by Yasuo Ishikawa, Japan
Alice in Wonderland	1995	Animated DTV film	United States-Japan	directed by Toshiyuki Hiruma and Takashi Masunaga, Japan, US
Alice in Wonderland and Through the Looking Glass	2002	Theatre Performance	UK	Adrian Mitchell and the Royal Shakespeare Company's 2001 production. Directed by Rachel Kavanaugh. UK.
Mickey's Adventures in Wonderland	2009	Animated film	United States	Produced by Disney Channel and distributed by Walt Disney Home Video
Alice in Murderland	2010	Low-budget horror film	United States	Brain Damage Films, directed by Dennis Devine
Malice in La La Land	2010	Adult film	United States	Miss Lucifer Production, directed by Lew Xypher
Alice no País das Maravilhas	2011	Animated film	Brazil	Vídeo Brinquedo, directed by Robson Lima and Everton Rodrigues

== Television ==
Title	Year	Format	Country	Notes
Alice in Wonderland	1937	Live-action TV short	United Kingdom	directed by George More O'Ferrall
Alice	1946	Live-action TV short	United Kingdom	on BBC, starring Vivian Pickles directed by George More O'Ferrall, UK
Alice in Wonderland and Through the Looking-Glass	1948	TV broadcast	United Kingdom	BBC production
Alice in Wonderland	1950	Live-action TV film	United States	Broadcast on the CBS Ford Theatre, starring Iris Mann as Alice, directed by Franklin J. Schaffner.
Alice au pays des Merveilles	1951	TV film	France	TV broadcast of a stage version
Alice in Wonderland	1955	Live-action TV film	United States	a live television adaptation of the 1932 Broadway version of the novel, co-written by Eva LeGallienne and directed by George Schaefer for the Hallmark Hall of Fame
The Adventures of Alice	1960	Live-action TV film	United Kingdom	The play is based on the books Alice's Adventures in Wonderland and Through the Looking-Glass by Lewis Carroll.
Alice in Wonderland	1962	Live-action TV film	Australia	It was a pantomime and aired as part of the BP Super Show.
Alice in Wonderland (or What's a Nice Kid Like You Doing in a Place Like This?)	1966	Animated television film	United States	animated by Hanna-Barbera, with Janet Waldo as Alice
Alice in Wonderland	1966	Live-action TV film	United Kingdom	BBC television play directed by Jonathan Miller, UK
Alice Through the Looking Glass	1966	Live-action TV film	United States	Made-for-television musical directed by Alan Handley
Alice au pays des merveilles	1970	TV film	France	Directed by Jean-Christophe Averty
Alice in Wonderland	1973	Animated TV episodes	United States	Episode 17 of Festival of Family Classics, produced by Rankin/Bass
Alice Through the Looking Glass	1973	Live-action TV film	United Kingdom	BBC adaptation starring Sarah Sutton
Nel mondo di Alice	1974	TV series	Italy	
Alice in Wonderland	1977	Animated TV episode	Japan	Episode 62 of Manga Sekai Mukashi Banashi, produced by Dax International and Madhouse
Alice in Wonderland	1982	Live-action TV film	United States	televised stage adaptation by Children's Theatre Company of Minneapolis; the cast included Julee Cruise. Released by MCA Home Video
Alice at the Palace	1982	Live-action TV film	United States	film of Elizabeth Swados's 1981 Alice in Concert with Meryl Streep
Alice in Wonderland	1983	Live-action TV film	United States	on PBS's Great Performances, based on the 1982 Broadway 1932 revival
Alice in Wonderland	1983	Animated TV series	Japan	Fushigi no Kuni no Arisu, anime, Nippon Animation, Japan
Alice in Wonderland	1985	Live-action TV series	United Kingdom	on Anglia, puppetry by Stephen Mottram, UK
Alice in Wonderland	1985	Live-action TV film	United States	on CBS, directed by Harry Harris
Alice in Wonderland	1985	TV special	United States	Two-part made-for-TV special produced by Irwin Allen
Alice in Wonderland	1986	Live-action TV series	United Kingdom	four 30-minute episodes on BBC, written and directed by Barry Letts
Adventures in Wonderland	1992–95	Live-action/Puppet TV series	United States	Produced by The Walt Disney Company.
Alice in Wonderland	1995	Animated TV episode	Japan	Episode 14 of World Fairy Tale Series by Toei Animation
Alice in Russialand	1995	TV Special	US, USSR, UK	World Vision Enterprises/Channel 4 UK. TV special on culture and history in the USSR, directed by Ken Russell. Part of a series called Momentous Events about the USSR.
Alice Through the Looking Glass	1998	Live-action TV film	United Kingdom	directed by John Henderson, with Kate Beckinsale as Alice, UK
Alice in Wonderland	1999	Live-action TV film	United Kingdom & United States	directed by Nick Willing, stars Ben Kingsley, Martin Short, Whoopi Goldberg, UK\US
Alice, de l'autre côté du miroir	2003	Animated TV film	France	directed by Dominque Debar, produced by Storimages
Alice (miniseries)	2009	Live-action TV miniseries	United Kingdom & Canada	Directed by Nick Willing, Canada, UK
Mickey's Adventures in Wonderland (Mickey Mouse Clubhouse)	2009	Animated TV episode	United States	Developed for television by Bobs Gannaway from the original 2009 Video of the same name
Hat Trick (Once Upon a Time)	2012	Live-action TV episode	United States	Co-written by Vladimir Cvetko and David H. Goodman, and directed by Ralph Hemecker
Jody in Wonderland (The Dumping Ground)	2013	Live-action TV episode	United Kingdom	Directed by Nigel Douglas, Christmas special
Once Upon a Time in Wonderland	2013–2014	Live-action TV series	United States	ABC Studios American fantasy-drama series created by Edward Kitsis, Adam Horowitz, Zack Estrin, and Jane Espenson
Alice's Adventures in Wonderland	2014	Ballet	Canada	The Royal Ballet A co-production with The National Ballet of Canada
CBeebies Alice in Wonderland	2015	Television film	United Kingdom	BBC CBeebies Christmas Show for children tx BBC1 18 December 2015
Liisa Ihmemaassa	2016	Ballet	Finland	YLE arena broadcast, televised performance of Jorma Elo's ballet adaptation
Alice & Lewis	2020	Animation TV	France	TF1
Alix et Les Merveilleux	2019	Live-action TV series	Canada	Radio Canada Televisions
Alice L'integral (Alice et autres Merevilles, Alice traverse le mirroir)	2021	Theatre broadcasts	France	Culturebox France, 2 part televised performance of Fabrice Meliquot's adaptations for Theatre de la Ville, Paris.
Alice's Wonderland Bakery	2022	Animated TV series	United States	Disney Junior
Alice im Wunderland	2023	Ballet live broadcast	Germany	Bayerische Staadsoper TV. co production with Royal Ballet, London
Lookingglass Alice	2023	Theatre Circus Broadcast	United States	PBS
Descendants: The Rise of Red	2024	Streaming film	United States	Disney+ film
Descendants: Wicked Wonderland	2026	Streaming film	United States	Disney+ film

== See also ==
- Works and adaptations of Alice in Wonderland.
- Alice in Wonderland (musical) - authorized production first performed in 1886.
- Alice in Wonderland and Through the Looking glass (play) - Play by Adrian Mitchell, first performed by the RSC, adapting almost all of both novels. (2001) Licensable for theatrical performances since 2009.
- Wonder.land (musical) - contemporary retelling of the Alice in Wonderland story. Staged by National Theatre artistic director Rufus Norris, scriptwriter Moira Buffini and score Damon Albarn (2015)

== Works cited ==
- Guiliano, Edward, ed. (1976). Lewis Carroll Observed: A Collection of Unpublished Photographs, Drawings, Poetry, and New Essays. C. N. Potter; Lewis Carroll Society of North America. ISBN 0-517-52497-X. OCLC 2189269.
- Tibbetts, John C.; Welsh, James M. (1998). The Encyclopedia of Novels into Film. Facts on File. ISBN 0-8160-3317-X. OCLC 36573779.
- Marill, Alvin H. (1993). More Theatre: Stage to Screen to Television. Vol. 1. Metuchen, New Jersey: Scarecrow Press. ISBN 0-8108-2717-4. OCLC 28183118.
