= Through the Looking Glass (disambiguation) =

Through the Looking-Glass is an 1871 work of children's literature by Lewis Carroll, the sequel to Alice's Adventures in Wonderland.

Through the Looking Glass or Thru the Looking Glass may also refer to:

== Adaptations of Carroll's work ==
- Alice Through the Looking Glass (1966 film), live action musical featuring Jack Palance as the Jabberwock
- Alice through the Looking Glass (1998 film), live action adaptation featuring Kate Beckinsale as Alice
- Through the Looking Glass (opera), a 2008 operatic adaptation by Alan John
- Alice Through the Looking Glass (2016 film), an adaptation blending live action and digital animation

== Film and television ==
- Through the Looking Glass (film), a 1976 film by Jonas Middleton
- "Through the Looking Glass" (Star Trek: Deep Space Nine), a 1995 episode of Star Trek: Deep Space Nine
- "Through the Looking Glass" (Farscape), a 1999 episode of Farscape
- "Through the Looking Glass" (Angel), a 2001 episode of Angel
- "Through the Looking Glass" (Lost), a 2007 episode of Lost
- "Through the Looking Glass and What Walter Found There" (Fringe), a 2012 episode of Fringe
- "Through the Looking Glass", a 2012 episode of Criminal Minds
- "Through the Looking-Glass" (Batwoman), a 2020 episode of Batwoman
- Alice Through the Looking Glass (1982 film), a 1982 Soviet fantasy comedy animated short film

== Music recordings ==
=== Albums ===
- Thru the Looking Glass (album), an album by Space Tribe
- Through the Looking Glass (Dom & Roland album)
- Through the Looking Glass (Jefferson Airplane album)
- Through the Looking Glass (Siouxsie and the Banshees album)
- Through the Looking Glass (Toto album)
- Through the Looking Glass, an album by Shadowland
- Through the Looking Glass, an album by Midori Takada

=== Songs ===
- "Through the Looking Glass", a song by Machinae Supremacy from Redeemer
- "Through the Looking Glass", a song by The Monkees from Instant Replay
- "Through the Looking Glass", a 1974 song by Mott the Hoople from The Hoople
- "Through the Looking-Glass", a song by Rublood from Star Vampire
- "Through the Looking Glass (Part I, II, III)", a 1998 song by Symphony X from Twilight in Olympus
- "Through the Looking Glass", a 2008 song by For the Fallen Dreams from Changes
- "Through the Looking Glass", a song by Chromatics from Closer to Grey

== Other uses ==
- Through the Looking Glass (video game), a 1984 video game

== See also ==
- Looking Glass (disambiguation)
- Thru the Mirror, a 1936 animated short film starring Mickey Mouse
- In the Looking Glass, a 1978 British TV comedy series
- Into the Looking Glass, a 2007 military science fiction novel by John Ringo
- Alice, Through the Looking, a 2021 British German political satirical comedy film
