= Looking Glass =

A looking glass is an object whose surface reflects an image.

Looking Glass or Lookingglass may also refer to:

== Arts and entertainment ==
=== Film and television ===
- Countdown to Looking Glass, a 1984 made-for-television movie
- Looking Glass (film), a 2018 thriller film
- "Looking Glass" (The Copenhagen Test), a 2025 television episode
- Second Chance (2016 TV series), an American science fiction crime drama television series also known as Lookinglass during preproduction
- The Looking Glass, an underwater DHARMA Initiative station in the TV series Lost

=== Music ===
- Looking Glass (band), a 1970s pop music group
  - Looking Glass (Looking Glass album), 1972
- Looking Glass (Fay Hield album), 2010
- Looking Glass (EP), a 2008 song, video and EP recording by The Birthday Massacre
- "The Looking Glass" (song), a song by Dream Theater
- "Looking Glass", a song by All Hail the Silence from their 2019 album Daggers
- "Looking Glass", a song by Allan Holdsworth from his 1986 album, Atavachron
- "Looking Glass", a song by Ashley Tisdale from her 2019 album Symptoms
- "Looking Glass", a song by Yanni from his 1986 album, Keys to Imagination
- "The Looking Glass", a song by Kamelot from The Awakening

=== Written media ===
- Looking Glass (series), a novel series created by author John Ringo
- "The Looking-Glass", a short story by Anton Chekhov
- Looking Glass, a DC Comics character, and member of The Blasters

=== Other ===
- Looking Glass Studios, a defunct video game developer
- Looking Glass Studios, a former New York City recording studio
- Lookingglass Theatre Company, based in Chicago, Illinois, U.S.

== Computing ==
- Looking Glass (UNIX desktop), a commercial desktop environment for UNIX, developed by Visix Software
- Looking Glass server, publicly accessible servers for performing routing queries, used to troubleshoot routing issues across the Internet
- Project Looking Glass, a project aiming to create a 3D desktop, conducted by Sun Microsystems

== Places ==
- Looking Glass Township, Clinton County, Illinois, United States
- Looking Glass Rock, Transylvania County, North Carolina, United States
- Looking Glass River, Michigan, United States
- Lookingglass, Oregon, Douglas County, Oregon, United States

== Other uses ==
- Looking Glass (Native American leader) (died 1877), Nez Perce war leader
- Looking glass self, an interactionist sociological concept
- Lookingglass plant, another name for Coprosma repens, small tree or shrub of New Zealand
- Operation Looking Glass, code name for an airborne command center currently operated by the U.S. Navy

== See also ==
- England's Looking Glass, a list of works with England's Looking Glass in the title
- Through the Looking Glass (disambiguation)
