= James Trittipo =

American art director

James Trittipo (June 30, 1928 — September 15, 1971) was an American television art director and stage set designer in New York and Hollywood, known for his designs of television variety shows including The Bing Crosby Show (ABC-March 2, 1959), The Frank Sinatra Show (CBS), The Frank Sinatra Timex Show: Welcome Home Elvis, and An Evening with Fred Astaire. Trittipo won Art Direction Emmy Awards for the ABC Television variety series The Hollywood Palace and An Evening with Fred Astaire. He was the art director on behalf of both ABC Television and the Academy of Motion Pictures Arts and Sciences for the 41st Academy Awards on April 14, 1969 and he designed a set "evocative of waterfront pilings" for Rod McKuen's May 10, 1969 television special on NBC. He died of a heart attack at age 43.

== See also ==
- Art Directors Guild Hall of Fame
