= England's Looking Glass =

There are a number of works with England's Looking Glass in the title. During the 16th and 17th centuries looking glass, meaning mirror, was frequently used in the titles of books.

- Thomas Lodge and Robert Greene, A Looking Glass for London and England (c.1590), an Elizabethan era stage play
- Edmund Calamy the Elder, England's Looking Glass (1642)
- William Mercer (poet), "Angliae speculum, or, England's Looking-Glasse" (1646)
- Elizabeth Pool, The Bloudy Almanack, or England's Looking-Glass (1651). (Containing the Scots Prophesie to their King)
- Rowlinson, "A Recollection of the Times, or England's Looking-Glass" (1680). It is a ballad that begins "0 Sinful World ! rouse up thy sleepy head ..."
- Ethan Abbe, "England's Looking-Glass, Tales of the Human Condition" (1812)

== See also ==
- Richard Graham Preston, "Angliae Speculum Morale: The Moral State of England, with the Several Aspects it Beareth to Virtue and Vice" (1670)
- Simon Patrick, "Angliæ speculum: a glass that flatters not" (1678)
