= Alice in Wonderland (1981 film) =

Soviet animated film

- DVD cover
- Based on: Alice's Adventures in Wonderland by Lewis Carroll
- Screenplay by: Yevhen Zahdanskyy
- Directed by: Yefrem Pruzhanskyy
- Starring: Marina Neyolova; Vyacheslav Nevinny; Tatyana Vasilyeva; Aleksandr Shirvindt
- Narrated by: Rostislav Plyatt
- Music by: Luigi Boccherini; Ottorino Respighi; Andrzej Korzyński; Yevgeny Ptichkin
- Country of origin: Soviet Union
- Original language: Russian

Production
- Cinematography: Aleksandr Mukhin
- Editor: Svetlana Kutsenko
- Running time: 30 minutes
- Production company: Kievnauchfilm

Original release
- Release: 1981 – 1981

Related
- Alice Through the Looking Glass

Alice in Wonderland (Russian: «Алиса в Стране чудес», romanized: Alisa v Strane chudes) is a 1981 Soviet fantasy comedy animated short film, based on Lewis Carroll's 1865 novel Alice's Adventures in Wonderland. It was produced by Kievnauchfilm and directed by Yefrem Pruzhanskyy. It originally aired on Ukrainian television in three parts. The sequel Alice Through the Looking Glass, based on Lewis Carroll's novel Through the Looking-Glass, was released in 1982.

== Plot ==
The cartoon is based on the novel by Lewis Carroll. One summer day, a girl named Alice, who chasing a White Rabbit with a pocket watch, falls into a rabbit hole and finds herself in Wonderland. Here, Alice will to become smaller and bigger, meet the Blue Caterpillar and the Cheshire Cat, go to a "mad tea party" with the Hatter and the March Hare, find out why gardeners paint roses red, meet the Queen of Hearts on the croquet grounds, and finally take part in the trial of the Jack of Hearts, who stole the royal tarts.

== Voice cast ==
- Marina Neyolova as Alice
- Vyacheslav Nevinny as White Rabbit
- Tatyana Vasilyeva as Queen of Hearts
- Rina Zelyonaya as Duchess
- Aleksandr Burmistrov as Hatter
- Yevhen Paperny as Knave of Hearts
- Heorhiy Kyshko as March Hare
- Aleksandr Shirvindt as Cheshire Cat
- Malvina Shvidler as Caterpillar
- Lyudmila Ignatenko as The Dormouse
- Rostislav Plyatt as Narrator
