= Alan Tomkins =

British art director (1939–2020)

- Born: 19 January 1939; Fulham, London, England
- Died: 21 September 2020 (aged 81)
- Occupation: Art director
- Years active: 1968–2005

Alan Tomkins (19 January 1939 – 21 September 2020) was a British art director. He was nominated for an Academy Award in the category Best Art Direction for the film The Empire Strikes Back. Tomkins was born in Fulham, London in 1939. He died on 21 September 2020, at the age of 81.

== Selected filmography ==
- A Touch of Class (1973)
- The Adventure of Sherlock Holmes' Smarter Brother (1975)
- A Bridge Too Far (1977)
- The Empire Strikes Back (1980)
- Trail of the Pink Panther (1982)
- Curse of the Pink Panther (1983)
- National Lampoon's European Vacation (1985)
- Robin Hood: Prince of Thieves (1991, supervising art director)
- JFK (1991)
- Rob Roy (1995)
- Saving Private Ryan (1998)
- Band of Brothers (2001, 4 episodes, senior art director)
- Die Another Day (2002)
- Batman Begins (2005, senior art director)
- Casino Royale (2006)
