= John J. Lloyd =

American art director and production designer

John J. Lloyd (June 30, 1922 – September 20, 2014) was an American art director and production designer known for his work on such films as National Lampoon's Animal House, The Blues Brothers, The Thing, Big Trouble in Little China, and The Naked Gun: From the Files of Police Squad! His death at the age of 92 was announced in October 2014.

== Early life ==
He was born in Dearborn, Michigan in 1922 but moved with his family to California in the mid-1920s. They first settled in Ramona, where Lloyd assisted his parents in operating a local mercantile store and a turkey ranch. Lloyd and his family later moved to Culver City, where his father and uncle found jobs at MGM Studios.

Lloyd served in the U.S. Navy during World War II. He was stationed at Norman, Oklahoma, where he instructed airmen on aircraft flight mechanics and aerodynamics — skills he himself learned while washing airplanes at an airfield in Culver City. After the war, Lloyd attended and graduated from Chouinard Art Institute in Los Angeles.

== Career ==
Lloyd began his career in the 1950s as an art director at Lew Wasserman's Revue Studios (later Universal Television), where he worked on television shows including Studio 57, Leave It to Beaver, The Jack Benny Program, and 137 episodes of Alfred Hitchcock Presents. He was one of the original art directors on The Munsters, where he developed the rising staircase seen in the title sequences of the show's first season. He also established the look for several pilots that were picked up to series, including Columbo, Emergency!, and Kojak.

He was nominated for an Emmy Award for his work on General Electric Theater in 1957 and again for Alfred Hitchcock Presents in 1960. He won an Emmy in 1961 for Outstanding Achievement in Art Direction and Scenic Design on the detective series Checkmate and went on to be nominated again for the 1971 two-part movie Vanished and as production designer of the 1977 TV movie It Happened One Christmas.

He moved into feature films in the late 1960s, starting with the art direction of the 1966 release Munster, Go Home! His subsequent film credits as art director include Colossus: The Forbin Project, The Day of the Locust and Animal House. His first film as production designer was 1977's MacArthur.

After working with Lloyd on Animal House, director John Landis recruited him as production designer on Landis' 1980 hit, The Blues Brothers. Lloyd and Landis collaborated for a third and final time on the 1985 release Into the Night. Lloyd also served as production designer on two films for John Carpenter: The Thing and Big Trouble in Little China. Lloyd subsequently designed such productions as Jaws: The Revenge and the first two films in the Naked Gun series, The Naked Gun: From the Files of Police Squad! and The Naked Gun 2½: The Smell of Fear.

== Death ==
Lloyd died of congestive heart failure at his home in Woodland Hills, Los Angeles, California, on September 20, 2014. He was 92. He is survived by a son, two daughters and two grandchildren.
