= Alice Through the Looking Glass (1966 film) =

1966 American TV film

- Based on: Through the Looking-Glass by Lewis Carroll
- Written by: Albert Simmons
- Directed by: Alan Handley
- Country of origin: United States
- Original language: English

Production
- Production company: NBC Studios

Original release
- Network: NBC
- Release: November 6, 1966

Alice Through the Looking Glass is a 1966 live action musical film made for television, directed by Alan Handley, and based on Lewis Carroll's 1871 novel Through the Looking-Glass. The show aired November 6, 1966 on NBC in the United States. Bob Mackie and Ray Aghayan worked together on the costume designs, which won them an Emmy Award in 1967.

== Cast ==
- Judi Rolin as Alice
- Richard Denning as Alice's Father
- Roy Castle as Lester the Jester
- Robert Coote as The Red King
- Jimmy Durante as Humpty Dumpty
- Agnes Moorehead as The Red Queen
- Jack Palance as Jabberwock
- Dick Smothers as Tweedledee
- Tom Smothers as Tweedledum
- Iris Adrian as Tiger Lily
- Ricardo Montalban as The White King
- Nanette Fabray as The White Queen

== See also ==
- Films and television programmes based on Alice in Wonderland
