= Alice and the Land that Wonders =

- Original title: ALICE NEL PAESE CHE SI MERAVIGLIA
- Directed by: Giulia Grandinetti
- Based on: Alice's Adventures in Wonderland and Through the Looking-Glass by Lewis Carroll
- Produced by: Giulia Grandinetti
- Starring: Veronica Baleani; Maria Vittoria Argenti
- Cinematography: Valerio Martorelli
- Edited by: Niccolò Notario
- Music by: Bernard Bursill Hall; Boris Riccardo D'Agostino; Riccardo Gruppuso; Daniele Locatelli; Carlo Purpura
- Production companies: Nikada Film; Videns Studios; Flat Parioli; Infinity Road Pictures
- Distributed by: Amazon Prime Video
- Release date: 2020 (Italy)
- Running time: 100
- Country: Italy
- Language: Italian
- Budget: €60,000

Alice and the Land that Wonders (original title: Alice e il Paese che si meraviglia) is a 2020/2021 Italian language arthouse experimental fantasy film by Giulia Grandinetti, based on her 2011 stage adaptation of Lewis Carroll's Alice books. The film depicts in a non linear timeline, the world perceived by the character of Alice (Veronica Baleani) an 18 year old experiencing alienation at her birthday party who falls into a dream state, where she becomes Lewis Carroll's character and experiences adventures in a strange clinic. The film features music by Bernard Bursill Hall, and is produced by Giulia Grandinetti and Paolo Grandinetti. The film was completed via crowdfunding in 2019. It has received various nominations and awards. It was distributed in Italy, the UK, and the US in 2021 by Amazon Prime Video.

== Premise ==
Alice (Veronica Baleani) feels deeply alienated at her 18th birthday party at a lavish nightclub. Between her family (Martina Badiluzzi, Marit Nissen, Massimiliano Vado) 's expectations, the sourness of fake friends, and the wondering eye of her boyfriend. Overwhelmed by the disastrous night, Alice locks herself in the staff toilets, publishes a call for help on social media, and is drawn to a bottle of vodka. She falls asleep and becomes trapped in a dreaming state, splitting into three versions of herself. The film itself freely associates and flips between these three narratives after Alice falls asleep in the staff toilets.

These dream versions of Alice and narrative strands are:

- Alice (Veronica Baleani) at the party she was just at, but in a distorted, unreal version of it.
- A sad shaven head Alice in a therapist's office, with a therapist who is trying to figure out why she made the call for help on social media.
- Alice in "Wonderland", the main protagonist for much of the film, Maria Vittoria Argenti, a braver version of the party Alice who has bizarre yet familiar adventures in a strange clinic, ruled over by a doctor called Queen. The film implies this world is reached at the bottom of a large sculptural hole, although Alice's descent into Wonderland is never shown.

== Production and release ==
The stage production was performed in various theatres from 2011 to 2013, by the company Compagnia teatrale Piccola Pietra, with a different cast to the film. The film was shot in Rome from 2016 to 2019, following crowdfunding completion. The scene where Alice realises she is at the bottom of a massive hole was filmed at Rampa Prenestina.

The film was released on Amazon Prime Video in various countries in 2021.

== Reception ==
The film has been described as an "interesting and suggestive travel inside the mind" and "a reflection on social suicide".

== Main cast ==
- Veronica Baleani and Maria Vittoria Argenti as Alice

Cast in the real world section:

- Martina Badiluzzi as Sorellalice (Alice's sister)
- Lucia Batassa as NonnAlice (Alice's grandmother)
- Marit Nissen as MammAlice (Alice's mother)
- Massimiliano Vado as Padre Alice (Alice's father)
- Tommaso Arnaldi as Dodo
- Roberta Stellato as Rosa

Characters in Alice's dreams:

- Gabriele Falsetta as Dr. Oreste
- Giacomo Bottoni as Biagio
- Salvatore Lanza as Nico
- Ilaria Gattafoni as Pin
- Silvia Gattafoni as Pam
- Teodoro Giambanco as Re
- Azzurra Rocchi as Cat
- Alessia Sala as Cosetta
- Ilenia Sbarufatti as Luce
- Riccardo Vianello as Cappello
- Sabrina Paravicini as Regina

== Festival selections and awards ==
=== Official Selection ===
- White Night Film Festival 2021 in Saint-Peterburg, Russia
- Kalakari Film Festival 2021
- NewDelhiFilmFestival 2021
- Festival del cinema di Cefalu, 2020

=== Awards ===
- Best Director, Best Feature, Cambio International Film Festival, Berlin, 2021.
- Best Experimental Foreign Feature, American Filmatic Arts Awards, 2020.
- Best Feature film, best director. Around film festival Amsterdam, 2020.
- Azzurra Rochi, best supporting actress, best feature film, Under the Stars international film festival, 2020.
- Best film, Global film festival awards, 2020
- Best Experimental feature, Dreammachine International film festival, 2020.
- Best editing, Montreal international wreath awards film festival
- Winner, Port Blair International film festival 2020.
- Best Editing and Best Photography at the Montreal Film Festival
- Lazio Critics Award
