= Alice Through the Looking Glass (1982 film) =

1982 Soviet animated film

- Алиса в Зазеркалье
- Based on: Through the Looking-Glass by Lewis Carroll
- Screenplay by: Evgeniy Zagdanskiy
- Directed by: Yefrem Pruzhanskiy
- Creative directors: Henrikh Umanskyi and Iryna Smyrnova
- Narrated by: Rostislav Plyatt
- Composer: Vladimir Bystryakov
- Country of origin: Soviet Union
- Original language: Russian

Production
- Running time: 38 minutes
- Production company: Kievnauchfilm

Original release
- Network: Soviet television system

Related
- Alice in Wonderland

Alice Through the Looking Glass (Russian: Алиса в Зазеркалье, romanized: Alisa v Zazerkale) is a 1982 Soviet fantasy comedy animated short film, based on Lewis Carroll's 1871 novel Through the Looking-Glass. The film is the sequel to the 1981 short film Alice in Wonderland and was produced by Kievnauchfilm and directed by Ephram Pruzhansky. It was narrated by a selection of the best Soviet actors at the time, including Rostislav Plyatt, Marina Neyolova (Alice), Nikolai Karachentsov, and Liya Akhedzhakova. The text mostly follows the Russian translation of the book by Nina Demurova (poems translated by Samuil Marshak), but it was shortened to fit to the 38 minutes duration.
