= Art Directors Guild Award for Excellence in Production Design for a Television Movie or Limited Series =

Television and movie award

The Art Directors Guild Award for Excellence in Production Design for a Television Movie or Limited Series is an award handed out annually by the Art Directors Guild. It was introduced at the Art Directors Guilds' second annual honors, in 1998, after being combined with regular series for the first annual awards.

== Winners and nominations ==
=== 1990s ===
Excellence in Production Design Award - Television

Year	Program	Nominees	Network
1996 (1st)
1996 (1st)	Star Trek: Deep Space Nine	Herman F. Zimmerman (production designer), Randall McIlvain (art director)	Syndication
1996 (1st)	Frasier	Roy Christopher (production designer), Wendell Johnson	NBC
1996 (1st)	Mrs. Santa Claus	Hub Braden (production designer), Mary Dodson (art director)	CBS
1996 (1st)	NYPD Blue	Richard C. Hankins (production designer), Alan E. Muraoka (art director), Lauren Crasco (assistant art director)	ABC
1996 (1st)	The Summer of Ben Tyler	Jan Scott (production designer), Tim Eckel (art director)	CBS

Excellence in Production Design Award - Television Movie or Mini-Series

Year	Program	Nominees	Network
1997 (2nd)
1997 (2nd)	George Wallace	Michael Z. Hanan (production designer), Charles M. Lagola (art director), Arlan Jay Vetter (assistant art director)	TNT
1997 (2nd)	Asteroid	Richard B. Lewis (production designer), Russell J. Smith (art director)	NBC
1997 (2nd)	Buffalo Soldiers	Michael Baugh (production designer)	TNT
1997 (2nd)	Deep Family Secrets	Jan Scott (production designer)	Lifetime
1997 (2nd)	House of Frankenstein	Curtis A. Schnell (production designer); Michael L. Fox, Colin D. Irwin (art directors); Victor Ortado (art director)	NBC
1998 (3rd)
1998 (3rd)	From the Earth to the Moon	Richard Toyon (production designer), Kitty Doris-Bates (supervising art director), Seth Reed (art director)	HBO
1998 (3rd)	Gia	David J. Bomba (production designer), John R. Jensen (art director)	HBO
1998 (3rd)	Houdini	Jerry Wanek (production designer), John Bucklin (art director), Maia Javan (visual consultant)	TNT
1998 (3rd)	The Rat Pack	Hilda Stark (production designer), Kathleen M. McKernin (art director)	HBO
1998 (3rd)	Winchell	Marcia Hinds (production designer), Bo Johnson (art director)	HBO
1999 (4th)
1999 (4th)	Introducing Dorothy Dandridge	James H. Spencer (production designer), A. Leslie Thomas (art director), Kristen Pratt (assistant art director)	HBO
1999 (4th)	The Hunley	Roy Forge Smith (production designer), Michael Rizzo (art director)	TNT
1999 (4th)	Lansky	Jerry Wanek (production designer), John Bucklin (art director), Maia Javan (visual consultant)	HBO
1999 (4th)	P.T. Barnum	Paul Peters (production designer); Raymond Dupuis, Eric Fraser, Jean Kazemirchuk (art directors); Jean-Andre Carriere (assistant art director)	A&E
1999 (4th)	The '60s	Vincent Jefferds (production designer), Dawn Snyder (art director)	NBC

=== 2000s ===
Year	Program	Nominees	Network
2000 (5th)
2000 (5th)	The '70s	John T. Walker (production designer), Ron Mason (art director)	NBC
2000 (5th)	American Tragedy	Michael Baugh (production designer), Jack G. Taylor Jr. (art director)	CBS
2000 (5th)	The Beach Boys: An American Family	Michael Baugh (production designer)	ABC
2000 (5th)	Enslavement: The True Story of Fanny Kemble	Eric Fraser (production designer), Astra Burka (art director)	Showtime
2000 (5th)	For Love or Country: The Arturo Sandoval Story	Charles C. Bennett (production designer), Cece Destefano (art director), Nicholas Scott (assistant art director)	HBO
2001 (6th)
2001 (6th)	The Last Brickmaker in America	William J. Creber (production designer), Jim Gloster (art director)	CBS
2001 (6th)	Blonde	Bernard Hides (production designer); Bernadette Wynack, Sally Shepherd, Thomas P. Wilkins (art directors)	CBS
2001 (6th)	Dinner with Friends	Peter S. Larkin (production designer)	HBO
2001 (6th)	Jackie, Ethel, Joan: The Women of Camelot	Curtis A. Schnell (production designer)	NBC
2001 (6th)	On Golden Pond	Eugene Lee (production designer)	CBS
2002 (7th)
2002 (7th)	Live from Baghdad	Richard Hoover (production designer); Matthew C. Jacobs, Karen Steward (art directors); Jay Durrwachter (assistant art director)	HBO
2002 (7th)	Martin and Lewis	Roy Forge Smith (production designer), Brendan Smith (art director)	CBS
2002 (7th)	Master Spy: The Robert Hanssen Story	Michael Baugh (production designer), Greg Chown (art director), David Chevalier (assistant art director)	CBS
2002 (7th)	Path to War	Waldemar Kalinowski (production designer), Scott Meehan (art director)	HBO
2002 (7th)	Taken	Chris Gorak (production designer), Michael N. Wong (art director)	Syfy
2003 (8th)
2003 (8th)	Angels in America	Stuart Wurtzel (production designer); John Kasarda, Stefano Maria Ortolani (art directors); Hinju Kim, David Stein, Tom Warren (assistant art directors)	HBO
2003 (8th)	Helen of Troy	James Allen, Miljen Kreka Kljakovic (production designers); Bill Brownell, Masako Masuda, Branimir Babic, Ino Bonello, Adam O'Neal (art directors)	USA
2003 (8th)	Hitler: The Rise of Evil	Marek Dobrowolski (production designer); Albrecht Konrad, Martin Martinec (art directors); Ales Cepelka, David Vondrasek, Rudolf Kinský, Ludek Minarik (assistant art directors)	CBS
2003 (8th)	Napoléon	Richard Cunin (production designer); Lionel Acat, Pierre Michon (art directors); Xavier Lemesnil (assistant art director)	A&E
2003 (8th)	The Reagans	Barbara Dunphy (production designer), Sylvain Gingras (art director), Eric Dostaler (assistant art director)	Showtime
2004 (9th)
2004 (9th)	And Starring Pancho Villa as Himself	Herbert Pinter (production designer), Bernardo Trujillo (art director), Gian Fabio Bosco (assistant art director)	HBO
2004 (9th)	Back When We Were Grownups	Cynthia Kay Charette (production designer), Thomas T. Taylor (art director)	CBS
2004 (9th)	3: The Dale Earnhardt Story	Michael Baugh (production designer), Jim Gloster (art director)	ESPN
2005 (10th)
2005 (10th)	Empire Falls	Stuart Wurtzel (production designer); John Kasarda (art director); David Stein, Tom Warren (assistant art directors)	HBO
2005 (10th)	Into the West	Marek Dobrowolski (production designer); Guy Barnes, Rick Roberts (art directors); Jackie Bagley, Janet Lakeman, Amy Morrison, James F. Oberlander (assistant art directors)	TNT
2005 (10th)	The Magic of Ordinary Days	Clark Hunter (production designer), Andrew Moreau (art director)	CBS
2005 (10th)	Warm Springs	Sarah Knowles (production designer); Thomas Minton, Scott Ritenour (art directors)	HBO
2006 (11th)
2006 (11th)	Stephen King's Desperation	Phil Dagort (production designer), Jason Weil (art director)	ABC
2006 (11th)	The Lost Room	Keith Neely (production designer); Guy Barnes, Rosario Provenza (art director)	Syfy
2006 (11th)	Return to Halloweentown	Edward L. Rubin (production designer)	Disney Channel
2007 (12th)
2007 (12th)	Pu-239	Tom Meyer (production designer); Christian Niculescu (supervising art director); Adrian Curelea, Sorin Popescu (art directors); Andreea Gherghel, Kalina Krasteva, Grigore Puscariu, Monica Timofte (assistant art directors)	HBO
2007 (12th)	The Company	Marek Dobrowolski (production designer); Anastasia Masaro, Alan E. Muraoka, Malcolm Stone (supervising art directors); Zsuzsanna Borvendég, William A. Cimino, László Rajk, Csaba Stork (art directors); Sylvain Bombardier, Arlene Lott, Matt Middleton, Dan Norton (first assistant art directors)	TNT
2007 (12th)	The Starter Wife	Tracey Gallacher (production designer), Brian Edmonds (art director), Michelle McGahey (assistant art director)	USA
2008 (13th)
2008 (13th)	John Adams	Gemma Jackson (production designer); David Crank, Christina Moore (supervising art directors); John P. Goldsmith, Tibor Lázár (art directors); Dan Kuchar, Michael H. Ward (assistant art directors); Ted Haigh (graphic designer); Richard Salinas (lead scenic); Kathy Lucas (set decorator U.S.A.); Sarah Whittle (set decorator Hungary)	HBO
2008 (13th)	The Andromeda Strain	Jerry Wanek (production designer); Dan Hermansen, John Marcynuk (art directors); Doug Girling (assistant art director); Merlin Dervisevic (set decorator)	A&E
2008 (13th)	The Librarian: Curse of the Judas Chalice	Robb Wilson King (production designer); Michael H. Ward, Christina Eunji Kim (art directors); Sarah Forrest, Wright McFarland (assistant art directors); Derek Wentworth (illustrator); Michael T. Daigle (lead scenic artist); Roger Johnson (graphic artist); Luci Leary (set decorator)	TNT
2008 (13th)	Lone Rider	Yuda Acco (production designer); Kathleen McCarthy (set decorator)	
2008 (13th)	Recount	Patti Podesta (production designer); Christopher Tandon (art director); Kim Lincoln (graphic artist); Herman McEachin, John E. Thombleson II (scenic artists); Anuradha Mehta (set decorator)	HBO
2009 (14th)
2009 (14th)	Grey Gardens	Kalina Ivanov (production designer), Brandt Gordon (art director), Colin Woods (assistant art director), Tucker Doherty (set designer), Jason Clarke (graphic designer), Jeff Helgason (scenic artist), Jean Sanders (set decorator)	HBO
2009 (14th)	Ben 10: Alien Swarm	Yuda Acco (production designer), Harry Matheu (art director), Hugh D.G. Moody (set designer), Robb Bihun (storyboard artist), Ann Stacy (scenic artist), Dan Post (set decorator)	Cartoon Network
2009 (14th)	The Prisoner	Michael Pickwoad (production designer); Claudio Campana, Delarey Wagenar (art directors); Emilia Roux (assistant art director); Delia de Villiers Minnaar (set decorator)	AMC

=== 2010s ===
Year	Program	Episode(s)	Nominees	Network
2010 (15th)
2010 (15th)	Secrets in the Walls		Robb Wilson King (production designer), Nelson Anderson (art director), Steven Maes (graphic designer), Sandhya Huchingson (set decorator)	Lifetime Movie Network
2010 (15th)	Revenge of the Bridesmaids		Marcia Hinds (production designer); Kristin Lekki, John Sanchez (art directors); Trinh Vu (graphic designer); Sue Ford (scenic artist); Ellen Brill (set decorator)	ABC Family
2011 (16th)
2011 (16th)	Mildred Pierce		Mark Friedberg (production designer); Deborah Jensen, Peter Rogness (art directors); Kim Jennings (assistant art director); Michael Auszura (set designer); I. Javier Ameijeiras (illustrator); Mark Pollard (graphic designer); Don Nace (scenic artist); Ellen Christiansen (set decorator)	HBO
2011 (16th)	The Bling Ring		Robb Wilson King (production designer), Steven Maes (art director), Linda Spheeris (set decorator)	Lifetime
2011 (16th)	Cinema Verite		Patti Podesta (production designer); Dawn Masi, Christopher Tandon (art directors); Philip Toolin (set designer); Martin Charles, Eric Rosenberg (graphic designers); Meg Everist, James V. Kent (set decorators)	HBO
2011 (16th)	The Hour		Eve Stewart (production designer); Beverley Gerard, Leon McCarthy (art directors); Amy Merry (graphic artist); Heather Gordon (assistant graphic artist); Julia Castle (set decorator)	BBC America
2011 (16th)	Too Big to Fail		Bob Shaw (production designer), Miguel López-Castillo (art director), Katya Blumenberg (assistant art director), Larry M. Gruber (set director); Holly Watson (graphic designer), Peter Hackman (scenic artist), Carol Silverman (set decorator)	HBO
2012 (17th)
2012 (17th)	American Horror Story: Asylum	"I Am Anne Frank, Part 2"	Mark Worthington (production designer), Andrew Murdock (art director), Phil Dagort (set designer), Ellen Brill (set decorator)	FX
2012 (17th)	Game Change		Michael Corenblith (production designer), Samantha Avila (assistant art director), Kuo Pao Lian (set designer), Kenneth Roman (graphic designer), Francesca Gerlach (scenic artist), Tiffany Zappulla (set decorator)	HBO
2012 (17th)	Hatfields & McCoys		Derek R. Hill (production designer); Serban Porupca, John B. Vertrees (art directors); Grigore Puscariu, Vlad Roseanu (assistant art directors); Aniela Ban, Radu Ciocanau, Elena Ioana, (set designers); Sally Black (set decorator)	History
2012 (17th)	Hemingway & Gellhorn		Geoffrey Kirkland (production designer); Nanci Noblett (art director); William Beck, Gerard Howland (set designer); Jim Erickson (set decorator)	HBO
2012 (17th)	Mockingbird Lane		Michael Wylie (production designer); Elizabeth Hershberger Gray (art director); Jonathan Carlos (assistant art director); Martha Johnston, Karl J. Martin, Steven M. Saylor, Robert Sissman (set directors); William Eliscu, Kim Papazian (graphic designers); Halina Siwolop (set decorator)	NBC
2013 (18th)
2013 (18th)	Behind the Candelabra		Howard Cummings (production designer); Patrick M. Sullivan (art director); Eric R. Johnson (assistant art director); Karen TenEyck (graphic designer); Thomas Machan (model maker); John Berger, Greg Berry, Eric Sundahl (set designers); Barbara Munch (set decorator)	HBO
2013 (18th)	American Horror Story: Coven	"Bitchcraft"	Mark Worthington (production designer); Andrew Murdock (art director); Michelle C. Harmon (assistant art director); Molly Mikula, Adele Plauche, Walter Schneider, Brian A. Waits (set designers); Ellen Brill (set decorator)	FX
2013 (18th)	Bonnie & Clyde	"Part 1" and "Part 2"	Derek R. Hill (production designer), Sean Ryan Jennings (art director), Ellen King (graphic designer), Samuel Froeschle (set designer), Phil Shirey (set decorator)	A&E, History, Lifetime
2013 (18th)	Mob City	"A Guy Walks Into a Bar" and "Reason to Kill a Man"	Gregory S. Melton (production designer); Alex Hajdu (art director); Geoffrey Mandel (graphic designer); Dorit Hurst, W. Rick Nichol, Thomas T. Taylor, John B. Vertrees (set designers); Melissa M. Levander (set decorator)	TNT
2013 (18th)	Phil Spector		Patrizia von Brandenstein (production designer), Fredda Slavin (art director), Jeremy Rosenstein (assistant art director), Scott Purcell (graphic designer), Diane Lederman (set decorator)	HBO
2014 (19th)
2014 (19th)	American Horror Story: Freak Show	"Massacres and Matinees"	Mark Worthington (production designer), James F. Truesdale (art director), Brian A. Waits (set designer), Jane Fitts (graphic designer), Cynthia Anne Slagter (set decorator)	FX
2014 (19th)	Cosmos: A Spacetime Odyssey	"Unafraid of the Dark"	Seth Reed (production designer), John B. Josselyn (art director)	Fox, Nat Geo
2014 (19th)	Fargo	"The Crocodile's Dilemma"	John Blackie, Warren Alan Young (production designers); Bill Ives, Trevor Smith (art director); Cathy Cowan (assistant art director); Craig Humphries (graphic designer); Paul Healy, Shirley Inget (set decorators)	FX
2014 (19th)	Houdini	"Part 1" and "Part 2"	Patrizia von Brandenstein (production designer); Tibor Lázár, Marton Voros (art directors); Melanie J. Baker (set decorator)	History
2014 (19th)	Sherlock	"His Last Vow"	Arwel Jones (production designer), Dafydd Shurmer (art director), Christina Tom (graphic designer), Steven Fudge (scenic artist), Hannah Nicholson (set decorator)	PBS
2015 (20th)
2015 (20th)	American Horror Story: Hotel	"Checking In"	Mark Worthington (production designer); Denise Hudson (art director); Kevin Houlihan (assistant art director); Phil Dagort, Kristen Davis, Ron Mason, Lauren E. Polizzi, Thomas T. Taylor (set designer); David Eckert, Darcy Prevost (model makers); Robert Bernard, Jane Fitts (graphic designer), Ellen Brill (set decorator)	FX
2015 (20th)	Bessie		Clark Hunter (production designer), Drew Monahan (art director), Carrie Gale (graphic designer), Traci Kirshbaum (set decorator)	HBO
2015 (20th)	Fargo	"Waiting for Dutch", "Before the Law" and "Fear and Trembling"	Warren Alan Young (production designer); Bill Ives, Elisabeth Williams (art directors); Evan Spence (set designer); Jackie Bagley, Jennifer Bain, Marie Massolin, Ty Semaka (graphic designers); Crystal Husum (scenic artist); Shirley Inget (set decorator)	FX
2015 (20th)	Tut		Michael Z. Hanan (production designer); David Ensley (supervising art director); Cinzia Lo Fazio (art director); Abdellah Baadil (assistant art director); Marc'Antonio Brandolini, Paolo Dore, Ricardo Monti (set designers); Michele Brunetti, Khabouiz Tarik (model makers); Claudio Cosentino, Briseide Siciliano (concept artists); Malcolm Stone (set decorator)	Spike
2015 (20th)	Wolf Hall	"Three Card Trick"	Pat Campbell (production designer), Frederic Evard (art director), Jo Watkinson (graphic designer), Elaine McLenachan (set decorator)	PBS
2016 (21st)
2016 (21st)	The Night Of	"The Beach"	Patrizia von Brandenstein (production designer), Fredda Slavin (art director), Bobby Berg (assistant art director), Hudson Meredith (graphic designer), Peter Hackman (scenic artist), Melanie J. Baker (set decorator)	HBO
2016 (21st)	American Horror Story: Roanoke	"Chapter 4"	Andrew Murdock (production designer); Scott Cobb, Eric Sundahl (art directors); Nathan W. Bailey (assistant art director); Easton Smith (set designer); Jamie Rama (illustrator); Jane Fitts (graphic designer); Kathy Orlando (set decorator)	FX
2016 (21st)	Black Mirror	"Nosedive", "Playtest" and "San Junipero"	Joel Collins, James Foster, Nick Palmer (production designers); Shane Bunce, Robyn Paiba (supervising art directors); Greg Cleaver, Nick Dent (art directors); Glen Young (assistant art director); Glenn Haddock (model maker); Sammy Khalid (matte artist); Erica McEwan (graphic designer); Gemma Kingsley (graphic artist); Rafael Martin Coronel (concept artist); Daniel May (digital set designer); Justin Hutchinson-Chatburn (previs artist); Katie Spencer (set decorator)	Netflix
2016 (21st)	The People v. O. J. Simpson: American Crime Story	"100% Not Guilty", "Marcia, Marcia, Marcia" and "Manna from Heaven"	Jeffrey Mossa (production designer), Scott Cobb (art director), Betty Krul (set designer), Lori West (graphic designer); Amber Haley (set decorator)	FX
2016 (21st)	Sherlock	"The Abominable Bride"	Arwel Jones (production designer), Dafydd Shurmer (art director), Steven Fudge (scenic artist), Hannah Nicholson (set decorator)	PBS
2017 (22nd)
2017 (22nd)	Black Mirror	"USS Callister"	Joel Collins, Phil Sims (production designers); Robyn Paiba (supervising art director); Alex Morgan, David Weare (art directors); Glen Young (assistant art director); Erica McEwan, Sophie Powell (graphic artists); Jon Horsham (digital model maker); Ian Bunting (digital set maker); Kate Beckly (set decorator)	Netflix
2017 (22nd)	American Horror Story: Cult	"Election Night" and "Winter of Our Discontent"	Jeffrey Mossa (production designer), Rachel Robb Kondrath (art director), Maren Brown (assistant art director), Betty Krul (set designer), Lori West (graphic designer), Mike Stassi (digital set designer), Claire Kaufman (set decorator)	FX
2017 (22nd)	Big Little Lies	"Somebody's Dead ", "Living the Dream" and "You Get What You Need"	John Paino (production designers), James F. Truesdale (art director), Joseph Feld (assistant art director), David Meyer (illustrator), Jane Fitts (set designer), Amy Wells (set decorator)	HBO
2017 (22nd)	Fargo	"The Law of Vacant Places", "The Narrow Escape Problem" and "Who Rules the Land of Denial?"	Elisabeth Williams (production designer); Bill Ives, Larry Spittle (art directors); Marie Massolin (assistant art director); Evan Spence (set designer); Melissa Neumiller, Ty Semaka (graphic designers); Al Berg (storyboard artist); Darlene Lewis (set decorator)	FX
2017 (22nd)	Feud: Bette and Joan	"Pilot", "And the Winner Is... (The Oscars of 1963)" and "You Mean All This Time We Could Have Been Friends? "	Judy Becker (production designer); Jamie Walker McCall (art director); Alec Contestabile, Steven Light-Orr, Rose Youmans (assistant art directors); Carol Bentley, Joseph Feld, Jim Hewitt (set designers); Jeff L. Lee (graphic designer); Anne Hyvarinen (scenic artist); Florencia Martin (set decorator)	FX
2018 (22nd)
2018 (22nd)	The Alienist	"The Boy on the Bridge"	Mara LePere-Schloop (production designer); Bill Crutcher, Karl Probert (supervising art director); Zsuzsanna Borvendeg, Rob Cowper, Andres Cubillan, Bence Erdélyi, Biljana Jovanovic, Gergely Rieger, James Truesdale (art directors); Claudio Campana, Borbala Debreczeni, Craig Gilroy, Rumiko Ishii, Gergely Kukucska, Daniel Miklos, Kristóf Pataricza, Levente Sulyok, Beata Vavrinecz, Chris Yoo (assistant art directors); Noelle King, Molly Mikula, Adele Plauche, Nicole Reed, Trinh Vu (set designers); Gemma Kingsley, Agnes Maza, Karolina Pinter, James Stanes (graphic designers); Gabor Szabo (digital set designer); Vincent Morin (concept artist); Linda Bándi, Laszlo Tibor Erdelyi, Sandor Gabor Jani (draughtsmen); Zsolt Gyula Ilia (graphic artist); Julian Scalia (model maker); Alice Baker, Philip Murphy, Adam Polgar, Zsuzsanna Sipos, Holly Thurman (set decorators)	TNT
2018 (22nd)	American Horror Story: Apocalypse	"Fire and Reign"	Valdar Wilt (production designer), Mark Taylor (art director), Maren Brown (assistant art director), Betty Krul (set designer), Simon Jones (graphic designer), Ryan Watson (set decorator)	FX
2018 (22nd)	The Assassination of Gianni Versace: American Crime Story	"The Man Who Would Be Vogue", "Manhunt" and "House by the Lake"	Judy Becker (production designer); Jamie Walker McCall (art director); Alexander Elsesser Linde, Rose Youmans (assistant art directors); Florencia Martin (set decorator)	FX
2018 (22nd)	Maniac	"Utangatta"	Alex Digerlando (production designer); Anu Schwartz (supervising art director); Audra Avery (art director); Rumiko Ishii, Jonathan Mosca, Blythe Quinlan, Nithya Shrinivasan (assistant art directors); Adam Brustein, Andrea Burrell, Zach Zirlin (graphic artists); Kristopher Layng, Hugh Sicotte (concept artists); Patrick Campbell (storyboard artist); Lucy Abrams, Bob Barnett, Stephen Barth, Philippe Belhachie, Ales Brodsky, Mark Connor, Miguel Dejesus, Max Grafe, Chris Kay, Lisa Kennedy, Elizabeth Linn, Penko Platikanov, Vitaly Timergaleev (scenic artists); Lydia Marks (set decorator)	Netflix
2018 (22nd)	Sharp Objects	"Vanish", "Closer" and "Milk"	John Paino (production designer); Austin Gorg (art director); Wes Hottman (assistant art director); Steven Light-Orr, Tom Taylor (set designers); Jason Perrine (graphic designer); Joanna Bush (concept artist); Amy Wells (set decorator)	HBO
2019 (24th)
2019 (24th)	Chernobyl		Luke Hull (production designers); Karen Wakefield (supervising art director); Paulius Dascioras, Ainis Jankauskas, Max Klaentschi (art directors); Lina Geciene (assistant art director); Anita Dhillon, Neil Floyd (graphic artists); Tomas Jankauskas (graphic artist); Elo Soode (concept artist); Claire Levinson Gendler (set decorator)	HBO
2019 (24th)	Black Mirror	"Striking Vipers"	Annie Beauchamp (production designer); Charlie Ravai (supervising art director); Vera Hamburger (art director); Gabriel Garcia, Aline Leonello (assistant art directors); Izabel Rainer (graphic artist); Liam Beck (concept artist)	Netflix
2019 (24th)	Catch-22		David Gropman (production designer); Karen Schulz Gropman, Alexandro Santucci (supervising art directors); Gianpaolo Rifino, Brieseide Siciliano (art directors); Marco Furbatto, Massimo Pauletto (assistant art directors); Silvia Colafranceschi, Dario Nolè (set designers); Silvia Fontana (graphic artist); Marco Torresin (illustrator); Emanuele Pellegrino (model maker); David Orlandelli (storyboard artist); Anna Pinnock, Alessandra Querzola (set decorators)	Hulu
2019 (24th)	Deadwood: The Movie		Maria Caso (production designer); Jason Garner, David Potts (art directors); Robert Broadfoot, Jeff Ozimek (set designers); Craig Ruda (graphic artist); Brent Cottrell-Mannon (set decorator)	HBO
2019 (24th)	Fosse/Verdon		Alex Digerlando (production designer); Anu Schwartz (supervising art director); Julia Heymans (art director); Jeremy W. Foil, Ryan Heck, Jonathan Mosca, Blythe R.D. Quinlan, Abby J. Smith (set designers); Andrea Burrell, Holly Watson, Jeremy Wong (graphic designers); Patrick Campbell (storyboard artist); Alex Gorodetsky, Ron Gottschalk, Jay Hendrickx, Brian Lynch, Quang Nguyen, Katherine Rondeau, Anne Marie Ryan, Tim Tranzillo (scenic artists); Lydia Marks (set decorator)	FX

=== 2020s ===
Year	Program	Episode(s)	Nominees	Network
2020 (25th)
2020 (25th)	The Queen's Gambit		Uli Hanisch (production designer); Kai Karla Koch (supervising art director); Daniel Chour, Thorsten Klein (art directors); Laura Lessnick, Leonie Lieberherr, Sarah Wibbeler (assistant art directors); Laura Bach, Simon Drews (set designers); Raymond Boy (storyboard artist); Thomas Möhring (concept artist); Mieke Casal (scenic artist); Jan Hülpüsch, Daniel Porsdorf (graphic designers); Sabine Schaaf (set decorator)	Netflix
2020 (25th)	The Alienist: Angel of Darkness		Ruth Ammon (production designer); Stephan Gessler, Michael Allen Glover (supervising art directors); Rob Cowper (senior art director); Josef Bradnl, Michael Fissneider, Marco Furbatto, Glen Hall, Alex Santucci, Esther Schreiner, Alessandro Troso, Márton Vörös (art directors); Gergely Papp (standby art director); Borbála Debreczeni, Claudia Granucci, Ákos Mihályi, Levente Sulyok (assistant art directors); Anna Döbrössy, Celina Hollaender, Franciska Nagy, Marvell Nardai, Nedda Négyessey, Neno Pecur, Serban Rotatiu, Zsófia Telek, Stefanie Übelhör (set designers); Szandra Riemer (model maker); Annie Atkins, Adam Tankell (graphic designers); Silvia Fontana, Zsolt Ilia, Tamás Pál (assistant graphic designers); Missy Parker (set decorator)	TNT
2020 (25th)	Fargo		Warren Alan Young (production designer); Helen Harwell (supervising art director); Jessie Haddad, Martha Sparrow (art directors); Courtney Koller, Toi Whitaker (assistant art directors); Arifa Chand, Kristen Davis, Rick Nichol, Sharon Samuels (set designers); Dwayne Burgess (illustrator); Audrey Zaldumbide (graphic designer); Camellia Cox (graphic artist); Chuck Potter (set decorator)	FX
2020 (25th)	Hollywood		Matthew Flood Ferguson (production designer); Eric Sundahl, Mark R. Taylor (art directors); Natalie Gates, Gary McMonnies (assistant art directors); Carol Bentley, David Chow, Cosmas Demetriou, Jann Engel, David Moreau, Colin Sieburgh, Mindi Toback (set designers); Hilary Ament, Trey Shaffer (graphic designers); Melissa Licht (set decorator)	Netflix
2020 (25th)	Little Fires Everywhere		Jessica Kender (production designer); Brian Grego (art director); AJ Cisneros, Jubilate Cox, Shengxin Jin, Morgan Lindsey(assistant art directors); Arthur Chadwick, Kelly Hogan, Rhea Rebbe (set designers); Steven Milosavleski, Kim Icenhower Papazian, Vanessa Riegel (graphic designers); Lisa Clark (set decorator)	Hulu
