= Art Directors Guild Lifetime Achievement Award =

ADG Lifetime Achievement Awardees

The ADG Lifetime Achievement Award is awarded to individuals who are outstanding in each of the guild's four crafts.

The guild's four crafts are, Art Directors; Scenic, Title and Graphic Artists; Illustrators and Matte Artists; and Set Designers and Model Makers.

== Recipients ==
Year	Winner	Ref
1996	Robert F. Boyle	
1998	Henry Bumstead	
1999	Harold Michelson	
2001	Jan Scott	
2002	Albert Brenner	
2002	Sir Ken Adam	
2004	William J. Creber	
2005	John B. Mansbridge	
2006	Dean Tavoularis	
2007	Stuart Craig	
2009	Paul Sylbert	
2010	Terence Marsh	
2012	Patricia Norris	
2012	Tony Walton	
2013	Herman Zimmerman	
2014	Camille Abbott	
2014	Jim Bissell	
2014	John P. Bruce	
2014	Rick Carter	
2014	Will Ferrell	
2015	Bill Anderson	
2015	Harrison Ellenshaw	
2015	Patrizia Von Brandenstein	
2016	Cate Bangs	
2017	Albert Obregon	
2017	Joseph Musso	
2017	Rene Lagler	
2017	William J. Newmon II	
2018	James J. Murakami	
2018	John Moffitt	
2018	Marty Kline	
2018	Norm Newberry	
2019	Joe Alves	
2019	Denis Olsen	
2019	Stephen Berger	
2019	Jack Johnson	
2020	John Eaves	
2020	Patrick DeGreve	
2020	Martha Johnson	
2020	Stuart Wurtzel	
2021	Ida Random	
2022	Michael Denering	
2023	David Lowery, Greg Papalia, Wynn P. Thomas, Francine West	
2024	Lisa Frazza, Barbara Mesney, Dan Sweetman, J. Dennis Washington	

== See also ==
- Art Directors Guild
- ADG Excellence in Production Design Award
- Art Directors Guild Hall of Fame
