= Art Directors Guild Awards 1996 =

Annual US film and television awards ceremony

1st Art Directors Guild Awards
- Date: 1997

The 1st Art Directors Guild Excellence in Production Design Awards, honoring the best production designers in film, television and media of 1996, were held in 1997.

== Winners and nominees ==
=== Film ===
Excellence in Production Design Award – Feature Film

The English Patient – Stuart Craig, Aurelio Crugnola

- The Birdcage – Bo Welch, Tom Duffield, John Dexter
- The Crucible – Lilly Kilvert, John Warnke
- Hamlet – Tim Harvey, Desmond Crowe
- Mars Attacks! – Wynn Thomas, James Hegedus, John Dexter, Jann K. Engel, Richard Fernandez

=== Television ===
Excellence in Production Design Award – Television

Star Trek: Deep Space Nine – Herman F. Zimmerman, Randall McIlvain

- Frasier – Roy Christopher, Wendell Johnson
- Mrs. Santa Claus – Hub Braden, Mary Dodson
- NYPD Blue – Richard C. Hankins, Alan E. Muraoka, Lauren Crasco
- The Summer of Ben Tyler – Jan Scott, Tim Eckel

=== Special Achievement Award ===
- Gene Allen

=== Distinguished Career Award ===
- Allen Daviau

=== Lifetime Achievement Award ===
- Robert F. Boyle
