= Art Directors Guild Award for Excellence in Production Design for a TV series =

The Art Directors Guild Award for Outstanding Production Design for a Half Hour Single-Camera Television Series was an award handed out annually by the Art Directors Guild. It was introduced at the Art Directors Guilds' 1st annual honors in 1996. The award was given until 1999, after which it was subsequently split into single-camera and multi-camera categories beginning with the 2000 ADG Awards.

== Winners and nominees ==
Year	Program	Episode(s)	Nominees	Network
1996 (1st)
1996 (1st)	Star Trek: Deep Space Nine		Herman F. Zimmerman (production designer), Randall McIlvain (art director)	Syndication
1996 (1st)	Frasier		Roy Christopher (production designer), Wendell Johnson	NBC
1996 (1st)	Mrs. Santa Claus		Hub Braden (production designer), Mary Dodson (art director)	CBS
1996 (1st)	NYPD Blue		Richard C. Hankins (production designer), Alan E. Muraoka (art director), Lauren Crasco (assistant art director)	ABC
1996 (1st)	The Summer of Ben Tyler		Jan Scott (production designer), Tim Eckel (art director)	CBS
1997 (2nd)
1997 (2nd)	Brooklyn South		Paul Eads (production designer), Lee Mayman (art director)	CBS
1997 (2nd)	Babylon 5		John Iacovelli (production designer), Mark Walters (art director), Julie Aldedice-Rae (assistant art director)	PTEN
1997 (2nd)	Frasier		Roy Christopher (production designer), Richard Fernandez (art director)	NBC
1997 (2nd)	Nothing Sacred		Michael Baugh (production designer), Cate Bangs (art director)	ABC
1997 (2nd)	Star Trek: Voyager		Richard James (production designer); Louise Dorton, Leslie Parsons (art directors)	UPN
1998 (3rd)
1998 (3rd)	The X-Files		Corey Kaplan (production designer); Sandy Getzler, Lauren E. Polizzi (art directors); Kevin Kavanaugh (assistant art director)	Fox
1998 (3rd)	Buddy Faro		Tom Walsh (production designer), Kim Hix (art director)	CBS
1998 (3rd)	Seven Days		Carol Winstead Wood (production designer); Eric Orbom, Greg Weimerskirch (art directors); Beala Neel (assistant art director)	UPN
1998 (3rd)	Sports Night		Thomas Azzari (production designer)	ABC
1998 (3rd)	Star Trek: Voyager		Richard James (production designer), Louise Dorton (art director)	UPN
1999 (4th)
1999 (4th)	The West Wing	"Pilot"	Jon Hutman (production designer), Tony Fanning (art director)	NBC
1999 (4th)	The Magnificent Seven	"Chinatown"	Jerry Wanek (production designer), John Bucklin (art director)	CBS
1999 (4th)	Roswell	"Monsters"	Vincent Jefferds (production designer), Dawn Snyder (art director),	The WB
1999 (4th)	Star Trek: Voyager	"11:59"	Richard James (production designer), Louise Dorton (art director)	UPN
1999 (4th)	The X-Files	"The Sixth Extinction II: Amor Fati"	Corey Kaplan (production designer); Phil Dagort, Sandy Getzler (art directors); Steven R. Miller (assistant art director)	Fox
