= Syd Mead =

American concept artist (1933–2019)

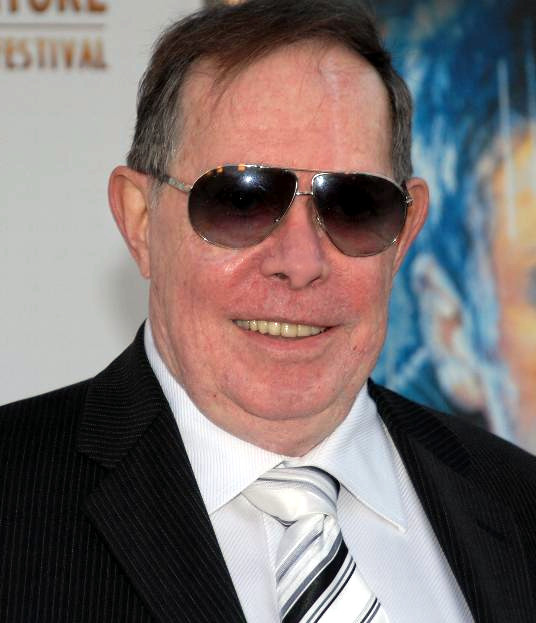
- Mead in 2007
- Born: Sydney Jay Mead; July 18, 1933; Saint Paul, Minnesota, U.S.
- Died: December 30, 2019 (aged 86); Pasadena, California, U.S.
- Education: Art Center School
- Occupation: Industrial designer
- Years active: 1959–2019
- Known for: Designs for Blade Runner, Tron, Aliens, 2010, and Star Trek: The Motion Picture
- Spouse: Roger Servick (m. 2016)
- Awards: Inkpot Award (1989) National Design Award (2006) William Cameron Menzies Award (2020)

Sydney Jay Mead (July 18, 1933 – December 30, 2019) was an American artist, illustrator, industrial designer, and neo-futurist concept artist whose renderings of future cities, vehicles and technologies shaped the visual language of modern futurism and late twentieth-century science fiction.

Born in Saint Paul, Minnesota, Mead graduated from the Art Center School in Los Angeles in 1959 and joined Ford Motor Company's Advanced Styling Studio, leaving after roughly two years for a commission from U.S. Steel to portray steel as a material of the future. The five volumes he illustrated for the company were circulated and collected widely across industrial and educational circles, resulting in a transformation in his practice from mere transportation design to broad-scale applied futurism across a variety of disciplines.

In 1970, Mead founded Syd Mead, Inc., which remained the vehicle for the rest of his career. His work ranged across consumer products, technology, architecture, aeronautics, astronautics, sea craft, automotive, technology, immersive entertainment, and interactive/video games. Mead principally painted in gouache throughout his career, and maintained an independent art practice.

Mead worked on his first feature film in 1979, at the age of 45, when he designed the alien entity in Star Trek: The Motion Picture. Commissions followed on Blade Runner and Tron in 1982, followed by more than a dozen additional films including 2010, Aliens, Short Circuit, Elysium, and Blade Runner 2049.

His designs have been cited as formative by filmmakers, industrial designers and architects, and his work has been exhibited at institutions including the Whitney Museum of American Art and the Academy Museum of Motion Pictures. He received the National Design Award in 2006, and the Art Directors Guild awarded him the William Cameron Menzies Award posthumously in 2020.

Mead coined the job title "visual futurist" for his screen credit on Blade Runner, and used it thereafter. He has been described as "the artist who illustrates the future" and "one of the most influential concept artists and industrial designers of our time."

== Early life and education ==
Mead was born on July 18, 1933, in Saint Paul, Minnesota. His father, Kenneth, was a Baptist minister who was also a painter and art instructor, having pursued a master's degree in art history from Sioux Falls College. Mead's own early drawings were the subject of his father's thesis on creativity in children. Films were not permitted in the household until Mead was thirteen, but Mead's father read him family friendly editions of Buck Rogers and Flash Gordon stories before Mead could read.

The family moved frequently between ministerial postings in Minnesota, South Dakota, Iowa and Colorado. Mead sold his first artwork in the fifth grade, selling drawings to schoolmates for a quarter each. While in high school in Colorado Springs, Colorado, he was introduced to the science-fiction writer Robert A. Heinlein at Heinlein's home by a local physician for whom he had done illustration work.

Mead graduated from high school in Colorado Springs in 1951. He took a night-shift job at the Alexander Film Company, which produced advertising trailers for cinemas, and was promoted to cel inker after the studio's art director noticed his work. He simultaneously enrolled in day classes at Colorado College. To preempt selection via the draft, Mead volunteered for the U.S. Army, serving his enlistment in the U.S. Army Corps of Engineers from 1953 to 1956. He spent part of his tour on Okinawa, where he was a company training sergeant. While stationed there, he continued to draw vehicles and sent examples to John Reinhart, then-chief designer for the Continental program at the Ford Motor Company, who advised him to enroll at a design school in Los Angeles once his service ended.

Acting on that advice, Mead entered the Art Center School in Los Angeles (now the ArtCenter College of Design, Pasadena) in 1956, choosing it over Chouinard and the Los Angeles School of Art, and majored in industrial design with a concentration in automotive design. His tuition was met through the G.I. Bill, a Ford scholarship and part-time work. His training at Art Center included figure drawing from live models, fine art history, fashion drawing, graphics, and instruction in gouache, which became his preferred medium. Mead graduated in June 1959 with a Bachelor of Professional Arts, and was hired by Ford Motor Company's Advanced Styling Studio a semester before graduating.

== Career ==
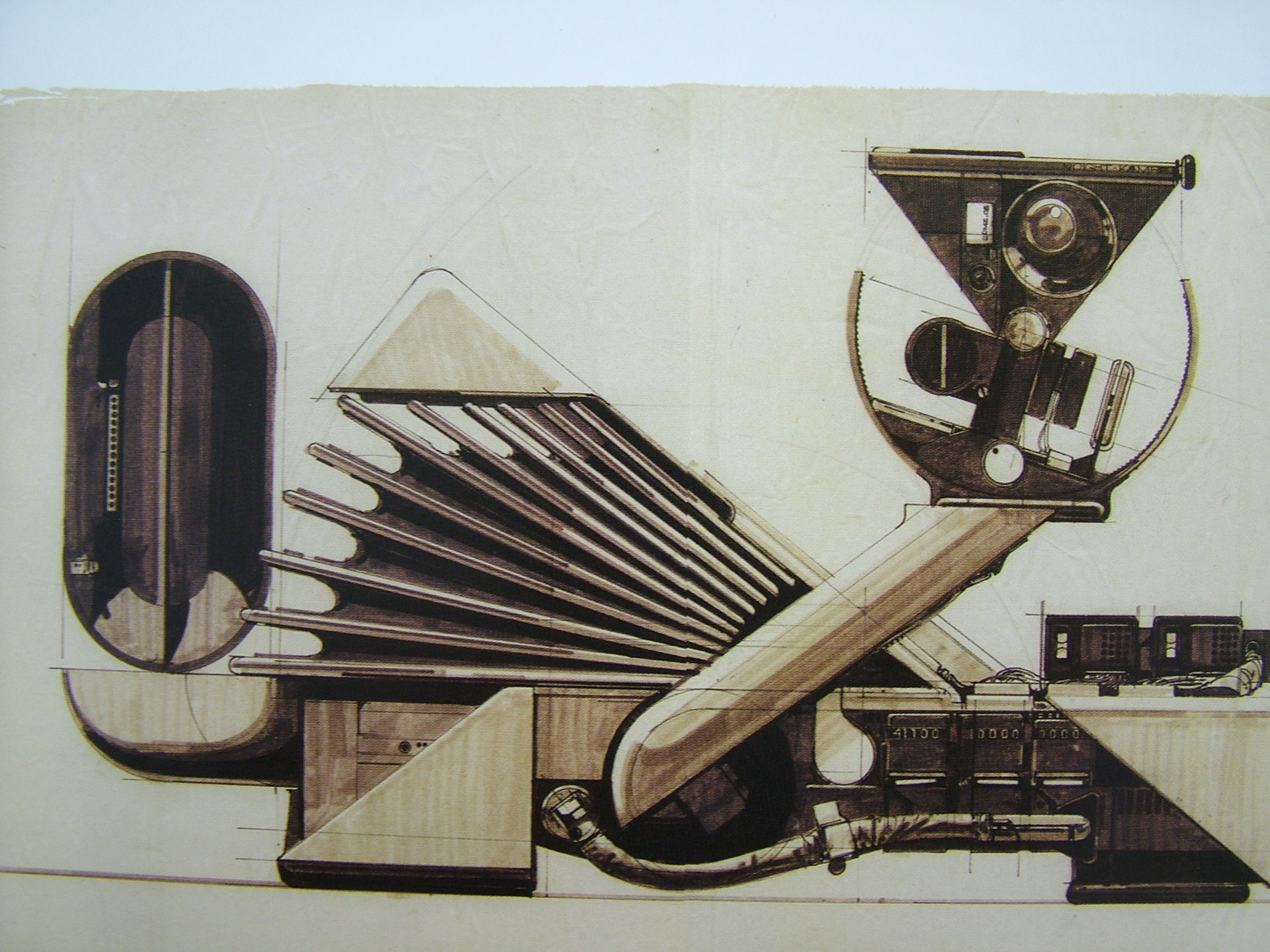
Voight-Kampff Machine, an example of Mead's artwork for Blade Runner

=== Ford Motor Company ===
Mead was recruited to Ford's Advanced Styling Studio in Detroit by Elwood Engel. He designed a launch exhibit for the Mercury Comet installed in the Ford Rotunda, and produced the full-size clay model design for the Gyron, a show vehicle built around a gyroscopic tandem-wheel system. Among his non-concept contributions were the tail lights of the 1963 Ford Falcon.

Mead left Ford after approximately twenty-six months. He attributed the departure to the "thinness of purpose" of production styling, stating that the process would be unchanged if the company switched from cars to washing machines.

=== Industrial illustration ===
Late in Mead's term at Ford, John Reinhart – who had since departed his role at Ford to lead automotive marketing for United States Steel – commissioned Mead to create a promotional catalog portraying steel as a "material of the future". Mead painted the illustrations and laid out the entire volume in a month for a fee of $10,000. The catalog, Concepts (1961), proved to be a sensation well beyond its intended use as sales literature, and was converted into general promotional and marketing materials for the company.

Four further U.S. Steel titles followed: Projections (1962), Perspective (1964), Innovations (1968), concluding in 1969 with Interface: Portfolio of Possibilities, which was issued as a poster portfolio rather than a bound book. U.S. Steel distributed the volumes widely, supplying them to art and design schools across the United States, and advertised free copies in youth magazines. Mead later said the books "went horizontal through the design community," becoming cult objects among students across various disciplines.

The U.S. Steel commission was what drove Mead's departure from Ford in June 1961. Other commissions of the period included a promotional book and corporate logo redesign for Allis-Chalmers, a campaign for the Celcon division of Celanese, work with Raymond Loewy's Paris and New York studios, the Ford Ranger II custom vehicle for Ford's light truck division, and a consolidated logo system for Ford's Ford, Lincoln and Mercury divisions. Continuing his freelance relationship with Ford, Mead further designed the company's pavilion at the 1964 New York World's Fair. Among his speculative vehicle designs during these years were the Sentinel 280, a canopied long-wheelbase sports car, and the stretched Sentinel 400.

=== Syd Mead, Inc. ===
Mead founded Syd Mead, Inc. in Detroit in 1970. He began with no clients, relying on the contacts and portfolio accumulated during the Ford and U.S. Steel years, and was contacted shortly afterward by Knut Yran, the Norwegian design director of Philips Electronics, whose account funded the new company. During this period, Mead turned down staff positions at General Motors and Chrysler. The firm relocated to California in 1975 and to Pasadena in 1998, and remained the vehicle for the whole of his subsequent career, including his film commissions. Its practice was unusually broad even by the standards of industrial design consultancies, and the film work for which Mead became publicly known represented a minority of its output.

==== Industrial and product design ====
Mead's first major account was with Philips Electronics' Corporate Industrial Design Centre in Eindhoven, a relationship that lasted twelve years. Through the 1970s, Mead spent roughly a third of his time in Europe. For the company's Netherlands Advanced Technology laboratory, he produced forward designs across its entire range – computers, televisions, refrigerators, cassette recorders, the first laser-disc recorder and the interior of the corporate jet – typically projecting five to six years ahead of current technology so that management and advertising could be prepared for products before launch. He worked concurrently with Raymond Loewy Associates in Paris and New York across a range of projects, including interior concepts for Concorde and the first Airbus interior.

From 1983 onward, Mead built a second base of clients in Japan, among them Sony, Minolta, Dentsu, Dyflex, Tiger Corporation, Seibu, Mitsukoshi, Bandai, NHK and Honda. The work ranged from consumer products for The Tiger Corporation, to advertising illustration for Minolta and RAYS Wheels. Mead served for several years as chief judge of Sony's international design competition.

==== Transportation, aviation and marine ====
Mead's transportation work extended well beyond automobiles. In 1973, Norwegian Caribbean Lines commissioned him to design a cruise ship, a project he later named as his favorite non-automotive work. He designed the interior of a Boeing 747 for the royal house of Saudi Arabia and a 747SP for the royal house of Oman, and a Boeing 727 for the Sultan of Brunei. Marine commissions included a succession of surface-effect-ship yacht designs for Halter Marine, a superyacht for Michael Peters Yachts in 1993, and an air-cushion vehicle for the royal house of Malaysia through Textron Marine. He also produced an interior for the Lancia Delta with Giorgetto Giugiaro at Italdesign in the late 1970s.

==== Architecture and the built environment ====
Architectural rendering for other firms was the practice's steadiest commercial work through the 1970s and 1980s. Clients included Intercontinental Hotels, 3D International, Harwood K. Smith and Partners, Donghia, Gresham & Smith, RTKL and Trammell Crow.

Distinct from this rendering work, Mead originated architectural and urban proposals of his own. These included a city-center scheme for Houston, TX, a spaceport complex for Kobe developed in 1987, and civic, commercial and exposition centers for clients in South Korea and Singapore. In 2008, he designed the Bar Basque and Food Parc, a Manhattan restaurant and bar, with Philip Koether Architects. The spaces operated in the Eventi Hotel from 2010 before shuttering in 2012.

==== Themed entertainment ====
From the late 1980s onward, the firm took on a substantial body of themed-entertainment work, much of it in Japan and Korea. Mead designed laser-tag arena attractions for Dyflex in Tokyo, among them a six-story venue in Shibuya. He produced a master plan for a waterfront "space park" in Kitakyushu for Toei Animation and Nippon Steel, a nine-screen Euro Disney attraction, and later interior concepts at Disneyland for Walt Disney Imagineering. Other commissions included a casino attraction for the Las Vegas Hilton and theatre, theme-castle and exposition projects for Landmark Entertainment.

==== Editorial work, lecturing and licensing ====
Mead illustrated for Automobile Quarterly, Playboy, National Geographic and Car Styling from the late 1960s onward, the magazine commissions often pairing his illustrations with speculative essays on future life and technology.

In 1983, Chrysler Corporation invited Mead to address its design staff. The accompanying slide presentation was subsequently expanded and delivered to clients including Disney, Carnegie Mellon University, Purdue University, Pratt Institute and the Society of Illustrators, and lecturing became a continuing part of the practice. In March 2010, he completed a four-city lecture tour of Australia. In 1993, a digital gallery of 50 works, with interface screens designed by Mead, became one of the first CD-ROMs released in Japan. In 2004, he worked with the Gnomon School of Visual Effects on a four-volume instructional DVD series, Techniques of Syd Mead.

Licensed and commissioned one-off designs continued into his final years, among them a Hot Wheels edition of his Sentinel 400 limousine for Mattel in 2001, wristwatch designs produced in Tokyo, apparel lines for the London label Addict and for Opening Ceremony, and the promotional poster for the 2000 Pebble Beach Concours d'Elegance.

=== Film ===
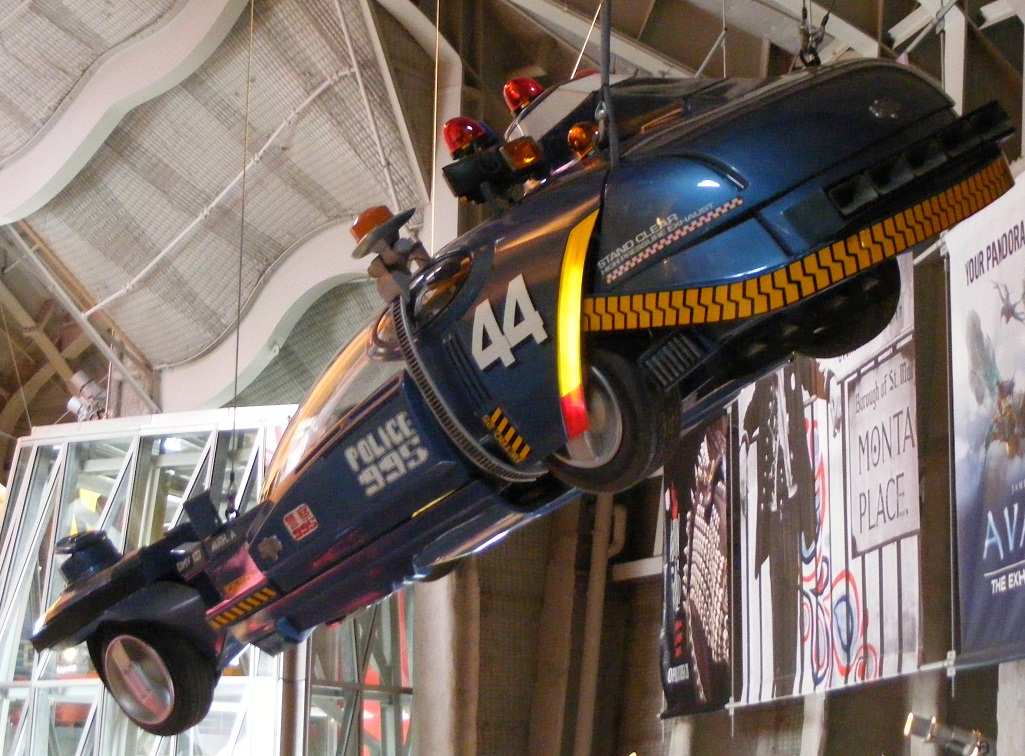
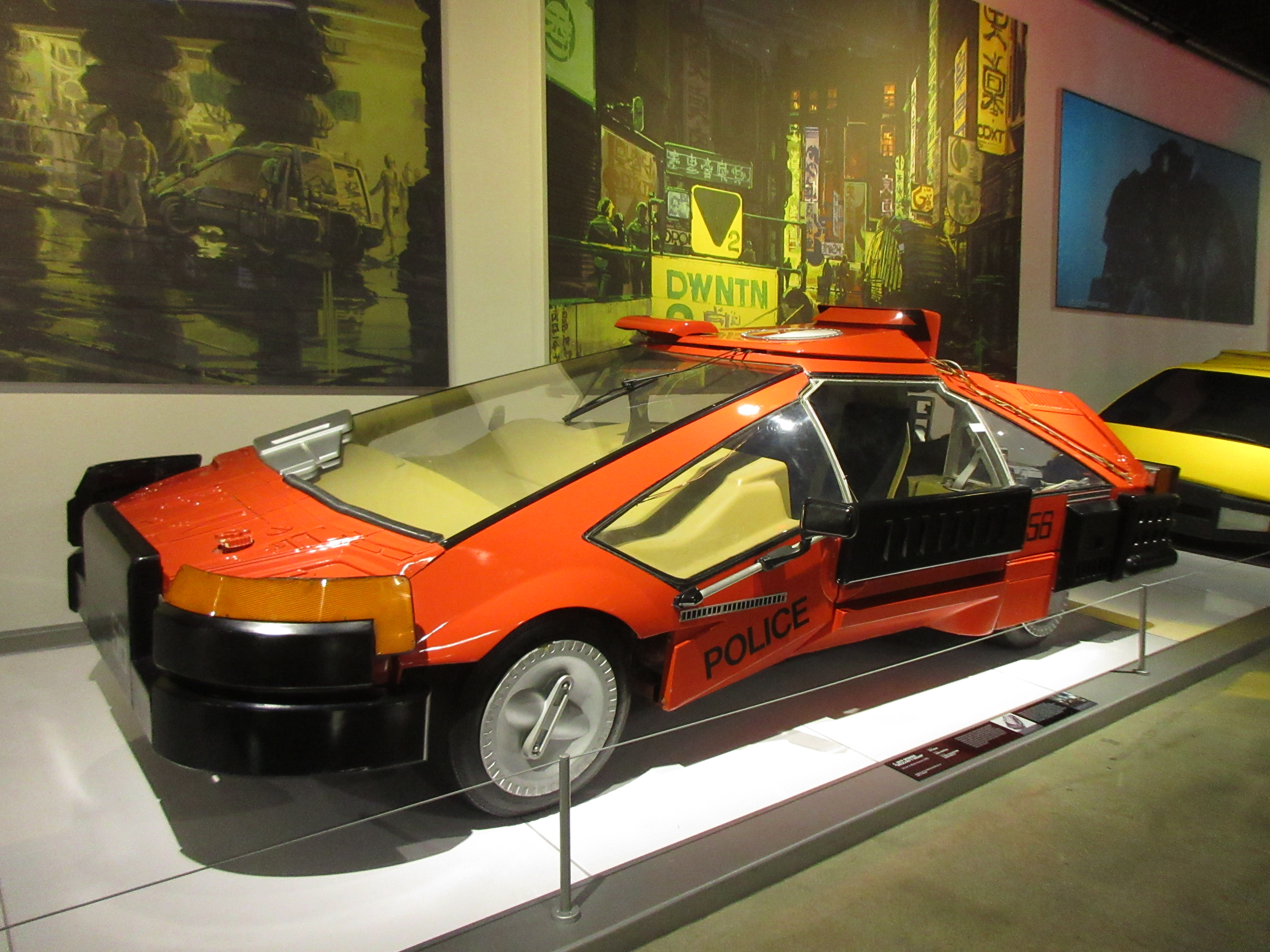
Mead is best known for his work on films such as Blade Runner. Some of Mead's concept art is visible in the background of the second image.

Mead's feature credits include Star Trek: The Motion Picture, Blade Runner, Tron, 2010, Short Circuit, Aliens, Timecop, Johnny Mnemonic, Mission to Mars, Mission: Impossible III, Elysium, Tomorrowland and Blade Runner 2049. He also contributed to the Japanese film Solar Crisis.

Mead described his method as designing to the internal logic of a film's story world rather than to personal preference, and required an initial meeting with the director to establish that world's technology base before accepting a commission.

==== Star Wars ====
Mead's work reached the film industry before he did. Because U.S. Steel had distributed his catalogues to design schools, they circulated widely among students in the late 1960s, including Joe Johnston and John Dykstra, who studied together at Long Beach State University. Johnston, later art director on the original Star Wars films, has said that the portfolios were presented to design students as a statement of what the future would look like, and recalled being struck in particular by an illustration of a four-legged walking truck moving through a snowy forest.

Johnston and George Lucas derived the AT-AT of The Empire Strikes Back (1980) from that image, a vehicle Mead referred to as a "snow walker" that he had painted for the 1969 U.S. Steel portfolio Interface. Johnston has since publicly acknowledged Mead's illustration as the source of the design. Mead was not involved in the production and was not consulted. Lucas is among the private owners of Mead's original artwork. In 2010, Mead was invited by Lucas to produce original work for the anthology Star Wars Art: Visions.

==== Star Trek: The Motion Picture ====
Mead's first film commission in early 1979 — for the design of the V'ger entity, the antagonist of Star Trek: The Motion Picture — came from the same circle of Star Wars-associated designers who had encountered his U.S. Steel books as students. Star Wars visual effects supervisor John Dykstra, by then a co-founder of the effects house Apogee, kept a personal collection of Mead's catalogs and telephoned him, asking if he would ever consider working on a science fiction film. Director Robert Wise's brief, as Mead described it, was for something no one had seen before. Mead designed V'ger as a six-sided twisted structure, which he compared to the sculpture of Isamu Noguchi.

==== Blade Runner and Tron ====
Shortly after Star Trek: The Motion Picture's December 1979 premiere, Ridley Scott engaged Mead for Blade Runner, having encountered a collection of his work in a London bookshop. Mead was the first person on the film's official staff list. While the initial commission was for the vehicle driven by Rick Deckard, the film's protagonist, Mead extended the work to the surrounding architecture, street sets and prop fixtures. Roughly twenty full-size vehicles were built for the production, among them three Spinners, the taxi and Sebastian's truck.

A location shoot in Hong Kong having been ruled out on budget grounds, Scott and Mead photographed standing sets on the Warner Bros. backlot, which Mead then drew over. He assembled the street architecture from Byzantine columns, Art Deco, scaffolding and Mayan sidewall forms. The production team termed the result "retro-deco" and "trash chic." Individual props were reasoned from the same premise, with Sebastian's truck being assembled from components Mead postulated would be present in a junkyard in 2019.

Mead designed Steven Lisberger's Tron concurrently, revising and replacing designs already commissioned. He returned to Blade Runner afterward to produce matte-painting preliminaries for effects shots at Douglas Trumbull's facility in Marina del Rey, working with special effects supervisor David Dryer.

Mead cited the concurrency of the two productions in rejecting characterizations of his work as inherently dark, stating that he had been engaged to design a dystopia as a professional assignment. Denis Villeneuve has characterized Blade Runner as the single occasion on which Mead worked in a dystopian register, and has said that Mead's first drawings of Los Angeles were bright and peaceful before Scott asked for a more claustrophobic and oppressive world.

Asked what title he wanted on the Blade Runner credits, Mead proposed "visual futurist," a term he invented for the purpose.

==== Aliens and Short Circuit ====
James Cameron sent Mead the script for Aliens (1986) directly, and Mead began designing the troop transport Sulaco during the flight after receiving it, working from a sketch Cameron had provided. The ship was kept broadly flat because Cameron intended to track the camera past it at speed and did not want to pull focus. Mead developed it into a heavily armed freight carrier and also designed interior sets including the cafeteria and the egg chamber. He contrasted the approach with Ridley Scott's Alien, whose ship he characterized as an industrial derrick moving through space.

In 1985 Mead worked on John Badham's Short Circuit (1986), designing the "Johnny Five" robot.

==== Later work and unrealized projects ====
Mead's later film and television credits included Strange Days (1995), Johnny Mnemonic (1995), Timecop (1994), Peter Hyams's The Core (2003) and A Sound of Thunder (2005), the mask-maker design for J. J. Abrams's Mission: Impossible III (2006), Neill Blomkamp's Elysium (2013), and the Las Vegas sequences for Denis Villeneuve's Blade Runner 2049 (2017), which was Mead's final film.

In 1998, Mead was consulted on the design of the rocket ship for a proposed Simpsons spin-off then in development at Rough Draft Studios under the title Futurama.

A substantial share of Mead's film work was for productions that were never completed or released, and survives chiefly through his own books and archives. These included a remake of Forbidden Planet and a live-action version of The Jetsons.

==== Documentaries ====
Mead completed work in May 2007 on Visual Futurist: The Art & Life of Syd Mead, directed by Joaquin Montalvan. The short 2008 documentary 2019: A Future Imagined also covered his work. He appears in Dangerous Days: Making Blade Runner, Mark Kermode's On the Edge of Blade Runner, the DVD extra for Aliens, and a short film on the making of 2010.

=== Anime and video games ===
In the 1990s, Mead supplied designs for the anime series Turn A Gundam and the unfinished Yamato 2520.

In 1992 he participated in the production of the TurboGrafx-CD game Syd Mead's TerraForming. He provided visual designs for the racing games CyberRace (1993) and Cyber Speedway (1995).

=== Independent painting ===
Alongside his client work, Mead produced a sizable body of independent work. Some works were painted for their own sake, while others were completed to memorialize exhibitions of his art. Works of this kind include The Running of the 200th Kentucky Derby (1975), Party 2000 (1977), Moon 2000 (1979), Entering Stargate (1991) and Cavalcade to the Crimson Castle (1996). Shoulder of Orion was completed for the 2012 Progressions retrospective at the Forest Lawn Museum.

Mead's works typically depict future scenarios of people in states of leisure (rather than labor), usually placing figures at an event or an arrival within a fully realized setting. Mead usually accompanied preliminary sketches with written notes working through the sociology and engineering of the worlds depicted, including how the structures shown might be built with technology that did not yet exist. Because they were not tied to a production or a product, Mead's body of original work has been described as the clearest expression of his generally optimistic personal outlook and philosophy, in contrast to the often dystopian settings he was engaged to design for film.

== Technique ==
Mead executed his work by hand. He sketched with fine-line pens and gray-scale felt-tip markers on letter paper or large layout pads, and completed finished illustrations in Winsor & Newton gouache applied with both airbrush and animal-hair brushes. He referred to gouache as "French for bitchy medium."

Mead continued to use pencils, T-squares, French curves and a pantograph into his later career, and said that learning rendering software would not have been time-efficient for him relative to gouache. His late career working methods nonetheless combined hand and digital stages. He characterized the object of his client illustration as the production of a convincing photograph of something that did not exist.

Writing after Mead's death, Slate described him as among the last practitioners of twentieth-century professional illustration, trained when a perspective examination might require a student to draw a room containing an angled mirror and be graded on the accuracy of the reflection.

== Influences and style ==
Mead's father kept books on Raphael and Caravaggio, which Mead studied as a child and credited with his interest in formal composition and the rendering of light and shadow. Mead cited the influence of Chesley Bonestell throughout his life, his parents having given him a book of his collected works while he was in junior high school. He identified the bullet-nosed Studebaker Starlight coupe of the late 1940s as his boyhood conception of a future car, and later worked as a consultant with its designer, Raymond Loewy. At Art Center, he studied Caravaggio and Miró, and said this allowed him to carry the conventions of classical painting – lighting, shadow and the drawing of figures – into professional rendering. Other artists of influence he named include the illustrators John Berkey and Maxfield Parrish. Commentators have also identified the arcologies of Paolo Soleri as a likely influence for Mead's megastructures. Mead named Knut Yran of Philips, Raymond Loewy, and Strother MacMinn, an instructor at Art Center, as mentors of prominence throughout his career.

Mead placed designed objects within complete scenarios rather than isolating them, stating that nothing exists by itself on a blank sheet of paper. He termed one recurring device "supersonic baroque," in which dense ornamental pattern is mapped over geometric solids, and traced the principle to Chinese lacquer work, in which motifs are wrapped around physical surfaces. Mead treated the combination of historical and speculative forms as a deliberate method, noting that humanity does "go into the future from zero" but "drag[s] the whole past in with us."

Architecturally, Mead expressed a preference for classical and functional building over what he called "architecture as object", citing Philip Johnson's AT&T Building and Minoru Yamasaki's World Trade Center as works he admired. He identified Angkor Wat and Mayan ceremonial architecture as references for the Tyrell headquarters in Blade Runner. Of his architectural rendering work he said he had painted architecture as a visual romance, favoring the interval immediately after sundown.

== Themes and critical reception ==
Mead described himself as a commercial artist rather than a fine artist, while still noting that "commercial art is art." . His preferred formulation was that "fine art often offends both words," and he criticized what he saw as a studied naïveté in contemporary corporate and media graphics, a manner he characterized as professionals being paid to draw in a style a child could manage. He gave his occupation variously as industrial designer, illustrator and "visual futurist," the last a term he coined for his Blade Runner credit and then applied to his wider practice.

Mead's work outside cinema is predominantly optimistic in outlook, and he distanced himself from the dystopian associations of Blade Runner. Denis Villeneuve has described him as one of the last great utopians. Critics have noted that his non-cinematic paintings concentrate on leisure – racing, arrival, spectacle and social gathering – contain few depictions of labor, and that his imagined environments are almost entirely free of branding and signage.

Commentators have further remarked on the physical weight of his rendering, particularly the treatment of chrome, glass and skin, and on a recurring composition in which figures are seen from behind facing an event or vista.

Since the 2020s, critics have identified a queer sensibility in the work. Reviewing Party 2000 (1977) and Cavalcade to the Crimson Castle (1996), Sarp Kerem Yavuz of The Art Newspaper argued that the bearing and choreography of Mead's figures encode an implicit queerness legible to queer viewers without announcing itself. In 2025, Collin Sundt of The Brooklyn Rail described his futures as worlds in which the parameters of sexuality are explicitly expanded, and noted that Mead, a gay man working within heteronormative corporate structures, pursued this knowingly. Art critic Evan Moffitt has situated Mead's work within José Esteban Muñoz's framework of queer futurity.

== Exhibitions ==
=== Solo exhibitions ===
Mead's first one-man exhibition took place in Germany in 1973. He was later included in documenta 6 in Kassel, West Germany, in 1977. Sponsored solo exhibitions followed in Japan, including presentations at the Laforet Museum in Tokyo in 1983, at Seibu in Tokyo in 1985, and at an Okamura Corporation trade fair in Tokyo in 1990. In 1996, Bright Red Mysteries, an exhibition of more than 100 works with an installation designed by Mead, was held at the Center for the Arts at Yerba Buena Gardens in San Francisco.

Syd Mead: Progressions, a travelling retrospective spanning more than fifty years of work, opened at the Forest Lawn Museum in Glendale, California, in January 2012 and included Shoulder of Orion, a gouache completed for the exhibition. It subsequently travelled to Kendall College of Art and Design in Grand Rapids, Michigan (2012), the Fort Collins Museum of Art in Colorado (2013), the Rebecca Randall Bryan Art Gallery at Coastal Carolina University (2014), and SIGGRAPH (2018). A Japanese presentation, Syd Mead Progressions TYO 2019, was held at 3331 Arts Chiyoda in Tokyo in 2019, and comprised approximately 150 works, many shown in Asia for the first time.

Syd Mead: Future Pastime, the first major posthumous exhibition of his paintings, opened in late March 2025 in New York City. The exhibition comprised sixteen original gouaches dated between 1968 and 2003.

=== Group exhibitions ===
In 2003, Mead's work was shown in Future Noir, an exhibition of science-fiction art with an accompanying film festival at the Williams Visual Arts Building at Lafayette College in Easton, Pennsylvania.

Mead was among the artists in Dreamlands: Immersive Cinema and Art, 1905–2016 at the Whitney Museum of American Art, on view from October 28, 2016, to February 5, 2017. Organized by curator Chrissie Iles, the exhibition surveyed a century of artists and filmmakers reworking the conventions of cinema.

Mead's original Blade Runner concept drawings, together with the film's Vid-Phon telecommunication device, were included in Cyberpunk: Envisioning Possible Futures Through Cinema at the Academy Museum of Motion Pictures in Los Angeles, which opened on October 6, 2024.

== Personal life ==
Mead was in a relationship with Roger Servick, who was also his business partner. They married in 2016. They established a publishing company, Oblagon, Inc., in Hollywood, and relocated in 1998 to Pasadena, California.

Mead had a younger brother, Gerald, and a sister, Peggy. His personal vehicles included a 1934 Ford roadster, several Cadillacs and Lincolns, and two Chrysler Imperial sedans. He retained a 1956 Mercedes-Benz 300SL gullwing coupe for several decades.

Mead announced his retirement in September 2019, after sixty years of design work. He died at his home in Pasadena on December 30, 2019, at age 86, after three years of lymphoma.

== Legacy ==
=== Film ===
Filmmakers who commissioned or drew on Mead's conceptual work include Robert Wise, Ridley Scott, Steven Lisberger, Peter Hyams, James Cameron, John Badham, Kathryn Bigelow, Brian DePalma, Brad Bird, Joseph Kosinski, J. J. Abrams, Neill Blomkamp and Denis Villeneuve.

Scott, who has described Mead as both an engineer and a designer capable of visualizing rapidly, characterized the first Mead book he owned as "Raymond Loewy on steroids," and has said that Mead's imagined Hong Kong shaped his own conception of the Blade Runner city. Villeneuve has called Mead one of the last great utopians and has attributed the atmosphere of his invented worlds to the optimism of the postwar decades. Gareth Edwards has said that science-fiction filmmakers are left with a choice between imitating Mead's work and falling short of it.

The special effects designer Adam Savage has described Mead as arguably the most important designer in science fiction and futurism generally, said his drawings conveyed scale and physical weight from minimal linework, and cited them as the first designs he copied as a teenager building models. The screenwriter and director Drew Pearce has cited Mead's practice of reasoning an entire civilization outward from a single object as an early instance of what is now termed "worldbuilding".

=== Design, architecture and industry ===
The industrial designer Marc Newson has described Mead's renderings as the first futuristic imagery he encountered, credited them with providing the visual language through which he and others imagined the future, and noted that Mead's forecasts were simultaneously optimistic and plausible. Patrik Schumacher, principal of Zaha Hadid Architects, has said Mead's speculative renderings influenced successive generations of architects and designers, including himself.

The German industrial designer Luigi Colani, asked in a 2009 interview which contemporary he most admired, named Mead, describing him as a conceptualist who was designing things that did not yet exist for the next fifty years. Flavio Manzoni, Ferrari's chief design officer, has named Mead among the visionary designers who inspired him in his youth and has cited his work alongside Alex Raymond's Flash Gordon as formative. Colin Marshall paired Mead with the architect John Portman as representative figures of postwar American urban optimism.

Elon Musk has said the Tesla Cybertruck drew on Mead's designs. Mead commented favorably on the vehicle at its unveiling in November 2019. Road & Track has described his Sentinel concepts as anticipating the wedge era of automotive styling by roughly a decade.

=== Recognition ===
Mead received the Inkpot Award in 1989 and the National Design Award from the Cooper Hewitt, Smithsonian Design Museum in 2006. In 2016 he became the third recipient of the Car Design News Lifetime Achievement Award, after Marcello Gandini and Giorgetto Giugiaro. In 2017 he received a lifetime achievement award from the Eyes on Design organization in Detroit. He was also given the Visual Effects Society Visionary Award and inducted into the Society of Illustrators Hall of Fame.

At the time of Mead's death in 2019, he had been due to receive the Art Directors Guild's William Cameron Menzies Award at the guild's ceremony five weeks later. Its president, Nelson Coates, described Mead's role in shaping cinema as unique and singular in its capacity to visualize the future, and the award was presented posthumously.

=== Games, animation and music ===
Marcus Lehto, co-creator of Halo, has said that Blade Runner, 2010 and Tron were formative for him as a young adult, that Aliens shaped the Halo universe as the first game in the series was being developed, and that he kept Mead's books Oblagon and Sentury at his desk for reference.

Katsuhiro Otomo has said that the initial inspiration for Kaneda's motorcycle in Akira was the light cycles Mead designed for Tron, which he narrowed to roughly half their width as a starting point. Mead in turn incorporated Otomo's design alongside his own light cycle in a mural produced for Honda in 2004. The Art Newspaper has also noted the resemblance between his 1983 painting Running of the Six Drgxx and the podracing sequence of Star Wars: Episode I – The Phantom Menace (1999). The musician Grimes has said that Blade Runner was her first encounter with Mead's work and that its aesthetic has remained with her since.

In the 2020 RPG Cyberpunk 2077, a memorial to Mead may be found in the Columbarium.

== Gallery of works ==
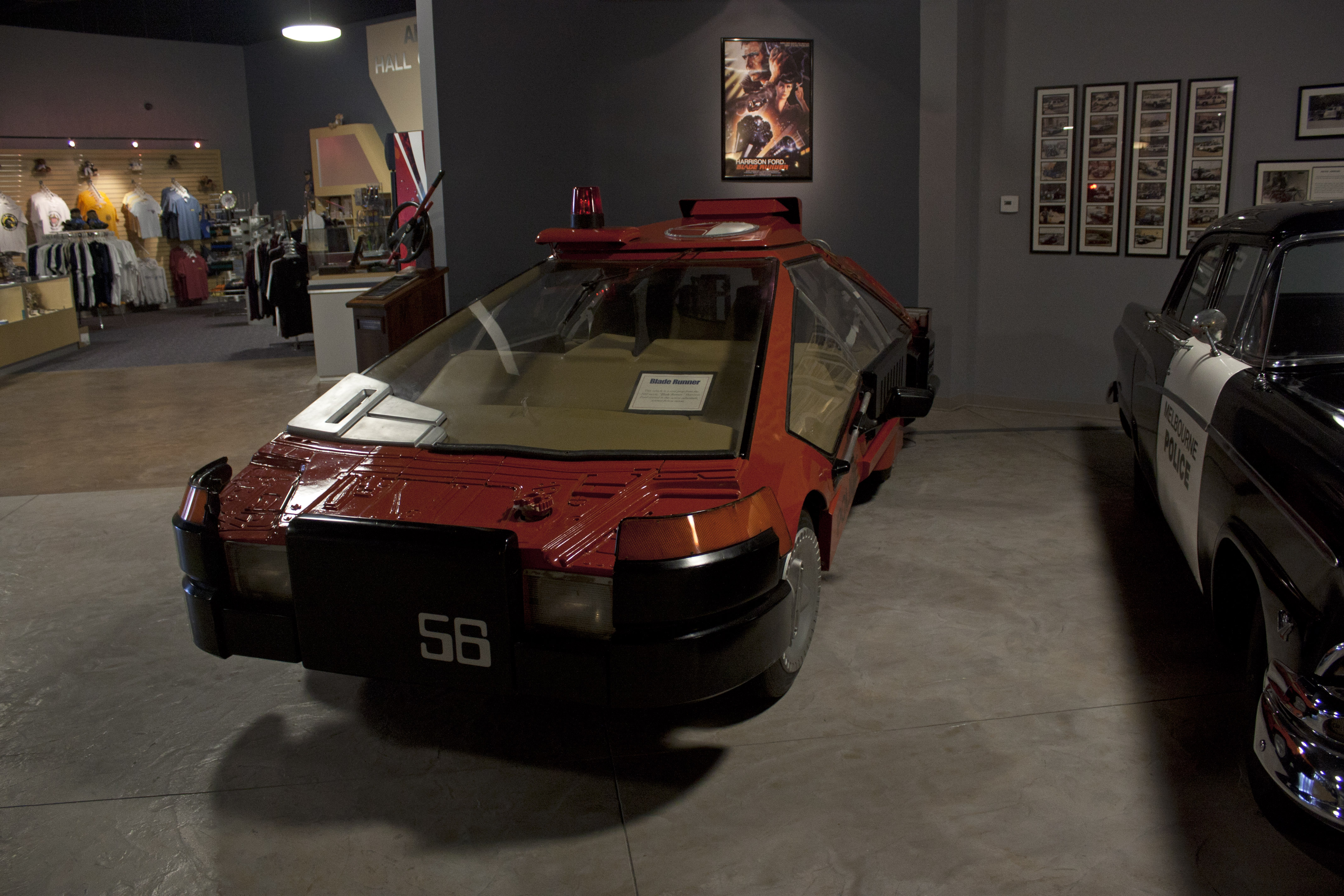
Blade Runner Car at the American Police Hall of Fame

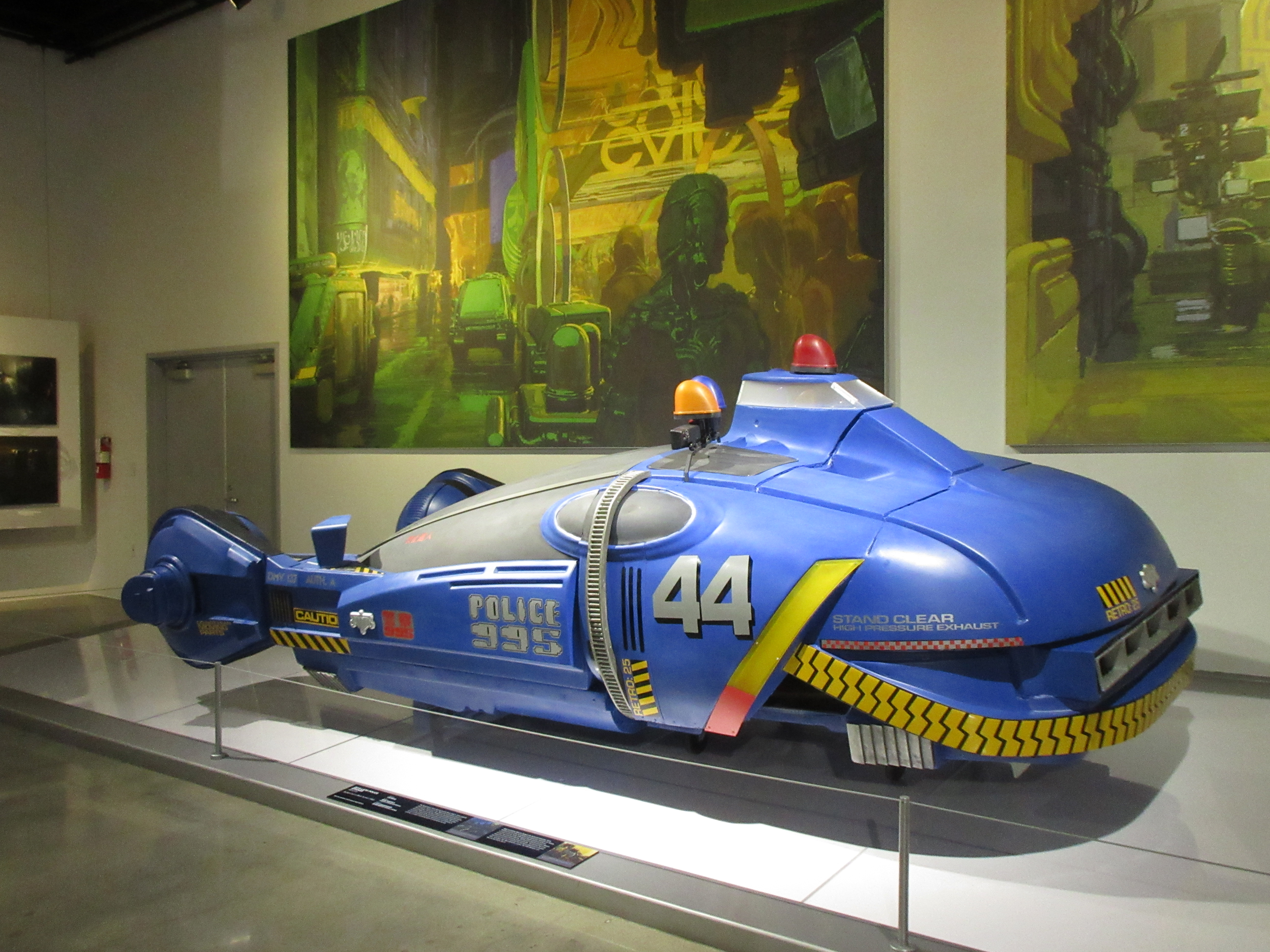
A police spinner from Blade Runner

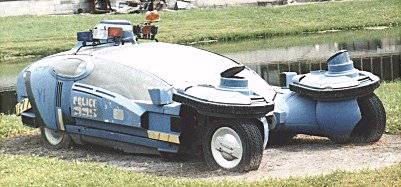
A car Mead designed for the film Blade Runner

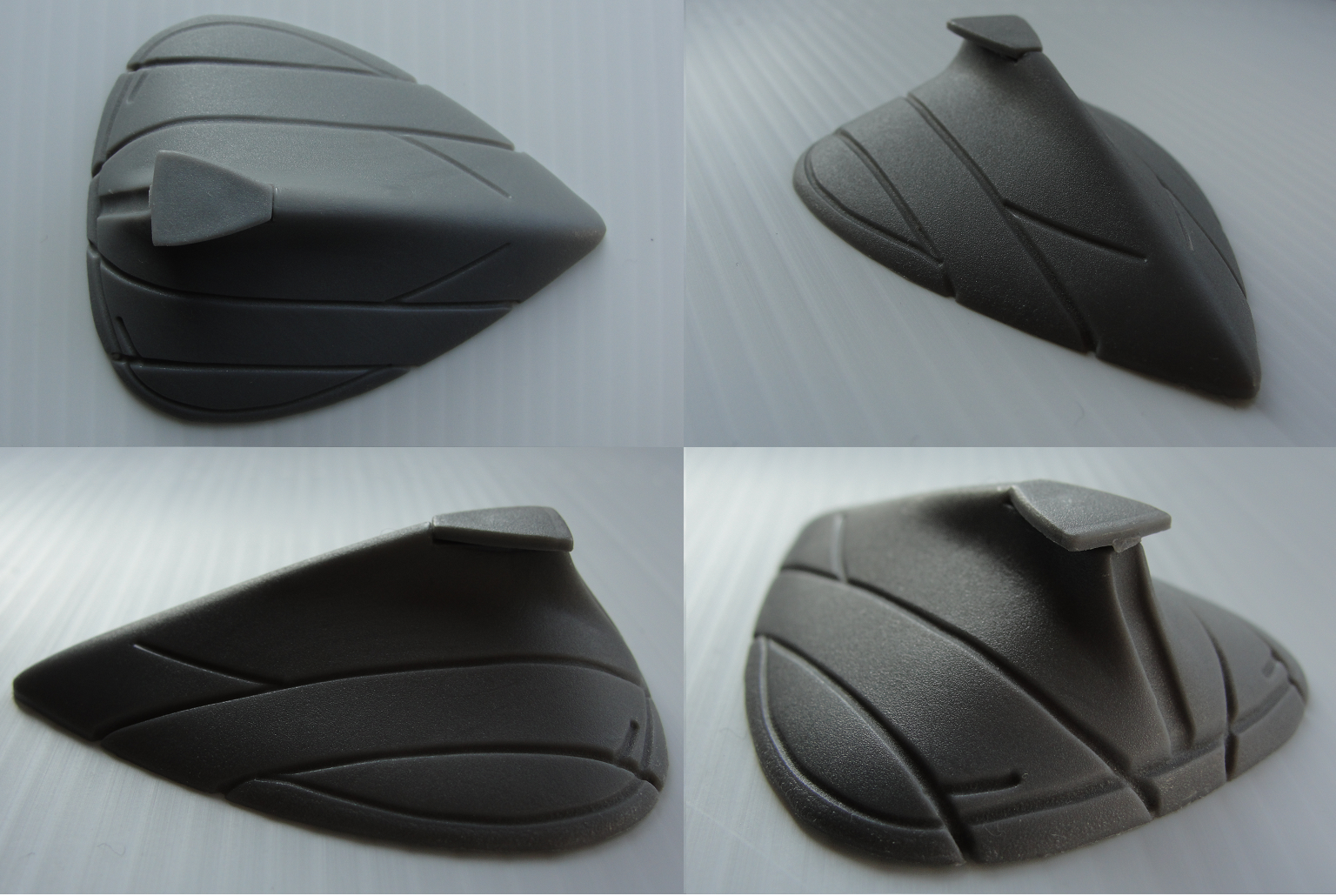
A plastic representation of a Cyberrace vehicle

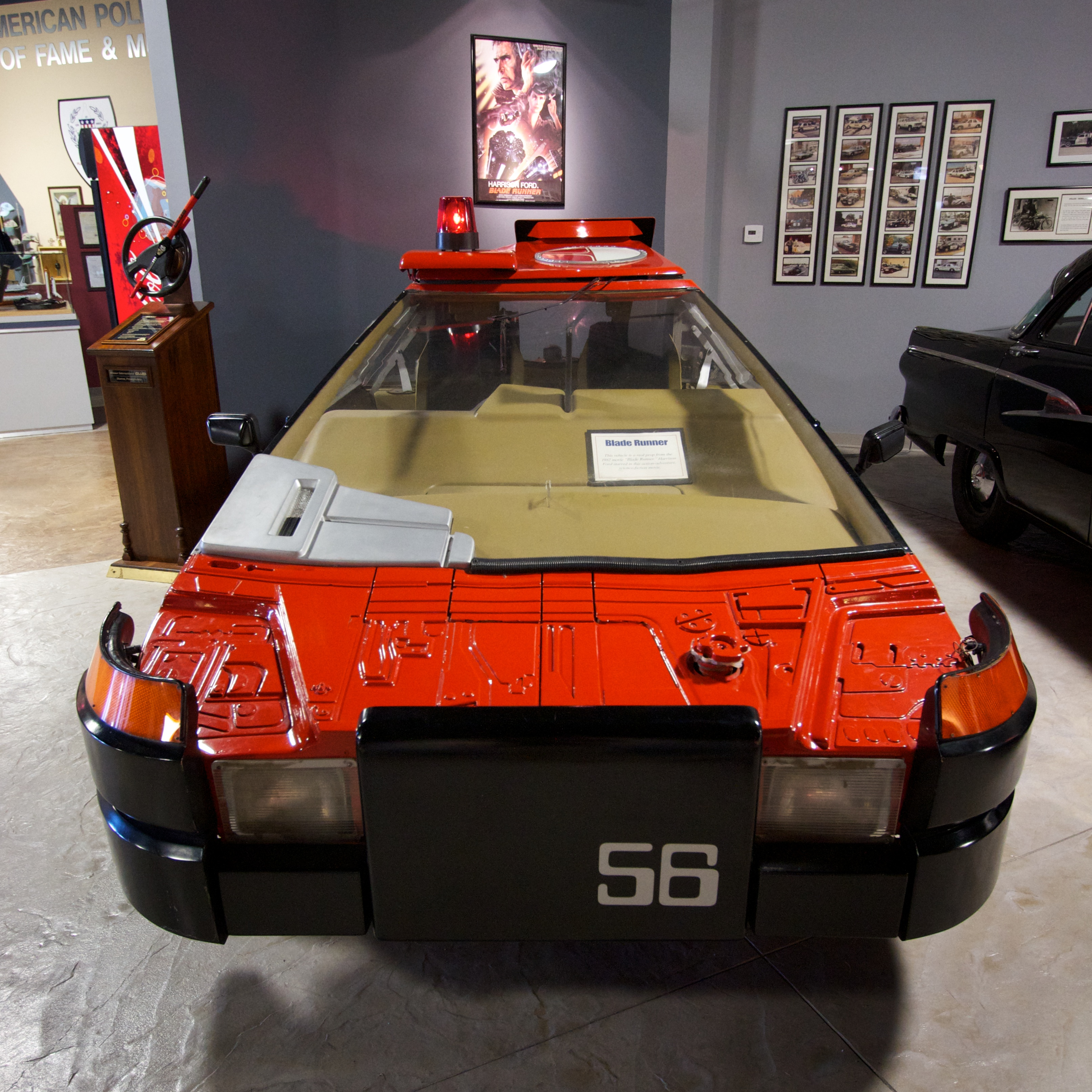
Rick Deckard's car from Blade Runner

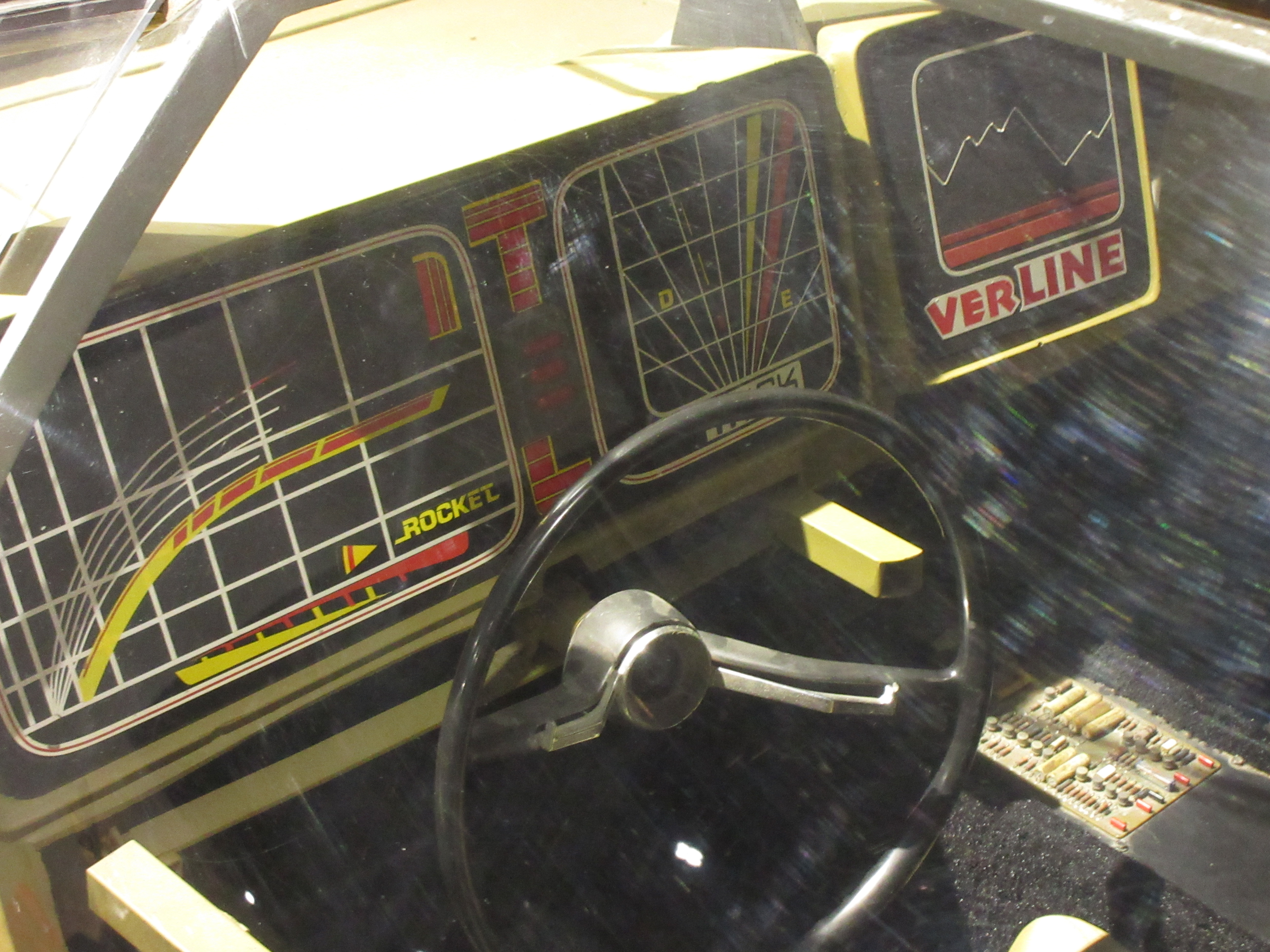
The interior of a car from Blade Runner

== Publications ==
- Sentinel. Dragon's Dream, 1979. ISBN 978-0825695506
- Oblagon: Concepts of Syd Mead. Kodansha, 1985. ISBN 978-4062015257
- Sentinel II. Kodansha International / Oblagon, 1987. ISBN 978-4062034524
- Studio Image One. Books Nippan / Oblagon, 1988. ISBN 978-0929463001
- Kronoteko. Bandai, 1991. ISBN 978-0929463056
- Kronolog. Oblagon, 1992. ISBN 978-0929463070
- Syd Mead's Sentury. Oblagon, 2001. ISBN 978-0929463094
- Syd Mead's Sentury II. Design Studio Press, 2010. ISBN 978-1933492902
- A Future Remembered. Oblagon, 2018. ISBN 978-0-929463-13-1
- Studio Image 1. Design Studio Press, 2023. ISBN 978-1624650789
- Studio Image 2. Design Studio Press, 2023. ISBN 978-1624650796
- Studio Image 3. Design Studio Press, 2023. ISBN 978-1624650802

== See also ==
- Futurist
