= Dianne Wager =

American art director and production designer (1931-2011)

- Born: October 16, 1931; Milwaukee
- Died: August 23, 2011 (aged 79); Duarte, California
- Education: Chouinard Art Institute
- Occupations: Production designer, art director, set designer
- Awards: Art Directors Guild Hall of Fame (2016)

Dianne Wager (October 16, 1931 – August 23, 2011) was an art director, production designer, and set designer for motion pictures and television.

Wager was born in Milwaukee in 1931. She moved to Los Angeles and studied set design and set illustration at the Chouinard Art Institute. In 1964, she was hired by Twentieth Century Fox as a set designer on the television series, Peyton Place. While at Fox, she also worked on the Batman television series and the feature film Fantastic Voyage.

Through the 1970s, Wager worked with Oscar-winning production designer Dale Hennesy. When Hennesy died in 1981 during the production of Annie. She received ADG Award nominations for art direction on Pleasantville (1999) and for set design on Changeling (2008).

Wager died in 2011, and in 2016, she was posthumously inducted into the Art Directors Guild Hall of Fame.

== Selected works ==
- Peyton Place (1964-1969, set designer, 514 episodes)
- Fantastic Voyage (1966, set designer)
- Batman (1966-1968, set designer and production designer, 120 episodes)
- Gaily, Gaily (1969, set designer)
- Sleeper (1973, set design)
- King Kong (1976, set designer)
- Who'll Stop the Rain (1978, set designer)
- The Competition (1980, set design)
- The Island (1980, set designer)
- Wholly Moses! (1980, set designer)
- Annie (1982, assistant art director)
- The Man Who Loved Women (1983, set designer)
- Two of a Kind (1983, set designer)
- The Buddy System (1984, set designer)
- Unfaithfully Yours (1984, set design)
- Rhinestone (1984, set designer)
- Unfaithfully Yours (1984, set designer)
- The Man with One Red Shoe (1985, assistant art director)
- Jo Jo Dancer, Your Life Is Calling (1986, set designer)
- Short Circuit (1986, art director)
- Project X (1987, assistant art director)
- Spaceballs (1987, assistant art director)
- Scrooged (1988, set designer)
- Bert Rigby, You're a Fool (1989, art director)
- Lethal Weapon 2 (1989, set designer)
- Havana (1990, assistant art director)
- The Hunt for Red October (1990, art director)
- The Butcher's Wife (1991, set designer)
- Delirious (1991, set decorator)
- For the Boys (1991, art director)
- Sneakers (1992, art director)
- Malice (1993, art director)
- Renaissance Man (1994, assistant art director)
- Malice (1993, art director)
- Star Trek Generations (1994, set designer)
- Crimson Tide (1995, art director)
- Heat (1995, assistant art director)
- One Fine Day (1996, set designer)
- The Relic (1997, set designer)
- Volcano (1997, set designer)
- Bulworth (1998, set design)
- Pleasantville (1998, art director)
- The Parent Trap (1998, set designer)
- The Siege (1998, assistant art director)
- Galaxy Quest (1999, set designer)
- The Green Mile (1999, set designer)
- Heartbreakers (2001, set designer)
- Jurassic Park III (2001, set designer)
- The Adventures of Pluto Nash (2002, set designer)
- Stuart Little 2 (2002, set designer)
- Something's Gotta Give (2003, set designer)
- John Adams (2008, assistant art director)
- Changeling (2008, set designer)
