= Julia McIlvaine =

American actress

- Occupation: Actress
- Years active: 1989–present

Julia McIlvaine is an American voice actress, perhaps best known for providing the voice of June on Nickelodeon's KaBlam!. She also has a career in singing, dance, and athletics.

== Acting career ==
She has been in numerous theater plays, commercials and films.

=== Films ===
- Office Killer as Linda
- Fireworks
- Handjive as Sophie
- Enter Long Fang

=== Television ===
- Judging Amy as Pamela Taylor
- The Binikers as Sarah
- The Summer of Ben Tyler as Nell Rayburn
- The Lost Child as Caroline
- Danny as Sally
- KaBlam! as June, Dawn
- A Christmas Memory as Rachel
- MAD as Bambi, Calleigh Duquesne, Cruella de Vil, Cristina Yang
- Normal, Ohio as Kimberly Miller
- Madness Reins as Princess Olga
- On The River as Jennifer
- Pokémon: Twilight Wings as John and Oleana
- The Summer of Ben Tyler as Nell Rayburn
- Sword Art Online: Alicization as Azurica
- Fate/stay night: Heaven's Feel as Sella (Original Theatrical Edition)
- Monster Girl Doctor as Tisalia Scythia
- My Next Life as a Villainess: All Routes Lead to Doom! X as Selena Burke

=== Video games ===
List of voice performances in video games
Year	Title	Role	Notes	Source
2012	Guild Wars 2	Sieran		
2014	Lightning Returns: Final Fantasy XIII	Additional voices		
2018	Final Fantasy XV	Garuda (Final Fantasy XV version)		
2019	Pokémon Masters	Olivia		Tweet
2019	Fire Emblem Heroes	Echidna		
2020	One-Punch Man: A Hero Nobody Knows	Additional voices		
2021	Scarlet Nexus	Additional voices		
2023	Fire Emblem Engage	Lumera		
2025	Date Everything!	Celia, Marco, Ciggy, Lint Eastwood		

== Music career ==
- Homecoming
- Kings Island Christmas

== Awards ==
Year	Association	Award Category	Result
1995	International Modeling and Talent Association	First place in singing and dramatic monologue	Won
1997	Young Artists Award through the Academy for Professional Entertainers	Best Young Actress in a TV Movie or Miniseries	Nominated
1998	Drama League Awards	Outstanding Artists of the 1997-1998 Season	Won
