= Cyber Speedway =

1995 video game

- North American cover art
- Developer: Nextech
- Publisher: Sega
- Designer: Syd Mead
- Platform: Sega Saturn
- Release: NA: 1995; JP: May 26, 1995; EU: December 1995
- Genre: Racing
- Modes: Single-player, multiplayer

Cyber Speedway (Gran Chaser in Japan) is a 1995 racing video game developed by Nextech and published by Sega for the Sega Saturn. The game was originally called Grand Racer, but was renamed to avoid confusion with another early Saturn game, Gale Racer. It is a spiritual sequel to the 1993 computer game CyberRace; the two games share a similar theme, and vehicles designed by Syd Mead.

== Gameplay ==
Cyber Speedway is a futuristic racing game in which players control hovering vehicles across courses featuring sharp turns, tunnels, jumps and environmental hazards. Vehicles are equipped with weapons and speed boosts, allowing players to attack opponents and gain an advantage during races. The game supports both single-player competition and two-player split-screen racing.

The game features five different vehicle designs and 11 courses, with different layouts and environmental conditions. The courses are divided into Standard and Advanced difficulty levels, with later stages introducing more challenging obstacles and track layouts.

== Development ==
Cyber Speedway was developed by Nextech and published by Sega for the Sega Saturn. Originally announced as Grand Racer, the game was renamed Gran Chaser to avoid confusion with another Saturn racing game, Gale Racer. The game was described by Edge as a loose adaptation of CyberRace, a 1993 computer game developed by CyberDreams, with both titles featuring futuristic vehicle designs associated with industrial designer Syd Mead.

The game's development emphasised three-dimensional polygonal environments, varied track designs and interactive obstacles. In July 1995, Mean Machines Sega highlighted its two-player split-screen mode as a notable feature compared with Sega's Saturn conversion of Daytona USA, which lacked multiplayer support. Contemporary previews also drew attention to the game's different camera perspectives and environmental effects, including moving obstacles and unusual course layouts.

The game was released in Japan on 26 May 1995 under the title Gran Chaser, before appearing internationally as Cyber Speedway.

== Regional differences ==
The game has different soundtracks depending on the region: one by Nextech's Kohji Hayama in Japan and Europe, and another by rock band Bygone Dogs in the United States.

== Reception ==
Reception

Review scores
Publication	Score
Next Generation	3/5
Maximum	2/5
Sega Saturn Magazine	68%
CD Player	5/10

Cyber Speedway received generally mediocre reviews. While critics remarked that the graphics are good and that the two-player split screen mode is a welcome treat, especially given that the Saturn's flagship racer Daytona USA is single-player only, they found fault with the gameplay, particularly the hovercraft handling. Rad Automatic of Sega Saturn Magazine argued that the vehicle's lack of traction is an inaccurate depiction of hovercraft physics, while a reviewer for Maximum felt that the hovercraft concept was a poor one to begin with, since hovercraft handle identically on all surfaces, making for "a predictable, tedious ride." A GamePro critic commented that the game was fun to play but lacked longevity, since all the tracks are easy to master and elements such as the crude cinematics in story mode limit the game's replay appeal.

American magazine Next Generation reviewed the Japanese version as an import, rating it three stars out of five, and stated that "Gran Chaser is good fun, if not all together great."

In Brazil, Cyber Speedway was the third-best-selling Sega Saturn game distributed by Tec Toy, behind Scorcher and Virtua Cop 2, according to a sales ranking compiled by Tec Toy marketing analyst Kleber de Almeida and published by UOL in November 2004.
