= CyberRace =

1993 video game

- Manual front-cover
- Developer(s): Cyberdreams
- Publisher(s): Cyberdreams
- Designer(s): Syd Mead
- Platform(s): MS-DOS
- Release: NA: 1993
- Genre(s): Racing
- Mode(s): Single-player

CyberRace is a futuristic single player racing game developed and published by Cyberdreams in 1993 for MS-DOS. It features flying car vehicles, called sleds, designed by industrial designer Syd Mead.

The 1995 game Cyber Speedway is a spiritual sequel to CyberRace.

== Plot ==
In the game manual the background setting for the game's universe is told. There are two main rivaling empires: Terra and Kaladasia. After the galaxy was nearly destroyed, war battles were replaced with racing competition. The player in the role of Clay Shaw is forced to become a sled pilot for the Terran team, as his girlfriend is held captive by a Terran agent named Dobbs. Terra wants Shaw as a pilot because his father, John Shaw, was a well-known, successful pilot, and Clay is hoped to become equally good.

== Gameplay ==
The player can select strategy options and equipment for the sled before the race. The races take place on different planets which provide the background for the racing circuits. The player must fly the sled along the circuit for several rounds, the number of rounds increasing with progression in the game. The player and computer-generated competitors can use weapons (e.g. missiles) and shields.

Cockpit view during the race.

== Release ==
CyberRace was released in two editions: on six 3½-inch floppy disks and on one Compact Disc. Both packages included a manual, a quick reference card, a small plastic model of a racing sled and a signed card by Syd Mead.

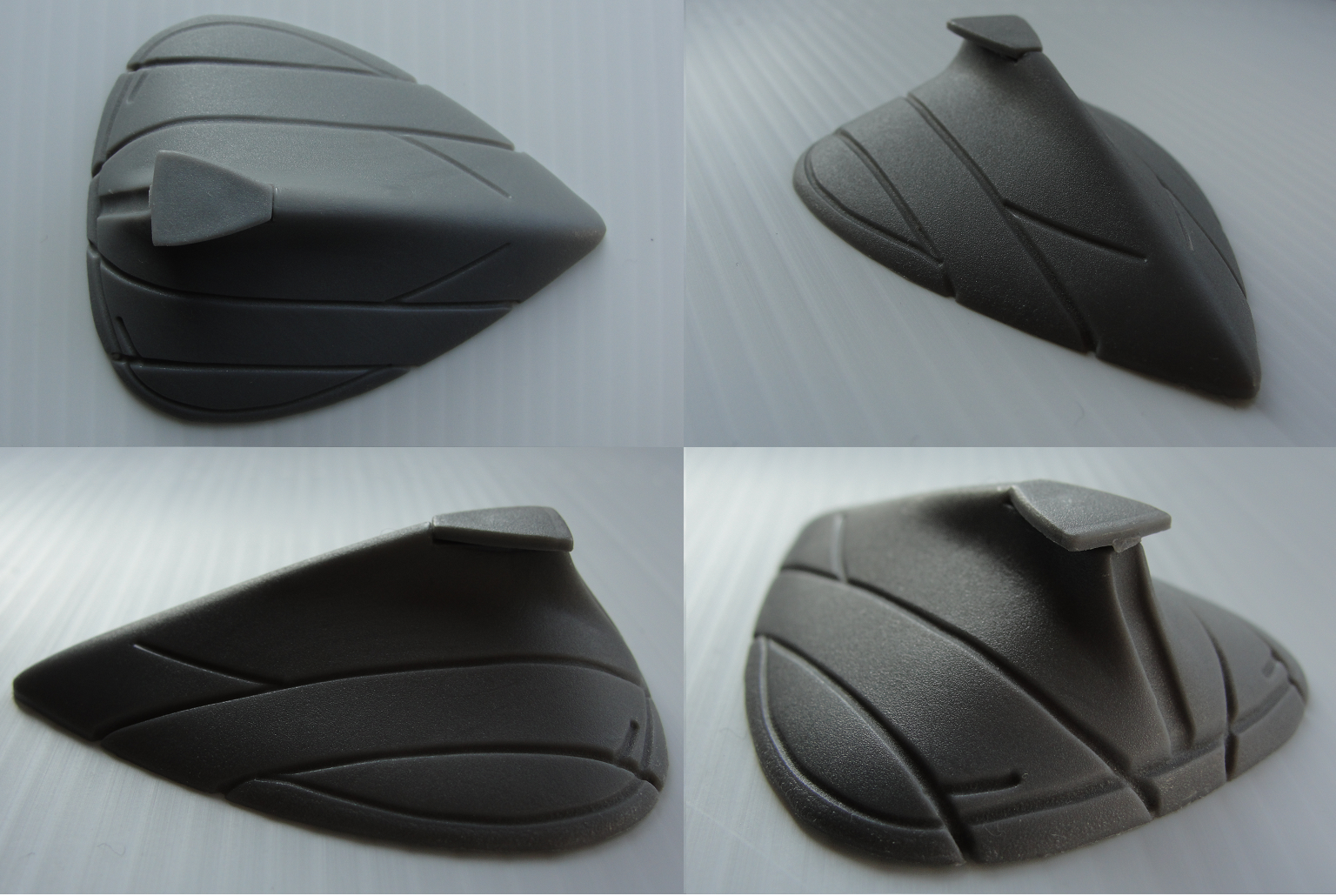
Plastic model of a sled, part of the game package.

== Reception ==
Reception

Review score
Publication	Score
Hyper	75%

Computer Gaming World stated in February 1994 that CyberRace was "primarily action intensive", but that with Mead helping to develop the storyline, "the story itself may actually eclipse game play", with "strong appeal among sci-fi fans and racing enthusiasts". A longer review in March 1994 described the graphics as "spectacular ... amazing" and the racing as "a lot of fun", albeit "fairly easy" after time. It reported, however, that CyberRace did not live up to the hype of a game "from the man who brought you Blade Runner", stating that Mead's influence was only visible in the sled designs and that good voice acting did not compensate for poor writing, non-racing animation, and not enough playtesting. The magazine concluded that "CyberRace is a fun, visually stunning race simulator with a rather weakly constructed and executed narrative framework". In April 1994 the magazine said that "while the racing can be mildly interesting ... an uninteresting plot and characters fail to keep interest, despite some pretty neat artwork".

In 1996, Computer Gaming World declared CyberRace the 39th-worst computer game ever released.
