= Camille Abbott =

American illustrator, art director, and designer

Camille Abbott is an American illustrator, art director, and designer. She received the Lifetime Achievement Award from the Art Directors Guild in 2014.

Abbott received a Bachelor of Fine Arts from Chouinard Art Institute in 1957. In 1960, she became the third woman to join then IATSE Local 790 (Illustrators and Matte Artists). She served as Secretary Treasurer of the local for 42 years. During her career, she drew storyboards and production design drawings for dozens of films including Spaceballs, Flashdance, and Battlestar Galactica. For the film Spaceballs, Abbott worked in the art department as an illustrator. For Career Opportunities Abbott also worked in the art department, but as a production illustrator for the film.

Abbott has lectured as a storyboard and sketch artist at universities including the University of Hawaii, San Diego State University, and the UCLA. Abbott was nominated for Best Costume Design by the NAACP for the play Shaking the Mess out of Misery.

In the mid-1970s, Abbott, along with a small community of parents, founded the first multicultural school in Los Angeles. She continued her work within the education system by heading various committees among four elementary schools, forming a multicultural calendar for them.
