= The Lie (Playhouse 90) =

- Playhouse 90 episode
- Directed by: Alex Segal
- Teleplay by: Ingmar Bergman
- Original air date: April 24, 1973

"The Lie" is an American television play broadcast on April 24, 1973, as the first installment of the CBS Playhouse 90 series. The production was based on a play by Ingmar Bergman. The featured cast, as displayed in the opening credits, included George Segal, Shirley Knight (as Shirley Knight Hopkins), Robert Culp, Victor Buono, William Daniels, Dean Jagger, Louise Lasser, Mary Ann Mobley, and Elizabeth Wilson. The play was a drama depicting the interactions of a group of wealthy people.

The production was nominated for five Primetime Emmy Awards and won four:

- Charles Kreiner and Jan Scott, winner, Best Art Direction or Scenic Design For a Dramatic Program or Feature Length Film, for a Series, a Single Program of a Series or a Special Program
- William M. Klages, winner, Outstanding Achievement in Lighting Direction
- Lewis W. Smith, nominee, Outstanding Achievement in Video Tape Editing
- Charles Kreiner and Jan Scott, winner, Art Decorator and Set Decorator of the Year.
