= Montserrat (Hollywood Television Theatre) =

- Hollywood Television Theatre episode
- Directed by: Lewis Freedman
- Written by: Lillian Hellman
- Original air date: March 2, 1971

"Montserrat" is an American television play broadcast on March 2, 1971, as part of the PBS television series, Hollywood Television Theatre.

== Plot ==
The play occurs in 1812 during Spain's occupation of Venezuela. A Spanish captain, Montserrat, concludes that the occupation is wrong and switches sides to support Simón Bolívar revolution for independence. Monserrate is captured by the Spaniards, and Colonel Izquierdo uses cruel tactics in an effort to compel Montserrat to reveal Bolívar's location. The tactics include taking six strangers from the street and telling them that if they fail to persuade Montserrat to talk the information, they will be killed. In the second half of the play, each of the six strangers pleads his case and is executed.

== Cast ==
- Keir Dullea as Montserrat
- Jack Albertson as Salas Ina
- Hurd Hatfield as Salcedo
- Rip Torn as Colonel Izquierdo
- Earl Holliman as Luhan
- Geraldine Page as Matilde
- Scott Colomby as Ricardo
- Noah Keen as Morales
- Martin Sheen as Antonanzas
- Paul Stevens as Zavala
- Jess Walton as Felisa

== Production ==
The production was based on Lillian Hellman's adaptation of a 1949 French play by Emmanuel Robles.

Lewis Freedman was the producer, and David Friedkin directed Montserrat.

For her work on the production, Jan Scott won the Primetime Emmy Awards for Outstanding Achievement in Art Direction or Scenic Design For a Dramatic Program or Feature Length Film, a Single Program of a Series or a Special Program. Scott's work included a massive, elegant palace set.
