= ADG Excellence in Production Design Awards =

Film and television production design and art direction awards

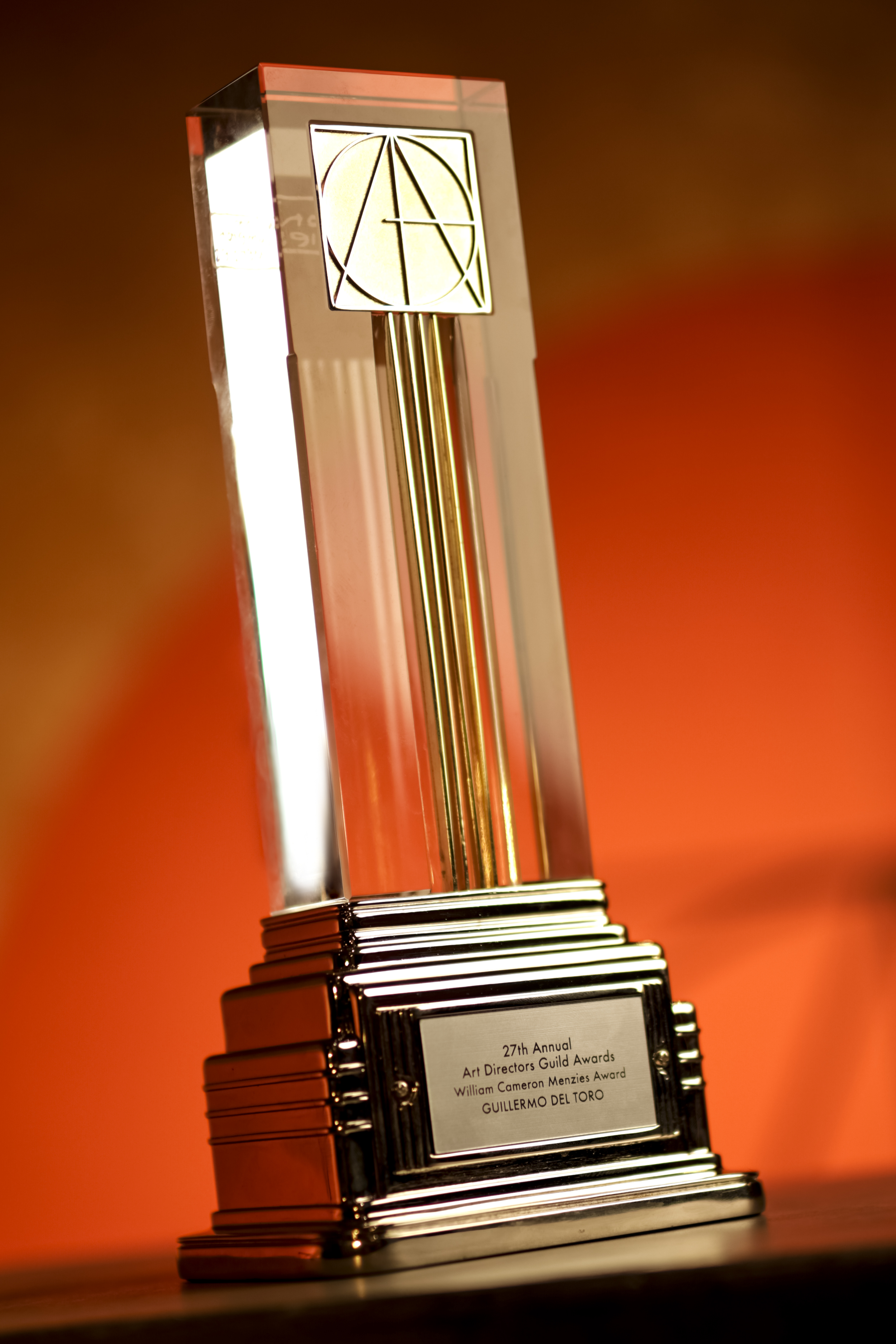
- Awarded for: Excellence in production design and art direction by members of the Art Directors Guild
- Country: United States
- Presented by: Art Directors Guild
- First award: 1996
- Website: adg.org

The ADG Excellence in Production Design Awards are awards presented annually by the Art Directors Guild (ADG) to recognize excellence in production design and art direction in the film and television industries.

== Award Categories ==
All awards have been granted since 1996 unless otherwise indicated.

=== Film ===
- Excellence in Production Design for a Feature Film (1996–1999)*
- Excellence in Production Design for a Period or Fantasy Film (2000–2005)
- Excellence in Production Design for a Contemporary Film (2000–present)
- Excellence in Production Design for a Period Film (2006–present)
- Excellence in Production Design for a Fantasy Film (2006–present)
- Excellence in Production Design for an Animated Film (2017–present)

=== Television ===
- Excellence in Production Design for a TV series (1996–1999)
- Excellence in Production Design for a Single camera series (2000–2007)
- Excellence in Production Design for a One-Hour Single Camera Series (2008–2013)
- Excellence in Production Design for a One-Hour Period or Fantasy Single-camera Television Series (2014–present)
- Excellence in Production Design for a Half-Hour Single Camera Television Series (2008–present)
- Excellence in Production Design for a Multi-Camera, Variety, or Unscripted Series (2000–2013)
- Excellence in Production Design for a Multi-Camera Series (2014–present)
- Excellence in Production Design for a Variety, Competition, Reality, or Game Show Series (2014–2016)
- Excellence in Production Design for an Awards Show, Variety, Music, or Non-Fiction Program (1997–2011)
- Excellence in Production Design for an Awards, Music, or Game Shows (2012–2013)
- Excellence in Production Design for an Awards or Event Special (2014–2016)
- Excellence in Production Design for a Television Movie or Limited Series (1997–present)
- Excellence in Production Design for a Short Format, Live Action Series (2013)
- Excellence in Production Design for a Short Format: Web Series, Music Video or Commercial (2004–present)
- Excellence in Production Design for a Short Format: Music Videos (2022–present)

=== Special awards ===
- Lifetime Achievement Award
- William Cameron Menzies Award (2015–present)
