= Noah Keen =

American actor (1920–2019)

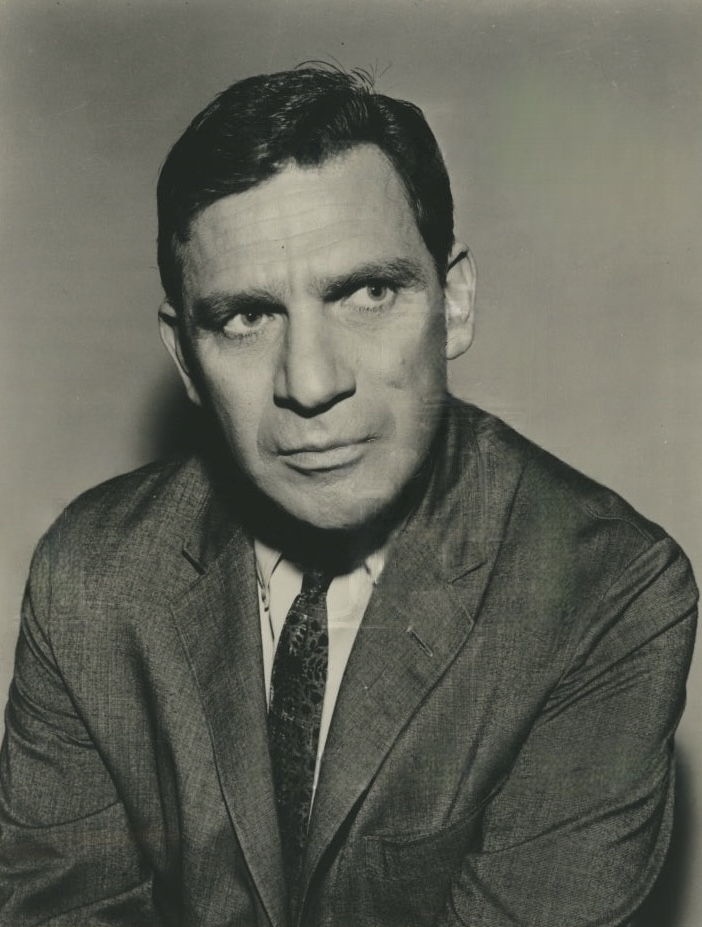
- Keen in Arrest and Trial (1963)
- Born: October 10, 1920; Cincinnati, Ohio, United States
- Died: March 24, 2019 (aged 98)
- Occupation: Actor
- Spouses: Barbara Corday (m. 1972; div. 1974) Gerrianne Raphael (m. 2004)
- Children: 4

Noah Keen (October 10, 1920 – March 24, 2019) was an American film and television actor.

== Biography ==
Keen was born in Cincinnati, Ohio. He fought in World War II as a bombardier in the Army Air Force.

Keen made many guest appearances in television series such as The Twilight Zone in the episodes "The Arrival" and "The Trade-Ins". In 1962 he made two guest appearances on Perry Mason; first as murder victim Harlow Phipps in "The Case of the Crippled Cougar", then as Dr. Stephen Grant in "The Case of the Lurid Letter". In 1962 Keen appeared as Samuel Cole on the TV western The Virginian in the episode titled "The Accomplice". Keen then made two appearances on The Big Valley in the 1965 episode "The Invaders" and again in 1968 in the episode titled "The Prize" as Jim Stanley.

Other series on which he made guest appearances include The Eleventh Hour, Judd, for the Defense, Bonanza, Gidget, Mission: Impossible, The Mod Squad, The Waltons and The Rockford Files. Keen had also appeared in movies such as Battle for the Planet of the Apes and Disorganized Crime. Although he had been acting less frequently since the 1980s, he still made occasional appearances such as a guest appearance on the episode "Johnny Cakes" of The Sopranos. By the time of his retirement from acting, Keen had established himself as a leading character actor, appearing in over 100 television series from 1957 until 2006.

Keen died on March 24, 2019, aged 98.

== Filmography ==
Year	Title	Role	Notes
1957	A Face in the Crowd	Cracker Barrell TV Director	uncredited
1960	Girl of the Night	Al	
1962	The Twilight Zone	Mr. Vance	Season 3 Episode 31: "The Trade-Ins"
1966	A Big Hand for the Little Lady	Sparrow	
1967	The Caper of the Golden Bulls	The Irishman	
1968	The Virginian	Arnold Page	Season 6 Episode 12: "The Barren Ground"
1970	Helen Keller and Her Teacher	Narrator	Voice
1971	Montserrat	Morales	Television film
1971	The Ski Bum	Marty	
1972	The Waltons	David Mann	Season 1 Episode 9: "The Ceremony"
1973	Tom Sawyer	Judge Thatcher	
1973	Battle for the Planet of the Apes	Abe the teacher	
1974	Black Starlet	Phil	
1976	Gable and Lombard	A. Broderick	
1979	The Rockford Files	Dr. Greenberg	The Return of the Black Shadow (aired 17 February 1979)
1989	Disorganized Crime	Farmer	
