= Art Directors Guild Award for Excellence in Production Design for a Single camera series =

The Art Directors Guild Award for Excellence in Production Design for a Single Camera series was an award handed out annually by the Art Directors Guild. It was introduced at the Art Directors Guilds' 5th annual honors in 2001 alongside the award for Excellence in Production Design for a Multi-Camera, Variety, or Unscripted Series - both of which had been spun out of the previously awarded Excellence in Production Design for a TV series award.

The award was given until 2008, after which it was subsequently further split into half-hour and one-hour categories beginning with the 2009 ADG Awards.

== Winners ==
Year	Program	Episode(s)	Nominees	Network
2001 (5th)	The X Files		Corey Kaplan (production designer) Phil Dagort (art director) Sandy Getzler (art director) Steven R. Miller (assistant art director)	FOX
2002 (6th)	Six Feet Under		Marcia Hinds (production designer) Thomas T. Taylor (art director)	HBO
2003 (7th)	Alias		Scott Chambliss (production designer), Cece De Stefano (art director)	ABC
2004 (8th)	Carnivàle		Bernt Amadeus Capra (production designer), Jeremy Cassells (art director)	HBO
2005 (9th)	Desperate Housewives		Thomas Walsh (production designer), Kim Hix (art director), P. Erik Carlson (art director) Steven Samanen (assistant art director)	ABC
2006 (10th)	Rome		Joseph Bennett (production designer), Domenico Sica (art director), Carlo Serafin (art director), Dominic Hyman (art director) Daniela Giovannoni (assistant art director)	HBO
2007 (11th)	Ugly Betty		Mark Worthington (production designer), Jim Wallis (art director) Kathleen Widomski (art director) Charles E. McCarry (art director - new york) Wing Lee (assistant art director - new york)	ABC
2008 (12th)	Mad Men		Dan Bishop (production designer), Christopher Brown (art director)	AMC
