= Roy Forge Smith =

British production designer

Roy Forge Smith (18 May 1929 – 6 February 2017) was a British production designer known for his work in films, such as Monty Python and the Holy Grail, and television, including 44 episodes of the Ghost Whisperer from 2005 to 2007. Smith received two ADG Excellence in Production Design Award nominations for his work on the television movies The Hunley in 1998 and the 2002 CBS biopic, Martin and Lewis. He frequently collaborated with writer and director, John Gray.

Smith was a native of London. He began his career, which spanned more than 40 years in film and television, at the BBC.

Smith was a set designer for the production of Monty Python and the Holy Grail. His numerous British and American film credits as a production designer included work on Far from the Madding Crowd (1967), Jabberwocky (1977), Mrs. Soffel (1984), Bill & Ted's Excellent Adventure (1989), Robin Hood: Men in Tights (1993), Dracula: Dead and Loving It (1995), and the Teenage Mutant Ninja Turtles film trilogy during the early 1990s.

During the 1990s Smith continued to work on feature films such as Richard's Treehouse, Honey I Shrunk the Kids and Katie turning to television in around 2000 designing sets in Ireland for a Hallmark film, in Lithuania for Attila the Hun and in Luxembourg. He often teamed with John Gray, the writer and director, to design the sets for his television films and series. Smith designed the sets for seven of Gray's television movies, including The Hunley (1998) (Charleston South Carolina) for which his ingenuity about the construction and the re-creation of the Hunley impressed historians; The Day Lincoln Was Shot, in which he constructed a Civil War era Richmond Virginia White House in an historic building and a replica of the theatre in which he was shot and Martin and Lewis (2002). In 2005, Gray created the CBS series, Ghost Whisperer, supernatural drama series starring Jennifer Love Hewitt. Smith served as the production designer for 44 episodes from 2005 to 2007 during the show's first two seasons.

Roy Forge Smith died on 6 February 2017, at the age of 87. His death was announced by Gray, who issued a tribute, saying, "Roy was the master of doing things simply...It's the biggest and most important thing I learned from him (among many many things); in the midst of complexity, look for the simplicity."
