= William Cameron Menzies Award =

Annual US film and television award

- Country: United States
- Presented by: Art Directors Guild
- First award: 2015
- Website: adg.org

The William Cameron Menzies Award is a special honor presented by the Art Directors Guild (ADG) to individuals whose work has significantly advanced the art of visual storytelling in film and television. Named after the pioneering American production designer and director William Cameron Menzies, the award recognizes individuals who have contributed extraordinary achievements in production design or visual storytelling that reflect Menzies' innovative legacy.

== Background ==
William Cameron Menzies (1896–1957) was an acclaimed American art director and filmmaker, widely considered one of the founding figures of modern production design. He was the first person to be credited as a "production designer" for his work on Gone with the Wind (1939), a title created to reflect his overall visual authority on the project.

The Menzies award is not given annually, but on a select basis to recipients whose contributions to the visual arts in film or television are deemed truly outstanding.

== Recipients ==
The William Cameron Menzies Award has been presented to the following recipients:

List of Recipients
Year	Recipient(s)	Contribution / Reason	Reference
2015	Robert Osborne	For preserving and celebrating classic cinema as the longtime host of Turner Classic Movies	
2017	Ron Clements and John Musker	For championing the art of animation through films like The Little Mermaid, Aladdin, and Moana	
2020	Syd Mead	For his visionary concept art in films like Blade Runner, TRON, and Aliens	
2022	Denis Villeneuve	For visually compelling direction in Dune and Blade Runner 2049	
2023	Guillermo del Toro	For richly detailed fantasy environments in films like Pan’s Labyrinth and The Shape of Water	

== See also ==
- List of art awards
