= Patrizia von Brandenstein =

American production designer

- Born: April 15, 1943 (age 82); Arizona, U.S.
- Occupation: Production designer
- Years active: 1972-present

Patrizia von Brandenstein (born April 15, 1943) is an American production designer. She has shown versatility in creating sets for both lavish historical films and glossy contemporary fare. She has been nominated for the Academy Award for Best Production Design three times, winning for Amadeus (1984).

She was born in Arizona to German Russian emigrant parents. Her education abroad closed with two years as an apprentice at the famed Comédie Française. She started with the off-Broadway scene of 1960s New York at the Actors Studio and La MaMa as a seamstress, prop maker and scene painter. 1966 saw the real start of her career in design with an eight-year stay creating costumes and sets at the American Conservatory Theater in San Francisco under William Ball. She also met future husband and fellow production designer Stuart Wurtzel. She has designed movies in a wide range of subjects, styles, and periods: from the low-budget, break-dancing musical Beat Street to the expensive plutonium-plant melodrama Silkwood.

Director Neil Burger, in his DVD commentary for Limitless, singles out von Brandenstein for her excellent work on the film.

== Selected filmography ==
Brandenstein has won an Academy Award for Best Art Direction and has been nominated for two more:

Won

- Amadeus (1984)

Nominated

- Ragtime (1981)
- The Untouchables (1987)
