= Karen TenEyck =

American scenic and graphic designer

Karen TenEyck (born 1958) is an American scenic and graphic designer who has worked in theatre, opera, film, and TV.

== Early life and education ==
TenEyck was raised in Wilmington, Delaware. She attended Kutztown State College in Pennsylvania and earned a degree in advertising and graphic design.

== Career ==
After graduation TenEyck worked for various advertising companies. She attended the Yale School of Drama and graduated in 1991. She then worked in the field of advertising and later moved to New York City. In 2013 she lived in California.

=== Scene design ===
TenEyck designed sets for theatrical productions for eleven years. Her style is generally spare and simple, but not to the point of abstraction. Some of her sets are more intricate, such as her design for Richard Greenberg's adaptation of Triumph of Love.

In addition to physical scene design, TenEyck has also developed techniques in virtual projection design while working for the Mabou Mines theatre company. She used these techniques on the Shakespeare Festival of LA's rendition of Julius Caesar, where modern-esque campaign projections for Caesar were displayed against the backdrop of Los Angeles City Hall. Both her work at Mabou Mines and Los Angeles won her awards for digital/graphic work.

=== Film ===
After working in theatre for 11 years, TenEyck did graphic work for the film Anger Management, and since then has worked on more than 30 other film titles. Some of her more recent film projects include graphics and branding for Water for Elephants, Captain America: The First Avenger, and Lincoln.

== Awards ==
- American Theatre Wing award for Special Effects
  - An Epidog ToRoNaDa Studio, New York NY 1996
- Drama Logue Award for Scenic Design
  - The Triumph of Love South Coast Repertory, Costa Mesa California 1997
  - Pygmalion South Coast Repertory, Costa Mesa California 1997
- Garland Award for Set Design
  - Julius Caesar, Los Angeles City Hall, Los Angeles, California, 1998
- Included in the Autry Museum of Western Heritage's exhibition on Chinese-American life since the 1790s
  - On Gold Mountain, Irvine Barclay Theatre, Irvine California 2000
