= The Summer of Ben Tyler =

1996 television film by Arthur Allan Seidelman

- Promotional poster
- Written by: Robert Inman
- Directed by: Arthur Allan Seidelman
- Starring: James Woods; Elizabeth McGovern; Len Cariou; Julia McIlvaine; Charles Mattocks; Kevin Isola; Clifton James; Anita Gillette
- Composer: Van Dyke Parks
- Country of origin: United States
- Original language: English

Production
- Executive producers: Richard Welsh; Ronnie D. Clemmer; Bill Pace; Richard P. Kughn; Sharon Cicero
- Producer: Dan Witt
- Cinematography: Neil Roach
- Editor: Toni Morgan
- Running time: 134 minutes
- Production company: Hallmark Hall of Fame Productions

Original release
- Network: CBS
- Release: December 15, 1996

The Summer of Ben Tyler is an American drama television film that premiered on CBS on December 15, 1996, as part of the Hallmark Hall of Fame anthology series. The film is directed by Arthur Allan Seidelman and written by Robert Inman. It stars James Woods as an up-and-coming lawyer, alongside Elizabeth McGovern, Len Cariou, Julia McIlvaine, Charles Mattocks, Kevin Isola, Clifton James, and Anita Gillette. Woods received a Golden Globe Award nomination for his performance.

== Cast ==
- James Woods as Temple Rayburn
- Elizabeth McGovern as Celia Rayburn
- Len Cariou as Spencer Maitland
- Julia McIlvaine as Nell Rayburn
- Charles Mattocks as Ben Tyler
- Kevin Isola as Junius Maitland
- Clifton James as Sam Thompkins
- Anita Gillette as Suellen
- Millie Perkins as Doris
- Jack Gilpin as Carter Glenn
- Novella Nelson as Rosetta Tyler
- Ed Grady as Dr. Ringgold
- Ronn Carroll as Judge Kragen
- Gregory Perrelli as Scooter Maitland
- Judith Ivey as Narrator

== Reception ==
=== Critical response ===
Ray Richmond of Variety gave the film a positive review, writing that "a sumptuously produced gem of a film with a refreshing message of moral heroism, The Summer of Ben Tyler is as poignant, heartwarming and superbly acted as any of the 189 previous Hallmark Hall of Fame productions." John J. O'Connor of The New York Times concluded his review by stating that the film "gets the familiar treatment: a fine cast and top-notch direction. If only the underlying story weren't so insufferably patronizing."

=== Awards and nominations ===
Year	Award	Category	Recipient(s)	Result
1997	1st Golden Satellite Awards	Best Miniseries or TV Film	The Summer of Ben Tyler	Nominated
1997	1st Golden Satellite Awards	Best Actor – Miniseries or TV Film	James Woods	Nominated
1997	54th Golden Globe Awards	Best Actor – Miniseries or Television Film	James Woods	Nominated
1997	1st Art Directors Guild Awards	Excellence in Production Design Award – Television	Jan Scott; Tim Eckel	Nominated
1997	18th Youth in Film Awards	Best Performance in a TV Movie or Mini Series: Young Actress	Julia McIlvaine	Nominated
1997	18th Youth in Film Awards	Best Family TV Movie or Mini Series: Network	The Summer of Ben Tyler	Nominated
1998	23rd Humanitas Awards	90 Minute or Longer Network or Syndicated Television	The Summer of Ben Tyler	Nominated
1998	50th Writers Guild of America Awards	Best Long Form – Original	Robert Inman	Won
