= Art Directors Guild Hall of Fame =

Hall of fame in California

The Art Directors Guild Hall of Fame was established by the Art Directors Guild in 2005 to recognize and honor the accomplishments and contributions of significant art directors and production designers in the film industry.

== Inductees ==
=== 2005 ===
- Wilfred Buckland (1866–1946)
- Richard Day (1896–1972)
- John DeCuir (1918–1991)
- Anton Grot (1884–1974)
- Boris Leven (1908–1986)
- William Cameron Menzies (1896–1957)
- Van Nest Polglase (1898–1968)

=== 2006 ===
- John Box (1920–2005)
- Hans Dreier (1885–1966)
- Cedric Gibbons (1892–1960)
- Jan Scott (1915–2003)
- Alexandre Trauner (1906–1993)

=== 2007 ===
- Hilyard M. Brown (1910–2002)
- Henry Bumstead (1915–2006)
- Carroll Clark (1894–1968)
- Stephen Goosson (1889–1973)
- Harry Horner (1910–1994)

=== 2008 ===
- Edward Carfagno (1907–1996)
- Stephen B. Grimes (1927–1988)
- Dale Hennesy (1926–1981)
- James Trittipo (1928–1971)
- Lyle R. Wheeler (1905–1990)

=== 2009 ===
- Ted Haworth (1917–1993)
- Joseph McMillan "Mac" Johnson (1912–1990)
- Romain Johnston (1929–1995)
- John Meehan (1902–1963)
- Harold Michelson (1920–2007)

=== 2010 ===
- Malcolm F. Brown (1903–1967)
- Bob Keene (1947–2003)
- Ferdinando Scarfiotti (1941–1994)

=== 2011 ===
- Alexander Golitzen (Golitsyn) (1908–2005)
- Albert Heschong (1919–2001)
- Eugène Lourié (1903–1991)

=== 2012 ===
- Robert F. Boyle (1909–2010)
- William S. Darling (1882–1964)
- Alfred Junge (1886–1964)

=== 2013 ===
- E. Preston Ames (1906–1983)
- Richard Macdonald (1919–1993)
- Edward S. Stephenson (1917–2011)

=== 2014 ===
- Robert Clatworthy (1911–1992)
- Harper Goff (1911–1993)
- J. Michael Riva (1948–2012)

=== 2015 ===
- John Gabriel Beckman (1898–1989)
- Charles Lisanby (1924–2013)
- Walter H. Tyler (1909–1990)

=== 2016 ===
- Carmen Dillon (1908–2000)
- Patricia Norris (1931–2015)
- Dorothea Holt Redmond (1910–2009)
- Dianne Wager (1937–2011)

=== 2017 ===
- Gene Allen (1918–2015)

=== 2019 ===
- Ben Carré (1883–1978)
- Anthony Masters (1919–1990)

=== 2020 ===
- Roland Anderson (1903–1989)
- William J. Creber (1931–2019)

== See also ==
- Art Directors Guild
