= Stuart Wurtzel =

American art director

- Born: August 9, 1940 (age 85); Newark, New Jersey, United States
- Occupation: Art director
- Years active: 1975-present

Stuart Wurtzel (born August 9, 1940) is an American art director. He was nominated for an Academy Award in the category Best Art Direction for the film Hannah and Her Sisters.

== Selected filmography ==
- Hannah and Her Sisters (1986)
