= Art Directors Guild =

Movie and television professionals labor union

- The Art Directors Guild
- Abbreviation: ADG
- Nickname: IATSE Local 800
- Merged into: Local 816 (Scenic, Title & Graphic Artists), Local 847 (Set Designers & Model Makers), and Local 790 (Illustrators & Matte Artists)
- Founded: 1937
- Headquarters: 11969 Ventura Blvd. 2nd Floor; Studio City, California, 91604, United States
- Location: United States
- Members: 2,966 (2025)
- President: Dina Lipton
- National Executive Director: Joel Cohen
- Parent organization: International Alliance of Theatrical Stage Employees
- Affiliations: AFL–CIO, IATSE
- Website: www.adg.org

The Art Directors Guild (ADG; IATSE Local 800) is a labor union and local of the International Alliance of Theatrical and Stage Employees (IATSE) representing 2,966 motion picture and television professionals in the United States and Canada.

The ADG's sponsored activities include the annual ADG Excellence in Production Design Awards, the professional quarterly news magazine Perspective, technology training programs, and a film society.

== Membership ==
Local 800 has four main craft classifications:

1. Art Directors (including Production Designers)
2. Scenic, Title and Graphic Artists
3. Illustrators and Matte Artists
4. Set Designers and Model Makers

In addition, the ADG has recently included previs artists into their membership.

Individual crafts represented by the ADG:

- Production designers
- Art directors
- Assistant art directors
- Set designers
- Graphic artists
- Illustrators
- Matte artists
- Model makers
- Scenic artists
- Previs artists

== Origins ==
=== Art Directors Guild ===
The Art Directors Guild was originally named the Society of Motion Picture Art Directors (SMPAD), which was founded by 59 Art Directors on May 6, 1937, at a meeting at the Hollywood Roosevelt Hotel.

After World War II, many "below the line" industry labor organizations, including SMPAD, signed on with the IATSE for overall union representation. SMPAD became more active, grew in membership, and expanded opportunities as television developed. In 1967 the Society included "television" to their name before settling on its current moniker, the "Art Directors Guild" in 1998.

The Art Directors Guild included only men until 1971. Production designer Polly Platt was the first woman inducted into the Guild, in 1971. Toby Carr Rafelson was the second woman inducted.

==== Scenic, Title and Graphic Artists ====
The creation of its own local (formerly known as Local 816) in March 1949 marked the first time the Hollywood Scenic Artists and Title Artists had its own local representing its unique needs. Previously, the members were part of Local 644 of the Conference of Studio Unions (CSU) working in film and theater. The overwhelming majority of Local 644's membership, however, had been made up of set painters and paperhangers and included set designers as well. It was not until the dissolution of the CSU after a long series of bitterly contested strikes that the scenic artists were able to organize exclusively. Those artists had been pioneers in their field, responsible for devising and developing the methods used to create representational scenery unsurpassed anywhere in the world.

The size and strength of the local grew with the inclusion of television contracts in the early 1950s. Television, at that time, was in effect an extension of live theater and required a lot of painted two-dimensional scenery instead of the three-dimensional sets used in film. As the nature of television scenery changed, the responsibilities of the television scenic artist broadened to include those of the set painter. Local 816 was the only local in the entertainment industry that worked in all three major areas of the business: film, television and theater.

In January 2003, the 850 members of ADG merged with the 650 member Scenic, Title and Graphic Artists to form the Art Directors Guild & Scenic, Title and Graphic Artists.

==== Illustrators, Storyboard Artists and Matte Artists ====
In the 1930s, the Illustrators and Matte Artists were part of the Federation of Motion Picture Crafts. By 1941 they became a part of the Conference of Studio Unions. In 1945, they received their own chartered local, Local 790 in IATSE, which by the 1950s became the dominant labor organization representing the motion picture and television job categories working behind the camera.

On July 1, 2008, under the orders of IATSE International President Thomas C. Short, Local 790 Illustrators & Matte Artists and Local 847 Set Designers and Model Makers were merged into Local 800.

== Awards ==
- The ADG Excellence in Production Design Awards are presented annually by the Art Directors Guild to "recognize excellence in production design and art direction in the film and television industries".
- The ADG Lifetime Achievement Award is presented to individuals who have been outstanding in the four crafts of the Art Directors Guild.
- The William Cameron Menzies Award recognizes individuals who have contributed extraordinary achievements in production design or visual storytelling that reflect Menzies' innovative legacy.

== Hall of fame ==
The Art Directors Guild established its Hall of Fame in 2005 to honour the contributions of significant past production designers and art directors. The Hall of Fame inducts new members annually, with the first group formally inducted at the 9th Annual Excellence in Production Design Awards ceremony on February 12, 2005.

== Archive ==
The Academy Film Archive houses the Art Directors Guild Collection, which consists of recordings from events and fifteen interviews conducted in 2012 and 2014 with scenic artists in which they discuss their profession and projects.
