= Jan Scott =

American production designer and art director (1914–2003)

- Born: September 26, 1914; Water Valley, Mississippi
- Died: April 17, 2003 (aged 88); Hollywood, California, U.S.
- Education: University of Chicago; Art Institute of Chicago; Massachusetts Institute of Technology
- Occupations: Production designer Art director

Jan Spencer Scott (September 26, 1914 – April 17, 2003) was an American production designer and art director. She won 11 Primetime Emmy Awards, more than any woman in the history of television and more than any other production designers. Scott was nominated for Emmy Awards a record total of 29 times. She was also a president of the Society of Motion Picture Art Directors and also served as a vice-president, second vice-president and governor of the Academy of Television Arts & Sciences.

== Early years ==
Scott was born in Water Valley, Mississippi, in 1914. Her family moved to Carbondale, Illinois, while Scott was an infant. Her father worked for a railroad, and her mother was an artist who died when she Scott was one-and-a-half or two years old. She attended Carbondale Community High School and then studied architecture at the University of Chicago.

== Art directing ==
=== NBC Chicago ===
While still studying at the University of Chicago, Scott began working at NBC in Chicago. She did design, scenic painting, carpentry, and lighting work for local television programs. Among others, she worked on a news show with Hugh Downs and a cooking show. She did internships at WPTZ in Philadelphia and another at MIT.

=== NBC New York ===
In 1955, Scott moved to New York City where she worked as an art director for NBC. In New York, she worked on live drama shows, including NBC Opera Theatre. She also painted sets for the Metropolitan Opera

Her first prolonged assignment at NBC was as the art director on the DuPont Show of the Month, an anthology drama series that began production in 1957. On the DuPont show, she worked closely with directors George Roy Hill, Fielder Cook, and Franklin J. Schaffner. She also worked with Schaffer on Hallmark Hall of Fame, including a production of A Doll's House in 1959.

She received an Emmy nomination for her art direction on the 1958 production Hans Brinker and the Silver Skates, broadcast as part of the Hallmark Hall of Fame series. For Hans Brinker, she designed an ice rink in Brooklyn. She was also nominated on her work for Big Deal in Loredo.

=== 1960s and 1970s ===
In 1960, she worked on Sidney Lumet's Emmy-nominated production of Sacco-Vanzetti Story. Scott's work on that production included the courtroom and the jail.

She worked on a television productions of several musicals in the late 1960s, including Brigadoon, Carousel, Kismet, and Kiss Me Kate. She won Emmy Awards for her work on Kismet and Kiss Me Kate.

She won her third Emmy Award for the 1970 CBS Playhouse production of Shadow Game, a drama directed by Paul Bogart set against the 1965 Northeast blackout. She also worked that year on the PBS courtroom drama The Andersonville Trial directed by George C. Scott.

In 1972, she art directed for the PBS production The Scarecrow. Scott later said that it was her favorite production. Her work included interiors for a large New England house.

In 1974, she worked on The Lie for Playhouse 90, another production for which she won two Emmy Awards.

She won three Emmy Awards for her work on the ABC mini-series Eleanor and Franklin (1976) and its sequel Eleanor and Franklin: The White House Years (1977). The two mini-series won a total of 17 Emmy Awards.

In 1976, she worked on the Roots miniseries. She stayed for the first six episodes. She left the production due to conflicts with Hutu members of the cast.

Other notable works in the late 1970s included The Gathering (1977) and Orphan Train.

She moved to Los Angeles in the 1970s, purchasing in a house in the Hollywood Hills.

=== 1980s and 1990s ===
She next won an Emmy Award for her work on the Evergreen (1985), a miniseries that spanned the history of a Jewish family over a 50-year period. Evergreen was shot partly in Israel and partly in New York's Lower East Side. She won an Emmy Award for Evergreen. She also won Emmy Awards for Foxfire (1987), I'll Be Home for Christmas (1988), and Harvest of Fire (1996).

=== Later years ===
Scott died in 2003 at age 88 at her home in the Hollywood Hills. She was posthumously inducted into the Art Directors Guild Hall of Fame in 2006.

== Selected filmography ==
=== Television ===
- The Kaiser Aluminum Hour (1956, scenic design) (Emmy nominee)
- Hans Brinker and the Silver Skates (1958, art direction) (Emmy nominee)
- A Doll's House (1959) (Emmy nominee)
- Sacco-Vanzetti Story (1960)
- The DuPont Show of the Week (1961, art director) (Emmy nominee)
- Theatre '62 (1962) (Emmy nominee)
- Carousel (1967, art director)
- Kismet (1967, art director)(Emmy winner)
- Kiss Me Kate (1968, art director) (Emmy winner)
- Shadow Game (1970, art director) (Emmy winner)
- The Andersonville Trial (1970)
- Montserrat (1971, art director) (Emmy nominee)
- The Scarecrow (1972, art director) (Emmy winner)
- Another Part of the Forest (1973, art director) (Emmy nominee)
- The Lie (1974, art director) (Emmy winner)
- Trilogy of Terror (1975)
- Eleanor and Franklin (1976) (Emmy winner)
- Eleanor and Franklin: The White House Years (1977) (Emmy winner)
- Roots, Part II (1977) (Emmy nominee)
- The Gathering (1977, art direction) (Emmy nominee)
- Orphan Train (1979)
- Studs Lonigan (1979, art direction) (Emmy winner)
- Marilyn: The Untold Story (1981, art direction) (Emmy winner)
- Evergreen (1985, production designer) (Emmy winner)
- The Long Hot Summer (1986, art direction) (Emmy nominee)
- Foxfire (1987, art direction) (Emmy winner)
- I'll Be Home for Christmas (1988, art direction) (Emmy winner)
- The Kennedys of Massachusetts (1990)
- Cruel Doubt (1992, art direction)(Emmy nominee)
- Harvest of Fire (1996, art direction) (Emmy winner)
- The Summer of Ben Tyler (1996)
- The Love Letter (1998)
- Grace and Glorie (1998)

=== Feature films ===
- The World of Henry Orient (1964, production designer)
- The End (1978)
- Rich and Famous (1981)
- Grandview, U.S.A. (1984, production designer)

== See also ==
- Art Directors Guild Hall of Fame
