= List of Grounded for Life characters =

Back row: Walt, Claudia, Sean, Lily, Eddie; Front row: Jimmy, Henry

The Following is a list of characters from the sitcom Grounded for Life.

== Characters ==
=== Sean Finnerty ===
Sean Finnerty
- Grounded for Life character
- First appearance: Lily B. Goode
- Last appearance: Hello, Goodbye
- Portrayed by: Donal Logue

In-universe information
- Nicknames: Seany, Cappy
- Gender: Male
- Occupation: Subway Electrician, Bartender
- Family: Walt Finnerty (father); Catherine Collins Finnerty (mother, deceased); Eddie Finnerty (brother); Paddy Finnerty (grandfather, deceased)
- Spouse: Claudia Finnerty
- Children: Lily Finnerty (daughter); Jimmy Finnerty (son); Henry Finnerty (son); Gracie Finnerty (daughter)

Sean Finnerty (Donal Logue) - Sean initially worked in the city lines as an electrician. In the later seasons, he owns and operates The Red Boot Pub with his brother Eddie. A Red Boot Pub dartboard can be found in the Finnerty household in the living room. The father of three (later four) kids, Sean also deals with his judgmental father, his irresponsible brother, and the head nun/principal at his children's school, Sister Helen. Sean often gets into trouble with his irresponsible brother. In many episodes he is depicted as a hothead and he has a lot of difficulty parenting, because he was only eighteen when Lily was born. He is also shown in many episodes to be a skilled guitar player, with him and Eddie having been in a band together in their youth.

=== Claudia Finnerty ===
Claudia Finnerty
- Grounded for Life character
- First appearance: Lily B. Goode
- Last appearance: Hello, Goodbye
- Portrayed by: Megyn Price

In-universe information
- Nicknames: Claud, Baby (by Sean)
- Gender: Female
- Occupation: Restaurant hostess
- Family: Tony Bustamante (father); Maureen Bustamante (mother)
- Spouse: Sean Finnerty
- Children: Lily Finnerty (daughter); Jimmy Finnerty (son); Henry Finnerty (son); Gracie Finnerty (daughter)
- Relatives: Sal Bustamante (uncle)

Claudia Finnerty (née Bustamante) (Megyn Price) - Claudia got pregnant with Lily in high school and ended up marrying Lily's father, Sean Finnerty. She has a job as a hostess at a SoHo restaurant and in later seasons takes classes at Wadsworth College. She is often underappreciated, but is able to make that known. She and Sean's brother, Eddie, run into many conflicts throughout the series. At the beginning of the fifth season, Sean impregnates her again and she gives birth to a girl named Rose in the finale. She seems to be more understanding and forgiving of Lily's mistakes and is generally more level-headed than Sean throughout the series. She is of partial Italian descent.

=== Eddie Finnerty ===
Edwin Finnerty
- Grounded for Life character
- First appearance: Lily B. Goode
- Last appearance: Hello, Goodbye
- Portrayed by: Kevin Corrigan

In-universe information
- Gender: Male
- Occupation: Bartender
- Family: Walt Finnerty (father); Catherine Collins Finnerty (mother, deceased); Sean Finnerty (brother); Paddy Finnerty (grandfather, deceased)
- Relatives: Claudia Finnerty (sister-in-law); Lily Finnerty (niece); Jimmy Finnerty (nephew); Henry Finnerty (nephew); Gracie Finnerty (niece)

Edwin "Eddie" Finnerty (Kevin Corrigan) - Eddie is Sean's younger brother who is carefree and often gets himself into trouble. He is always in the Finnerty house eating their food and watching their TV. He seems to have many "associates" and "connections" of various types and often comes up with ill-advised and sometimes illegal schemes. He has been caught using Sean and Claudia's house for some of his antics, such as one time hosting a casino night and another using it to film a pornographic film. When he and Sean bought the Red Boot Pub, he planned to burn it down for the insurance money. It is implied throughout the series that he is involved in illegal activity.

=== Lily Finnerty ===
Lily Finnerty
- Grounded for Life character
- First appearance: Lily B. Goode
- Last appearance: Hello, Goodbye
- Portrayed by: Lynsey Bartilson

In-universe information
- Nickname: Lilipad
- Gender: Female
- Family: Sean Finnerty (father); Claudia Finnerty (mother); Jimmy Finnerty (brother); Henry Finnerty (brother); Gracie Finnerty (sister)
- Relatives: Walt Finnerty (grandfather); Catherine Collins Finnerty (grandmother, deceased); Tony Bustamante (grandfather); Maureen Bustamante (grandmother); Paddy Finnerty (great-grandfather, deceased); Eddie Finnerty (uncle); Sal Bustamante (greatuncle)

Lily Finnerty (Lynsey Bartilson) (14–18 years old) - The redhead selfish teenage daughter who is often at odds with her parents. She usually blames her parents for all her problems, mostly on the grounds that they had her so young, and that her mom is still attractive. Although she first finds him annoying, she later falls in love with her next-door neighbor, Brad O'Keefe, and they have an on-again, off-again relationship. Lily meets a boy named Dean in the episode "Bang on the Drum" and begins to date him from then to the eleventh episode of season three, in which she gets together with Brad on her sixteenth birthday. They continue to date throughout the rest of the show, and their relationship, and its problems, are often central points of the episodes. Throughout the series, it is shown that she loves to dance.

=== Jimmy Finnerty ===
Jimmy Finnerty
- Grounded for Life character
- First appearance: Lily B. Goode
- Last appearance: Hello, Goodbye
- Portrayed by: Griffin Frazen

In-universe information
- Nicknames: Jimmy, Jim
- Gender: male
- Family: Sean Finnerty (father); Claudia Finnerty (mother); Lily Finnerty (sister); Henry Finnerty (brother); Gracie Finnerty (sister)
- Relatives: Walt Finnerty (grandfather); Catherine Collins Finnerty (grandmother, deceased); Tony Bustamante (grandfather); Maureen Bustamante (grandmother); Paddy Finnerty (great-grandfather, deceased); Eddie Finnerty (uncle); Sal Bustamante (great-uncle)

James Francis "Jimmy" Finnerty (Griffin Frazen) (11–15 years old) - The black sheep of the family, Jimmy's choices are not always accepted by his parents (such as choosing to become a vegetarian). Thus, he often confides in his Uncle Eddie. Many comparisons are made between the two characters on the show, most notably in the third season episode Who Are You? where he pretends to shoplift in a desperate grab for attention. The reason he gets so little attention is that unlike his siblings he causes the least trouble. He is arguably the most sensible and intelligent of the characters.

=== Henry Finnerty ===
Henry Finnerty
- Grounded for Life character
- First appearance: Lily B. Goode
- Last appearance: Space Camp Oddity
- Portrayed by: Jake Burbage

In-universe information
- Gender: Male
- Family: Sean Finnerty (father); Claudia Finnerty (mother); Lily Finnerty (sister); Jimmy Finnerty (brother); Gracie Finnerty (sister)
- Relatives: Walt Finnerty (grandfather); Katherine Finnerty (grandmother, deceased); Tony Bustamante (grandfather); Maureen Bustamante (grandmother); Paddy Finnerty (great-grandfather, deceased); Eddie Finnerty (uncle); Sal Bustamante (great-uncle)

Henry Finnerty (Jake Burbage) (8–12 years old) - The youngest son of the family, Henry, disappeared at the beginning of the fifth season when actor Jake Burbage left to move back east with his family. He is actually never seen during the fifth season, but he is, however, mentioned several times, notably in the episode "Hello, Goodbye" when Claudia says to Walt that Henry is "...around here someplace,". Henry is shown to be a "loose cannon", often getting himself into trouble for being extremely impressionable and curious.

=== Brad O'Keefe ===
Bradley O'Keefe
- Grounded for Life character
- First appearance: Lily B. Goode
- Last appearance: Hello, Goodbye
- Portrayed by: Bret Harrison

In-universe information
- Gender: Male
- Family: Dan O'Keefe (father); Connie O'Keefe (mother)

Bradley "Brad" O'Keefe (Bret Harrison) (14–18 years old) - The sweet, smart but socially inept neighbor, who later becomes Lily's boyfriend at the end of the third season. He is a science nerd and is part of the school club "Sciencenauts".

=== Walt Finnerty ===
Walt Finnerty
- Grounded for Life character
- First appearance: Lily B. Goode
- Last appearance: Hello, Goodbye
- Portrayed by: Richard Riehle

In-universe information
- Gender: Male
- Family: Paddy Finnerty (father, deceased); Sean Finnerty (son); Eddie Finnerty (son)
- Spouse: Catherine Collins Finnerty (deceased)
- Relatives: Lily Finnerty (granddaughter); Jimmy Finnerty (grandson); Henry Finnerty (grandson); Gracie Finnerty (granddaughter)

Walt Finnerty (Richard Riehle) is Sean and Eddie's father. He's a widower and often comes to the house or the bar to see his kids and grandkids. He's very judgmental, especially of his own sons and is shown to be all but the ideal father and lacks in parental skills (scaring his children when they were young or making his two grandsons dig a deep hole for no reason).

=== Gracie Finnerty ===
Gracie Finnerty
- Grounded for Life character
- First appearance: Hello, Goodbye
- Last appearance: Hello, Goodbye

In-universe information
- Gender: Female
- Family: Sean Finnerty (father); Claudia Finnerty (mother); Lily Finnerty (sister); Jimmy Finnerty (brother); Henry Finnerty (brother)

Gracie Finnerty - The series finale ends with Claudia giving birth to Rose who they later rename Gracie after many incorrectly believed her to be named after a certain movie character, bringing the number of Finnerty children to four at the end of the series. She was born on Lily's high school graduation day, in June 2005.
