= Devil's Haircut =

Devil's Haircut may refer to:

- "Devil's Haircut" an episode of Grounded for Life, 2001
- "Devils Haircut", a 1996 song by Beck from the album Odelay
