= Jack Dodson =

American actor (1931–1994)

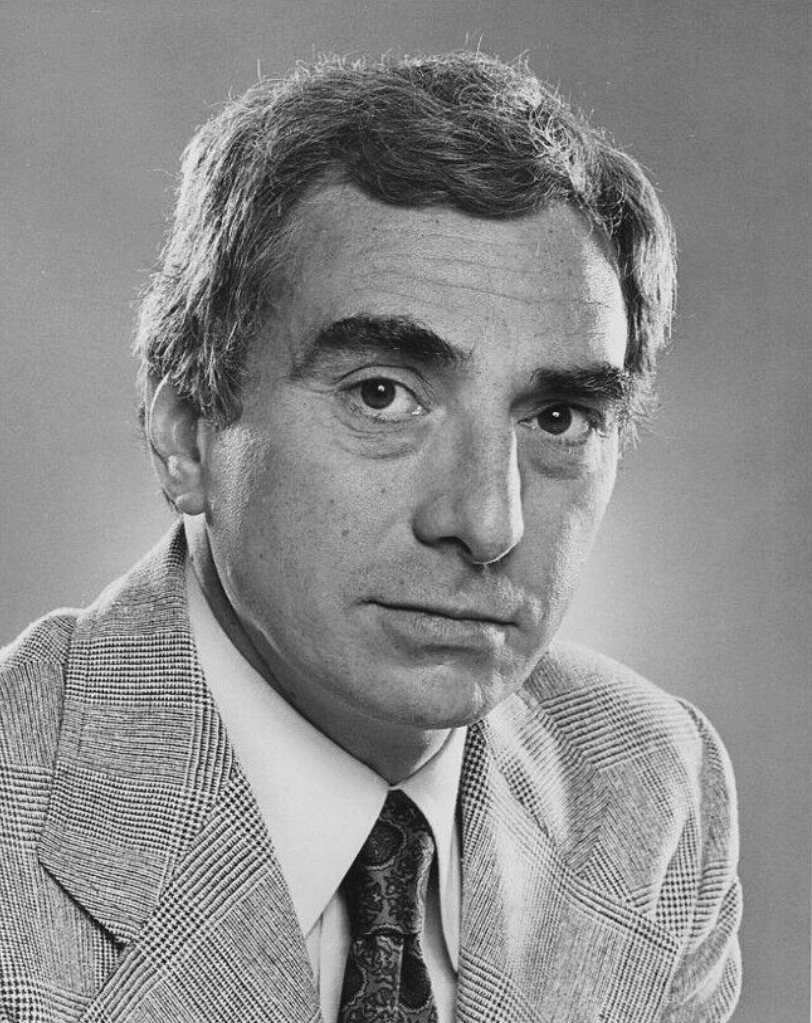
- Dodson in All's Fair, 1976
- Born: John Smeaton Dodson; May 16, 1931; Pittsburgh, Pennsylvania, U.S.
- Died: September 16, 1994 (aged 63); Los Angeles, California, U.S.
- Occupation: Actor
- Years active: 1960–1994
- Spouse: Mary Dodson (m. 1959)
- Children: 2

John Smeaton "Jack" Dodson (May 16, 1931 – September 16, 1994) was an American television actor best remembered for the milquetoast character Howard Sprague on The Andy Griffith Show and its spin-off Mayberry R.F.D. From 1959 until his death in 1994, Dodson was married to television art director Mary Dodson.

== Career ==
In 1966, Andy Griffith hired Dodson for the Howard Sprague role, having previously seen him in Broadway's Hughie. Dodson initially portrayed insurance agent Ed Jenkins in the "Lost and Found" episode of The Andy Griffith Show. Dodson also appeared in episodes of My Friend Flicka, Hazel, The Virginian, Maude, Barney Miller (four episodes), Welcome Back Kotter, Archie Bunker's Place, Newhart, Mr. Belvedere, Matlock, Mama's Family, and St. Elsewhere, on which he had a recurring role.

Dodson appeared as an airplane passenger caught up in a murder plot in a 1973 episode of Hawaii Five-0. In 1967, Dodson appeared in the episode "A Mighty Hunter Before the Lord" of NBC's The Road West, which aired opposite The Andy Griffith Show. He played Norman Gresham in the 1969 film Angel in My Pocket, and also appeared in two Sam Peckinpah films, The Getaway (1972) and Pat Garrett and Billy the Kid (1973). He also had a small role in the 1974 film Thunderbolt and Lightfoot, which starred Clint Eastwood and Jeff Bridges. His other film appearances included roles in Something Wicked This Way Comes (1983) and A Climate for Killing (1991).

In the late 1970s, he had a recurring role as Mickey Malph, Ralph Malph's optometrist father on Happy Days.

In 1975 he was in the Barney Miller episode "Horse Thief". In 1979–80, season 6, he appeared in the episode "Guns". He appeared again on Barney Miller in the two-part episode "Homicide" in season 7.

Dodson appeared in all 24 episodes of the CBS romantic sitcom All's Fair during the 1976-77 season. Set in Washington, D.C., Dodson played Wayne Joplin, a slightly bumbling Democratic senator from an unspecified rural state. The show lasted just one season.

In January 1979, Dodson played Bernie, a hard of hearing acquaintance of Mark (David Spielberg), in a comic scene set in a restaurant in One Day at a Time.

In 1983, Dodson returned to Broadway in the revival of You Can't Take It with You. The actor reprised the role of Howard Sprague in the 1986 NBC-TV movie Return to Mayberry, as well as in a 1990 episode of It's Garry Shandling's Show, "The Day Howard Moved In".

In 1986, Dodson appeared as Gus, a bus depot attendant, in the "Steal One Pearl Two" episode of Mama's Family.

== Personal life and death ==
He died in Los Angeles, California, from heart failure, aged 63, on September 16, 1994.

Dodson's widow, art director Mary Dodson, younger sister of actor Fritz Weaver, died on February 15, 2016.

== Filmography ==
Year	Title	Role	Notes
1963	Car 54, Where Are You?	Workman (uncredited)	1 Episode
1965	Hazel	Grouchy "Open House" lingerer (uncredited)	1 Episode
1965	Peyton Place	Al Pearson	1 Episode
1965	The Wackiest Ship in the Army	Commander Judd	1 Episode
1966	Munster, Go Home!	Second Ship Steward	Uncredited
1966	The Fugitive	Lieutenant	1 Episode
1966	The Virginian	Henry Brodie	1 Episode
1966-68	The Andy Griffith Show	Howard Sprague	43 episodes
1967	The Road West	Jack Hanson	1 Episode
1968-71	Mayberry R.F.D.	Howard Sprague	71 episodes
1969	Angel in My Pocket	Norman Gresham	Movie
1971	Room 222	Mr. Casey	1 Episode
1972	Emergency!	George	1 Episode
1972	The Doris Day Show	Henry Thurston	1 Episode
1972	The Getaway	Harold Clinton	Movie
1972	The Jimmy Stewart Show	Holly	1 Episode
1973	Hawaii Five-O	Will Rowan	1 Episode
1973	Pat Garrett & Billy the Kid	Howland	Movie
1974	Thunderbolt and Lightfoot	Vault Manager	Movie
1975	Adams of Eagle Lake	Doc Russell	2 episodes
1975	Barney Miller	Mr. Franklin	1 Episode
1975	The Manhunter	Judge Corman	1 Episode
1976	Maude	Floyd Hathaway	1 Episode
1976	The Nancy Walker Show	Ed Greenburger	1 Episode
1976	The Practice	Dr. Gardner	1 Episode
1976-77	All's Fair	Senator Wayne Joplin	24 episodes
1976-80	Happy Days	Dr. Mickey Malph	3 episodes
1977	CPO Sharkey	Dr. Savage	1 Episode
1977	Maude	Rev. Harper	1 Episode
1977	Walkin' Walter	Wendell Henderson	
1977	Welcome Back, Kotter	Mr. Hansen	1 Episode
1978	A.E.S. Hudson Street	Coody	1 Episode
1978	Carter Country	Ludlow	1 Episode
1978	In the Beginning	Msgr. Francis X. Barlow	9 episodes
1978	Police Story	Osburn Parker	1 Episode
1978	Snavely	Mr. Bishop	TV movie
1979	13 Queens Boulevard	Mr. Sloan	1 Episode
1979-80	Sesame Street	Man in Letter U Cartoon	Voice
1979-83	One Day at a Time	Mr. Reed / Bernie	2 episodes
1980	Archie Bunker's Place	Tom	1 Episode
1980	Barney Miller	Henry St. Martin / Mr. Vogel	3 episodes
1980	Benson	Major	1 Episode
1980	Lou Grant	Walter Parrott	1 Episode
1980	Mork & Mindy	Ricky	1 Episode
1980	Phyl & Mikhy	Edgar 'Truck' Morley	11 episodes
1981	Broadway on Showtime	Charlie Hughes	1 Episode
1981	Quincy M.E.	Mr. Barswell	1 Episode
1982	Benson	Mac McFadden	1 Episode
1982	Million Dollar Infield	Chuck	TV movie
1982	Newhart	Mr. Shaver	1 Episode
1983	Something Wicked This Way Comes	Dr. Douglas	Movie
1984	American Playhouse	F. Edward Hebert / Charlie Hughes	2 episodes
1984	Gimme a Break!	Principal Smythe	1 Episode
1984	Great Performances	Paul Sycamore	1 Episode
1984-88	St. Elsewhere	Judge Farnham	12 episodes
1985	Cagney & Lacey	Bill Carstairs	1 Episode
1986	Benson	Senator Chapman	1 Episode
1986	Mama's Family	Gus	1 Episode
1986	Return to Mayberry	Howard Sprague	TV movie
1986-89	Mr. Belvedere	Carl Putnam	4 episodes
1987	L.A. Law	Bradford Fredericks	
1987	Night Court		Uncredited
1987	The New Leave It to Beaver	Dr. Harold Warren	
1988	Duet	Walter Johnson	1 Episode
1989	Just the Ten of Us	Burt	2 episodes
1989	Matlock	William Austin	1 Episode
1990	Growing Pains	Judge Herman	1 Episode
1990	It's Garry Shandling's Show	Howard Sprague	1 Episode
1991	A Climate for Killing	Sam Moorehouse	
1992-93	Homefront	Mr. Melon	12 episodes
