= Robert J. Mrazek =

American politician

Bob Mrazek
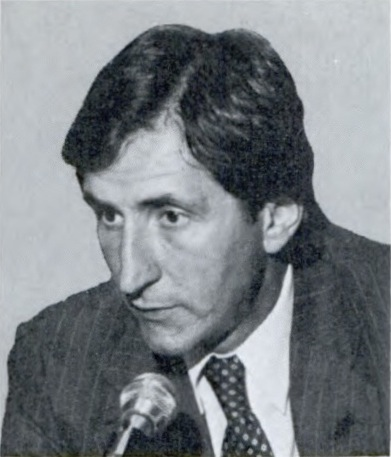
- Mrazek, c. 1990

Member of the U.S. House of Representatives from New York's 3rd district
- In office January 3, 1983 – January 3, 1993
- Preceded by: Gregory W. Carman
- Succeeded by: Peter King

Personal details
- Born: Robert Jan Mrazek; November 6, 1945 (age 80) Newport, Rhode Island, U.S.
- Party: Democratic
- Spouses: Catherine Gurick (m. 1971; died 2004); Carolyn Allen (m. 2005)
- Children: 2
- Education: Cornell University (BA)

Robert Jan Mrazek (born November 6, 1945) is an American author, filmmaker, and former politician. He served as a Democratic member of the United States House of Representatives, representing New York's 3rd congressional district on Long Island for most of the 1980s. Since leaving Congress, Mrazek has authored fourteen books, earning the W. Y. Boyd Literary Award for Excellence in Military Fiction from the American Library Association, the Michael Shaara award for Civil War fiction, and Best Book (American History) from the Washington Post. He also wrote and co-directed the 2016 feature film The Congressman, which received the Breakout Achievement Award at the AARP's Film Awards in 2017.

== Biography ==
Mrazek was born in Newport to Harold Richard Mrazek (1919–2008) and Blanche Rose (née Slezak, 1915–2007), both of Czech descent. Blanche's maternal grandmother Anna Svašková (1862–1946) was born in Strážovice. Robert grew up in Huntington, New York. He graduated from Cornell University in 1967 with a major in political science, then attended the London Film School in 1968.

He joined the United States Navy in 1967 to serve in the Vietnam War, but was disabled by a training injury at Officer Candidate School in Newport. After a period of hospitalization with wounded Marines, he turned against the war. After his 1968 discharge, he was an aide to U.S. Senator Vance Hartke (1969–1971).

In 1993, he became the founding chairman of the Alaska Wilderness League, an organization dedicated to protecting Alaska's wild lands. He still serves as Honorary Chair with former President Jimmy Carter.

In the mid-1990s he was one of the co-founders of the United Baseball League (UBL) which was a planned third major league.

In July 2024, he co-founded Compass Rose Publishing, a small independent book publishing house that is committed to reinvigorating the traditional relationship between book publishers and independent booksellers. He currently serves as Publisher and chair.

== Politics ==
=== Elected service ===
He was elected to the Suffolk County Legislature, 1975–1982 and became its minority leader. He was a delegate to the Democratic National Convention in 1980, 1988, and 1992.

Democrat Mrazek was first elected in 1982 to the 98th United States Congress, defeating John LeBoutillier, a one-term Conservative Republican Congressman in the 3rd district. (The districts had been redrawn to reflect the 1980 U.S. Census.)

Mrazek served in the United States House of Representatives from 1983 until he retired in 1993. Freshman members usually do not sit on the House Appropriations Committee, but Mrazek persuaded Speaker of the House of Representatives Tip O'Neill to make an exception for him. After being elected to his fifth term in Congress, Mrazek announced that he would not stand for re-election, choosing instead to explore a run for the United States Senate in 1992. He abandoned this race after being implicated in the House banking scandal.

=== Legislation ===
Mrazek wrote laws to preserve 3,000,000 acres (12,000 km^{2}) of old-growth forest in Alaska's Tongass National Forest and to protect the Manassas Civil War battlefield in Virginia. In international affairs, he wrote a law to hamper the U.S. Government's ability to intervene in Nicaragua; he also wrote the Amerasian Homecoming Act, which brought the children of American military personnel from Vietnam home to the USA. His National Film Preservation Act established the National Film Registry in the Library of Congress.

Edwards Substitute Amendment to Title II, HR 5052 regarding Nicaragua was passed in June 1986; it limited the Reagan Administration's use of $100,000,000 Congress had approved for military assistance to Contras seeking to overthrow the Sandinista National Liberation Front. Four amendments were proposed to put restrictions on the aid; in offering his, Mrazek raised concern that a Gulf of Tonkin type of incident could be exploited by the Reagan Administration to widen the course of the war, since the Contra camps were located along the border between Honduras and Nicaragua, and firefights between the Contras and the Sandanistas erupted regularly along the border. Mrazek argued that if American troops were killed in one of the camps, the Reagan Administration might send American forces into Nicaragua itself. Eventual declassification of secret White House memoranda revealed Mrazek's concerns were justified. Of the four amendments being considered in the House of Representatives to put restrictions on the aid, the only one to win passage was the Mrazek amendment, which banned all U.S. personnel involved in training Contras from coming within 20 miles (32 km) of the Nicaraguan border.

Amerasian Homecoming Act became law in December 1987. In the wake of its passage, approximately 25,000 children fathered by American servicemen during the Vietnam War were brought to the United States. Called bui doi ("children of the dust") by the Vietnamese because their faces and skin color were painful reminders of the war, they faced terrible discrimination in their homeland; often they were even prevented from going to school. By the mid-1980s, thousands were living in the streets. The United States at first refused to take responsibility for them, but in 1987, at the behest of high school students in his Congressional District who wrote a diplomatically worded letter to the Vietnamese mission in NYC, Mrazek went to Vietnam and brought out an American-Vietnamese child named Le Van Minh, who was a beggar in Ho Chi Minh City (Saigon). While in Vietnam, he met dozens of other Amerasian children, many of whom begged to "go to the land of my father." As a result, Mrazek authored the bill, which became law. Since its passage, many of the Amerasians brought to the United States by the bill have found success after graduation from college, as teachers, entrepreneurs, and business people.

Manassas Battlefield Protection Act: With Representative Michael Andrews (D-TX), Mrazek led the fight in the House of Representatives to prevent the Civil War battlefield at Manassas, Virginia, from being turned into a shopping mall. In April, 1988, he inserted an amendment into an appropriations bill that prohibited federal funds from being used to plan and design a needed interchange near the 542-acre (2.19 km^{2}) tract of land. He and Andrews then introduced H.R. 4526, which authorized the federal government to acquire the land and add it to the battlefield park. In the contentious battle over the legislation, Donald Hodel, President Ronald Reagan's Secretary of the Interior, launched personal attacks on Mrazek and Andrews, accusing them of "playing politics" with the battlefield. Nevertheless, the bill drafted by Mrazek was signed into law by President Ronald Reagan in November, 1988.

National Film Preservation Act: In 1988, as classic films like High Noon and Casblanca were being colorized and other early films were being "time-compressed" by television broadcasters to allow the insertion of more commercials, Mrazek introduced a proposal to protect classic American films from significant alteration without the permission of the films' creators. While the proposal was being considered, the "Mrazek Amendment" generated an intense lobbying campaign against its passage, led on behalf of the major film studios by Jack Valenti, President of the Motion Picture Association of America. At one point, Valenti said the proposal "...puts a spike in the eye of normal House procedure and creates a group which is something out of 1984." The legislation was backed by many members of Hollywood's creative community, including actors Burt Lancaster and James Stewart, directors Steven Spielberg and George Lucas, all of whom wanted to see the integrity of their work preserved without alteration. Ultimately the "moral rights" of the Mrazek amendment prevailed in Congress; its final provisions included the establishment of the National Film Registry, in which 25 films per year deemed "culturally, historically, or aesthetically significant" are protected by the Library of Congress. The law also set up the National Film Preservation Board to explore new approaches to saving endangered work. It was signed into law by President Ronald Reagan on September 27, 1988.

The Tongass Timber Reform Act, which affected logging operations in the nation's largest national forest, was signed into law by President George H. W. Bush in 1990. First introduced by Mrazek in 1986, the proposed law was the subject of several years of contentious debate between its author and members of the Alaska Congressional delegation, including Representative Don Young (R-AK). After being defeated in a House vote on a Mrazek amendment in 1990, Young allegedly "went berserk," tracked Mrazek down in a House corridor and threatened him with a knife. Mrazek's landmark conservation law revoked the artificially high timber cutting targets, protecting over 2,000,000 acres (8,100 km^{2}) of Tongass's old-growth forest and watershed acreage, and mandated broad buffers for all salmon and resident fishing streams.

=== Awards ===
For his conservation and preservation work, the Directors Guild of America awarded Mrazek its first Legislative Achievement Award in 1987. In 1988, Mrazek, along with Andrews, was named a Conservationist of the Year by the NPCA, the National Parks Conservation Association, for their efforts to protect Manassas National Battlefield from adjacent land development. The Governor of New York gave Mrazek the Commissioner's Preservationist Award in 1990.

In 2017, Mrazek was named one of the Four Legends of Civil War Battlefield Preservation by the American Battlefield Trust.

== Author ==
Since retiring from Congress, Mrazek has published fourteen books, including nine novels, and five works of non-fiction; he also wrote the screenplay for the 2016 feature film, The Congressman.

- Stonewall's Gold was published by St. Martin's Press in 1999. It won the 1999 Michael Shaara Award for Excellence in Civil War Fiction.
- Unholy Fire, Mrazek's second Civil War novel, was published by St. Martin's Press in 2003.
- The Deadly Embrace was Mrazek's third novel, a World War II murder/mystery published by Viking Press in 2006. In 2007, The Deadly Embrace earned the W.Y. Boyd Literary Award for Excellence in Military Fiction from the American Library Association as the best military fiction of 2006.
- A Dawn Like Thunder: The True Story of Torpedo Squadron Eight, Mrazek's first non-fiction work, was published by Little, Brown & Co., in 2008. A Dawn Like Thunder was named as a "Best Book of 2009 (American History)" by the Washington Post.
- The Art Pottery of Joseph Mrazek: A Collector's Guide, was published by Wingspan Press in 2009, and tells the story of Mrazek's grandfather, the noted painter, inventor, and maker of hand-painted Czech pottery between the two world wars.
- To Kingdom Come: An Epic Saga of Survival in the Air War Over Germany, published by NAL-Penguin in 2011, is an account of the ill-fated bombing mission of the American Air Force "Flying Fortress" team sent to raid Stuttgart in September, 1943. It was chosen as a main selection of the Military and History Book Club.
- Valhalla, a contemporary thriller involving the discovery of an ancient Viking ship and its crew beneath the Greenland Ice Cap, was published by Penguin/Random House in 2014.
- The Bone Hunters, the sequel to Valhalla, also published by Penguin/Random House in 2014, tells the story of the search for the legendary fossil, Peking Man, which disappeared during the Japanese occupation of Peking in December, 1941, and has never been found.
- And the Sparrow Fell, published by Cornell University Press in 2017, is a coming-of-age tale set against the backdrop of the Vietnam War.
- Dead Man's Bridge: A Jake Cantrell Mystery, published by Crooked Lane Books on August 8, 2017, is the first installment of the Jake Cantrell mystery series.
- The Indomitable Florence Finch: The Untold Story of a War Widow Turned Resistance Fighter and Savior of American POWs, published by Hachette Books on July 21, 2020, tells the story of an unsung World War II heroine who saved countless American lives in the Philippines.
- The Dark Circle, published by Crooked Lane Books on August 12, 2022, is the second installment in the highly praised Jake Cantrell mystery series.
- The Harvard Murders, published by Compass Rose Publishing in February 2025, a murder/mystery involving young JFK during his sophomore year at Harvard. (https://compassrosepublishing.com/book/the-harvard-murders/)
- For This is Forever: The Extraordinary Life of William Robinson Evans, Jr., to be published by Compass Rose Publishing in June 2026.

== Filmmaking ==
Mrazek, who attended the London Film School in 1968, wrote and co-directed his first feature film, The Congressman, which premiered in Washington, D.C., in April 2016. The film stars Treat Williams, Elizabeth Marvel, Ryan Merriman, George Hamilton, Jayne Atkinson, Fritz Weaver, and Marshall Bell.

== Publications ==
- Robert J., Mrazek (2015). The Bone Hunters. Signet. ISBN 9780451468734. OCLC 907167280.
- Mrazek, Robert J. (2014). Valhalla: A contemporary thriller involving the discovery of an ancient Viking ship and its crew beneath the Greenland Ice Cap (1st ed.). New York: Penguin Books/Random House. ISBN 978-0-45-146872-7.
- Mrazek, Robert J. (2008). A Dawn Like Thunder: The True Story of Torpedo Squadron Eight (1st ed.). New York: Little, Brown and Company. ISBN 978-0-316-02139-5.
- Mrazek, Robert J. (2006). The Deadly Embrace: A Novel of World War II. New York: Viking Press. ISBN 0-670-03478-9. OCLC 61240657.
- Mrazek, Robert J. (2003). Unholy Fire: A Novel of the Civil War (1st ed.). New York: Thomas Dunne Books. ISBN 0-312-30673-3.
- Mrazek, Robert J. (1999). Stonewall's Gold: A Novel. maps by Martie Holmer (1st ed.). New York: St. Martin's Press. ISBN 0-312-20024-2.

Adapted for audio (six cassettes), read by Jeff Woodman, Recorded Books, 1999.

U.S. House of Representatives
Preceded by Gregory W. Carman	Member of the U.S. House of Representatives from New York's 3rd congressional district 1983–1993	Succeeded by Pete King
U.S. order of precedence (ceremonial)
Preceded by Stan Lundine as Former U.S. Representative	Order of precedence of the United States as Former U.S. Representative	Succeeded by Floyd H. Flake as Former U.S. Representative
