= Mrs. Santa Claus =

- Promotional poster
- Genre: Comedy; Family; Fantasy
- Written by: Mark Saltzman
- Directed by: Terry Hughes
- Starring: Angela Lansbury; Charles Durning; Michael Jeter; Terrence Mann; Lynsey Bartilson; David Norona
- Music by: Jerry Herman
- Country of origin: United States
- Original language: English

Production
- Executive producer: David Shaw
- Producers: J. Boyce Harman Jr. Eric Ellenbogen
- Cinematography: Stephen M. Katz
- Editor: Stan Cole
- Running time: 90 minutes
- Production companies: Hallmark Entertainment; Corymore Productions
- Budget: $11,000,000

Original release
- Network: CBS
- Release: December 8, 1996

Mrs. Santa Claus is a 1996 American made-for-television musical fantasy comedy film directed by Terry Hughes, with a score by Jerry Herman, starring Angela Lansbury in the title role.

First broadcast as a Hallmark Entertainment presentation on CBS on December 8, 1996, the film was billed as the first original musical written for television since Rodgers and Hammerstein's Cinderella in 1957.

== Plot ==
Anna Claus has Santa's workshop running so efficiently in December 1910, the team has completed all the toys and presents a week ahead of schedule ("Seven Days 'Til Christmas"). She attempts to offer her husband Nicholas a new, more efficient, route around the world, but he is preoccupied by the letters to Santa as Christmas approaches. Feeling ready for a change in her life, Anna decides to assert her independence by testing the route herself, flying the sleigh pulled by Santa's reindeer for an impromptu journey ("Mrs. Santa Claus").

A sudden storm forces her to make an emergency landing near the Statue of Liberty. She befriends the stable boy Marcello, who determines Cupid's injury will require a week of rest and recovery. Marcello offers to take "Mrs. North" to the best boarding house in the city; along the way he indicates the marvelous melting pot nature of his neighborhood, and Mrs. North enjoys the sights and sounds of a burgeoning and bustling New York City ("Avenue A").

At the boarding house, host Mrs. Lowenstein worries that her daughter Sadie is attracting police attention for soapboxing in favor of women's suffrage. After Mrs. North earns the trust of young boarder Nora Kilkenny, the child helps her get a job with a toy manufacturer whose proprietor is motivated by greed and reminds his child laborers that their work need only last until Christmas ("A Tavish Toy"). As the new Tavish Toy Company supervisor, Mrs. North dispels any worries that she is too old to be working with the children ("Almost Young"). After her concerns about toy quality are ignored, Mrs. North vows to reform conditions at Tavish.

Santa begins to worry about his wife after Arvo reveals that she's been gone for two days. Meanwhile in New York, Mrs. North helps Sadie gather a crowd to demand votes for women ("Suffragette March"). Marcello and Sadie share a mutual attraction despite their incompatibility ("We Don't Go Together at All"). Outside a vaudeville show, Mrs. North and Nora cement their friendship and vow to help one another ("Whistle"). Back at the North Pole, devoid of his usual cheer, Santa expresses how deeply he misses his lifelong missus ("Dear Mrs. Santa Claus").

At the Tavish factory, Mrs. North has organized a work slowdown, and she is promptly fired. Nora leaves in solidarity ("Whistle" reprise). Clandestinely entering the Tavish factory via the chimney, Mrs. North rallies the children to organize a citywide strike and crusade for labor reforms. At the Christmas ball the next evening, Sadie raises a toast to Mrs. North and all the lives she's touched since her arrival.

After learning the reindeer have recovered, Mrs. Claus realizes she's ready to return to her husband's side ("He Needs Me"). Back at the stables, Tavish has deduced Mrs. North's true identity, and is determined to prevent Santa's Christmas deliveries. Mrs. Claus resolves the conflict with the perfect gift.

On Christmas Eve, Santa invites Anna to ride beside him for the first time, using the new route she devised. Aboard the flying reindeer sleigh, Anna and Santa are thrilled to be reunited, and express their shared devotion ("The Best Christmas of All").

== Cast ==
- Angela Lansbury as Mrs. Anna Claus
- Charles Durning as Santa Claus
- Terrence Mann as Augie Tavish, owner of Tavish Toys
- Michael Jeter as Arvo, Santa's Head Elf
- Debra Wiseman as Sadie Lowenstein, a Jewish immigrant girl who fights for women's rights
- Lynsey Bartilson as Nora Kilkenny, an Irish immigrant in New York
- Rosalind Harris as Mrs. Lowenstein, Sadie's mother, a Jewish immigrant
- Sabrina Bryan as Fritzie
- David Norona as Marcello Damoroco, an Italian immigrant in New York, who is in love with Sadie
- Bryan Murray as Police Officer Doyle, an Irish immigrant in New York

== Production ==
Angela Lansbury and composer Jerry Herman had previous success with the 1966 Broadway musical Mame. The film was directed by Terry Hughes, costumes by Bob Mackie, and choreography by Rob Marshall. Executive producer David Shaw was Lansbury's stepson. Screenwriter Mark Saltzman based some of the script on family stories of the Lower East Side of Manhattan.

Filming was divided across three California studios from August 12 to September 19, 1996:

- Universal Studios, Universal City – exterior scenes of New York City at New York Street backlot set (Stage 22);
- Stewart Stages, Valencia – interior scenes of North Pole workshop and Santa's office;
- Havenhurst Studios, Van Nuys – blue screen filming of the flying reindeer sleigh.

== Soundtrack ==
Mrs. Santa Claus Original Soundtrack Recording

Soundtrack album
- Released: November 26, 1996
- Recorded: August 8–22, 1996
- Studios: O'Henry Sound Studios; Burbank, California
- Length: 40:50
- Label: RCA Victor
- Producers: Don Pippin, Jerry Herman

Recorded in August 1996 at O'Henry Sound Studios in Burbank, California, the original soundtrack album was released by RCA Victor on November 26, 1996 in CD and cassette tape formats.

Track listing

All tracks are written by Jerry Herman.

No.	Title	Performer(s)	Length
1.	"Overture"	Jerry Herman	6:09
2.	"Seven Days 'Til Christmas"	Michael Jeter, Kristi Lynes, Jamie Torcellini and Angela Lansbury	1:07
3.	"Mrs. Santa Claus"	Lansbury	3:01
4.	"Avenue A"	David Norona, Grace Keagy, Linda Kerns and Ensemble	6:33
5.	"Avenue A (Reprise)"	Lansbury	0:44
6.	"A Tavish Toy"	Terrence Mann	1:51
7.	"Almost Young"	Lansbury	2:49
8.	"Almost Young (Reprise)"	Lansbury and The Kids	0:37
9.	"Suffragette March"	Kerns, Keagy, Debra Wiseman, Lansbury and Women	2:11
10.	"We Don't Go Together at All"	Wiseman and Norona	2:58
11.	"Whistle"	Lansbury and Lynsey Bartilson	3:17
12.	"Dear Mrs. Santa Claus"	Charles Durning	1:47
13.	"Whistle (Reprise)"	Bartilson and Lansbury	0:46
14.	"He Needs Me"	Lansbury	3:44
15.	"The Best Christmas of All"	Durning, Lansbury and Company	3:21
Total length:			41:55

== Reception ==
=== Nielsen ratings ===
The film's original broadcast brought in a 14.7/22 rating/share and 22.52 million viewers, easily winning its timeslot, and tying with a special Thursday repeat of Men Behaving Badly on NBC, for #3 out of 110 programs airing that week.

=== Awards and nominations ===
Year	Award Ceremony	Category	Nominee(s)	Result	Ref.
1997	Primetime Emmy Awards	Outstanding Choreography	Rob Marshall	Nominated	
1997	Primetime Emmy Awards	Art Direction - Miniseries or a Special	Mary Dodson	Nominated	
1997	Primetime Emmy Awards	Costume Design - Miniseries or a Special	Bob Mackie	Nominated	
1997	Primetime Emmy Awards	Outstanding Hairstyling - Miniseries or a Special	Dorothy Andre and Lola 'Skip' McNalley	Won	
1997	Primetime Emmy Awards	Outstanding Music and Lyrics - "Mrs. Santa Claus"	Jerry Herman	Nominated	

== Home media ==
Mrs. Santa Claus was released on VHS and Laserdisc on October 21, 1997, and again on VHS September 18, 2001. It was first released on DVD on September 23, 2003, and was out of print until a 2018 reissue by Sonar Entertainment.

== See also ==
- List of Christmas films
- Santa Claus in film
