= Common Law (1996 TV series) =

- Genre: Sitcom
- Created by: Rob LaZebnik
- Written by: Rob LaZebnik
- Starring: Greg Giraldo; Megyn Price; David Pasquesi; Carlos Jacott; Diana-Maria Riva; Gregory Sierra; John Di Maggio; Richard Fancy; Suzy Nakamura
- Theme music composer: Los Lobos
- Composers: Mark Mothersbaugh; Robert Mothersbaugh
- Country of origin: United States
- Original language: English
- No. of seasons: 1
- No. of episodes: 9 (5 unaired)

Production
- Executive producers: Rob LaZebnik; Paul Junger Witt; Tony Thomas; Gary S. Levine
- Producer: Greg Giraldo
- Camera setup: Multi-camera
- Running time: 30 minutes
- Production companies: Boone County Productions; Witt/Thomas Productions; Warner Bros. Television

Original release
- Network: ABC
- Release: September 28 – October 19, 1996

Common Law is an American television sitcom that premiered on ABC on September 28, 1996. The show stars Greg Giraldo as a Latino lawyer at a mostly white law firm. The series was created by Rob LaZebnik and produced by Witt/Thomas Productions in association with Warner Bros. Television.

Due to low ratings, the series was pulled from ABC's schedule after four episodes had aired.

== Synopsis ==
Common Law focuses on John Alvarez (Greg Giraldo), the seemingly-token Latino at a large, WASPy law firm. John has a degree from Harvard Law School but never forgets his working-class Queens roots, nor the idea that law is about protecting the "little guy" from the major corporations that are his firm's key clients. He has started a clandestine affair with fellow attorney Nancy Slaton (Megyn Price), clandestine because the firm forbids lawyers from dating each other to minimize claims of sexual harassment. To the disgust of his barber father, Luis (Gregory Sierra), John wears his hair long and plays guitar; his father views him as a hippie.

Greg Giraldo was, in reality, a graduate of Harvard Law School, nearly top of his class, and became a lawyer for a while before becoming a comedian. After a year as an attorney, Giraldo fell out of love with the profession and launched his comedy career, only referring to his law background very occasionally on the stand-up circuit until he starred in this series.

Supporters of Common Law pointed to the Saturday 9:30/8:30 time slot as a factor in its poor ratings and subsequent cancellation despite having the long-running ABC sitcom Coach as its lead-in. The series garnered much praise from the Latino community, who were happy to see a character and entertainer of Latino descent starring in such an upscale role. Subsequently, they gave ABC much backlash when the show was canceled.

== Cast ==
- Greg Giraldo as lawyer John Alvarez
- Megyn Price as lawyer Nancy Slaton
- David Pasquesi as Henry Beckett
- Carlos Jacott as Peter Gutenhimmel
- Diana-Maria Riva as receptionist Maria Marquez
- Gregory Sierra as John's father Luis Alvarez
- John Di Maggio as John's childhood friend Francis
- Roxane Wilson as Karen

== Episodes ==
No.	Title	Directed by	Written by	Original release date	Prod. code
1	"Pilot"	Robby Benson	Rob LaZebnik	September 28, 1996	001
2	"In the Matter of: John's 15 Minutes"	Will Mackenzie	Phil Baker & Drew Vaupen	October 5, 1996	004
3	"In the Matter of: Acceptance"	Will Mackenzie	Rob LaZebnik	October 12, 1996	003
4	"In the Matter of: Luis in Love"	Will Mackenzie	Roger Garrett	October 19, 1996	005
5	"In the Matter of: Need"	Henry Winkler	Rob LaZebnik	UNAIRED	002
6	"In the Matter of: Attention"	TBD	Julie Nathanson	UNAIRED	006
7	"In the Matter of: John's Hero"	TBD	TBD	UNAIRED	007
8	"In the Matter of: Thanksgiving"	TBD	TBD	UNAIRED	008
9	"In the Matter of: John and Nancy's Secret"	TBD	TBD	UNAIRED	009

== Bibliography ==
- Tim Brooks and Earle Marsh, The Complete Directory to Prime Time Network and Cable TV Shows 1946–Present, Ninth edition (New York: Ballantine Books, 2007) ISBN 978-0-345-49773-4
