= The Congressman =

- Directed by: Jared Martin; Robert Mrazek
- Written by: Robert Mrazek
- Produced by: Johanna Giebelhaus; Fred Roos
- Starring: Treat Williams; Elizabeth Marvel; Ryan Merriman
- Cinematography: Joe Arcidiacono
- Edited by: Johanna Giebelhaus
- Music by: David Carbonara
- Distributed by: Shadow Distribution
- Release dates: April 9, 2016 (Sarasota); April 29, 2016 (United States)
- Running time: 90 minutes
- Country: United States
- Language: English
- Box office: $71,451

The Congressman is a 2016 American political drama film directed by Robert Mrazek and Jared Martin.

== Plot ==
Maine Congressman Charlie Winship has had a bad day. After being caught on video failing to stand and recite the pledge of allegiance, he knocks out another House member, confronts his angry ex-wife, and faces denunciation by the media for attacking one of the most cherished patriotic symbols in America. As his life spirals out of control, Charlie embarks on a journey to a remote island in the Atlantic whose eccentric inhabitants are in the middle of a shooting war over their fishing grounds.

== Cast ==
- Treat Williams ... Charlie Winship
- Elizabeth Marvel ... Rae Blanchard
- Ryan Merriman ... Jared Barnes
- Chris Conroy ... Ben
- George Hamilton ... Laird Devereaux
- Marshall Bell ... Sherm Hawkins
- Fritz Weaver ... Harlan Lantier
