= Mary Dodson =

American artist

- Born: Mary Weaver; November 24, 1932; Pittsburgh, Pennsylvania, U.S.
- Died: February 15, 2016 (aged 83); Woodland Hills, Los Angeles, California, U.S.
- Education: Carnegie Mellon University
- Occupation: Art director
- Notable work: Murder, She Wrote; Mrs. Santa Claus
- Spouse(s): Jack Dodson (1959–1994; his death); 2 children

Mary Dodson (née Weaver; September 24, 1932 – February 15, 2016) was an American art director known for her work in television. Dodson is credited as the art director for 102 of the 264 episodes of the mystery series, Murder, She Wrote, which aired on CBS from 1984 to 1996, as well as four of the series' television movies.

== Early years ==
Dodson, born Mary Weaver, was born in Pittsburgh, Pennsylvania on September 24, 1932. She had two brothers, including actor Fritz Weaver. Dodson received her bachelor's degree in theater from the former Carnegie Tech University, which is now part of Carnegie Mellon University. She moved to New York City after college, where she was hired by The Tonight Show Starring Johnny Carson.

Her credits also included art direction for The Jack Benny Hour, Columbo, Taxi, Battlestar Galactica, Falcon Crest, and Full House.

== Recognition ==
Dodson received four Emmy nominations during her career: three nominations for her work on Murder, She Wrote (Outstanding Art Direction For A Series – 1992, 1995, and 1996) and one nomination (Outstanding Art Direction For A Miniseries Or Movie – 1997) for the 1996 television film, Mrs. Santa Claus, which starred Angela Lansbury.

She is believed to be the first woman to become a member of the Society of Motion Picture and Television Art Directors, now known as the Art Directors Guild (ADG).

== Death ==
Dodson, a resident of Woodland Hills, Los Angeles, died from complications of Parkinson's disease on February 15, 2016, at the age of 83.

Dodson's husband, actor Jack Dodson, who died in 1994, was best known for his role of Howard Sprague on The Andy Griffith Show and the spin-off, Mayberry R.F.D..
