= LateLine =

American sitcom TV series

- Genre: Sitcom
- Created by: Al Franken; John Markus
- Starring: Al Franken; Megyn Price; Miguel Ferrer; Ajay Naidu; Sanaa Lathan; Catherine Lloyd Burns; Robert Foxworth
- Composer: Mat Morse
- Country of origin: United States
- Original language: English
- No. of seasons: 2
- No. of episodes: 19 (7 unaired)

Production
- Executive producers: Al Franken; John Markus
- Running time: 22 minutes
- Production companies: Markus-Franken Productions; Paramount Television

Original release
- Network: NBC Showtime
- Release: March 17, 1998 – March 16, 1999

LateLine is an American sitcom television series that premiered on NBC on March 17, 1998. The series concluded on March 16, 1999, with seven episodes left unaired due to an abrupt cancellation. Three of the unaired episodes were telecast by the Showtime cable network in December 1999.

Created by John Markus and Al Franken (the latter of whom co-starred in the series), LateLine depicted the behind-the-scenes goings-on of a fictitious late-night television news broadcast, patterned in part after the long-running ABC program Nightline. Many plotlines in the series were satirical, dealing with topics like Deep Throat and the Watergate break-in, and the episodes often had cameos by famous politicians.

== Cast ==
- Al Franken as Al Freundlich
- Megyn Price as Gale Ingersoll
- Miguel Ferrer as Vic Kobb
- Ajay Naidu as Raji Bakshi
- Sanaa Lathan as Briana Gilliam
- Catherine Lloyd Burns as Mona
- Robert Foxworth as Pearce McKenzie

== Episode list ==
=== Season 1: 1998 ===
| No. overall | No. in season | Title | Directed by | Written by | Original release date | Prod. code |
|---|---|---|---|---|---|---|
| 1 | 1 | "Pilot" | Andy Ackerman | Al Franken & John Markus | March 17, 1998 | 001 |
| 2 | 2 | "Al Anonymous" | Unknown | Unknown | March 24, 1998 | 002 |
| 3 | 3 | "Gale Gets a Life" | Unknown | Unknown | March 31, 1998 | 004 |
| 4 | 4 | "Buddy Hackett" | Andy Ackerman | Story by : Steve Lookner; Teleplay by : Al Franken & John Markus & Earl Pomerantz | April 7, 1998 | 003 |
| 5 | 5 | "Pearce's New Best Friend" | Ken Levine | Al Franken & John Markus & Earl Pomerantz | April 14, 1998 | 006 |
| 6 | 6 | "Lawyer, Lawyer" | Jay Sandrich | Al Franken & John Markus & Earl Pomerantz | April 21, 1998 | 005 |

=== Season 2: 1999 ===
| No. overall | No. in season | Title | Directed by | Written by | Original release date | Prod. code |
|---|---|---|---|---|---|---|
| 7 | 1 | "Pearce on Conan" | Unknown | Unknown | January 6, 1999 | 010 |
| 8 | 2 | "Protecting the Source" | Unknown | Unknown | January 13, 1999 | 009 |
| 9 | 3 | "The Minister of Television" | Unknown | Unknown | January 14, 1999 | 017 |
| 10 | 4 | "Kids 'N' Guns" | Unknown | Unknown | January 20, 1999 | 013 |
| 11 | 5 | "Svadharma" | Unknown | Unknown | January 27, 1999 | 007 |
| 12 | 6 | "Karp's Night Out" | Unknown | Unknown | March 16, 1999 | 012 |
| 13 | 7 | "The Christian Guy" | TBD | TBD | * | 008 |
| 14 | 8 | "Mona Moves Up" | TBD | TBD | * | 011 |
| 15 | 9 | "Error Apparent" | TBD | TBD | * | 014 |
| 16 | 10 | "Requiem for a Horse" | TBD | TBD | * | 015 |
| 17 | 11 | "The Negotiator" | TBD | TBD | * | 016 |
| 18 | 12 | "Eine Kleine Office Problem" | TBD | TBD | * | 018 |
| 19 | 13 | "The Seventh Plague" | TBD | TBD | * | 019 |

* Not aired on NBC

== Home media ==
On August 17, 2004, Paramount released a DVD set containing all nineteen episodes on three discs.
