= Lynsey Bartilson =

American business executive and former actress (born 1983)

- Born: Lynsey Marie Bartilson; July 1, 1983 (age 43); Edina, Minnesota, U.S.
- Occupations: Actress, business executive
- Years active: 1994–present

Lynsey Marie Bartilson (born July 1, 1983) is an American former actress and business executive. She is best known for playing Lily Finnerty on the Fox/WB sitcom Grounded for Life, and voicing Tuesday X for the Nickelodeon TV series, The X's.

== Life and career ==
Born in Edina, Minnesota, Bartilson began dance classes at age 4, and won a dance competition three years later. The following year, she made her acting debut as the Wicked Witch in her drama class's production of The Wonderful Wizard of Oz. Bartilson's primary education consisted of home schooling by her mother.

In 2002, Bartilson recorded "This Christmas I Will Give My Love to You" and "Rockin' Around the Christmas Tree" for School's Out! Christmas (2002).

Bartilson has been a member of the Church of Scientology since childhood, and is active in a number of Scientology-related organizations, such as Youth for Human Rights International. In October 2004, she was the Mistress of Ceremonies for the first annual "Youth for Human Rights Day International" in Los Angeles.

As of 2025, Bartilson is the chief operating officer and company partner of Studio III Marketing.

== Filmography ==
=== Film ===
Year	Title	Role	Notes
1997	A Rat's Tale	Isabelle Noble-Rat (voice)	
1998	When I Was a Boy	Jac Benson	Short film
2008	Struck	Office Worker	Short film
2008	Shattered!	Grace	
2013	Joan's Day Out	Red Velvet	Short film
2015	Bad Roomies	Claire	
2017	This Is Christmas		
2021	Luv U Cuz	Alien Receptionist (voice)	Short film

=== Television ===
Year	Title	Role	Notes
1994	The Good Life	'Barney' singer (voice)	Episode: "Paul Dates a Buddhist"
1995	The Kidsongs Television Show	Herself/host	Season 3
1995	Married... with Children	Megan	Episode: "The Undergraduate"
1996	The Faculty	Sarah	Episode: "Bus Stop"
1996	Mrs. Santa Claus	Nora Kilkenny	TV film
1997	Moloney	Erin Heeney	Episodes: "Herniated Nick", "Misconduct", "Past Forgiveness"
1997	7th Heaven	Terri	Episode: "Girls Just Want to Have Fun"
1998	Suddenly Susan	Dina	Episode: "Sleeping with the Enemy"
1998	Party of Five	Parker Brookes	Guest role (season 5)
1999	Zoe, Duncan, Jack and Jane	Gloria Mandelbaum	Episode: "Pilot"
1999	The Amanda Show		Episode: "1.4"
1999	Chicken Soup for the Soul		Episode: "The Christmas Star"
1999, 2001	That '70s Show	Tammy Sue, Lynsey	Episodes: "Garage Sale", "Hyde Gets the Girl"
2000	Any Day Now		Episode: "Hey, Ugly!"
2000	Early Edition	Nikki Kurasek	Episode: "Gifted"
2001	The Nightmare Room	Cindy Harris	Episode: "Four Eyes"
2001–2005	Grounded for Life	Lily Finnerty	Main role
2002	Philly	Cynthia Beck	Episode: "San Diego Padre"
2002	Judging Amy	Samantha Lightstone	Episode: "Thursday's Child"
2002	Fillmore!	Malika (voice)	Episode: "Red Robins Don't Fly"
2003	Strong Medicine	Rina Dobler	Episode: "Emergency Contact"
2005	NYPD Blue	Quinnie Stein	Episode: "La Bomba"
2005–2006	The X's	Tuesday X (voice)	Main role
2006	Malcolm in the Middle	Danielle	Episode: "Bomb Shelter"
2007	NCIS	Ruby Rae	Episode: "Suspicion"
2007	Bones	Sandy Evans	Episode: "Mummy in the Maze"
2010–2011	Psycho Girlfriend	Laura	Episodes: "Love at First Drink", "Moving On", "Too Good to Be True"
2010–2020	The Online Gamer	Becka	TV series
2011	Good Luck Charlie	Christine	Episode: "Story Time"
2011–12	Extra Butter, Please	Various	TV series
2012	Park It Up	Officer Jenkins	TV series
2013	The CLAN	Becka	TV series
