= Fritz Weaver =

American actor (1926–2016)

- Weaver in 1974
- Born: January 19, 1926; Pittsburgh, Pennsylvania, U.S.
- Died: November 26, 2016 (aged 90); New York City, U.S.
- Occupation: Actor
- Years active: 1956–2016
- Spouse: Sylvia Short (m. 1953; div. 1979) Rochelle Oliver (m. 1997)
- Children: 2
- Relatives: Mary Dodson (sister); Jack Dodson (brother-in-law)

Fritz William Weaver (January 19, 1926 − November 26, 2016) was an American stage, film, and television actor. He won the Tony Award for Best Actor in a Play for the original Broadway production of Child's Play (1970), and was nominated for Tony Award for Best Featured Actor in a Play for The Chalk Garden (1958).

On screen, he made his film debut in Sidney Lumet's Fail Safe (1964), and appeared in Marathon Man (1976), Black Sunday (1977), Demon Seed (also 1977), Creepshow (1982), and The Thomas Crown Affair (1999). He was nominated for a Primetime Emmy Award for Outstanding Lead Actor in a Limited Series or Movie for his role in the television miniseries Holocaust (1978).

Weaver was a fixture as a featured and guest actor on science fiction and fantasy shows, including The Twilight Zone, 'Way Out, Night Gallery, The Martian Chronicles, Star Trek: Deep Space Nine, and The X-Files. He was also well known as a Shakespearean, and for his portrayal of Sherlock Holmes in the stage musical Baker Street.

== Early life ==
Weaver was born in Pittsburgh, Pennsylvania, on January 19, 1926, the son of Elsa W. Weaver (née Stringaro) and John Carson Weaver. His mother was of Italian descent and his father was a social worker from Pittsburgh with deep American roots.

Weaver attended the Fanny Edel Falk Laboratory School at the University of Pittsburgh as a child, followed by Peabody High School. He served in the Civilian Public Service as a conscientious objector during World War II.

== Career ==
Following the war, Weaver worked at various jobs before turning to acting in the early 1950s. His first acting role for television came in 1956 for an episode of The United States Steel Hour. Weaver continued to act in television during the next four decades. In 1969, he appeared as Hebron Grant, a Mormon married to two women, on The Big Valley in the episode "A Passage of Saints." He also appeared in several episodes of "Mission Impossible".

Weaver also appeared in the made-for-TV movies Holocaust (1978) and The Legend of Lizzie Borden (1975) in which he played Andrew Borden. He earned an Emmy nomination for the former; the award went to his co-star Michael Moriarty.

Weaver won the Tony Award for Best Actor in a Play and the Drama Desk Award for Outstanding Performance for the Broadway play Child's Play (1970). His other Broadway credits included The Chalk Garden (Tony nomination and Theatre World Award win), All American, Baker Street, Absurd Person Singular, “The Price,” Love Letters, and The Crucible. He appeared in the off-Broadway play Burnt Piano for the HB Playwrights Theatre, and with Uta Hagen in a television adaptation of Norman Corwin's play The World of Carl Sandburg.

Weaver also acted in motion pictures, generally as a supporting player. He appeared in such movies as Fail-Safe (1964; as a jingoist and increasingly unstable U.S. Air Force colonel, ashamed of his foreign-born and alcoholic parents, whom he refers to as "those people"), Marathon Man (1976; as a professor advising the protagonist, a graduate student), Black Sunday (1977; as the lead FBI agent in an anti-terrorism effort), Creepshow (1982; as a scientist who discovers a monster in a crate), and John McTiernan's remake of The Thomas Crown Affair (1999). He also had roles in The Day of the Dolphin (1973), Demon Seed (1977), The Big Fix (1978), and Sidney Lumet's Power (1986). Beginning in 1995, Weaver worked primarily as a voice actor, providing narration for programs on the History Channel. After making his third guest appearance on Law & Order in 2005, Weaver made a "secret decision to retire."

In 2010, Weaver was inducted into the American Theater Hall of Fame. Shortly thereafter, he came out of retirement to make an uncredited cameo in This Must Be the Place (2011), voicing the deceased father of Sean Penn's protagonist. He went on to give prominent supporting performances in the Emmy-nominated television film Muhammad Ali's Greatest Fight (2013) and the theatrically released We'll Never Have Paris (2014), The Cobbler (2014), and The Congressman (2016).

== Personal life and death ==
His brother was the illustrator Robert Weaver, and his younger sister was art director Mary Dodson. Via his sister, he was the brother-in-law to actor Jack Dodson.

Weaver was married twice. His first marriage, to actress Sylvia Short, lasted from 1953 to 1979, and ended in divorce. His second marriage, to actress Rochelle Oliver, lasted from 1997 until his death in 2016. He had two children from his first marriage.

Fritz Weaver died at his home in New York City on November 26, 2016, at age 90.

== Select filmography ==
=== Film ===
- To Trap a Spy (1964) – Andrew Vulcan (archive footage)
- Fail Safe (1964) – Colonel Cascio
- The Borgia Stick (1967) – Anderson
- The Maltese Bippy (1969) – Mischa Ravenswood
- A Walk in the Spring Rain (1970) – Roger Meredith
- The Day of the Dolphin (1973) – Harold DeMilo
- The Legend of Lizzie Borden (1975) – Andrew Borden
- Marathon Man (1976) – Professor Biesenthal
- Black Sunday (1977) – Corley
- Demon Seed (1977) – Alex Harris
- Captains Courageous (1977) – Harvey Cheyne Sr.
- The Big Fix (1978) – Oscar Procari Sr.
- The Martian Chronicles (1980) – Father Peregrine
- Nightkill (1980) – Herbert Childs
- Jaws of Satan (1981) – Father Tom Farrow
- Creepshow (1982) – Dexter Stanley (segment "The Crate")
- Power (1986) – Wallace Furman
- The Thomas Crown Affair (1999) – John Reynolds
- This Must Be the Place (2011) – Cheyenne's Father (voice)
- Muhammad Ali's Greatest Fight (2013) – Hugo Black
- We'll Never Have Paris (2014) – Phillipe
- The Cobbler (2014) – Mr. Solomon
- The Congressman (2016) – Harlan Lantier (final film role)

=== Television ===
- Beyond This Place (1957) – Charlie Castle
- Way Out (1961, Episode: "William and Mary") – Dr. Landy
- The Twilight Zone (1961, Episodes: "Third from the Sun" / "The Obsolete Man") – William Sturka / Chancellor
- The Asphalt Jungle (1961) – Victor Vanda
- The Defenders - (1963, Season 2 Episode 22 "The Traitor") - Vincent Kayle
- Dr. Kildare (1963) – Arthur Hobler
- The Man from U.N.C.L.E. (1964) – Andrew Vulcan
- 12 O'Clock High (1964) – Col. Peter Raff
- Rawhide (1964) – Jonathan Damon
- The Fugitive (1966, Season 3 Episode 28 "A Taste of Tomorrow") – Joe Tucker
- Combat! (1966) – Major Chaplain Ernest Miller
- Gunsmoke (1967) – Marshal Burl Masters
- The Invaders (1967, Episode 30 "The Captive") – Deputy Ambassador Peter Borke
- The Big Valley (1967–1969) – Hebron Grant / Burke Jordan
- Cannon (1971) – "The Nowhere Man" - Leo Kern
- Night Gallery (1971) – Dr. Mazi (segment "A Question of Fear")
- Mission: Impossible (1966–1971) – George Berlinger / Emil Skarbeck / Erik Hagar / Imre Rogosh
- Mannix (1968–1973) – William Avery / Dr. Cameron McKenzie
- Kung Fu – Hillquist
- Movin' On (TV series) (1974) - Eli Hoffner
- Great Performances (1974) – Creon (Antigone)
- The New Land (1974, Episode: "The Word is: Giving" – unaired)
- The Streets Of San Francisco (1975) – Ted Whitlock
- The New Adventures of Wonder Woman (1977) – Dr. Solano
- Holocaust (1978) – Dr. Josef Weiss
- Hawaii Five-O (1979) – Dr. Harvey Danworth
- The Martian Chronicles (1980) – Father Peregrine
- Magnum, P.I. (1980) – Captain J. Cooly, USN
- Don't Eat the Pictures (1983) – Osiris
- Tales of the Unexpected (1984) - Princey
- Tales from the Darkside (Episodes: "Inside the Closet" (1984), "Comet Watch" (1986), – Dr. Fenner / Sir Edmund Halley
- The Twilight Zone (1985, Episode 13; segment "The Star") - Father Matthew Karsighan
- Murder, She Wrote (1985–1987) – Judge Lambert / Edwin Dupont / Paris Inspector Hugues Panassié
- Dream West (1986) – Sen. Thomas Hart Benton
- I'll Take Manhattan (1987) – Mr. Amberville
- Friday the 13th: The Series (1989, in the two-part episode of the third-season opener named "The Prophecies") – Asteroth
- Matlock (1989) – Pastor James Hubert
- All My Children (1992) – Hugo Marick
- Star Trek: Deep Space Nine (1994, S2:E25 "Tribunal") – Kovat
- The X-Files (1996) – Senator Albert Sorenson
- Frasier (1998) – Sir Trevor Ainsley
- Law & Order (1991–2005) – Nathan Fogg / Larry Weber / Philip Woodleigh

== Awards and nominations ==
Award	Year	Category	Work	Result
Clarence Derwent Award	1955	Best Supporting Male	The White Devil	Won
Drama Desk Award	1970	Outstanding Performance	Child's Play	Won
Drama Desk Award	1980	Outstanding Featured Actor in a Play	The Price	Nominated
Drama-Logue Award	1981	Outstanding Performance	A Tale Told	Won
Grammy Award	2001	Best Audio Book, Narration & Storytelling Recording	The Complete Shakespeare Sonnets	Nominated
Jeff Award	2004	Actor in a Principal Role in a Play	Trying	Won
Primetime Emmy Award	1978	Outstanding Lead Actor in a Limited Series or Movie	Holocaust	Nominated
Theatre World Award	1956	—N/a	The Chalk Garden	Won
Tony Award	1956	Best Featured Actor in a Play	The Chalk Garden	Nominated
Tony Award	1970	Best Actor in a Play	Child's Play	Won
