= List of Grounded for Life episodes =

This is a complete list of episodes of the Fox/The WB sitcom Grounded for Life.

== Series overview ==
Season	Episodes		Originally released		
Season	Episodes		First released	Last released	Network
1	15		January 10, 2001	May 23, 2001	Fox
2	22		September 26, 2001	May 8, 2002	Fox
3	13	5	September 17, 2002	December 3, 2002	Fox
3	13	8	February 28, 2003	May 9, 2003	The WB
4	28		September 5, 2003	May 7, 2004	The WB
5	13		September 17, 2004	January 28, 2005	The WB

== Episodes ==
=== Season 1 (2001) ===
No. overall	No. in season	Title	Directed by	Written by	Title reference	Original release date	Prod. code	Viewers (millions)
1	1	"Lily B. Goode"	Gary Halvorson	Bonnie Kallman	"Johnny B. Goode" by Chuck Berry	January 10, 2001	105	12.68
In a desperate grab for attention, Lily makes out with the nerdish next-door neighbor, Brad O'Keefe, in his car; when Sean catches them, he responds in a rather unorthodox way--by throwing fried chicken at the windshield. Meanwhile, Walt babysits Jimmy and Henry and teaches them how to dig a hole; and Eddie tries to hook up the illegal cable so he and Sean can watch softcore porn.
2	2	"In My Room"	Paul Lazarus	Brad Copeland	"In My Room" by The Beach Boys	January 17, 2001	108	11.96
While snooping around in Lily's room, Sean discovers a fake ID; he, Claudia, and Eddie try to find out what she is doing with it.
3	3	"I Wanna Be Suspended"	Ken Kwapis	Bill Martin & Mike Schiff	"I Wanna Be Sedated" by the Ramones	January 24, 2001	102	10.98
Jimmy's science project, a scale model of the Solar System, is due and he is eager to get back from the street fair, but Sean and Claudia drag him along to see The Ramones. Sean writes a note to Jimmy's principal, Sister Helen; during his resulting suspension, Sean and Eddie take him to the Statue of Liberty, which ends in disaster.
4	4	"Devil with a Plaid Skirt"	Craig Zisk	Tyrone Finch & Tom Purcell	"Devil with a Blue Dress" by the Detroit Wheels	January 31, 2001	109	10.89
Lily's skirt length and Jimmy's claim of demonic possession spark a battle between Sean and Sister Helen. Sean brings home an old friend (and Claudia's former boyfriend) who has become a priest.
5	5	"Action Mountain High"	John Whitesell	Bill Martin & Mike Schiff	"Rocky Mountain High" by John Denver	February 7, 2001	101	10.40
Lily's trip to an amusement park with a group of her friends backfires when she calls Sean to pick her up. He does not like what he sees, and when he realizes that he was called because everyone thought he would go easy on them, he proceeds to get them all in trouble by telling their parents.
6	6	"You Can't Always Get What You Want"	Ken Kwapis	Tyrone Finch & Tom Purcell	"You Can't Always Get What You Want" by the Rolling Stones	February 21, 2001	103	7.95
Lily freaks out when Sean says they cannot afford to send her on a ski trip with her classmates. Then she learns that Sean has inherited some money--and spent it on a guitar for himself.
7	7	"Like a Virgin"	Dennie Gordon	Tasha Goldstone	"Like a Virgin" by Madonna	February 28, 2001	111	10.21
Claudia hopes she and Lily will bond during a trip to New Jersey, but when she tells popular cheerleaders from Lily's school that her daughter is still a virgin, Lily takes off, stranding Claudia at the hotel with no daughter, no luggage, and no clothes.
8	8	"Devil's Haircut"	John Blanchard	Bill Martin & Mike Schiff	"Devil's Haircut" by Beck	March 28, 2001	113	8.77
Claudia asks Sean to take Henry to the barber, but it is closed, so he attempts the job himself, causing a catastrophe.
9	9	"Eddie's Dead"	Brian Levant	Chris Kelly	"Ed Is Dead" by the Pixies	April 4, 2001	104	7.94
Sean tries to keep Eddie from hitting on a woman Claudia is consoling after a break-up.
10	10	"Catch Us If You Can"	Ken Kwapis	David M. Israel & Jim O'Doherty	"Catch Us If You Can" by the Dave Clark 5	April 18, 2001	106	8.08
Sean catches a fly ball that is still in play and loses a game for the Yankees. Eddie and the boys are chased home by angry fans, and Claudia is no happier with them because she has been hosting a bachelorette party.
11	11	"Jimmy's Got a Gun"	Paul Lazarus	Ned Goldreyer	"Janie's Got a Gun" by Aerosmith	April 25, 2001	107	7.75
Walt gives Jimmy a BB gun for his birthday and ends up in the hospital, shot in the rump.
12	12	"Jimmy Was Kung-Fu Fighting"	Terry Hughes	Brad Copeland	"Kung Fu Fighting" by Carl Douglas	May 2, 2001	116	7.57
To save for a dream vacation to Mexico, Sean and Claudia start working extra shifts at work. This leads to chaos at home, with Eddie raising the kids, Lily getting her tongue pierced, Jimmy becoming a bully, and Henry panhandling and eating out of the garbage.
13	13	"Loser"	John Blanchard	Tyrone Finch & Tom Purcell	"Loser" by Beck	May 9, 2001	115	6.51
Sean volunteers to referee Henry's soccer team and ends up making an unethical decision in the team's favor, resulting in Henry's ego getting inflated. The next week Sean tries to correct things by making an unethical decision in the opposing team's favor. Meanwhile, Lily flirts with the cute guy at the concession stand, and the conversation leaves her walking on air...until she starts to obsess over it, endlessly replaying the scene in her head, each time thinking that she made a bigger fool of herself.
14	14	"Mrs. Finnerty, You've Got a Lovely Daughter"	Kenny Ortega	Aron Abrams & Gregory Thompson	"Mrs. Brown, You've Got a Lovely Daughter" by Herman's Hermits	May 16, 2001	118	8.73
Sister Helen, the school principal, removes Lily's dance routine from the school talent show, and Sean agrees to sell 30 boxes of chocolate if Sister lets Lily and friends perform their dance; unfortunately, said dance is the sexually-suggestive song "Big Spender" from the Broadway play Sweet Charity.
15	15	"Love Child"	Craig Zisk	Ned Goldreyer & Chris Kelly	"Love Child" by the Supremes	May 23, 2001	112	8.17
While the whole family is attending a wedding, Lily is upset to learn that she was born before her parents were married, so they tell her the story of how she was born. First appearance of Elizabeth Berridge as Eddie's on again/off again girlfriend "Crazy Amy".

=== Season 2 (2001–02) ===
No. overall	No. in season	Title	Directed by	Written by	Title reference	Original release date	Prod. code	Viewers (millions)
16	1	"Baby, You Can't Drive My Car"	Ken Kwapis	Chris Kelly & Ned Goldreyer	"Drive My Car" by the Beatles	September 26, 2001	205	7.69
When the family car disappears one night, Sean is mourning over the loss while Claudia hopes to gain from an inflated insurance claim. But when the car's battered remains are towed to the house a few days later, it turns out that Lily has been covering her tracks about an ill-fated joyride--and the reason her parents have to buy the missing parts from Eddie's mechanic.
17	2	"Dream On"	John Blanchard	Bonnie Kallman	"Dream On" by Aerosmith	October 3, 2001	203	5.89
Claudia's erotic dream about Eddie has Sean trying to reignite their marriage passion. Meanwhile, Henry makes "candy apples" out of anything he can find; and Jimmy serves "turned" apple cider to Lily and her friend Allison (Autumn Reeser).
18	3	"Don't Let Me Download"	Dennie Gordon	Aron Abrams & Gregory Thompson	"Don't Let Me Down" by the Beatles	November 21, 2001	209	8.07
Claudia is shocked to discover porn on Jimmy's computer and insists that she and Sean confront him, but Sean wants to ignore it. Meanwhile, Lily and Jimmy doctor a picture of Sister Helen and use it as an e-mail joke. Then Sister Helen receives the e-mail.
19	4	"Rubber Sold"	Peter Werner	Bob Kushell	Rubber Soul by the Beatles	November 28, 2001	204	8.96
When Sean spots Brad buying condoms at a drugstore, he freaks over Lily attending a bash at Brad's.
20	5	"Bang on a Drum"	John Blanchard	Chris Kelly	"Bang the Drum All Day" by Todd Rundgren	December 5, 2001	206	7.27
Sean and Eddie revive their high-school band to play a wedding reception, but Sean gets nervous when Lily seems interested in their hot new drummer. Jimmy convinces Henry that he cannot find baby pictures of himself because Henry's a robot.
21	6	"Smoke on the Daughter"	John Blanchard	Tyrone Finch & Tom Purcell	"Smoke on the Water" by Deep Purple	December 12, 2001	208	6.80
During a stressful day at work, Claudia takes a puff of a co-worker's cigarette, which quickly turns into an entire cigarette and then a daily habit. Lily catches and busts her, then agrees to keep her secret--for a price. After making a date with Dean on her new cellphone, Lily is humiliated to learn what Dean heard her say when the phone did not turn off.
22	7	"I Saw Daddy Hitting Santa Claus"	John Blanchard	Brad Copeland	"I Saw Mommy Kissing Santa Claus"	December 19, 2001	210	7.66
Playing Santa Claus, Walt promises Henry a $350 AstroJammer Battle Buggy for Christmas; a ticked-off Sean brings violence to Santaland. Meanwhile, Lily tries to figure out whether the blurry gift tag on her boxer shorts reads "from Brad" or "from Dean."
23	8	"Let's Talk About Sex, Henry"	Peter Lauer	David M. Israel & Jim O'Doherty & Bob Kushell	"Let's Talk About Sex" by Salt 'N' Pepa	January 2, 2002	202	9.48
After Henry catches Sean and Claudia having sex, Sean is determined to handle the inevitable topic of the birds and the bees with Henry in a better way than Walt did. After having a father/son talk with Henry about sex, Sean feels good about handling things. Then he and Claudia discover that Henry told his entire class about what he caught Sean and Claudia doing.
24	9	"Is She Really Going Out with Walt?"	Paul Lazarus	Bonnie Kallman & Brad Copeland	"Is She Really Going Out with Him?" by Joe Jackson	January 16, 2002	201	7.65
The Finnerty's plan to push Walt back into the social scene backfires when he is social with a lady they do not like. Meanwhile, Lily fears that her bad behavior has thrust Brad into Kristina's arms.
25	10	"We Are Family"	Dennie Gordon	David M. Israel & Jim O'Doherty	"We Are Family" by Sister Sledge	January 23, 2002	213	9.79
A favor for Claudia's well-connected Uncle Sal (Vincent Pastore) goes awry, leading Sean to fear that the guy may be a goodfella. Meanwhile, a plumbing problem forces Lily to shower at Brad's.
26	11	"Mr. Roboto"	John Blanchard	Tasha Goldstone	"Mr. Roboto" by Styx	January 30, 2002	212	8.79
Sean creates a "first place" robot for Jimmy's science fair, then stands up at the fair and admits that he made his son's robot. Then he requests that the other parents do the same (as it is obvious that the parents made the other robots). In the end, Jimmy and his robot battle classmate Benji and his robot.
27	12	"Don't Fear the Reefer"	Linda Mendoza	Aron Abrams & Gregory Thompson	"Don't Fear the Reaper" by Blue Öyster Cult	February 6, 2002	219	7.09
Sean's swing at tree surgery causes a blackout during the Super Bowl, but his biggest concern was that while chopping the tree, he saw, through Lily's window, Lily holding a bag of pot. But what's even more shocking is where Lily got the weed: out of Sean's closet. Dan O'Keefe moves his Super Bowl party to the Finnerty home, where they listen to a play-by-play given by Jimmy from his 5-inch TV.
28	13	"Take It to the Limit"	Dennie Gordon	Ned Goldreyer	"Take It to the Limit" by the Eagles	February 13, 2002	207	7.33
Lily's compulsive credit-card usage sinks Sean's plans to take Henry and his friends to a pricey water park; Eddie refuses to open up to his family about the contents of his mysterious locked box.
29	14	"Eddie Said Knock You Out"	John Blanchard	Ned Goldreyer	"Mama Said Knock You Out" by LL Cool J	February 20, 2002	216	7.94
Sean accepts Dan O'Keefe's challenge for a boxing match and then discovers Eddie has tried to fix the fight. At the match, Claudia is enraged to learn of a rumor that she has had breast-enhancement surgery.
30	15	"Safety Dance"	Dennie Gordon	Bob Kushell	"The Safety Dance" by Men Without Hats	March 6, 2002	211	8.13
Sean and Claudia chaperone Lily's school dance, but it is Sister Helen who catches Lily and Dean making out--with a bottle of liquor nearby. Lily insists that it is not hers, but everyone is surprised at whose it is. Meanwhile, Eddie takes to using Walt as his goon to shake down shady business associates.
31	16	"Relax!"	John Blanchard	Chris Kelly	"Relax" by Frankie Goes to Hollywood	March 27, 2002	214	6.93
Sean accidentally "outs" a gay co-worker, so he tries to get him to come out officially. Lily's ready to rumble when women keep hitting on Dean.
32	17	"The Kids Are Alright"	John Putch	Andy Glickman	"The Kids Are Alright" by the Who	April 3, 2002	215	6.13
When Sean and Claudia win a free weekend in Atlantic City, they reluctantly leave the kids in Eddie's care. They return to find Jimmy and Henry locked in the basement and apparent remains of a party. But Eddie may not be the perpetrator...
33	18	"Swearin' to God"	John Blanchard	Mike Schiff & Bill Martin	"Swearin' to God" by Frankie Valli	April 10, 2002	218	6.53
Sean exploits a nun's foulmouthed faux-pas to get Claudia and the kids everything they've ever wanted from St. Finnian's.
34	19	"Eddie and This Guy with Diamonds"	John Putch	Jeremy Hall	"Lucy in the Sky with Diamonds" by the Beatles	April 17, 2002	221	6.25
Sean winds up in jail for buying shady diamond earrings for Claudia from Eddie's so-called "connection"; Lily protests the nuns' donkey-basketball game.
35	20	"I Fought the In-Laws"	John Blanchard	Story by : Brad Copeland; Teleplay by : Tyrone Finch & Tom Purcell	"I Fought the Law" by the Bobby Fuller Four	April 24, 2002	222	5.30
Claudia's visiting parents' minor insults get too far under an insecure Sean's skin. Meanwhile, karaoke leads to an unlikely liplock between Brad and Lily.
36	21	"Dust in the Wind"	Dennie Gordon	Orit Schwartz	"Dust in the Wind" by Kansas	May 1, 2002	217	6.20
Sean and Eddie plan to honor their late cousin's wishes by scattering his Tupperware-borne ashes over the old water tower; Lily meets a cute guy at the funeral. Guest appearance: Ashton Kutcher as Cousin Scott.
37	22	"Oops!... I Did It Again"	John Blanchard	Tasha Goldstone	"Oops!… I Did It Again" by Britney Spears	May 8, 2002	220	7.03
Sean finds a home-pregnancy test in the trash and immediately suspects Lily, but... Meanwhile, Lily learns more about her birth circumstances, and Jimmy sings the blues over an aggressive zit on his face. Guest appearance: Joseph Simmons credited as Joseph "Rev.Run" Simmons as RUN.

=== Season 3 (2002–03) ===
No. overall	No. in season	Title	Directed by	Written by	Title reference	Original release date	Prod. code	Viewers (millions)
Fox
38	1	"I Didn't Start the Fire"	John Blanchard	Bill Martin & Mike Schiff	"We Didn't Start the Fire" by Billy Joel	September 17, 2002	301	8.91
Claudia learns the results of her pregnancy test, and Sean celebrates the news with a major purchase: a bar that Eddie plans to burn down for the insurance money. While Lily and Brad get liquored-up, Henry develops a craving for a different kind of watering-hole delicacy.
39	2	"Mustang Lily"	John Blanchard	David M. Israel & Jim O'Doherty	"Mustang Sally" by Wilson Pickett	September 24, 2002	302	7.69
Grandpa Tony gives Lily a car, and Sean loses it in a street race, nearly blowing his shot at snagging a loan from Tony. Meanwhile, Henry and Jimmy put the squeeze on Grandpa Tony for hefty Tooth Fairy funds. Guest appearance: Wilmer Valderrama as Gang member.
40	3	"Oh, What a Knight"	John Putch	Erica Rivinoja	"December, 1963 (Oh, What a Night)" by the Four Seasons	November 19, 2002 (Note: Disputed airing date for "Oh, What a Knight".)	309	N/A
Sean joins the Knights of Hibernia for Lily to compete in their beauty pageant.
41	4	"Part-Time Lover"	John Blanchard	Chris Kelly	"Part-Time Lover" by Stevie Wonder	November 26, 2002 (Note: Disputed airing date for "Part-Time Lover".)	306	N/A
When the dump closes, Walt finds himself with an abundance of free time and begins hanging around the house, much to the dismay of Lily, who finds it increasingly hard to get alone-time with Brad. So she schemes to get him a date online...which turns out to be with a drag-queen. Meanwhile, Eddie finds out that his girlfriend has another boyfriend.
42	5	"Cat Scratch Fever"	John Blanchard	Ned Goldreyer	"Cat Scratch Fever" by Ted Nugent	December 3, 2002	304	8.47
Sean hires his high-school fantasy girl as the bartender, and she and Claudia clash (again). At a concert, Lily tells Dean she loves him and cannot hear his response.
The WB
43	6	"Drive Me Crazy"	John Blanchard	Bill Martin & Mike Schiff	"(You Drive Me) Crazy" by Britney Spears	February 28, 2003	314	3.15
Lily has failed her behind-the-wheel test for the second time, but this time it is because Sean has sabotaged her by teaching her ridiculous driving tips. Meanwhile, in her efforts to keep her sons from playing a violent video game condemned by Sister Helen, Claudia gets addicted to it herself.
44	7	"Just Like a Woman"	John Blanchard	Brad Copeland	"Just Like a Woman" by Bob Dylan	February 28, 2003	315	3.76
The boys mock Sean when he cannot get the lug nuts off the car, and Claudia must attract a trucker's attention to change the flat tire while Sean sits in drag in the backseat. Eddie holds a garage sale at Sean's house, featuring hot merchandise and Sean's possessions, and welcomes the kids to partake. But Lily is mortified when Brad buys her bra and boasts to the school that he and Lily have slept together.
45	8	"Henry's Been Working for the Drug Squad"	John Blanchard	Ned Goldreyer	"Julie's Been Working for the Drug Squad" by the Clash	March 7, 2003	317	4.20
Following his school's drug-awareness day, Henry goes overboard with thinking his family is on drugs. When he finds a suspicious plant growing in the yard, he stages an intervention for his dad.
46	9	"Cuts Like a Knife"	John Blanchard	Chris Kelly	"Cuts Like a Knife" by Bryan Adams	March 14, 2003	303	3.04
Sean has a hard time fighting off an amorous Claudia after lying to her that he is undergone a vasectomy; Brad pays Lily to tutor him in a subject at which he already excels, just to spend time with her.
47	10	"Who Are You?"	John Blanchard	Jeremy Hall	"Who Are You" by the Who	March 28, 2003	318	3.60
Shocked to learn that Jimmy has been shoplifting, Sean and Claudia try to figure out his motivations for stealing. Lily agonizes over what to wear to dinner with Dean's parents. Henry brings home his class's pet lizard.
48	11	"Welcome to the Working Week"	John Putch	Jill Condon & Amy Toomin	"Welcome to the Working Week" by Elvis Costello, "Take This Job and Shove It" by Johnny Paycheck	April 25, 2003	316	3.70
Lily goes on a shopping spree with her "emergency credit card," then has to pay the bill by getting a job--at the bar. Meanwhile, Eddie fumes over a scathing review of the bar; Henry takes energy conservation to the extreme.
49	12	"Claudia in Disguise with Glasses"	John Blanchard	Aron Abrams & Gregory Thompson	"Judy in Disguise (with Glasses)" by John Fred	May 2, 2003	319	2.97
Claudia wreaks havoc at a wedding reception after losing her glasses; Lily convinces Eddie to persuade Dean to get her the perfect birthday gift; Brad begins spending way too much time with Jimmy.
50	13	"Tonight's the Night"	John Blanchard	Aron Abrams & Gregory Thompson	"Tonight's the Night (Gonna Be Alright)" by Rod Stewart	May 9, 2003	305	3.52
It is Lily's 16th birthday, and she's ready to have sex with Dean. During the party held at the bar, Claudia, Sean, Henry, and Jimmy have to leave. When they return home, Claudia catches Lily outside her room after losing her virginity to an unexpected partner.

=== Season 4 (2003–04) ===
No. overall	No. in season	Title	Directed by	Written by	Title reference	Original release date	Prod. code	Viewers (millions)
51	1	"Your Father Should Know: Parts 1 & 2"	John Blanchard	Jill Condon & Amy Toomin	"Your Mother Should Know" by the Beatles	September 5, 2003	310/402	3.82
52	2	"Your Father Should Know: Parts 1 & 2"	John Blanchard	Chris Kelly	"Your Mother Should Know" by the Beatles	September 5, 2003	310/402	3.82
Brad's father is boasting that Lily and Brad slept together; after confronting him about it, Sean confronts Claudia--and learns that she already knew, too. So when Brad gets injured by an airborne Christmas decoration, everyone thinks Sean lost his temper. Disgusted that the boys have spent his and Sean's Liberty-quarter collection, Eddie takes them out to teach them a lesson about stealing--by stealing a toy machine that Henry had loaded with quarters. Claudia feels it's time to smooth relations between the two families by having the O'Keefes over for dinner. Still, the evening falls apart when Brad's mother blames Lily for taking Brad's innocence. Eddie teaches Jimmy and Henry a lesson in respecting other people's property when he finds out they deposited his coin collection in arcade games.
53	3	"All the Young Nudes"	John Blanchard	Brad Copeland	"All the Young Dudes" by Mott the Hoople	September 12, 2003	307	3.52
Sean and Eddie hire strippers for the bar to help make ends meet--then wind up being protested by the PTA. But what's most shocking is who set the PTA on their tails. Meanwhile, Brad asks Lily to break up with Dean. She reluctantly agrees--then he takes it far easier than she expected.
54	4	"I Right the Wrongs"	John Blanchard	David Goetsch & Jason Venokur	"I Write the Songs" by Barry Manilow	September 19, 2003	308	3.30
Brad is bothered that Lily is embarrassed to be seen with him, so Sean tries to make over his geeky image. Sean succeeds only in getting another student suspended from school, which leads to an in-bar confrontation with Sister Helen. Jimmy's "trademark" hair-length has become an issue at school. Claudia helps Eddie deal with an unwise purchase he made for the bar--by getting drunk with the customers, and Lily confesses her relationship with Brad in front of the entire school.
55	5	"I Just Paid to Say I Love You"	John Blanchard	Jeff Astrof & Mike Sikowitz	"I Just Called to Say I Love You" by Stevie Wonder	September 26, 2003	401	3.26
Brad plans a romantic date with Lily in New York City, but because one incident throws them off schedule, the rest of the evening becomes a disaster. Eddie breaks a window in the sewing room, leaving it wide open for an animal to wander in...which Henry wants to keep as a pet.
56	6	"S.A.T. and Sympathy (S.A.T. Out of Hell)"	John Blanchard	Aron Abrams	"Tea and Sympathy" by Janis Ian, "Bat Out of Hell" by Meat Loaf	October 3, 2003	311	2.82
Lily and Brad stress over their upcoming SATS, and Claudia turns the SATs into a competition. Sean teaches Henry a lesson in compassion by taking in a homeless guy.
57	7	"Pay You Back with Interest"	John Blanchard	Bill Martin & Mike Schiff	"Pay You Back with Interest" by the Hollies	October 10, 2003	403	2.64
After Eddie buys an electric car to impress a girl, Sean unwisely gives Eddie a loan without telling Claudia, which results in her college enrollment check bouncing. Brad discovers Lily has a tattoo with Dean's name, but Lily's plea for her parents to pay for her tattoo removal goes ignored.
58	8	"Ticket to Ride"	John Blanchard	Jill Condon & Amy Toomin	"Ticket to Ride" by the Beatles	October 31, 2003	404	2.4
After a night of partying, Lily wakes up with a nasty hangover, her car parked on the porch, and no memory of how she got home. Sean and Claudia decide to sell her car and sign a contract that she will call them when she is too drunk to drive. Angry at losing her car, Lily pretends to be drunk night after night so her parents will keep picking her up. Eddie makes a huge profit when he sells Lily's car for Sean.
59	9	"Smells Like Teen Spirit"	John Blanchard	Erica Rivinoja	"Smells Like Teen Spirit" by Nirvana	November 7, 2003	406	3.56
When Jimmy's body odor becomes problematic, Sean and Eddie each intervene. Brad accidentally sees Claudia naked.
60	10	"Baby Come Back"	John Blanchard	Ned Goldreyer	"Baby Come Back" by Player	November 14, 2003	312	2.7
Sean becomes jealous when Claudia is asked to do some modeling for a fashion photographer, so she storms out, leaving him to continue hosting her bath-products party. Meanwhile, Lily hates her yearbook photos.
61	11	"Been Caught Stealing"	John Putch	Erica Rivinoja	"Been Caught Stealing" by Jane's Addiction	November 21, 2003	313	2.60
Sean and Eddie arrive at the bar to discover they've been robbed. Instead of calling the police, Walt insists on cleaning up. Lily and Brad wind up in a fight during a day at the mall, so Lily decides to go out with another guy.
62	12	"(She's Got) Kegs"	Richard Boden	Steve Armogida & Jim Armogida	"Legs" by ZZ Top	January 9, 2004	408	2.75
Sean wants to go to a Sex Pistols concert, but Claudia has to study for a college test, and Lily has a science project due, which leaves no one to watch the boys. Lily leaves Brad holding the bag by skipping off to a frat party--where she runs into Claudia. Eddie hires a bodyguard.
63	13	"My Ex-Boyfriend's Back"	Keith Truesdell	Ned Goldreyer	"My Boyfriend's Back" by the Angels	January 16, 2004	412	2.62
Lily resents her ex-boyfriend's ability to move on so quickly after she dumped him; Eddie's stand-up routine flops until he incorporates material from Claudia and Sean's personal life.
64	14	"Communication Breakdown"	John Blanchard	Bill Martin & Mike Schiff	"Communication Breakdown" by Led Zeppelin	January 23, 2004	411	3.26
Sean forgets to give Claudia an important message from her professor; Jimmy hides the telephone bill to conceal his calls to a 976 number; Lily freaks out when Brad does not call her for three hours.
65	15	"All Apologies"	John Blanchard	Jeff Astrof & Mike Sikowitz	"All Apologies" by Nirvana	January 30, 2004	407	3.15
During a romantic getaway at a hotel, Claudia and Sean watch an adult film and realize it was shot in their home; a girl bullying Jimmy might like him.
66	16	"I Think We're Alone Now"	John Blanchard	Erica Rivinoja	"I Think We're Alone Now" by Tommy James	February 6, 2004	410	2.31
Sean and Claudia try to take advantage of an empty house to get in some alone-time; Lily realizes that Brad is not a good dancer; Jimmy and Henry vent their frustrations on each other by playing paintball.
67	17	"Can't Get Next to You"	John Putch	Chris Kelly	"I Can't Get Next to You" by the Temptations	February 13, 2004	409	3.02
Lily, Brad, and Jimmy sign abstinence pledges at school; Brad asks Lily to marry him; Jimmy throws out everything that reminds him of sex; Walt reveals that Eddie was born left-handed.
68	18	"Racketman"	John Blanchard	Dave Tennant	"Rocket Man" by Elton John	February 20, 2004	413	2.89
Brad's dad claims to have been taking tennis lessons for years. After Sean beats him at tennis, it turns out that "tennis lessons" was the cover he gave while having an affair.
69	19	"Me and Mrs. O"	John Blanchard	Jill Condon & Amy Toomin	"Me & Mrs. Jones" by Billy Paul	February 20, 2004	414	2.89
When the Finnertys throw Brad a birthday party to take his mind off his parents' recent breakup, Sean invites Dan to the party as part of his "plan" to reunite him with Connie. But Connie has taken Claudia's advice to "get some," which prompts her to pursue Eddie.
70	20	"Tombstone Blues"	John Blanchard	Chris Kelly	"Tombstone Blues" by Bob Dylan	February 27, 2004	417	2.91
Claudia tries to set up a perfect family photo, but everything goes wrong. During a trip to the cemetery, Sean discovers that Walt buried his wife's cat in the grave plot reserved for Claudia. Lily wants Brad to be in the family photo, but Claudia says no. Eddie is trying to get a girl pregnant.
71	21	"Pictures of Willy"	John Blanchard	Ned Goldreyer	"Pictures of Lily" by the Who	February 27, 2004	419	2.91
Eddie runs into Crazy Amy while on a date with Hope. He is afraid that Amy is going to ruin his relationship. So Sean helps Eddie steal a safe that contains nude photos of him. Jimmy gets a date with a deaf girl.
72	22	"It's Hard to Be a Saint in the City"	John Blanchard	Jim Armogida & Steve Armogida	"It's Hard to Be a Saint in the City" by Bruce Springsteen	March 5, 2004	416	3.31
Sean is having trouble keeping the bar alive, and Claudia asks him to reconsider running it. With St. Patrick's Day around the corner, Eddie tries to lure customers over from rival pubs. Brad and Lily prepare for the parade, and Jimmy is having trouble understanding the meaning of St. Patrick's Day.
73	23	"Beat on the Brat"	John Putch	Ned Goldreyer	"Beat on the Brat" by the Ramones	March 19, 2004	405	2.72
Sean disciplines one of Henry's bratty friends; Lily asks Brad to choose between her and his geeky friends; Eddie uses a Jewish online dating service.
74	24	"The Cheat Is On"	Sean Lambert	Erica Rivinoja	"The Heat Is On" by Glenn Frey	March 26, 2004	418	3.14
Claudia copies Lily's school paper, only to find out Lily plagiarized the essay. Sean hints to Sister Helen that Lily may have cheated, but he learns too late that the school's "zero-tolerance" policy on cheating could result in Lily being expelled.
75	25	"You're So Vain"	John Blanchard	Jeff Astrof & Mike Sikowitz	"You're So Vain" by Carly Simon	April 16, 2004	415	2.35
Claudia's father Tony has returned to the Finnertys' for an operation; the family is very sympathetic, except for Sean, who knows what Tony's having done.
76	26	"Pressure Drop"	John Blanchard	Eric Kentoff	"Pressure Drop" by Toots & the Maytals	April 23, 2004	420	2.53
Claudia tries to alleviate Sean's hypertension and high blood pressure by running the household all by herself, but everything goes awry. Jimmy gets suspended from school, and Lily and Brad break her bed, so they steal the family car and get it impounded.
77	27	"Get a Job"	John Blanchard	Jim Armogida & Steve Armogida	"Get a Job" by the Silhouettes	April 30, 2004	421	2.22
Lily is less than thrilled about Brad's new job, which is taking up all of his time. Meanwhile, Walt's having problems finding work, so Sean and Eddie offer him a job at the bar. Jimmy's at the age where he finds his mother to be an embarrassment, so Claudia sets out to bond with him.
78	28	"Space Camp Oddity"	John Blanchard	Chris Kelly	"Space Oddity" by David Bowie	May 7, 2004	422	2.45
Brad tells Lily about his space-camp girlfriend Lana; Lily thinks he is just making her up until she sees him board the bus to space camp with the very real, very cute Lana.

=== Season 5 (2004–05) ===
No. overall	No. in season	Title	Directed by	Written by	Title reference	Original release date	Prod. code	Viewers (millions)
79	1	"The Policy of Truth"	John Blanchard	Chris Kelly	"Policy of Truth" by Depeche Mode	September 17, 2004	501	3.39
Sean intercepts a phone call from Claudia's doctor and discovers she is pregnant. He does not want to tell Claudia yet since it's his fault she is pregnant. After admitting he hooked up with his space-campmate Lana, Brad begs Lily's forgiveness until he learns of her infidelity. Guest appearance: Mila Kunis as Lana.
80	2	"Man, I Feel Like a Woman"	John Blanchard	Jeff Astrof & Mike Sikowitz	"Man! I Feel Like a Woman!" by Shania Twain	September 24, 2004	502	2.67
Sean's feeling sick, and Eddie convinces him that he has sympathetic pregnancy syndrome. Brad and Lily decide to be friends, but their hormones get the best of them. Jimmy tries to impress the new neighbor girl by pretending to be a sports fanatic. Eddie resumes his relationship with his ex, Faye, who's become angrier and more bitter than ever.
81	3	"One Is the Loneliest Number"	John Blanchard	Bill Martin & Mike Schiff	"One" by Three Dog Night	October 1, 2004	503	2.49
Now that Eddie is spending all of his free time with Faye, lonely Sean finds every possible thing wrong with her, including the way she parks her car, which he "accidentally" smashes into. Lily's attempt to make Brad jealous by dating Mocha Joey backfires when Brad points out that Lily and Mocha Joey have nothing in common, and Claudia gets upset when she finds out that Sean has told everyone that she is pregnant.
82	4	"Day Tripper"	John Blanchard	Erica Rivinoja	"Day Tripper" by the Beatles	October 8, 2004	505	2.93
Eddie moves into the Finnerty basement after being evicted from his apartment. Claudia is not happy and tells him if he screws up, he is out. Lily is jealous of Brad's new girlfriend, Taya, when she becomes the school football team's first girl. Claudia's pregnancy interferes with her motherly duties.
83	5	"You Better You Bet"	Sean Lambert	Jim Armogida & Steve Armogida	"You Better You Bet" by The Who	October 15, 2004	506	2.58
Claudia is upset with Sean when she finds out he gambled the money for the baby's crib and used the winnings to buy a new TV. When Claudia accidentally breaks the TV, she convinces Eddie to take her to the track to win money to repair the set. Meanwhile, Jimmy must endure a painfully long day of father-son bonding to keep Sean from finding out about the broken TV, and Lily enrolls in a Big/Little Sister program but is dumped by her Little Sister. Guest appearance: Miranda Cosgrove as Jessica.
84	6	"Psycho Therapy"	John Blanchard	Rebecca Hughes	"Psycho Therapy" by the Ramones	October 22, 2004	507	2.62
Brad and Lily fight it out in a race for student body president, but the sniping and mudslinging is a mask to hide the former lovers' true feelings about each other. Meanwhile, Eddie is depressed and seeks the help of a quack psychiatrist. Claudia tries not to learn the baby's sex, wanting to be surprised.
85	7	"I'm Looking Through You"	Keith Truesdell	Ned Goldreyer	"I'm Looking Through You" by the Beatles	November 5, 2004	504	2.58
Sean's old friend Dave is in town, a children's performer who goes under the name "J.J. Bodybuddy." Sean invites Dave to stay out of the house and promises the school a J.J. Bodybuddy show, but Dave--a decade-sober recovered alcoholic--gets too drunk to do the gig, so Sean must don the Bodybuddy leotard himself. Lily expresses her jealousy of the new baby.
86	8	"Mystery Dance"	John Blanchard	Dave Tennant	"Mystery Dance" by Elvis Costello	November 12, 2004	508	3.34
With the bar in financial trouble, Sean and Claudia must get extra jobs to pay the bills: Sean applies for a manager position at T.J. Shenanigans while Claudia works from home collecting unpaid medical bills. When Sean and Eddie find themselves competing for the same job, they consider selling the bar. Meanwhile, Brad and Lily get back together, and broken-hearted Taya rebounds with Jimmy.
87	9	"Do Ya Think I'm Sexy?"	John Blanchard	Kristin Holloway	"Da Ya Think I'm Sexy?" by Rod Stewart	November 19, 2004	509	3.09
Feeling unsexy and depressed, pregnant Claudia gets a boost when her cute study buddy, Steve, flirts with her -- then she finds out that Sean paid him to do so. Lily helps Eddie write stand-up routine material, but another comic steals their jokes. Brad gets Jimmy into Science-Nauts, but Jimmy is less than enthusiastic about it until he finds out that every meeting's "secret" involves porn.
88	10	"Tom Sawyer"	John Blanchard	Chris Kelly	"Tom Sawyer" by Rush	January 7, 2005	510	2.52
Lily becomes insecure when she learns that she is "not school smart." When Brad snags an interview at Yale, she becomes jealous and connives to land her interview. Sean takes a second job as a limo driver to avoid doing work at home. Claudia tries to convince her neighbor, Arianna, that the Finnerty clan is not trash. Jimmy seeks advice from Eddie for his debut in the school production of Tom Sawyer.
89	11	"The Letters"	John Blanchard	Jeff Astrof & Mike Sikowitz	"The Letter" by Joe Cocker	January 14, 2005	511	2.78
Sean becomes infuriated after receiving letters from the Home Owner's Association telling him to clean up his house, while Claudia is happy about the neighborhood's positive changes. Lily insists that Brad buys her an anniversary gift from a list that she is made. Still, he defies her wishes and gets her a sexy nightie that he cannot enjoy because he is busy picturing Sister Helen, who he ran into at the lingerie store. Jimmy announces that he has become a vegetarian.
90	12	"Crazy"	John Blanchard	Ned Goldreyer	"Crazy" by Patsy Cline	January 21, 2005	512	2.96
Eddie's ex, Amy, displays naked photos of him in an art gallery, but he is too afraid to ask her to remove them; Sean is having problems trying to sell the Red Boot; Claudia has a baby shower, and Jimmy fills in on the cheerleading squad to get close to the girls.
91	13	"Hello, Goodbye"	John Blanchard	Bill Martin & Mike Schiff	"Hello, Goodbye" by the Beatles	January 28, 2005	513	2.56
Claudia and Sean miss Lily's graduation (and spoil her senior-prank plan) when Claudia goes into labor. The Finnerty boys learn that Walt has a girlfriend: his cleaning lady. In the end, the Finnertys have a little girl, who they name Rose, and later rename Gracie after many believe she was named after a certain movie character. But wait--Grandpa is engaged, and his cleaning lady is expecting a little girl, who they plan to name Rose.

== Sources ==
- List of episodes at TVGuide.com
- List of episodes at TV MSN
- List of Grounded for Life episodes at epguides.com
- Grounded for Life at IMDb
