= Megyn Price =

American actress

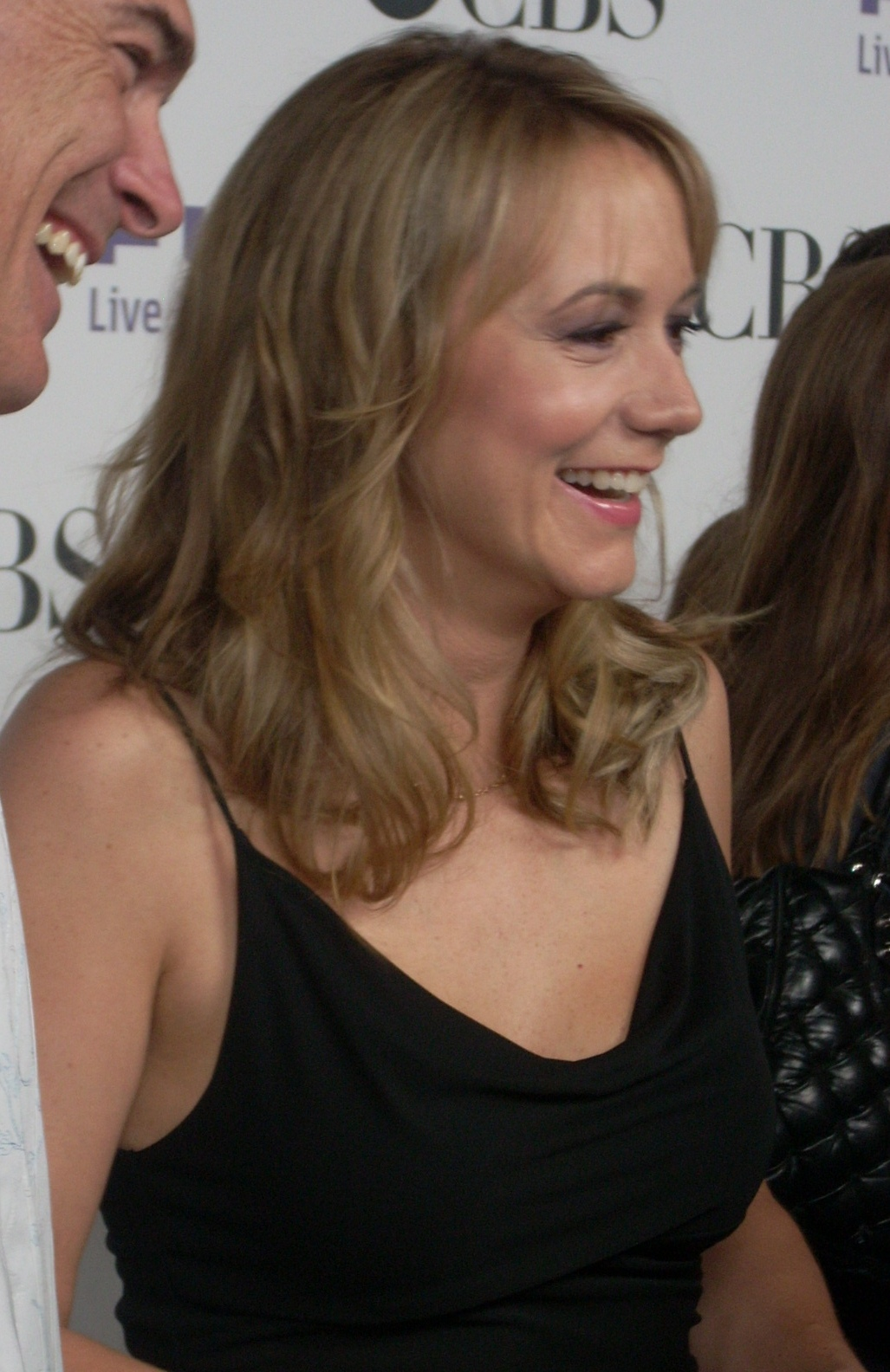
- Price and Patrick Warburton in 2008
- Born: March 24, 1971 (age 55); Seattle, Washington, U.S.
- Education: Stanford University
- Occupation: Actress
- Years active: 1993–present
- Spouse(s): Bill Lawrence (1995-1999), Edward Cotner (2001-2025)
- Children: 1

Megyn Price (born March 24, 1971) is an American actress, best known for her roles on television as Claudia Finnerty in the Fox/WB sitcom Grounded for Life (2001–2005), Audrey Bingham on the CBS sitcom Rules of Engagement (2007–2013), and Mary Roth on the Netflix sitcom The Ranch (2016–2020).

== Early life ==
Price was born in Seattle, Washington, and was raised as a member of The Church of Jesus Christ of Latter-day Saints. While attending Norman High School in Norman, Oklahoma, she produced and wrote a play, Here Comes the Sun, but thought acting was "the dumbest career choice anyone could possibly make". At Stanford University she studied economics and communication, and continued to act in school productions, as well as performing at American Conservatory Theater in San Francisco. After a year as an investment banker, Price decided to pursue acting as a profession.

== Career ==
Price began her acting career in the early 1990s. She made her television debut in an episode of Quantum Leap. She has also made a number of guest appearances on television shows, including Saved by the Bell: The New Class, Renegade, The Drew Carey Show, Will & Grace, and Drop Dead Diva. Her first series regular role was in the short-lived 1996 ABC comedy series Common Law opposite Greg Giraldo. From 1998 to 1999, she was lead actress in another short-lived sitcom, called LateLine, on NBC. In film, she had supporting roles in Mystery, Alaska and Larry the Cable Guy: Health Inspector.

From 2001 to 2005, Price starred as Claudia Finnerty in The WB comedy series Grounded for Life opposite Donal Logue. She later starred as Audrey Bingham in the CBS sitcom Rules of Engagement alongside Patrick Warburton and David Spade. She also directed one episode of season seven. The series was cancelled after seven seasons and 100 episodes in May 2013. Later in 2013, Price starred in the Lifetime television movie, A Country Christmas Story, and was cast in the Lifetime comedy-drama pilot UnREAL as an executive producer named Julia, opposite Shiri Appleby. On February 6, 2014, Lifetime officially green-lit UnREAL with a 10-episode series order, set to premiere in the summer of 2014. Upon learning the production would be moved to Canada, Price quit the show to stay in Montecito to raise her young daughter. On June 2, 2014, Constance Zimmer replaced Price in the show. In early 2016, Price returned to television with a role in the Netflix comedy series, The Ranch along with Ashton Kutcher and Elisha Cuthbert, playing Danny Masterson's love interest. In 2020, she guest starred in episode 4 of season 10 of Curb Your Enthusiasm.

== Personal life ==
Price lives in Montecito, California.

== Filmography ==
Film
Year	Title	Role	Notes
1999	Love Happens	Lisa Harris	
1999	Mystery, Alaska	Sarah Heinz	
2003	Living in Walter's World	Steve's Wife	Short film
2006	Larry the Cable Guy: Health Inspector	Jane Whitley	
2012	3 Day Test	Jackie Taylor	
2012	The Polar Bears	Sakari	Animated short film
2018	Bumblebee	Amber	

== Television ==
Television
Year	Title	Role	Notes
1993	Quantum Leap	Suzanne Sanders	Episode: "Liberation – October 16, 1968"
1994	Saved by the Bell: The New Class	Samantha	Episode: "Drinking 101"
1996	Common Law	Nancy Slaton	Main cast
1996	Renegade	Mary Beth Larson / Schultz	Episode: "Baby Makes Three"
1995–1996	The Drew Carey Show	Waitress	Episodes: "Miss Right" and "Drew and Mr. Bell's Nephew"
1998–1999	LateLine	Gale Ingersoll	Main cast
1999	Starship Regulars	Lees	Voice
2000	Will & Grace	Claire	Episode: "Seeds of Discontent"
2001–2005	Grounded for Life	Claudia Finnerty	Main cast
2005–2009	American Dad!	Linda Memari	Voice, 5 episodes
2012	Drop Dead Diva	Emily Horn	Episode: "Welcome Back"
2007–2013	Rules of Engagement	Audrey Bingham	Main cast
2013	A Country Christmas Story	Jenny	Television film
2014	UnREAL	Julia	Original Pilot
2016	Hometown Hero	Rhonda	Hallmark Movie
2016–2020	The Ranch	Mary Roth	Recurring role
2019	Mr. Iglesias	Walter's Mom - Jessica	Recurring role
2020	Curb Your Enthusiasm	Donna Mayer	1 episode
2020	Schooled	Deb Lewis	Episode: "Lainey's Mom"
2024	Holiday Touchdown: A Chiefs Love Story	Leah Higman	Hallmark Christmas movie
