= Epguides =

Television and radio episode website

epguides
- Website type: Entertainment
- Owner: George Fergus
- Creators: George Fergus; Dennis Kytasaari; John Lavalie
- Website: Epguides
- Commercial: Yes
- Registration: None
- Launched: October 12, 1999; 26 years ago
- Current status: Active

epguides is a website dedicated to English language radio and television shows. Established in 1995 as The Episode Guides Page, it originally offered fan-compiled episode guides for hundreds of United States and United Kingdom series. In 1999, the site's name was changed to epguides and moved to a separate domain name.

It was recommended by television historian Tim Brooks and Earle Marsh in the seventh edition of their book, The Complete Directory to Prime Time Network and Cable TV Shows 1946–Present, and again recommended in the eighth edition published in 2003.

epguides has been cited as a source of information in publications such as Library Currents, The Rough Guide to The Internet, Internet Cool Guide: A Savvy Guide to the Hottest Web Sites, Information Literacy: Navigating and Evaluating Today's Media, Television Women from Lucy to Friends: Fifty Years of Sitcoms and Feminism, Prehistoric Humans in Film and Television, and Queer TV: Framing Sexualities on US Television.
