= Grounded for Life =

American television sitcom (2001–2005)

- Genre: Sitcom
- Created by: Bill Martin & Mike Schiff
- Starring: Donal Logue; Megyn Price; Kevin Corrigan; Lynsey Bartilson; Griffin Frazen; Jake Burbage; Bret Harrison; Richard Riehle
- Theme music composer: Ben Vaughn; Dean Ween; Gene Ween
- Composers: Dean Ween; Gene Ween; Spek
- Country of origin: United States
- Original language: English
- No. of seasons: 5
- No. of episodes: 91 (list of episodes)

Production
- Executive producers: Marcy Carsey; Tom Werner; Caryn Mandabach; Bill Martin; Mike Schiff (seasons 1–4); David M. Israel (season 2); Jim O'Doherty (season 2); Jeff Astrof (season 5); Mike Sikowitz (season 5)
- Camera setup: Film; Multi-camera
- Running time: Approx. 22 minutes
- Production companies: Mike and Bill Productions (seasons 1–4); The Carsey-Werner Company

Original release
- Network: Fox
- Release: January 10, 2001 – December 3, 2002
- Network: The WB
- Release: February 28, 2003 – January 28, 2005

Grounded for Life is an American television sitcom that debuted on January 10, 2001, as a mid-season replacement on Fox. Created by Bill Martin and Mike Schiff, it ran for two seasons on Fox until being canceled only two episodes into its third season. It was immediately picked up for the rest of the third season by The WB, where it aired for two additional seasons until the series ended on January 28, 2005.

As Netflix describes the series, "Now in their 30s, a working-class Irish Catholic couple who had their first child at age 18 faces the challenges of raising a big family." The show starred Donal Logue and Megyn Price as Sean and Claudia Finnerty, an Irish Catholic couple living on Staten Island, New York, with their three children: Lily (Lynsey Bartilson), Jimmy (Griffin Frazen), and Henry (Jake Burbage). The show also starred Kevin Corrigan, Bret Harrison, and Richard Riehle. It featured guest stars such as Ashton Kutcher, Danny Masterson, Mila Kunis, Wilmer Valderrama (cast of That '70s Show), Dave Foley, Kevin McDonald, Scott Thompson (cast of The Kids in the Hall), Mike Vogel, Natasha Lyonne, Vincent Pastore, Miriam Flynn, Stephen Root, and Elizabeth Berridge (Kevin Corrigan's wife).

== Cast and characters ==
=== Main cast ===
Grounded for Life cast, seasons 3–4.

Actor	Character	Episode count	Season				
Actor	Character	Episode count	1	2	3	4	5
Donal Logue	Sean Finnerty	91	Main	Main	Main	Main	Main
Megyn Price	Claudia Finnerty	91	Main	Main	Main	Main	Main
Kevin Corrigan	Edwin "Eddie" Finnerty	91	Main	Main	Main	Main	Main
Lynsey Bartilson	Lily Finnerty	91	Main	Main	Main	Main	Main
Griffin Frazen	Jimmy Finnerty	91	Main	Main	Main	Main	Main
Jake Burbage	Henry Finnerty	78	Main	Main	Main	Main	
Richard Riehle	Walt Finnerty	45	Main	Main	Recurring	Recurring	Recurring
Bret Harrison	Brad O'Keefe	62 (credit only for 3 episodes of season 5)	Recurring	Recurring	Main	Main	Main

=== Recurring cast ===
Sister Helen (Miriam Flynn) is the nun and principal at Lily, Jimmy, and Henry's school. She frequently tries to tell Sean and Claudia how to raise their kids, whom she is always berating at school (Lily's skirts are too revealing, Jimmy's hair is too long, etc.). Sean once heard her use the F-word.

Dean Peramotti (Mike Vogel) was the drummer of Sean and Eddie's band. He and Lily date until she leaves him for Brad.

Dan O'Keefe (Floyd Van Buskirk in season 1, Gregory Jbara in all later appearances) is Brad's father. Sean and Dan never get along and are always fighting. He is busted for having an affair when Sean challenges him to a tennis match and then notices that Dan has been useless in spite of all the weekend "tennis lessons." Connie discovers this, and they break up. Connie then has a brief fling with Eddie, but she and Dan soon get back together.

=== Finnerty household ===
The household that makes for the primary location for the series features exciting background props that refer to the family's interests. Throughout the series, there is a picture of Lou Thesz hanging in the living room and a real-life picture of a young Lynsey Bartilson, who plays Lily in the series. The living room also features a framed and hung vintage baseball bat, a broken guitar (used by Sean in his younger days), and a pair of crucifixes, representing the Catholic religion of the family.

The refrigerator in the kitchen is always changing but prominently features fruit magnets and a sticker resembling video game developer Rockstar Games logo. Jimmy's room often changes throughout the series, especially after Henry departs from the show. Still, at least one piece of WWE merchandise can be spotted in any given scene in the location. The most notable example is a pillow bearing the WWE logo. However, in the last few season five episodes, the pillow is turned over, hiding the logo. Jimmy's room also features a vintage Indianapolis Speedway poster (dated May 30, 1914), a dartboard, a small basketball hoop and at times featured a "Shonen Jump" poster and posters of bands such as Less Than Jake and Green Day.

Lily's room has a computer, a snowboarding poster, and a scrapbook poster, in addition to other commonplace items that change throughout the series. In early episodes, she has several signs featuring Justin Timberlake and NSYNC.

== Episodes ==
Season	Episodes		Originally released		
Season	Episodes		First released	Last released	Network
1	15		January 10, 2001	May 23, 2001	Fox
2	22		September 26, 2001	May 8, 2002	Fox
3	13	5	September 17, 2002	December 3, 2002	Fox
3	13	8	February 28, 2003	May 9, 2003	The WB
4	28		September 5, 2003	May 7, 2004	The WB
5	13		September 17, 2004	January 28, 2005	The WB

Two episodes from Season 3, "Oh, What a Knight" and "Part-Time Lover," were not broadcast during the show's original network run, and were later aired in syndication on ABC Family.

== Production ==
The series began as a single-camera comedy when it was ordered by Fox in May 2000 as a midseason replacement. The series' early episodes reflect this in their style and the late addition of a laugh track; by September, the network was reworking the series into a multi-camera sitcom. However, single-camera shooting styles were incorporated into certain scenes even after the development format shift, principally those shot in outdoor settings, close-ups shot in indoor sets, and tracking shots between set pieces. In December 2000, Fox cancelled the sitcom Normal, Ohio and announced that Grounded for Life would premiere in its place in January 2001.

Upon the looming threat of a writers strike, and impressed by the early ratings, Fox ordered seven additional episodes in February 2001 that would be delayed to the Fall in the case of a strike. In May 2001, Fox renewed the series for a second season, with five of the additional ordered episodes airing as part of the second season. In December, Fox cut the episode order of the second season by two episodes.

In May 2002, Fox renewed the series for a third season consisting of 13 episodes. However, after airing the first two episodes of the season, Fox continually delayed the series' return. Finally, on November 18, Carsey-Werner announced that the series would be moving to The WB within the same season, with an additional six episodes ordered; Fox would receive a cut of future syndication profits in exchange for the move. Fox aired three more episodes before the series went on hiatus in December. The WB premiered new episodes beginning February 28.

The WB renewed the series for a 22-episode fourth season in April 2003. The network delayed the additional six-episode order to air within the fourth season, creating a larger 28 episode season. In May 2004, the network renewed the series for a 13-episode fifth season. On October 26, the network announced that it would not order a full season, effectively cancelling the series.

== Reception ==
=== Nielsen Ratings ===
Season	Ep #	Time Slot	First Airdate	Last Airdate	Rank	Viewership	Network
1 (2000–2001)	15	Wednesday 8:30	January 10, 2001	May 23, 2001	#87	8.9	Fox
2 (2001–2002)	22	Wednesday 8:30	September 26, 2001	May 8, 2002	#96	7.2	Fox
3 (2002–2003)	13	Wednesday 8:30 (1–5); Friday 9:30 (6–13)	September 17, 2002	May 9, 2003	#95	8.10	Fox/WB
4 (2003–2004)	28	Friday 9:00	September 5, 2003	May 7, 2004	#187	2.79	WB
5 (2004–2005)	13	Friday 8:30	September 17, 2004	January 28, 2005	#145	2.7	WB

=== Awards and nominations ===
Grounded for Life has been nominated for several Young Artist Awards for best TV comedy choice, best family TV comedy series, best performance by a guest star in a TV comedy series, and best-supporting actor in a comedy or drama series, it has also won a Young Artist Award for supporting young actor in a TV comedy series. It has also been nominated for an Artios Award, Teen Choice Award, GLAAD Media Award and an Emmy Award.

Year	Result	Award	Category
2001	Nominated	Artios	Best Casting For TV, Comedy Pilot – Meg Liberman, Camille H. Patton
2001	Nominated	Teen Choice Award	TV – Choice Comedy
2001	Nominated	Emmy	Outstanding Choreography – Kenny Ortega for episode: "Mrs. Finnerty, You Have a Lovely Daughter"
2002	Won	Young Artist Award	Best Performance in a TV Comedy Series – Supporting Young Actor – Griffin Frazen
2002	Nominated	Young Artist Award	Best Family TV Comedy Series
2002	Nominated	Young Artist Award	Best Performance in a TV Comedy Series – Guest Starring Young Actor – Eddie Carr
2002	Nominated	Young Artist Award	Best Performance in a TV Comedy Series – Guest Starring Young Actor – Kevin G. Schmidt
2003	Nominated	GLAAD Media Award	Outstanding Individual Episode (In a Series Without a Regular Gay Character) for episode: "Relax!"
2004	Nominated	Young Artist Award	Best Performance in a TV Series (Comedy or Drama) – Supporting Young Actor – Griffin Frazen

== Syndication ==
=== United States ===
The series aired in syndication on ABC Family (now Freeform) on an intermittent basis since 2005, having gone through several timeslot changes during its run on the network. When first aired on ABC Family, the tag scenes were edited out; but when ABC Family re-acquired Grounded for Life, newer prints with the tag scenes are now shown.

On November 16, 2009, MTV began to air the show at random during the week Unlike ABC Family's airings, these airings are the same episodes and are aired more frequently.

In February 2015, all five seasons of the show were added to Netflix for instant play. They are presented in HD for the first time, as they were only shown in standard definition in their network and cable runs.

Laff aired reruns of the show from May 2016, until December 31, 2018, but was added back in 2024.

On August 3, 2017, Amazon added all five seasons in HD through its Prime video service through a distribution deal with FilmRise.

=== International ===
Country	Channel(s)	Notes
Australia	Seven Network, Fox8, The Comedy Channel	Currently airing on The Comedy Channel.
Belgium	Plug TV	In French; currently airing
Belgium	VTM 2	In English with Dutch subtitles; currently airing
Bulgaria	BTV Comedy (the former GTV)	Currently airing
Finland	TV Viisi	Goes by the name Perhe Paketissa, meaning "Family in a Package," currently airing in English, with Finnish subtitles
France	France 2, France 4	Goes by the name "Parents à tout Prix."
Germany	Comedy Central	Goes by the name Keine Gnade für Dad, meaning "No Mercy for Dad."
Hungary	HBO Comedy	Currently airing. Goes by the name Sorscsapás család, meaning "Setback Family"
Italy	Fox	Goes by the name I Finnerty, meaning "The Finnertys"
Switzerland	4uTV	Goes by the name Keine Gnade für Dad, meaning "No Mercy for Dad."
India	STAR World	
Ireland	RTÉ Two	Aired up until the show's cancellation in 2005
Israel	HOT3	Goes by the name ככה זה בחיים (Kacha Ze BaChayim), meaning "That's How Life Is."
North Macedonia	Nasa TV	Goes by the name Доживотно казн
Norway	TV Norge	Goes by the name Familietrøbbel, meaning "Family Trouble."
Netherlands	Comedy Central Extra	Currently airing
Slovenia	HBO Comedy, POP TV	Goes by the name "Sami doma."
Romania	HBO Comedy	Currently airing; titled "Consemnați pe viață"
Serbia	HBO Comedy	Currently airing
Montenegro	HBO Comedy	Currently airing
Sweden	TV3; TV4 Komedi	Aired with the english title "Freaky Finnertys". No longer aired.
Turkey	ComedyMax	Currently airing
United Kingdom	Trouble; ITV1	Trouble closed 1 April 2009; no longer broadcasts on ITV1

== Home media ==
The entire series of Grounded for Life has been released on DVD; Anchor Bay Entertainment originally held distribution rights to the series, releasing all five seasons in individual sets between 2006 and 2007. For the first two seasons, Anchor Bay opted to release in their originally produced episodes of 20 and 17, respectively, as opposed to the original broadcast of 15 and 22 episodes. The new opening credits introduced in the second season still remain intact for the five restored episodes on the Season One set.

The series was acquired by Mill Creek Entertainment in 2011 who released only the first two seasons, both in their original broadcast episodes, before making the series available in it entirety.

The series has also been made available on DVD in the United Kingdom, Australia and Germany, with all episodes consisting of their original broadcast episodes. All releases available contain the two unaired episodes from the third season.

Season	Release date				Additional
Season	Region 1	Region 2 (UK)	Region 2 (Germany)	Region 4	Additional
1	February 7, 2006	March 5, 2007	November 8, 2012	June 7, 2010	Distribution: Anchor Bay Entertainment (U.S.); Brightspark Productions (UK); Sunfilm Entertainment (Germany); Visual Entertainment Group (Australia); General information: 20 episodes (Anchor Bay); 15 episodes (UK, Germany & Australia); 4-DVD set (Anchor Bay); 3-DVD set (UK); 2-DVD set (Germany & Australia); 1.33:1 aspect ratio; Ratings: TV-PG (U.S.); BBFC: 12; FSK: 6; ACB: PG; Special features: Meet the Finnertys – Interview with Donal Logue; Claudia: Not the Sitcom Mom – Interview with Megyn Price; Life with Lily – Interview with Lynsey Bartilson; Interview with creators Mike Schiff and Bill Martin; Bloopers; Audio commentaries with cast and crew; Season One highlights; Re-issue: September 13, 2011 (Mill Creek Entertainment, 15 episodes, 2-DVD set); also, "The Complete First & Second Seasons" released on September 13, 2011 via Mill Creek Entertainment; Released as "Keine Gnade für Dad" in Germany
2	May 16, 2006	TBA	December 6, 2012	August 28, 2010 (as one)	Distribution: Anchor Bay Entertainment (U.S.); Sunfilm Entertainment (Germany); Visual Entertainment Group (Australia); General information: 17 episodes (Anchor Bay); 22 episodes (Germany & Australia); 3-DVD set (Anchor Bay); 3-DVD set (Germany); 4-DVD set (Australia, with Season 3); 1.33:1 aspect ratio; Ratings: TV-PG (U.S.); FSK: 6; ACB: PG; Special features: Bloopers; From Ashes to Ashton – An interview with Ashton Kutcher; Kevin Corrigan – He Ain't Eddie, He's My Brother – A brand new interview with Kevin Corrigan; Season Two highlights; Sibling Revelry – Interviews with Jake Burbage "Henry" and Griffin Frazen "Jimmy"; Re-issue: September 13, 2011 (Mill Creek Entertainment, 22 episodes, 3-DVD set); also, "The Complete First & Second Seasons" released on September 13, 2011 via Mill Creek Entertainment; Released as "Keine Gnade für Dad" in Germany
3	August 8, 2006	TBA	January 13, 2013	August 28, 2010 (as one)	Distribution: Anchor Bay Entertainment (U.S.); Sunfilm Entertainment (Germany); Visual Entertainment Group (Australia); General information: 13 episodes; 2-DVD set (U.S. & Germany); 4-DVD set (Australia, with Season 2); 1.33:1 aspect ratio; Ratings: TV-PG (U.S.); FSK: 6; ACB: PG; Special features: 2-never-before-aired episodes: "Oh, What a Knight" and "Part-Time Lover."; Audio commentary with cast and crew; Released as "Keine Gnade für Dad" in Germany
4	November 7, 2006	TBA	February 7, 2013	May 9, 2011	Distribution: Anchor Bay Entertainment (U.S.); Sunfilm Entertainment (Germany); Visual Entertainment Group (Australia); General information: 28 episodes; 4-DVD set (U.S.); 3-DVD set (Germany); 2-DVD set (Australia); 1.33:1 aspect ratio; Ratings: TV-PG (U.S.); FSK: 6; ACB: PG; Special features: Brand-new audio commentaries; Letter from the creators; Released as "Keine Gnade für Dad" in Germany
5	September 25, 2007	TBA	March 7, 2013	May 9, 2011	Distribution: Anchor Bay Entertainment (U.S.); Sunfilm Entertainment (Germany); Visual Entertainment Group (Australia); General information: 13 episodes; 2-DVD set (U.S., Germany & Australia); 1.33:1 aspect ratio; Ratings: TV-PG (U.S.); FSK: 6; ACB: PG; Special features: Letter from the creators; Released as "Keine Gnade für Dad" in Germany
Complete	September 4, 2012	TBA	TBA	TBA	Distribution: Mill Creek Entertainment; General information: 91 episodes; 13 DVD-set; 1.33:1 aspect ratio; Ratings: TV-PG (U.S.); Special features See individual releases

== British remake ==
In 2011, the show was remade by the BBC as In with the Flynns. Six episodes were produced for its first season, using stories and scenes from the American series. A six-episode second season used original stories.
