= Snavely =

Snavely is a surname. Notable people with the surname include:

- Carl Snavely (1894–1975), American college football player and Hall-of-Fame coach
- Francis Boggs Snavely (1897–1979), American football and basketball coach
- Kathleen Snavely (1902–2015), oldest Irish-born person
