= Jake Burbage =

American actor (born 1992)

- Born: Jacob Daniel Burbage; September 27, 1992 (age 33); Willingboro Township, New Jersey, U.S.
- Occupations: Actor, writer, director
- Years active: 1999–present

Jacob Daniel Burbage (born September 27, 1992) is an American actor, writer, director, and musician. As an actor, he is best known for his role on Grounded for Life as Henry Finnerty. Burbage attended Moorestown Friends School and graduated in 2011. He later attended The College of New Jersey where he majored in English.

== Career ==
Burbage played the role of youngest child Henry Finnerty for the first four seasons of Grounded for Life, but left the show at the end of season 4 to move back home to New Jersey. He has also guest starred in Sex and the City and was the original voice of Benny the Bull in the first four seasons of the Nickelodeon series Dora the Explorer.

He currently serves on the Executive Committee of Shakespeare 70, a non-professional theatre company in central New Jersey.

== Filmography ==
Film
Year	Title	Role	Notes
1999	On the Q.T.	Jari at age 6	

Television
Year	Title	Role	Network/Platform	Notes
1999	Sex and the City	Simon Cobb	HBO	1 episode
2000–2007	Dora the Explorer	Benny	Nickelodeon	58 episodes
2001	Hollywood Squares	Himself	NBC	2 episodes
2001	Any Day Now		Lifetime	1 episode
2001–2004	Grounded for Life	Henry Finnerty	FOX (later The WB)	78 episodes
2002	The Nightmare Room	Adam	Kids' WB	2 episodes
2017	Nuke City	Cade	Amazon Prime	5 episodes (also writer)
2018	Fake News @ Night	Jack Garbage	Facebook Video	

== Stage ==
Year	Production	Role	Venue
2007	A Midsummer Night's Dream	Bottom	Friends of Shakespeare
2008	Macbeth	Malcolm	Friends of Shakespeare
2008	Rosencrantz & Guildenstern are Dead	Alfred	Moorestown Friends School
2008	Baby with the Bathwater	John	Moorestown Friends School
2009	The Tempest	Ferdinand	Moorestown Friends School
2009	Joseph and the Amazing Technicolor Dreamcoat	Joseph	Moorestown Friends School
2010	Six Characters in Search of an Author	The Director	Moorestown Friends School
2010	The Curious Misadventures of Alice in Wonderland	director/writer	Moorestown Friends School
2010	Guys and Dolls	Sky Masterson	Moorestown Friends School
2011	Our Town	Stage Manager	Moorestown Friends School
2011	Glengarry Glen Ross	director	Moorestown Friends School
2013	Cabaret (musical)	Cliff Bradshaw	The College of New Jersey
2014	Smitten	Peter	The College of New Jersey
2014	Proof (play)	Robert	The College of New Jersey
2014	Much Ado About Nothing	Borachio	Shakespeare 70
2014	Romeo & Juliet	Romeo	The College of New Jersey
2015	Dead American Writers	director, writer	The College of New Jersey
2016	Cowboy Mouth (play)	Slim	Brooklyn, NY
2016	Hamlet	Laertes	Shakespeare 70
2017	God of Carnage	Michael	Brooklyn, NY
2017	Our Town	Stage Manager	Millersburg, OH
2017	Murder Most Foul: An Evening of Shakespeare	co-director	Shakespeare 70
2018	Rosencrantz & Guildenstern are Dead	Guildenstern	Circle Players
2018	This Is Our Youth	Dennis	Philadelphia Fringe Festival
2018	Clybourne Park	Karl/Steve	Shakespeare 70
2019	The Last Days of Judas Iscariot	Judas Iscariot	ActorsNet of Bucks County
2019	Richard III (play)	Richard	Shakespeare 70
2020	The Antipodes	Dave	Shakespeare 70
2021	Our Town	director	Shakespeare 70
2022	Our Town	George Gibbs; director	Kelsey Theatre
2022	The Pillowman	Katurian	Shakespeare 70
2023	The Antipodes	Dave	Shakespeare 70
2023	Julius Caesar (play)	Brutus	Shakespeare 70
2024	All My Sons	George Deever	Shakespeare 70
2024	The Minutes (play)	Mr. Hanratty	Shakespeare 70
2024	A Midsummer Night's Dream	Producer	Shakespeare 70
2024	Waiting For Lefty	Ensemble	Shakespeare 70
2025	Twelfth Night	Orsino/Antonio	Shakespeare 70
2025	The Taming of the Shrew	Katherine	Shakespeare 70
2026	Arms and the Man	Producer	Shakespeare 70
2026	The Crucible	Director	Shakespeare 70
