= Griffin Frazen =

American actor

Griffin James Frazen (born October 8, 1987) is an American actor, best known for his role as Jimmy Finnerty on the sitcom Grounded for Life.

Frazen was born in Los Angeles, California. He graduated from New York University's Gallatin School of Individualized Study in 2009 and Princeton University's Graduate School of Architecture in 2013.
