= Gustav Schröder =

German sea captain (1885–1959)

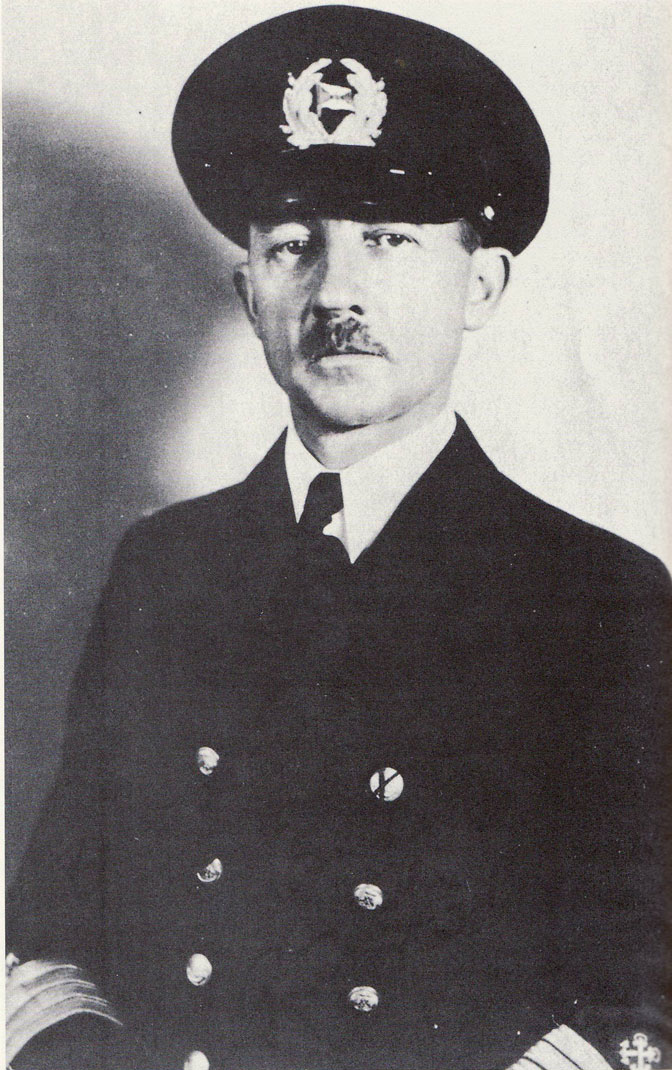
- Born: 27 September 1885; Hadersleben, German Empire
- Died: 10 January 1959 (age 73); Hamburg, West Germany
- Known for: Saving almost 3/4 of the 937 German Jews aboard the MS St. Louis

Gustav Schröder (German: [ˈɡʊs.taf ˈʃʁøː,dɐ]; 27 September 1885 – 10 January 1959) was a German sea captain most remembered and celebrated for his role in attempting to save 937 German-Jewish passengers on his ship MS St. Louis having sailed from Hamburg to escape Nazis in 1939. Disembarkation of nearly all of the passengers at the official destination port of Havana, Cuba, was refused in the midst of Cuban political turmoil and corruption. Knowing the risks to his passengers of returning them to Hamburg, Capt. Schröder sailed on to several other countries, in order to save the lives of his passengers. Most notably, America and Canada refused his plea for landing passengers as refugees.

== Career ==
Schröder began his seafaring career in 1902 at the age of 16 aboard the training ship Großherzogin Elisabeth. After completing his training, he served first on sailing ships, and then was an able seaman on SS Deutschland of the Hamburg America Line, at the time one of the fastest ships in the world and holder of the Blue Riband. Schröder reached the position of captain after 24 years of service. In 1913, he was posted at Calcutta, India, but was interned there as an enemy alien throughout World War I. He began studying languages as a hobby and eventually became fluent in seven. When Schröder returned to Germany in 1919, he found himself without a job following forced demilitarisation and the limit placed on the number of warships in the German Navy by the Treaty of Versailles. In 1921, he was hired by the shipping company HAPAG (Hamburg-Amerikanische Paketfahrt-Aktiengesellschaft), and in 1935, was promoted to first officer on Hansa. In August 1936, he became master of MS Ozeana.

== Voyage of the Damned ==
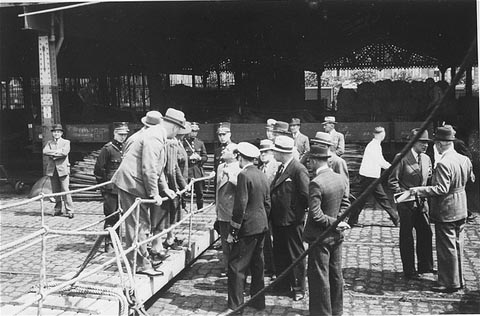
St. Louis captain Gustav Schröder negotiates landing permits for his passengers with Belgian officials in the Port of Antwerp.

Schröder was the next appointed captain of MS St. Louis, and in 1939 he sailed from Germany to Cuba carrying 937 Jewish refugees seeking somewhere safe. He insisted that his passengers be treated with respect and allowed them to conduct religious services on board even though he knew that his leniency would be viewed unfavorably by the ruling Nazi Party. The refugees were refused entry at Cuba and neither the United States nor Canada would let them land, forcing Schröder to return with them to Europe. Instead of returning his passengers to Germany, where they would most likely be sent to concentration camps, he tried to find asylum for them. Eventually most of the passengers were accepted as refugees by Belgium, France, the Netherlands and the UK. But some 250 of the passengers were not granted refuge by any country, and were forced to return to Nazi-occupied territories, where they ultimately died at the hands of the Nazis.

The events of the voyage are told in the 1974 book Voyage of the Damned, written by Gordon Thomas and Max Morgan-Witts, which was the basis of a 1976 film drama of the same name and the book The German Girl by Armando Lucus Correa.

== Later years ==
Still in command of St. Louis, Schröder prepared for another transatlantic voyage, but his passengers were not allowed to board. En route, Britain and France had declared war on Nazi Germany. Returning from Bermuda, Schröder evaded a Royal Navy blockade and docked at neutral Murmansk. With a skeleton crew, he managed to slip past Allied patrols and reached Hamburg on 1 January 1940. He was assigned a desk job and never went to sea again. After the war, he worked as a writer and tried to sell his story. He was released from denazification proceedings on the testimony of some of his surviving Jewish refugee passengers.

Schröder was married and lived with his family in Hamburg. He died in 1959 at the age of 73.

== Honors and tributes ==
Schröder received much praise for his actions during the Holocaust, both while he was alive and posthumously. In 1957, he was awarded the Order of Merit by the Federal Republic of Germany "for services to the people and the land in the rescue of refugees." In March 1993, Yad Vashem honored Schröder with the title of Righteous Among the Nations. In 2000, his home town of Hamburg named a street after Schröder and unveiled a detailed plaque at the landing stages.

== In popular culture ==
In the 1976 drama film about the St. Louis, Voyage of the Damned, Schröder is played by Swedish-French actor Max von Sydow.

In the 2017 book Refugee by Alan Gratz, Schröder is included in the story about a fictional boy (Josef Landau) aboard the St. Louis.
