= MS St. Louis =

German ocean liner; "Voyage of the damned"

History

Germany
- Name: St. Louis
- Owner: Hamburg America Line
- Port of registry: Hamburg
- Builder: Bremer Vulkan, Bremen, Germany
- Laid down: June 16, 1925
- Launched: August 2, 1928
- Maiden voyage: March 28, 1929
- Identification: code letters RHDV (until 1933); call sign DIFG (by 1934)
- Fate: Scrapped in 1952

General characteristics
- Type: Ocean liner
- Tonnage: 16,732 GRT; 9,637 NRT
- Length: 574 ft (175 m) overall; 543.8 ft (165.8 m) registered
- Beam: 72 ft (22 m)
- Depth: 42.1 ft (12.8 m)
- Decks: 5
- Installed power: 2 × two-stroke diesel engines; total 3,060 NHP
- Propulsion: 2 × screws
- Speed: 16 knots (30 km/h; 18 mph)
- Capacity: 973 passengers: 270 cabin class, 287 tourist class, 416 third class
- Sensors & processing systems: by 1930: wireless direction finding; by 1934: gyrocompass

MS St. Louis was a diesel-powered ocean liner built by the Bremer Vulkan shipyards in Bremen for Hamburg America Line (HAPAG). She was named after the city of St. Louis, Missouri. She was the sister ship of Milwaukee. St. Louis regularly sailed the trans-Atlantic route from Hamburg to Halifax, Nova Scotia and New York City, and made cruises to the Canary Islands, Madeira, Spain, and Morocco. St. Louis was built for both transatlantic liner service and for leisure cruises.

In May 1939, St. Louis carried more than 900 Jewish refugees from Nazi Germany intending to escape antisemitic persecution. The refugees first tried to disembark in Cuba but were denied permission to land. After Cuba, the captain, Gustav Schröder, went to the United States and Canada, trying to find a nation to take the Jews in, but both nations refused. He finally returned the ship to Europe, where various countries, including the United Kingdom, Belgium, the Netherlands, and France, accepted some refugees. Following the German occupation of France, Belgium and the Netherlands during World War II, many refugees were persecuted during the Holocaust, and some historians have estimated that approximately a quarter of them were killed in death camps. These events, also known as the "Voyage of the Damned", have inspired film, opera, and fiction.

== Background and early years ==
Under construction number 670, St. Louis was launched on August 2, 1928, at the Bremer Vulkan in Bremen-Vegesack. She was 174.90 m long and 22.10 m wide and was measured with 16,732 GRT. Four double-acting six-cylinder two-stroke diesel engines (MAN type, built under license from Bremer Vulkan) each with an output of 3150 hp gave her a speed of 16.5 knots (30.6 km/h). Her sister ship, Milwaukee, was launched on February 20, 1929.

St. Louis left Hamburg on March 28, 1929, for her maiden voyage to New York City, and was then mainly used in the North Atlantic service from Hamburg to Halifax, and then to New York. She also made cruises of 16–17 days each to the Canary Islands, Madeira and Morocco, especially in autumn and spring. From 1934 she was also chartered in the summer by the Office for Travel, Hiking and Holidays (RWU) of Strength Through Joy (KDF) to travel to Norway with 900 holidaymakers at a time.

== The "Voyage of the Damned" ==
Under the command of Captain Gustav Schröder, St. Louis set sail from Hamburg to Havana, Cuba on May 13, 1939, carrying 937 passengers, most of them Jewish refugees seeking asylum from Nazi persecution in Germany.

Captain Schröder was a German who went to great lengths to ensure dignified treatment for his passengers. Food served included items subject to rationing in Germany, and childcare was available while parents dined. Dances and concerts were put on, and on Friday evenings, religious services were held in the dining room. A bust of Hitler was covered by a tablecloth. Swimming lessons took place in the pool. Lothar Molton, a boy traveling with his parents, said that the passengers thought of it as "a vacation cruise to freedom".

On reaching Cuba, she anchored at 04:00 on May 27 at the far end of the Havana Harbor, but was denied entry to the usual docking areas. The Cuban government, headed by President Federico Laredo Brú, refused to accept the foreign refugees, although they held legal tourist visas to Cuba, as laws related to these had been recently changed. On May 5, 1939, four months before World War II began, Havana had abandoned its pragmatic immigration policy, by virtue of decree 937, which "restricted entry of all foreigners except U.S. citizens, unless authorized by Cuban secretaries of state [and] subject [to] a bond of US $500." None of the passengers knew that their landing permits had been invalidated a few weeks earlier.

After the ship had been in the harbor for five days, only 28 passengers were allowed to disembark in Cuba. Twenty-two were Jews who had valid United States visas; four were Spanish citizens and two were Cuban nationals, all with valid entry documents. The last admitted was a medical evacuee, Max Loewe, who attempted suicide, and was allowed hospitalization in Havana.

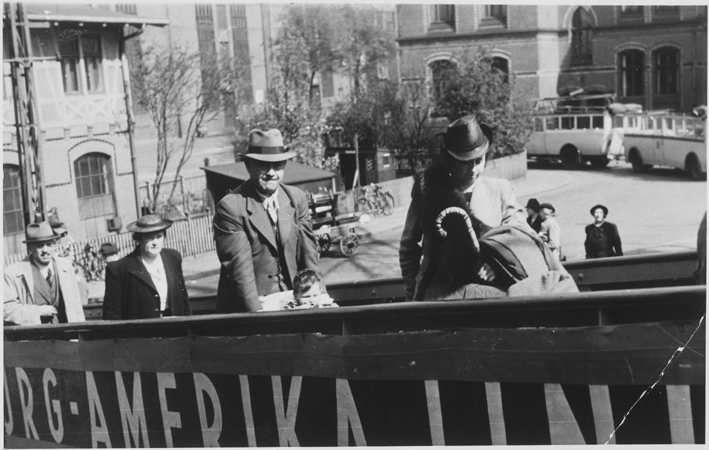
Boarding in the Port of Hamburg

Records show American officials Secretary of State Cordell Hull and Secretary of the Treasury Henry Morgenthau had made efforts to persuade Cuba to accept the refugees, quite like the failed attempts by the American Jewish "Joint" Distribution Committee, which pleaded with the government. After most passengers were refused landing in Cuba, Captain Schröder directed St. Louis and the remaining 907 refugees towards the United States. He circled off the coast of Florida, hoping for permission from authorities to enter the United States. Neither Hull nor U.S. President Franklin D. Roosevelt chose to intervene to admit the refugees. Captain Schröder considered running St. Louis aground along the coast to allow the refugees to escape but, acting on Hull's instructions, United States Coast Guard vessels shadowed the ship and prevented this.

After St. Louis was turned away from the United States, a group of academics and clergy in Canada tried to persuade Prime Minister William Lyon Mackenzie King to provide sanctuary to the passengers. The ship could have reached Halifax, Nova Scotia in two days. The director of Canada's Immigration Branch, Frederick Blair, was hostile to Jewish immigration and persuaded the head of government on June 9 not to intervene.

As Captain Schröder negotiated and schemed to find passengers a haven, conditions on the ship declined. At one point he made plans to wreck the ship on the British coast to force the government to take in the passengers as refugees. He refused to return the ship to Germany until all the passengers had been given entry to some other country. US officials worked with Britain and European nations to find refuge for the Jews in Europe. The ship returned to Europe, docking at the Port of Antwerp (Belgium) on June 17, 1939, with the 907 passengers.

The British Prime Minister Neville Chamberlain agreed to take 288 (32 percent) of the passengers, who disembarked and travelled to the UK via other steamers. After much negotiation by Schröder, the remaining 619 passengers were also allowed to disembark at Antwerp. 224 (25 percent) were accepted by France, 214 (23.59 percent) by Belgium, and 181 (20 percent) by the Netherlands. The ship returned to Hamburg without any passengers. The following year, after the Battle of France, and the Nazi occupations of Belgium, France, and the Netherlands in May 1940, all the Jews in those countries were subject to high risk, including the recent refugees.

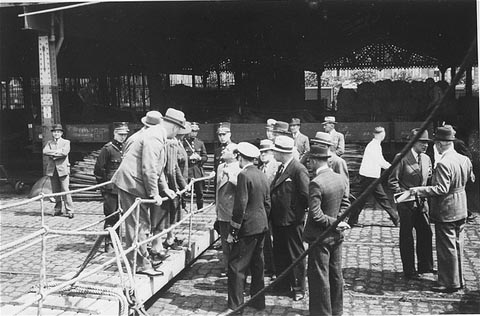
St. Louis Captain Gustav Schröder negotiates landing permits for the passengers with Belgian officials in the Port of Antwerp.

Based on the survival rates for Jews in various countries during the war and deportations, historians have estimated that 180 of the St. Louis refugees in France, 152 of those in Belgium and 60 of those in the Netherlands survived the Holocaust. Including the passengers who landed in England, of the original 937 refugees (one man died during the voyage), roughly 709 survived the war and 227 died. Later research tracing each passenger has determined that 255 (41.1%) of those who returned to continental Europe were murdered during the Holocaust.

Of the 620 St. Louis passengers who returned to continental Europe, we determined that eighty-seven were able to emigrate before Germany invaded western Europe on May 10, 1940. Two hundred fifty-four passengers in Belgium, France, and the Netherlands after that date died during the Holocaust. Most of these people were murdered in the killing centers of Auschwitz and Sobibór; the rest died in internment camps, in hiding or attempting to evade the Nazis. Three hundred sixty-five of the 620 passengers who returned to continental Europe survived the war. Of the 288 passengers sent to Britain, the vast majority were alive at war's end.

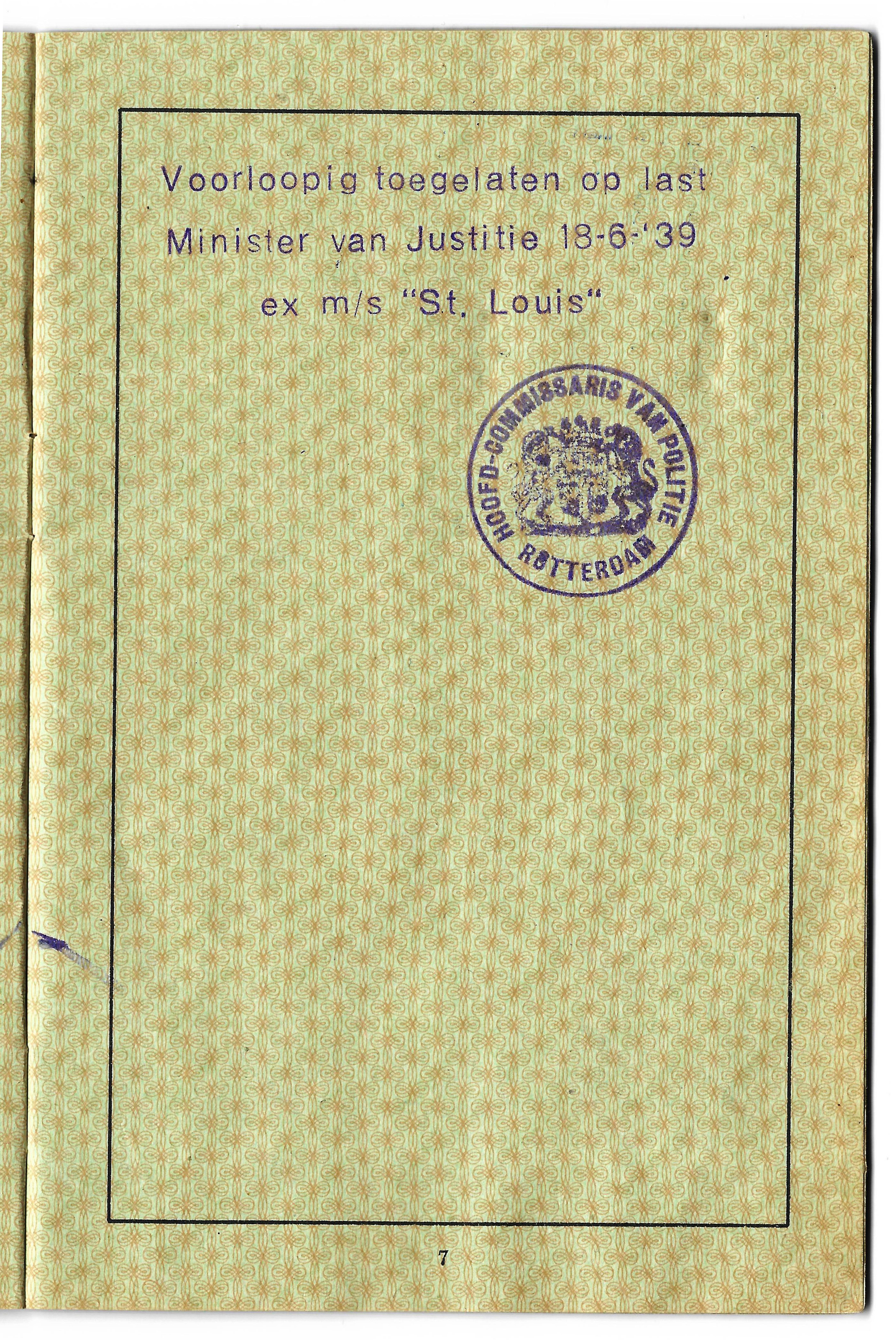
The Dutch applied a special marking inside passports of those they accepted.

== Legacy ==
After the war, the Federal Republic of Germany awarded Captain Gustav Schröder the Order of Merit. In 1993, Schröder was posthumously named as one of the Righteous Among the Nations at the Yad Vashem Holocaust Memorial in Israel.

A display at the United States Holocaust Memorial Museum in Washington, D.C., tells the story of the voyage of the MS St. Louis. The Hamburg Museum features a display and a video about St. Louis ship in its exhibits about the history of shipping in the city. In 2009, a special exhibit at the Maritime Museum of the Atlantic in Halifax, Nova Scotia, entitled Ship of Fate, explored the Canadian connection to the tragic voyage. The display is now a traveling exhibit in Canada.

In 2011, a memorial monument called the Wheel of Conscience was produced by the Canadian Jewish Congress, designed by Daniel Libeskind with graphic design by David Berman and Trevor Johnston. The memorial is a polished stainless steel wheel. Symbolizing the policies that turned away more than 900 Jewish refugees, the wheel incorporates four inter-meshing gears, each showing a word to represent factors of exclusion: antisemitism, xenophobia, racism, and hatred. The back of the memorial is inscribed with the passenger list. It was first exhibited in 2011 at the Canadian Museum of Immigration at Pier 21, Canada's national immigration museum in Halifax. After a display period, the sculpture was shipped to its fabricators, Soheil Mosun Limited, in Toronto for repair and refurbishment.

In 2012, the United States Department of State formally apologized in a ceremony attended by Deputy Secretary William J. Burns and 14 survivors of the incident. The survivors presented a proclamation of gratitude to various European countries for accepting some of the ship's passengers. A signed copy of Senate Resolution 111, recognizing June 6, 2009, as the 70th anniversary of the incident, was delivered to the Department of State Archives.

In May 2017, Prime Minister Justin Trudeau announced the Government of Canada would offer a formal apology in the country's House of Commons for its role in the fate of the ship's passengers. The apology was issued on November 7, 2018.

== Later career ==
MS St. Louis was adapted as a German naval accommodation ship from 1940 to 1944. She was heavily damaged by the Allied bombings at Kiel on August 30, 1944. The ship was repaired and used as a hotel ship in Hamburg in 1946. She was sold and scrapped at Bremerhaven in 1952.

== Notable passengers ==
- Arno Motulsky (1923–2018), medical geneticist
- Frederick Reif (1927–2019), physicist at University of California, Berkeley and Carnegie Mellon University
- Erich Dublon (1890–1942), whose writing regarding his experience of the ship was published.

== Representations ==
- Jan de Hartog's play Schipper naast God (1942), translated in English as "Skipper next to God" (1945) and a film in 1951
- Voyage of the Damned (1974), a nonfiction account by Gordon Thomas and Max Morgan-Witts
- Voyage of the Damned (1976), a film directed by Stuart Rosenberg adapted from the Thomas/Morgan-Witts book
- Julian Barnes's novel A History of the World in 10½ Chapters (1989) recounts the trials of the MS St. Louis Jews in the chapter "Three Simple Stories"
- Bodie and Brock Thoene's 1991 novel Munich Signature
- Chiel Meijering composed an opera, St. Louis Blues (1994)
- Denied Entry: A Survivor's Story of Fate, Faith, and Freedom (2011), an autobiography and commentary by Philip S. Freund. ISBN 1-45-635148-6
- To Hope and Back by Kathy Kacer (2011) is a young adult nonfiction account of two children's experience on the voyage. ISBN 1-92-692040-6
- Leonardo Padura's novel Herejes (2013) centers on the St. Louis incident. ISBN 8-48-383755-2
- Nilo Cruz's play Sotto Voce (2014), explores the tragedy of the ship's passengers in the present
- The German Girl (2016), a novel by Armando Lucas Correa. ISBN 1-50-1121146
- Refugee (2017), a young adult novel by Alan Gratz. ISBN 0-54-588087-4
- Die Reise der Verlorenen, 2018 play by Daniel Kehlmann
- Die Ungewollten – Die Irrfahrt der St. Louis, 2019 TV film
- The Good Ship St. Louis, 2022 play by Philip Boehm
- The St. Louis Refugee Ship Blues, Art Spiegelman recounts a sad story 70 years later. by Art Spiegelman

== See also ==
- SS Navemar, designed for 28 passengers, which carried 1,120 Jewish refugees to New York in 1941
- MV Struma, a schooner chartered to carry Jewish refugees that was torpedoed and sunk by a Soviet submarine on 5 February 1942
- MV Mefküre, a schooner carrying Jewish refugees that was torpedoed and sunk by a Soviet submarine on 5 August 1944
- Komagata Maru, a merchant ship carrying Asian migrants that was denied entry to Canada in 1914
- SS Quanza, which carried over 300 refugees including at least 100 Jews to America and Mexico in 1940

== Sources ==
- Levine, Robert M. (1993). Tropical Diaspora: The Jewish Experience in Cuba. Gainesville: University Press of Florida. p. 103. ISBN 9781558765214.
- Miller, Scott; Sarah A. Ogilvie (2006). Refuge Denied: The St. Louis Passengers and the Holocaust. Madison: University of Wisconsin Press. ISBN 978-0-299-21980-2. OCLC 64592065.
- Rosen, Robert (2006). Saving the Jews: Franklin D. Roosevelt and the Holocaust. New York: Thunder's Mouth Press. ISBN 978-1-56025-778-3. OCLC 64664326.
- Whitaker, Reginald (1991). Canadian Immigration Policy. Ottawa: Canadian Historical Association. ISBN 0-88798-120-8.
