= Allies (novel) =

Historical fiction novel by Alan Gratz

- Author: Alan Gratz
- Language: English
- Genre: Historical Fiction
- Publisher: Scholastic Inc.
- Publication date: October 15, 2019
- Publication place: United States
- Pages: 336
- ISBN: 978-1-338-72673-2

Allies is a historical fiction novel by Alan Gratz, based on D-Day. It was published by Scholastic Inc. on October 15, 2019. Although Gratz has written several other historical fiction novels set in World War II, including Prisoner B-3087, Projekt 1065, Grenade, and Heroes, each stands alone.

== Plot ==
The story starts with a sixteen-year-old boy named Douglas "Dee" Carpenter and his friend Sid Jacobstein, who are soldiers traveling in a boat, preparing for the fight against the Nazis. Douglas Carpenter's real name is Dietrich Zimmerman, and he is secretly German.

At the same time, eleven-year-old Samira Zidane has her mother caught by the German guards and wants to save her because she lost her father to the Nazis and she does not want to lose her too. Samira then teams up with French forces to stop the Nazis until the American army attacks Normandy. Simultaneously, nineteen-year-old Lance Corporal James McKay and his friend Sam Tremblay are ready to jump off an airplane into the Nazi battlefield, knowing that they are going to die. While this is happening, Private Bill Richards is in his tank named Achilles on the battlefield, thinking this is going to be the greatest invasion of history. The German 88s shoot at Achilles, and Bill has to get out of his tank to dig a hole with his friend Thomas. The German 88 missed, and they all cheered that it missed. Elsewhere, Corporal Henry Allen, who is a medic, heals many injured soldiers during the battle. Meanwhile, Dee has been shot on the battlefield, and he was told not to fight anymore. Dee reunited with Sid, but he had gotten hurt in the leg. When the Germans attacked with a mortar, there was a mini-battle between them. Dee and Sid hid behind the hedgerows, but they had to free French towns from Nazi control. While staying close to the houses, one of the houses exploded from the other side of the street. The Germans had a Panzer and a forward-mounted machine gun firing bullets. While the Panzer is traveling, Dee overhears the Germans talking about taking revenge on the French for blowing up the supply depot last month. Sid saw a church boarded and burning with people inside. Dee told Sid what he had heard. Sid questioned Dee about how he understood the German soldiers speaking, and Dee said he was of German origin. Sid was filled with disgust at first, but he had no time to think, and Sid had shot the boards, and one of them cracked. There was a German sniper who tried to stop them from saving them by shooting the window. Sid told him to keep on going, and he moved, but Dee got shot in the shoulder and was now unconscious.

After the war is over, thirteen-year-old Monique Marchand wants to be a nurse and tries to help the remaining injured soldiers. While Monique is helping the soldiers, a reporter named Dorothy Powell helps Monique with helping the soldiers. When Dee finally regained consciousness, Monique and Dorothy carried him to the Bayeux Tapestry. When he turned around, he saw Sid in his bed. Dee was worried about who's going to stop the Nazis, but Sid reminded him that the entire free world united for the common good and that they were stronger together and allies.

== Reception ==
Julie Hanson of Seattle’s Child “found [Allies] a riveting read and a good introduction to World War II and D-Day. It did not gloss over the brutal realities of war, and particularly of the Allied invasion of Normandy. The storytelling includes many deaths, but I didn't find it gruesome or gratuitous."

John McMurtrie from The New York Times said "The book gives us far more than an assemblage of characters out of central casting. The figures whom Gratz paints surprise themselves with their acts of heroism, but they’re also full of doubt and fear. And they can be funny. They’re real people whom young readers will believe in and relate to.”

The School Library Journal's Kaetlyn Phillips said “A complex moment of history is deftly explored. Give to readers who enjoyed Refugee, Gratz’s other World War II novels, or Eric Walters’s Fly Boy.”
