= Enola Gay: The Men, the Mission, the Atomic Bomb =

- Genre: Adventure; Drama; History
- Based on: Enola Gay by Gordon Thomas & Max Morgan-Witts
- Written by: Millard Kaufman; James Poe
- Directed by: David Lowell Rich
- Starring: Kim Darby; Billy Crystal; Patrick Duffy
- Music by: Maurice Jarre
- Country of origin: United States
- Original language: English

Production
- Executive producers: Franklin R. Levy; Richard Reisberg; Mike Wise
- Producers: Ted Zachary; Stanley Kallis
- Cinematography: Robert L. Morrison
- Editor: Byron Chudnow
- Running time: 156 minutes
- Production company: Viacom Productions

Original release
- Network: NBC
- Release: November 23, 1980

Enola Gay: The Men, The Mission, The Atomic Bomb is a 1980 American made-for-television historical drama film about the B-29 mission by the 509th Composite Group, the Army Air Force unit that dropped the first atomic bomb to be used in combat on Hiroshima, Japan at the end of World War II.

It was based on a book by Gordon Thomas and Max Morgan-Witts.

== Cast ==
- Kim Darby as Lucy Tibbetts
- Billy Crystal as Lt. Jake Beser
- Patrick Duffy as Col. Paul Tibbetts
- Gary Frank as Maj. Tom Ferebee
- Gregory Harrison as Capt. Bob Lewis
- Richard Herd as General Leslie Groves
- Stephen Macht as William 'Bud' Uanna
- Bill Morey as General of the Army George C. Marshall
- Than Wyenn as Gen. Curtis LeMay
- Robert Pine as Capt. William "Deak" Parsons
- James Shigeta as Field Marshal Abehata
- Robert Walden as Robert Oppenheimer
- Ed Nelson as Pres. Harry S. Truman
- James Saito as Lt. Tatsuo Yamato
- Walter Olkewicz as Sgt. 'Shug' Crawford
