= Code of Honor =

Code of Honor may refer to:

- Code of honor, a set of rules or ideals or a mode or way of behaving regarding honor

== Arts and entertainment ==
- Code of Honor (1930 film), an American western
- Code of Honor, a 1987 film with Chow Yun-fat
- Code of Honor (2016 film), an American action thriller
- "Code of Honor" (Star Trek: The Next Generation), a TV episode
- Code of Honour, a Malaysian-Singaporean television drama series
- Code of Honor (Cameron novel), a 2019 Tom Clancy novel
- Code of Honor (Gratz novel), 2015

== Other uses ==
- Code of Honor (horse) (2016–2022), an American Thoroughbred horse

== See also ==
- Honor Code (horse), an American Thoroughbred horse
