= Gideon's Spies =

1999 book by Gordon Thomas

Gideon's Spies: The Secret History of the Mossad
- Author: Gordon Thomas (author)
- Genre: Intelligence
- Media type: Print
- Pages: 400
- ISBN: 0-312-25284-6

Gideon's Spies: The Secret History of the Mossad is a 1999 book by Welsh author Gordon Thomas on the Mossad, the Israeli intelligence service.

== Background ==
Two years before the publication of Gideon's Spies, Thomas wrote and narrated a major documentary for Channel Four – The Spy Machine – co-produced by Open Media and Israfilm. As Thomas's "Notes on Sources" afterword to Gideon's Spies makes clear, the research for the film provided him with some, but not all, of the sources and material he used when writing his later book independently of Channel 4 and the film-makers.

Sources for the book included former Israeli intelligence officer Ari Ben-Menashe and Israeli spy Rafi Eitan.

== Claims ==
Thomas claimed that – eight months before Kenneth Starr had ever heard of Monica Lewinsky – the Israelis had about thirty hours of intimate recordings between Lewinsky and President Bill Clinton. According to Thomas, Israel was keeping these tapes either for blackmail against the United States or to defend a purported mole in White House, whose code name was "Mega."

Thomas also claimed that the Mossad had a role in the deaths of Princess Diana, Robert Maxwell, William Buckley, and had forewarning for the 1983 Beirut barracks bombings.

== Reception ==
A spokesman for the Israeli Prime Minister dismissed Thomas's allegations as "unmitigated drivel." Daniel Pipes also criticized the book as inaccurate. According to Charles Foster in Contemporary Review: "Writers who know their place are few and far between: fortunately Mr Thomas is one of them. By keeping to his place as a tremendous storyteller without a preacher's pretensions, he has put his book amongst the important chronicles of the state of Israel."
