= Denmark, Tennessee =

- Unincorporated community
- Location within Tennessee Location within the United States
- Coordinates: 35°31′58″N 89°00′14″W
- Country: United States
- State: Tennessee
- County: Madison
- Elevation: 459 ft (140 m)
- Time zone: UTC-6 (Central (CST))
  - Summer (DST): UTC-5 (CDT)
- ZIP code: 38391
- Area code: 731
- GNIS feature ID: 1282335

Denmark is an unincorporated community and former city in Madison County, Tennessee, United States roughly 14 miles southwest of Jackson. The zip code is 38391. Although it was once a thriving farming community, a combination of man-made and natural disasters has reduced Denmark to a few remaining houses and the historic antebellum Denmark Presbyterian Church. Due to this, the Denmark municipality charter was revoked in 1983 and is now unincorporated.

== History ==
Denmark was one of the first-settled places in Madison County. The land on which it was incorporated in 1854 was opened by Thomas Sanders in 1822. Presbyterian and Methodist churches were established in the area in 1833 and 1842. By January 1844, the community had been sufficiently populated that the Tennessee General Assembly incorporated an academy for education of white boys. Prior to the Civil War, Denmark flourished and rivaled neighboring Jackson in size.

During the American Civil War, Union soldiers repulsed a Confederate raid near Denmark in the Battle of Britton's Lane in September 1862. Union troops occupied Tennessee from that year to the end of the war.

Following the Civil War, Denmark's economy experienced a pronounced decline because the town was bypassed by all of the railroads built through Madison County. Although its population was about 250 in 1886, Denmark's population declined dramatically in the following decades. On April 28, 1983, its municipal charter was revoked by a chancery court order after the Tennessee legislature passed a statute providing for the forfeiting of charters of any city with a population under 100.

The local high school, chartered in 1885, was merged into South Side High School in Jackson in 1992. The local middle school was disestablished, and its campus was developed for the West Tennessee Regional Training Center. Denmark Elementary is the community's only remaining school.

=== Destructive weather ===
Denmark has suffered repeated weather catastrophes that have contributed to the community's decline. A devastating tornado on October 14, 1909, accompanied by a thunderstorm and subsequent fires, inflicted immense damage. Another tornado, in 2003, was as destructive as the one nearly a century before.

== Climate ==
Denmark's climate is characterized by relatively high temperatures and evenly distributed precipitation throughout the year. According to the Köppen Climate Classification system, Denmark has a Humid subtropical climate, abbreviated "Cfa" on climate maps.

Climate data for Denmark, Tennessee
Month	Jan	Feb	Mar	Apr	May	Jun	Jul	Aug	Sep	Oct	Nov	Dec	Year
Mean daily maximum °C (°F)	9 (48)	12 (53)	17 (62)	22 (72)	27 (80)	31 (88)	33 (91)	32 (90)	29 (84)	23 (74)	16 (61)	11 (51)	22 (71)
Mean daily minimum °C (°F)	−2 (29)	0 (32)	4 (40)	9 (49)	14 (58)	19 (66)	21 (69)	20 (68)	16 (60)	9 (48)	4 (39)	0 (32)	9 (49)
Average precipitation mm (inches)	120 (4.6)	110 (4.3)	130 (5)	130 (5)	130 (5.3)	110 (4.3)	110 (4.4)	76 (3)	89 (3.5)	81 (3.2)	120 (4.7)	130 (5)	1,340 (52.6)
Source: Weatherbase

== Notable people ==
- Walt Bond, Negro league baseball player who later moved to the Major League Baseball Cleveland Indians
- John Murrell, a 19th-century horse and slave thief and noted outlaw of the Natchez Trace who had family who lived in Denmark during his imprisonment

== In popular culture ==
Two mystery novels take place in part in a fictional version of Denmark: Such Vicious Minds: A Murder Mystery Featuring Elvis Presley by Daniel Klein, and Something Rotten by Alan Gratz.
