= Erich Dublon =

Jewish-German Immigrant

Erich Dublon was a German-Jewish diarist from Erfurt, Germany, who lived during the rise of Nazi persecution. In 1939, he attempted to emigrate to Cuba with his brother Wilhelm Dublon, his sister-in-law Erna Dublon, and their two young daughters, Lore and Eva.

The Dublon family boarded the MS St. Louis, a German, diesel-powered, ocean liner bound for Cuba that carried hundreds of Jewish refugees fleeing persecution in Europe. After a sixteen-day transatlantic voyage, the ship reached Havana Harbor, where passengers were forced to remain on board while Cuban authorities debated whether to admit them. The refugees were ultimately denied entry into both Cuba and the United States.

Following the voyage, Dublon and his family were returned to Europe and settled in Antwerp, Belgium. After the Nazi occupation of Belgium and the intensification of extermination policies, the family was deported and murdered at the Auschwitz concentration camp.

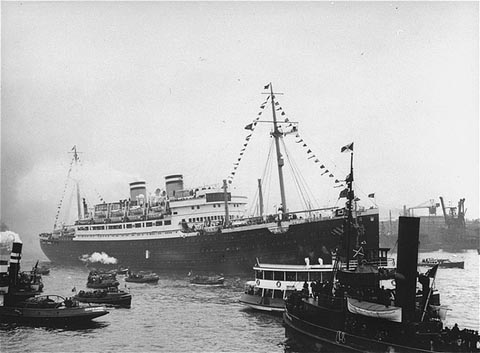
MS St. Louis

== Early life ==
Erich Dublon was born on November 6, 1890, in Apolda, Germany. As an adult, he lived in Erfurt, Germany, with his brother Willi Dublon, sister-in-law Erna, and their daughters. Erich and Willi co-owned a shoe store called Salamander Schuhe. The family remained in Erfurt during the 1930s, despite the increasingly repressive political climate following the rise of the Nazi regime.

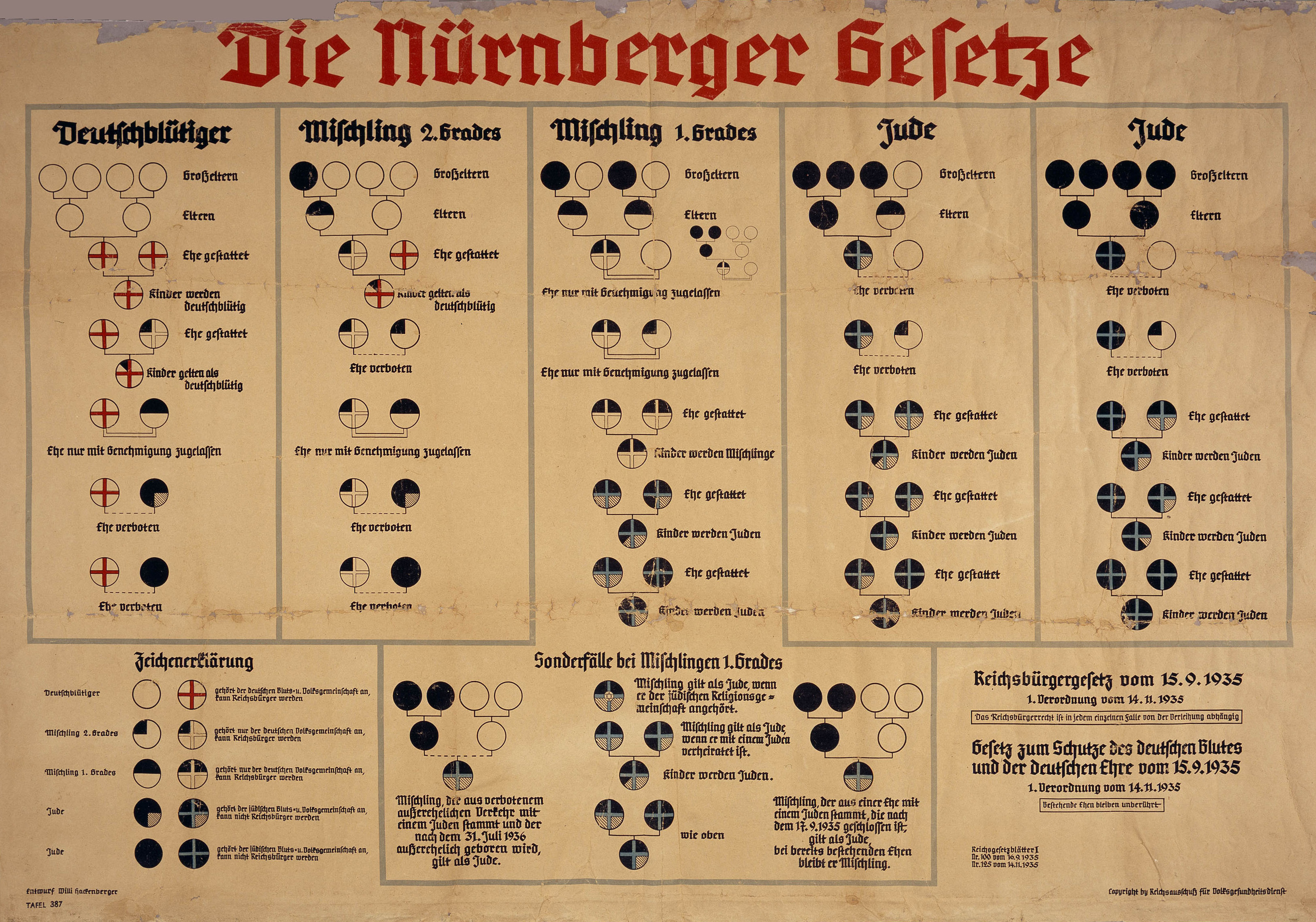
Chart illustrating racial classification under the Nuremberg Laws

== Nazi persecution ==
The aftermath of World War I created a volatile political, economic, and social climate in Germany. A severe financial crisis marked by hyperinflation, poverty, and mass unemployment contributed to the rise of Adolf Hitler and the Nazi regime, which promoted fascist and antisemitic policies.

After the Third Reich came to power, the government imposed economic restrictions aimed at excluding Jews from German society. The Nuremberg Laws, enacted in September 1935, introduced a legal framework that distinguished between Germans and Jews. These laws stripped Jews of German citizenship and institutionalized systemic discrimination and persecution.

Initially, the Dublon family chose to remain in Erfurt, hoping the wave of antisemitism would subside. However, following the Kristallnacht pogroms and additional restrictions targeting Jewish economic life, the family concluded that remaining in Germany was no longer possible.

== Immigration policies ==
Willi Dublon secured passage on the MS St. Louis for himself, his wife Erna, their daughters Lore (aged twelve) and Eva (aged six), and his brother Erich. The ship’s passengers were predominantly Jewish refugees seeking to escape Nazi persecution. Permits for temporary stay in Cuba were issued by the country's Director of Immigration, Manuel Benítez González. However, González was later revealed to have acted corruptly, and the visas were never formally approved by the Cuban government. The Dublon family planned to remain in Cuba until they could obtain permission to enter the United States.

Following World War I, the United States had restricted immigration through the Immigration Act of 1924, which imposed strict quotas on the number of foreigners admitted. In the wake of the Great Depression, public opposition to immigration grew, fueled by fears that foreign workers would compete for scarce jobs. Suspicion was also directed at immigrants from countries considered hostile, and quotas for regions with large Jewish populations were set especially low, creating significant barriers for Jews attempting to emigrate.

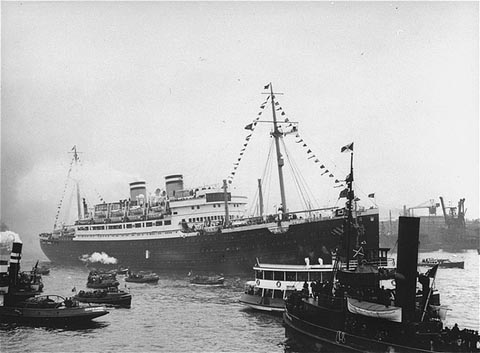
MS St. Louis in Havana Harbor

== MS St. Louis ==
The MS St. Louis departed for Cuba on May 13, 1939. A detailed record of Erich Dublon's experience on the voyage survives through a travel diary later recovered by a family friend, Peter Heiman, who successfully emigrated from Erfurt to the United States.

Dublon's diary described the initially optimistic atmosphere on board. The ship's comfortable accommodations, quality food, and recreational activities created a sense of hope among the passengers, including the Dublon family, who looked forward to beginning a new life. He also noted a sense of solidarity as the family reconnected with other emigrants from Erfurt. After sixteen days at sea, the St. Louis arrived in Havana, Cuba.

The ship remained in Havana Harbor while negotiations took place between Cuban authorities and ship representatives regarding the passengers' visas, many of which had been improperly issued. The American Jewish Joint Distribution Committee attempted to secure asylum for the refugees in either Cuba or the United States, but these efforts were unsuccessful. According to Dublon's diary, confusion and anxiety spread among the passengers as the days passed, and some were unaware that their visas were invalid. By the fifth day of waiting, he recorded accounts of passengers who had died by suicide. On the seventh day, an announcement was made that entry into Cuba had been denied.

The St. Louis was escorted out of the harbor by Cuban police boats, with threats of force if it resisted departure. The ship then sailed toward Florida in the hope of landing there but was again refused entry. On June 10, 1939, the passengers were informed that the ship had no alternative but to return to Europe. Dublon's diary entries convey the despair of the passengers upon receiving the news, noting widespread grief and distress on board.

== Return to Europe ==
Jewish refugees aboard the SS St. Louis

Following the ship's rejection in Cuba and the United States, Great Britain, the Netherlands, France, and Belgium agreed to provide temporary refuge to the passengers. The Dublon family was assigned to Belgium, and the St. Louis arrived in Antwerp on June 17, 1939.

In Antwerp, Lore and Eva Dublon faced challenges adapting to their new environment, particularly with the language barrier at school. Despite these difficulties, the family remained close-knit. They took weekly walks together and gradually adjusted to life in Belgium.

== Deportation ==
Belgium remained neutral at the outbreak of World War II, when the Dublon family first arrived in 1939. In May 1940, however, German forces occupied the country. The occupation authorities soon implemented anti-Jewish measures, including a census to identify the Jewish population.

At the age of 50, Erich Dublon was deported to the Mechelen transit camp and later transported to the Auschwitz complex. He was not sent directly to the gas chambers but was instead selected for forced labor. Auschwitz records state that he died of a heart attack on September 3, 1942.

His brother Willi was arrested by the Gestapo and sent to the Mechelen camp on December 23, 1943. Erna Dublon and her daughters, Lore and Eva, were also captured on January 8, 1944. The family was deported to Auschwitz on January 17, 1944. Upon arrival, Willi (aged 54), Erna (aged 40), and Eva (aged 10) were killed in the gas chambers. Lore, aged 16, was selected for forced labor and transferred to the Golleschau subcamp, where she later died.

== Legacy ==
Erich Dublon's travel diary provides a detailed account of the voyage of the MS St. Louis. It documents the daily lives of the passengers and records their emotional distress when entry into Havana was denied. The diary has contributed to the historical understanding of Jewish migration during World War II and the experiences of the MS St. Louis passengers.
