= Denmark Presbyterian Church =

Historic church in Tennessee, United States

- U.S. National Register of Historic Places
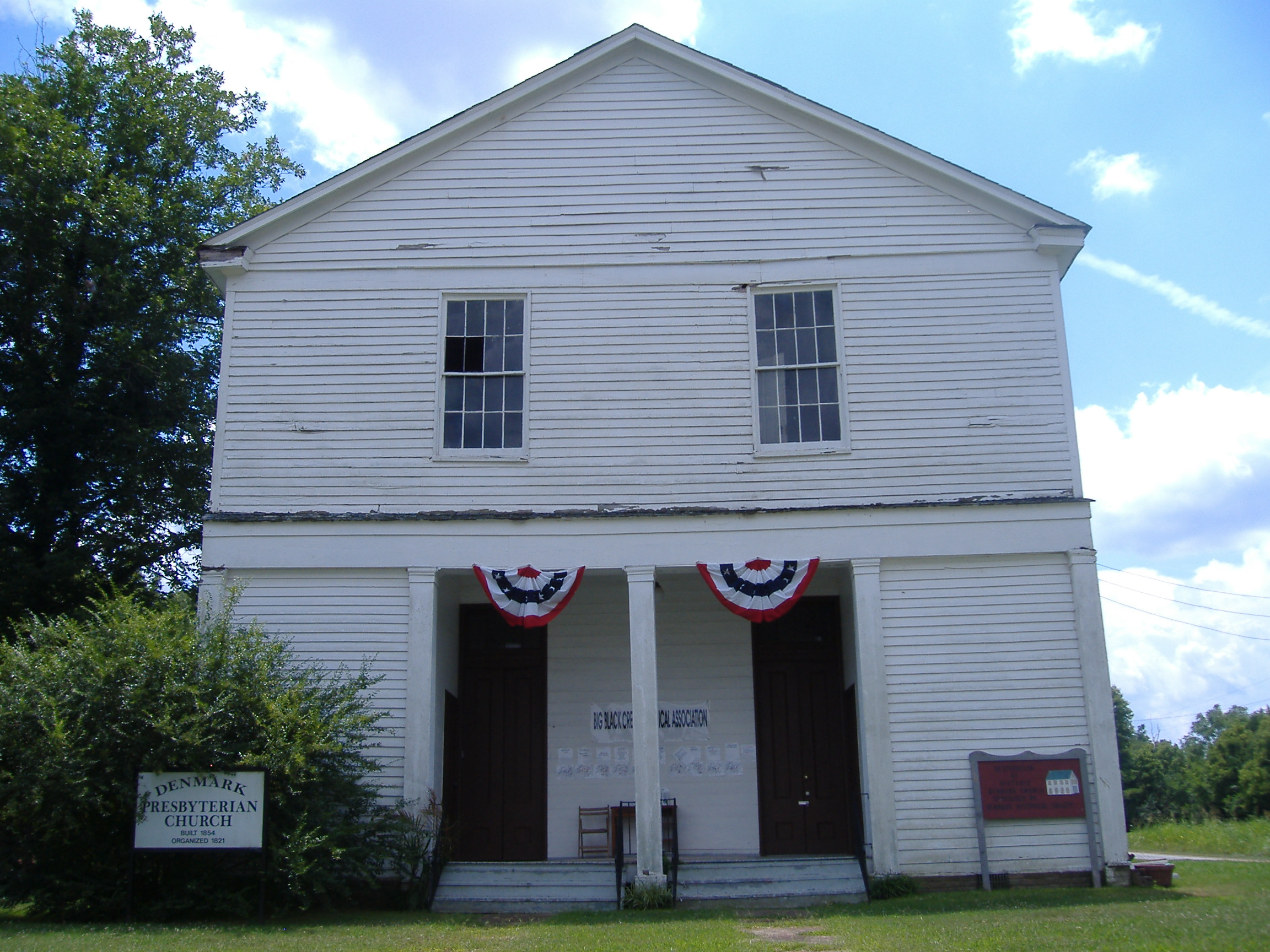
- Facade of Denmark Presbyterian Church in 2014

- Location within Tennessee Location within the United States
- Location: Jackson-Denmark Rd., Denmark, Tennessee
- Coordinates: 35°31′56″N 89°0′1″W
- Area: 1.8 acres (0.73 ha)
- Built: 1854
- Architect: Snipe Brothers; Slavic labor
- Architectural style: Greek Revival
- NRHP reference No.: 83003048
- Added to NRHP: June 16, 1983

Denmark Presbyterian Church (The Denmark Church) is a historic church on Jackson-Denmark Road in Denmark, Tennessee.

It is a two-story gable-front frame building with Greek Revival architectural elements. It was added to the National Register of Historic Places in 1983 as an example of the Greek Revival style.
