= David Butler (screenwriter) =

British screenwriter (1927–2006)

- Born: David Dalrymple Butler; 12 November 1927; Larkhall, Lanarkshire, Scotland, United Kingdom
- Died: 27 May 2006 (aged 78); London, England, United Kingdom
- Resting place: Highgate Cemetery
- Occupations: Director; producer; screenwriter; Member of the Academy of Motion Picture Arts and Sciences (Writers Branch)
- Years active: 1961–1992
- Spouse(s): Norma Ronald (1959–1966; divorced); Mary McPhail (1969–2006; his death)
- Children: Two daughters

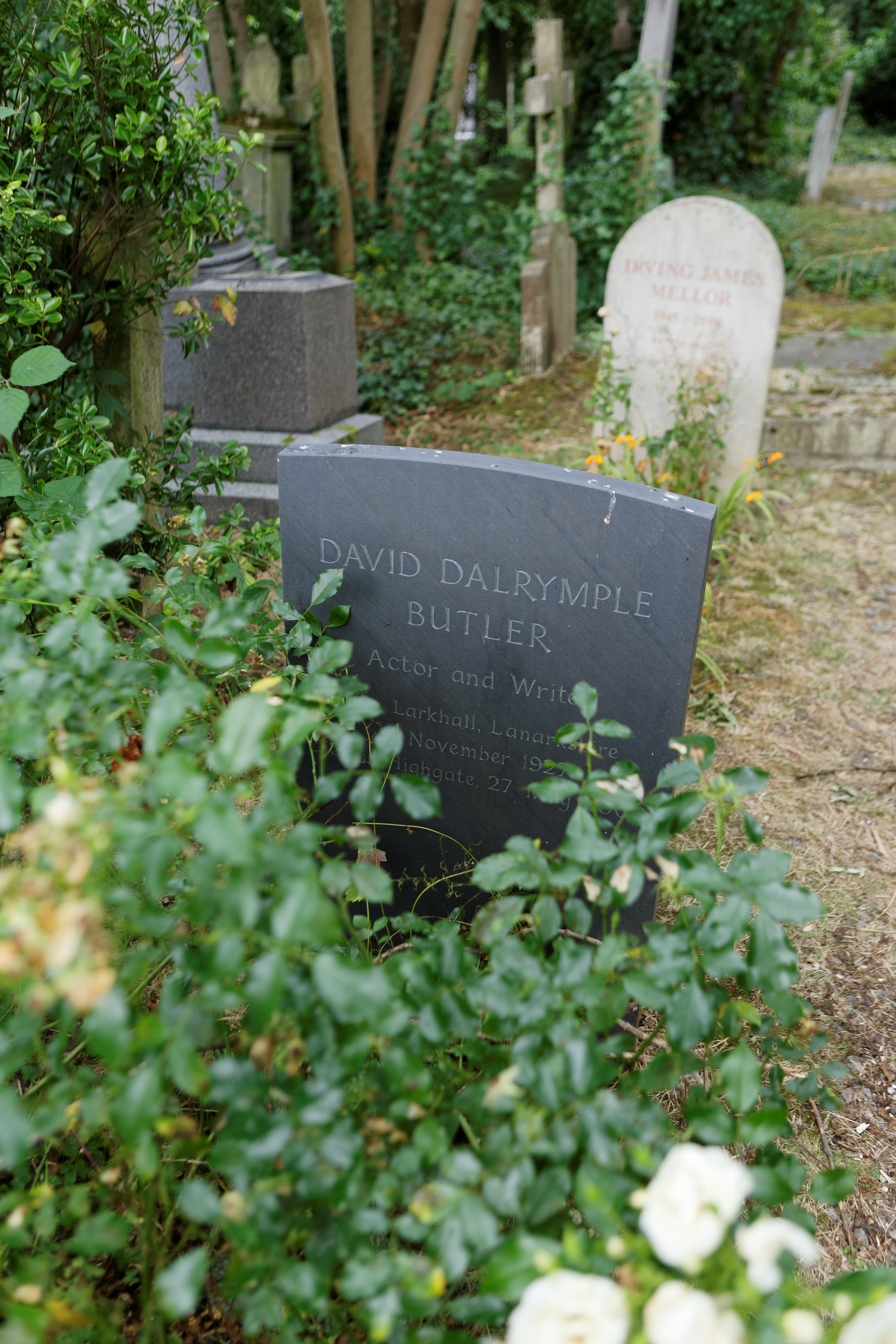
The grave of David Dalrymple Butler, Highgate Cemetery, London

David Dalrymple Butler (12 November 1927 – 27 May 2006) was a Scottish writer of numerous screenplays and teleplays who won a Primetime Emmy Award and was nominated for an Academy Award and a Golden Globe Award.

He specialized in period-piece drama and is particularly remembered for a string of hit British television shows, including Within These Walls, Lillie, We'll Meet Again and Edward the Seventh, as well as for his acting, most specifically as Dr. Nick Williams on British television's first medical soap opera, Emergency – Ward 10 in 1960–62.

== Early years ==
A native of the town of Larkhall in South Lanarkshire, Butler was born into a well-educated family, with his parents working as teachers. At the age of 18, as World War II came to an end, he enrolled at the University of St Andrews, but ultimately abandoned his studies before attaining a degree, upon becoming interested in acting with the university drama society. He subsequently trained at the Royal Academy of Dramatic Art and began his performing career in West End revues. David completed his national service with the Royal Air Force during the Korean War, initially training as a pilot officer. Due to his poor eyesight, he ended up being posted to Singapore where he led jungle patrols against terrorists in Malaya in 1953. In 1956, at the age of 29, he played a prison officer in Joan Littlewood's Theatre Workshop production of Brendan Behan's The Quare Fellow.

== Career highlights ==
In 1959, he married actress Norma Ronald and, by the early 1960s, was supplementing his acting career with scriptwriting. Following a 1966 divorce, his 1969 marriage to Mary McPhail lasted for the remainder of his life and produced two daughters.

By 1971, he had mostly given up acting and began to devote all of his energies to turning out teleplays. One of his first successes in the historical genre was 1972's The Strauss Family followed by many other productions, including The Duchess of Duke Street in 1976–77, 1978's Disraeli, starring Ian McShane and his 1986 Primetime Emmy Award-winning Lord Mountbatten: The Last Viceroy with Nicol Williamson in the title role.

Circumstances also permitted an occasional return to acting, as in his own teleplays of the 1974–78 prison television series Within These Walls, in some episodes of which he played the penal institution chaplain, Rev. Henry Prentice. During this time, he was nominated for an Academy Award for his historical screenplay of 1976's Voyage of the Damned, depicting the 1939 attempt by 937 Jews to escape the looming Holocaust via a ship traveling from Hitler's Germany to Havana, but denied permission to disembark in Cuba or in the United States.

== Death ==
Butler died in London at the age of 78.

He is buried in the section of modern graves in the north-east quadrant of the eastern half of Highgate Cemetery in north London.

== Awards and nominations ==
- Academy Award nomination for Best Writing, Screenplay Based on Material from Another Medium for: Voyage of the Damned (1976)
- Golden Globe nomination for Best Screenplay – Motion Picture for: Voyage of the Damned (1976)
- Winner – Primetime Emmy Award for Outstanding Writing for a Miniseries, Movie or a Dramatic Special for Lord Mountbatten: The Last Viceroy (1986)
