= MS Milwaukee (1929) =

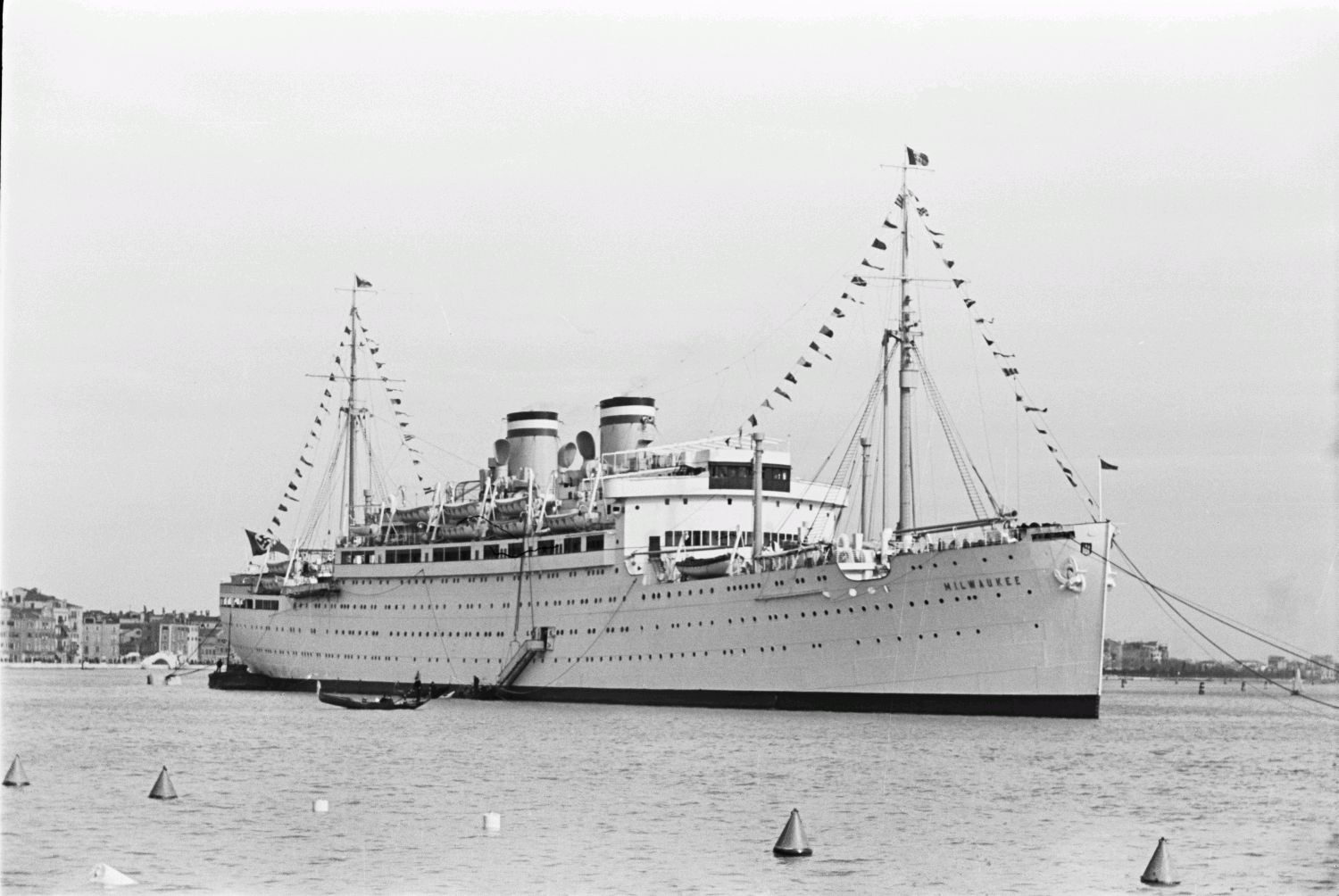
- MS Milwaukee on a cruise to Italy, 1937-39.

History

Germany
- Name: Milwaukee
- Owner: Hamburg-America Line
- Operator: Hamburg-America Line; Kriegsmarine
- Port of registry: Hamburg
- Launched: 20 February 1929
- Maiden voyage: 28 March 1929
- Fate: Given to British government in 1945
- Notes: Sister ship to MS St. Louis

United Kingdom
- Name: Empire Waveney
- Acquired: 1945
- In service: 1945
- Out of service: June 1947
- Fate: Scrapped in 1947

General characteristics
- Type: Passenger liner
- Tonnage: 16,699 gross register tons (GRT)
- Length: 575.85 ft (175.52 m)
- Beam: 72.44 ft (22.08 m)
- Propulsion: 4 double acting MAN, six-cylinder two-stroke diesel engines
- Speed: 16 knots (30 km/h; 18 mph)
- Capacity: 703 passengers

MS Milwaukee was a German diesel-powered, passenger ship built by Blohm & Voss and launched in February 1929 for the Hamburg-America Line. She was used on the transatlantic service from Hamburg to New York and made cruises to the Canary Islands, Madeira and Spain sharing the same route as her sister ship MS St. Louis. During the Second World War the ship was used as a barracks ship by the Kriegsmarine. In 1945, the ship was handed to the British government under the name Empire Waveney and was used to carry troops. On 1 March 1946, she was badly damaged by fire at dock in Liverpool, St. Louis served with Hamburg America Line until she was given to the British government in 1945 and renamed.

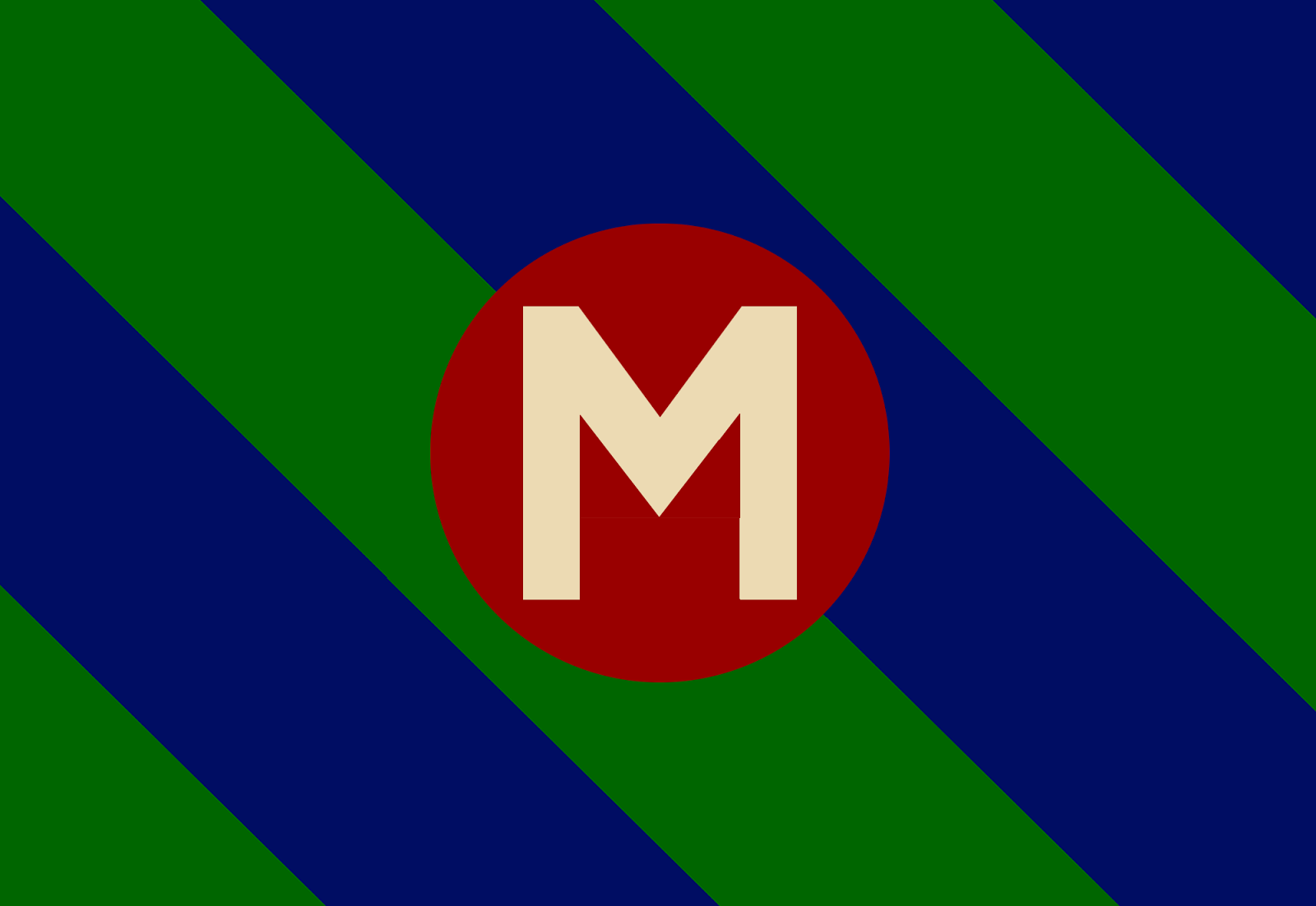
The flag of Milwaukee, Wisconsin in 1928, designed for the MS Milwaukee ceremony in the same year.

She was scrapped in Scotland in 1947.
