= Ban This Book =

2017 children's novel by Alan Gratz

- Author: Alan Gratz
- Language: English
- Genre: Children's fiction
- Published: August 29, 2017
- Publisher: Tor/Starscape
- Publication place: United States
- Pages: 256
- ISBN: 978-0-7653-8556-7

Ban This Book is a 2017 children's novel by Alan Gratz. Inspired by a viral Internet story from the mid-2010s, it tells of an African-American North Carolina girl student's fight against book censorship. Published in 2017 to positive reviews, it became the subject of its own May 2024 ban in a Florida school district.

== Synopsis ==
Amy Anne Ollinger, a fourth-grade African-American North Carolina student, visits her school library to borrow her favorite book, From the Mixed-Up Files of Mrs. Basil E. Frankweiler, a novel by E. L. Konigsburg. The librarian, Mrs. Jones, tells her she cannot because the school's PTA president banned it at the behest of a classmate's parent. In response to the ban and similar others, she creates the "Banned Books Locker Library", but its discovery leads to her suspension and the firing of Mrs. Jones. The incident inspires Ollinger and fellow students—including the PTA president's son—to crusade against book censorship. Dav Pilkey also makes an in-story cameo.

== Development ==
A viral Internet tale of a Catholic high-school girl who ran a library of banned books from her locker inspired the storyline of Ban This Book. Although the story was later revealed to be a hoax, Alan Gratz kept the idea around and worked on the story for several years.

== Reception ==
Ban This Book received positive reviews upon its original August 2017 publication; Booklist's Jennifer Barnes and School Library Journal contributor Laurie Slagenwhite Walters recommended it for middle-grade collections. Barnes called it "[an] inspiring story about 'good trouble' that's worth the consequences." Publishers Weekly said that "Gratz delivers a book lover's book that speaks volumes about kids' power to effect change at a grassroots level." The staff at Kirkus Reviews noted the references to real library-challenged titles, and found it "Contrived at some points, polemic at others, but a stout defense of the right to read." The School Library Journal staff later included it in a 2022 list of titles revolving around book censorship.

== Censorship ==
In May 2024, the school district of Florida's Indian River County banned the book in a 3–2 vote after a challenge from a member of the conservative group Moms for Liberty, a move Gratz had anticipated in 2017; their vote "overrul[ed] its own district book-review committee's decision to keep it." The challenger—who had previously made similar filings for at least 140 other titles in its library—accused the book for supposed sexual content, while a district board member called it "a liberal Marxist propaganda piece"; both points were dismissed by Gratz and other district personnel. Gratz told the Tallahassee Democrat the following month that the same themes discussed in the story led to its ban, which he felt was "incredibly ironic". "It feels like they know exactly what they're doing and they're somewhat ashamed of what they're doing," he said, "and they don't want a book on the shelves that calls them out." He also commented on similar recent efforts to remove material containing LGBTQIA+ themes and people of color.

== See also ==
- Book censorship in the United States
