= Within These Walls =

British television series (1974–1978)

- Genre: Drama
- Created by: David Butler
- Directed by: John Reardon; Peter Moffatt; Paul Annett; Tony Wharmby; Jim Goddard; Christopher Hodson; Bill Bain; Philip Casson
- Starring: Googie Withers; Jerome Willis; Denys Hawthorne; Beth Harris; Mona Bruce; Sonia Graham; Joan Benham; Janet Lees Price
- Theme music composer: Denis King
- Country of origin: United Kingdom
- Original language: English
- No. of series: 5
- No. of episodes: 72 (1 missing)

Production
- Executive producer: Rex Firkin
- Producer: Jack Williams
- Production locations: London, England
- Running time: 52 minutes
- Production company: London Weekend

Original release
- Network: ITV
- Release: 4 January 1974 – 15 April 1978

Within These Walls is a British television drama programme made by London Weekend Television for ITV and shown between 1974 and 1978. It portrayed life in HMP Stone Park, a fictional women's prison. Unlike later women-in-prison TV series, Bad Girls (ITV, 1999–2006), and Australian series, Prisoner (aka Prisoner: Cell Block H, Grundy Organisation, original run: 1979–1986), and Wentworth (2013–2021), Within These Walls tended to centre its story-lines around the prison staff rather than the inmates.

The lead character was played by British film actor Googie Withers who played the well-groomed, genteel governor Faye Boswell and episodes revolved around her attempts to liberalise the prison regime while managing her personal life at home.

Another prominent character was her Chief Officer, Mrs. Armitage (Mona Bruce).

Googie Withers left after three series; in Series Four her character was replaced as governor by Helen Forrester (Katherine Blake), who in turn left to be replaced in the final Series Five by Susan Marshall (Sarah Lawson).

Creator and screenwriter of the programme, David Butler, appeared in some episodes as prison chaplain, Rev. Henry Prentice.

== DVD release ==
As of November 2011, Network have released all five series on DVD in the UK, with the exception of "Nowhere for the Kids", an episode from Series Two which appears to be missing from the archives.

== Screening ==
The programme was broadcast around 9:00 p.m. (although exact times varied around the ITV regions), but prisoners were locked in their cells 30 minutes before 9:00pm.

== Cast ==
- Googie Withers as Prison Governor - Faye Boswell
- Katherine Blake as Prison Governor - Helen Forrester
- Sarah Lawson as Prison Governor - Sarah Marshall
- Mona Bruce as Chief Officer Mrs. Armitage
- Jerome Willis as Prison Deputy Governor Charles Radley
- Denys Hawthorne as Dr. Peter Mayes
- Beth Harris as Miss Clarke
- Elaine Wells as Principal Prison Officer Spencer
- Sonia Graham as Assistant Governor Martha Parrish
- Miranda Forbes as Prison Officer Parsons
- Janet Lees Price as Assistant Governor Janet Harker

Successful alumnae from the series included Helen Worth, later widely known for her role of Gail Platt on Coronation Street. Worth appeared in an episode of season 1 alongside Cheryl Murray. The two would be reunited as flatmates in Coronation Street in 1977, when Murray joined the cast as Suzie Birchall. Shirley Cheriton and Anna Wing both appeared in the season 2 episode "Skivers", long before becoming original cast members of EastEnders together.

== Episodes ==
=== Series overview ===
Series	Episodes	Originally released	
Series	Episodes	First released	Last released
1	13	4 January 1974	29 March 1974
2	13	10 January 1975	11 April 1975
3	16	6 September 1975	20 December 1975
4	17	4 September 1976	24 December 1976
5	13	21 January 1978	15 April 1978

=== Series 1 (1974) ===
No. overall	No. in series	Title	Directed by	Written by	Original release date
1	1	"Cause for Concern"	John Reardon	David Butler	4 January 1974
Governor Faye Boswell has been in charge at Stone Park women's prison for one month when a prisoner on remand, Martha Kyle, starts to spread stories in the newspaper about her mistreatment by prison officers. As it turns out, Martha is a political activist who is taking any opportunity she can to gain publicity. Meanwhile, another prisoner, Peggy Abbot, screams whenever she's near prison officers, afraid they might beat her just for being black. Is this simply her misconception of the prison system, or is there more to it?
2	2	"Lesson Number One"	Peter Moffatt	David Butler	11 January 1974
Peggy Abbot is put to work in the prison's nursery to help her cope with her children when she gets out. Initially, things go well until Peggy starts to show signs of slipping back into her old bad habits. Elsewhere, worry arises over the friendship between Lily, a domineering prison veteran, and Nora, a simple-minded first offender. Meanwhile, Faye has to decide how to spend new funding for improvements within the prison itself.
3	3	"The Walls Came Tumbling Down"	Paul Annett	David Butler	18 January 1974
Construction has begun in Stone Park on filling in the floors of the upper wings to give the prisoners more space. Trouble first starts over the issue of the crowded temporary conditions. Then, the work starts to slow down; it seems that the laborers, male prisoners from another institution, are in no hurry to leave. Meanwhile, Faye's son, Paul, brings a girl home with him, Sally, whose views on the prison system clash with Faye's. A few days later, when a prisoner brought to Stone Park on remand for drug offenses asks to see the governor, Faye is surprised to discover the prisoner is Sally.
4	4	"In Her Own Right"	Tony Wharmby	Adele Rose	25 January 1974
Stone Park's Deputy Governor, Charles Radley, deals with a prisoner who threatens suicide.
5	5	"Prisoner by Marriage"	Paul Annett	Tony Hoare	1 February 1974
Jane Brogan is transferred to Stone Park so that she can be near her husband and children. However, Jane wants out and intends to use her husband anyway she can to achieve this goal. Meanwhile, a 16-year-old borstal escapee is sent to Stone Park to await trial. Doctor Mayes is incensed by the girl's treatment by the system, which he feels has failed her. He tries to help her, but her distrust of authority figures threatens to hinder his attempts.
6	6	"The Group"	Jim Goddard	Terence Feely	8 February 1974
Stone Park's drugs unit is one of Faye's main concerns, believing there must be a better way of treating drug addicts than imprisoning them and doping them up with legal substitutes. Dr. Mayes introduces Faye to a friend of his, Dr. Ormonde, who has tried to deal with drug addiction by using group therapy to a degree of success. Though the prison staff expresses concern because the addicts must be kept off all drugs for the therapy to work, Faye allows Dr. Mayes to set up a group. Things go reasonably well until Magda (Cheryl Hall), a hardcore addict, starts to cause trouble.
7	7	"One Step Forward, Two Steps Back"	Tony Wharmby	Tony Parker	15 February 1974
Marilyn Hunter has been in mental hospitals since being convicted of murdering two babies left in her care 12 years earlier. Now, having been given a clean bill of health, she has been transferred to Stone Park. Faye persuades the authorities to allow her to transfer Marilyn without a guard, but her idea of stopping for tea on the way back could cost Faye her job. Meanwhile, prisoner Joan Harrison is due to be moved to a semi-open prison within days. However, Joan doesn't want to leave Stone Park; in particular, she doesn't want to leave Martha Parrish behind.
8	8	"Failing to Report"	Christopher Hodson	Rosemary Anne Sisson	22 February 1974
After attending a conference as a representative of Stone Park, Charles Radley receives a summons to court over a motoring incident in which he was involved. Charles decides against telling Faye about the incident, but then the papers get hold of the story. Meanwhile, Claire Staines, a usually passive, if distant prisoner, begins to show signs of descent for no good reason.
9	9	"Tea on St. Pancras Station"	Paul Annett	Susan Pleat	1 March 1974
Shirley, a prisoner with mental problems who has previously passed through other institutions run by Faye, is due for release from Stone Park. With professionals dismissing Shirley as a hopeless case, Faye begins to worry about what will become of her once she's on the outside. Faye resolves to help Shirley and make sure that she doesn't end up in prison again.
10	10	"Guessing Game"	Bill Bain	Peter J. Hammond	8 March 1974
Faye has to put up with George, an ex-magistrate (and old friend) who has unique thoughts regarding the adaptability of women in prison.
11	11	"When the Bough Breaks"	Christopher Hodson	Felicity Douglas	15 March 1974
The sentencing of a baby-snatcher creates tension between the prisoners and the staff.
12	12	"Labour of Love"	Paul Annett	Peter Wildeblood	22 March 1974
A problem arises for Faye when a prisoner begins making paperweights.
13	13	"A Sense of Duty"	Bill Bain	David Butler	29 March 1974
The staff of Stone Park disapproves of the sentencing of a prisoner who poisoned her dying father.

=== Series 2 (1975) ===
No. overall	No. in series	Title	Directed by	Written by	Original release date
14	1	"When the Door Opens"	Philip Casson	David Butler	10 January 1975
An old enemy awaits a prisoner who leaves solitary confinement.
15	2	"Remand Wing"	Paul Annett	Susan Pleat	17 January 1975
An elderly prisoner causes problems in the remand wing.
16	3	"Nowhere for the Kids"	Richard Doubleday	Adele Rose	24 January 1975
Missing Episode
17	4	"The Slap"	Malcolm Taylor	Kathleen J. Smith	31 January 1975
A child-murderer faces a very cold reception from both the inmates and the guards of Stone Park prison.
18	5	"Playground"	John Reardon	P.J. Hammond	7 February 1975
A woman sentenced for child neglect perplexes all when she continues to disown the child.
19	6	"The Truth Game"	Jim Goddard	Rosemary Anne Sisson	14 February 1975
The two new prison officers who join the staff seem to display very different attitudes about their jobs.
20	7	"Debate"	Tony Wharmby	Tony Parker	21 February 1975
The Governor and her staff must find a way to deal with a constant troublemaker.
21	8	"Protest"	Brian Izzard	Tony Hoare	28 February 1975
The death of a prisoner leads inmate Kane to organize a protest about the COD verdict.
22	9	"Let the People See"	Philip Casson	Peter Wildeblood	7 March 1975
As bad publicity continues to rise, Governor Boswell invites a film crew to make a Stone Park documentary.
23	10	"Skivers"	Bryan Izzard	David Butler	14 March 1975
Dr. Mayes discovers that an inmate has a serious condition after investigating her acute indigestion.
24	11	"Coming Home"	Philip Casson	Terence Feely	21 March 1975
Boswell and Radley have a disagreement about her radical plan in confronting Stone Park's drug issues.
25	12	"The Good Life"	James Ormerod	Victor Pemberton	4 April 1975
An upper class woman on a murder charge arrives at Stone Park.
26	13	"For Life"	Philip Casson	David Butler	11 April 1975

=== Series 3 (1975) ===
No. overall	No. in series	Title	Directed by	Written by	Original release date
27	1	"To Reason Why"	Philip Casson	David Butler	6 September 1975
Governor Boswell's resolve is tested as more unrest plagues Stone Park.
28	2	"Prison Cat"	Paddy Russell	Kathleen J. Smith	13 September 1975
29	3	"Deception"	Philip Casson	Tony Hoare	20 September 1975
Officer White becomes involved with a young inmate.
30	4	"Babyface"	Malcolm Taylor	David Butler	27 September 1975
Governor Boswell searches for a way to stop the campaign of violence that is continuing at Stone Park.
31	5	"Long Shadows"	Derrick Goodwin	Stuart Douglass	4 October 1975
32	6	"The Keys"	John Reardon	Susan Pleat	11 October 1975
The inmates at Stone Park find themselves the target of Officer Pinner's personal misfortunes.
33	7	"A Lurking Doubt"	Mike Gibbon	Felicity Douglas	18 October 1975
An inmate convinces Governor Boswell that she is innocent of her crime.
34	8	"Mother's Girl"	John Gorrie	Terence Feely	25 October 1975
Stone Park's latest problem is a prisoner guilty of fraud and smuggling.
35	9	"A Free Woman"	John Gorrie	Julia Jones	1 November 1975
Stone Park receives an inmate who was intentionally caught shoplifting as a way to escape her husband.
36	10	"Getting Out"	Bill Bain	David Butler	8 November 1975
Problems abound when an inmate arrives who can't speak English and the only option is to let another prisoner act as interpreter.
37	11	"Windows"	Christopher Hodson	P.J. Hammond	15 November 1975
38	12	"Get the Glory Down"	Bryan Izzard	Peter Wildeblood	22 November 1975
Prisoner Baines starts to believe she has special powers after her curse on a fellow inmate has surprising results.
39	13	"My Dad was Called Charlie"	Bryan Izzard	Adele Rose	29 November 1975
40	14	"Inside Out"	Mike Gibbon	Mona Bruce and Robert James	6 December 1975
A petty theft inmate asks for an abortion from Dr. Mayes.
41	15	"The Animals Went in Two By Two"	Tony Wharmby	Susan Pleat	13 December 1975
A nurse serving time for murder becomes emotionally attached to a pair of inmates.
42	16	"On the Second Day of Christmas"	Bill Bain	David Butler	20 December 1975
During the Christmas show, a prisoner escapes. The last episode with Mrs Boswell as Governor.

=== Series 4 (1976) ===
No. overall	No. in series	Title	Directed by	Written by	Original release date
43	1	"Catalyst"	Christopher Hodson	David Butler	4 September 1976
Helen Forrester is appointed as the new governor of Stone Park, and quickly finds herself tested with the discipline of the inmates.
44	2	"The Man With the Magic Touch"	Christopher Hodson	Terence Feely	11 September 1976
Governor Forrester is concerned with the privileges extended to inmates undergoing treatment for drug addiction.
45	3	"The Complaint"	Paul Annett	Tony Hoare	18 September 1976
Mavis Smith accuses Officer Spencer of theft after her cell is ransacked.
46	4	"The Line of Duty"	Paddy Russell	David Butler	25 September 1976
The prison officers take another look at the rules after being reprimanded by Governor Forrester.
47	5	"K Block"	Bryan Izzard	David Butler	2 October 1976
48	6	"A Way of Loving"	John Gorrie	John Gorrie	9 October 1976
The prison chef kills himself when rejected by one of the prisoner's he has become obsessed with.
49	7	"Love and the Chaplain"	Paddy Russell	Kathleen J. Smith	16 October 1976
50	8	"The Mystery"	Bryan Izzard	Tony Hoare	23 October 1976
A new prisoner refuses to speak about her family and takes a strange interest in a child-murderer.
51	9	"A Sentence of Death"	Bryan Izzard	Peter Wildeblood	30 October 1976
A gypsy, convicted of contempt of court, finds that being locked up is difficult after her lifetime in the open.
52	10	"Vacuum"	Paul Annett	P.J. Hammond	6 November 1976
Mr. Radley proposes special treatment for a new prisoner who refuses to speak.
53	11	"On Trial"	Marek Kanievska	Susan Pleat	13 November 1976
54	12	"Visitors"	Peter Moffatt	Terence Feely	20 November 1976
The Governor expresses concern about Radley's proposal to try a new visitation system.
55	13	"Transfer"	Christopher Hodson	Tony Parker	27 November 1976
A mystery appears when a transfer from Rugely Prison arrives with an incomplete file.
56	14	"Someone's Got to Do It"	Mike Gibbon	Mona Bruce and Robert James	4 December 1976
Mrs. Armitage confronts the Governor about the continual problem of violence among the prisoners.
57	15	"Islands in the Heartline"	Marek Kanievska	Susan Pleat	11 December 1976
Miss Clarke helps Sarah after she becomes obsessed with Dr. Mayes.
58	16	"Invasion of Privacy"	Bill Bain	David Butler	18 December 1976
Mrs. Weeks, an elderly alcoholic, is back at Stone Park; The Governor's sister pays a visit.
59	17	"Silent Night"	Phillip Casson	David Butler	24 December 1976
Stone Park does its best to celebrate Christmas.

=== Series 5 (1978) ===
No. overall	No. in series	Title	Directed by	Written by	Original release date
60	1	"Mixer"	Christopher Hodson	David Butler	21 January 1978
61	2	"Arrivals, Departures"	Paul Annett	David Butler	28 January 1978
62	3	""Raft""	Christphoer Hodson	P.J. Hammond	4 February 1978
63	4	"Public Opinion"	Marek Kanievska	Mona Bruce and Robert James	11 February 1978
64	5	"Sisters"	John Gorrie	John Gorrie	18 February 1978
65	6	"Love Me, Love My Bear"	Bryan Izzard	Terence Feely	25 February 1978
66	7	"The Inquest"	Bryan Izzard	Tony Hoare	4 March 1978
67	8	"The Governor"	Marek Kanievska	Susan Pleat	11 March 1978
The governor is accused of being too distant by a prison officer.
68	9	"Freedom"	Tony Wharmby	Tony Parker	18 March 1978
69	10	"New Girls"	Michael E. Briant	Kathleen J. Smith	25 March 1978
70	11	"One for the Road"	Peter Moffatt	Peter Wildeblood	1 April 1978
71	12	"Nemesis"	Christopher Hodson	Mona Bruce and Robert James	8 April 1978
Jennifer Rawlings begins serving her life sentence for killing her son's murderer.
72	13	"Is There Anyone There?"	John Gorrie	David Butler	15 April 1978
Tottie Dowd stirs up more trouble in Stone Park.

== The Lost Episode ==
Episode three from series 2, "Nowhere for the Kids", no longer exists in any format, but its script is included in PDF format on Series Two, Disc One. The script is located in the root directory of the DVD and is called "Within These Walls-N#149129.pdf" The script lists St. John's Waterloo church as the rehearsal hall for read-through for the shows.

Despite past indications that this episode was unofficially available on the video-sharing website YouTube, this is not the case.
