= Something Rotten (Gratz novel) =

2007 novel by Alan Gratz

- Author: Alan Gratz
- Language: English
- Series: Horatio Wilkes Mysteries
- Genre: Teen fiction Mystery
- Publisher: Dial Books
- Publication date: 2007
- Publication place: United States
- Media type: Print (hardcover)
- Pages: 208 pp
- ISBN: 978-0-8037-3216-2
- OCLC: 78993285
- LC Class: PZ7.G77224 Som 2007
- Followed by: Something Wicked

Something Rotten is the first novel of the Horatio Wilkes mystery series by Alan Gratz. It loosely follows the plot of Hamlet by William Shakespeare, but it is modernised and set in the United States.

== Plot synopsis ==
Horatio Wilkes visits his friend Hamilton Prince for the summer holidays. Hamilton's father just died and his mother remarried - his uncle. The Princes are very rich. They own a paper plant in Denmark, Tennessee. Unfortunately, the plant seems to pollute the Copenhagen River. At least, that's what Hamilton's beautiful ex-girlfriend Olivia says. When Hamilton and Horatio are confronted with a video of Hamilton's recently deceased father who tells them that he has been poisoned, Horatio promises Hamilton to solve the riddle. On his journey solving this riddle he stumbles across some problems. For instance one of the problems he ran into was when he needed help getting information, and clues Hamilton was always intoxicated. And when Hamilton wasn't intoxicated he was rude and antisocial or was sleeping off his hangover.

== Other editions ==
On March 17, 2011 a German language edition of this book was published under the title Eine Lüge ist Nicht Genug. The title was changed in Germany from Something Rotten to One Lie Is Not Enough. This edition was translated by Gerold Anrich and Martina Instinsky-Anrich and was available in both hardcover and eBook formats.
