= The Pope's Jews =

Book by Gordon Thomas

- Book cover, first edition
- Author: Gordon Thomas
- Language: English
- Publisher: Thomas Dunne Books
- Publication date: 2 October 2012
- ISBN: 978-1250013552

The Pope's Jews: The Vatican's Secret Plan to Save Jews from the Nazis is a 2012 book by the British author Gordon Thomas concerning the efforts of Pope Pius XII to protect Jews during the Nazi Holocaust. The Observer reported in 2013 that "Gordon Thomas, a Protestant, was given access to previously unpublished Vatican documents and tracked down victims, priests and others who had not told their stories before" and had uncovered "evidence on Pius XII's wartime efforts to save Jewish refugees".

== The book ==
The book examines the actions taken by Pope Pius XII and the Catholic Church in Italy to protect Jews and escaped Allied Prisoners of War during World War II. According to The Pope's Jews, Pius XII appointed a priest supplied with funds to provide food, clothing and medicine, while more than 4,000 Jews found safety in hidden monasteries and convents in Italy. Catholic priests were told to supply baptism certificates to hundreds of hidden Jews across Italy during the war, and more than 2,000 Jews in Hungary were given Vatican papers identifying them as Catholics, while a Church network rescued German Jews by bringing them to Rome.

Thomas also examines the relationship between the papacy and the diplomatic community situated in Rome and the Vatican, and their relationships with groups such as Rome's Jewish community, the pro-papal Italian aristocracy, local bishops and priests. Other than the Pope himself, Thomas gives accounts of the city's Chief Rabbi, Israel Zolli; the Gestapo Chief Herbert Kappler; the famous Vatican rescuer of Jews and PoWs, Hugh O'Flaherty; the Pope's secretary and housekeeper Sr. Pascalina Lehnert; and the British Ambassador to the Vatican, Sir D'Arcy Osborne.

== Critical reception ==
In a review for The Irish Times, Emeritus Professor of History Peter C. Kent wrote that the book is a "good read" and that Thomas' style is journalistic narrative, which centres on the Pope attempting to lead his Church through the "chaos of war" and "provide humanitarian assistance" to its victims and while "unprepared to challenge the perpetrators of these cruelties, he was concerned that the suffering should be contained and lent his secret support and funding to the work of a variety of people who helped Jews to escape the Holocaust and anti-fascist soldiers and politicians to hide from their pursuers. The pope encouraged the creation of a network to hide the fugitives in church buildings, monasteries and convents in Italy. Thomas writes that the Pope was kept informed by his secretary and his housekeeper of the way the Vatican was able to help people in Rome during this trying time."

In a review for the Jewish Book Council, professor emeritus of history Jack Fischel described the book as "riveting narrative, which reads like a novel rather than a work of scholarship (conversations are recorded without footnoting sources)". Fischel noted that the actions of Pius XII during the war have become one of the more contentious issues in Holocaust historiography, and that Thomas' book adds a further examination of the controversy of whether Pius "by ordering the use of convents and monasteries as sanctuaries for Jews, had done all in his power to confront the Nazi perpetrators of the Holocaust". Fischel wrote that Thomas reveals that the Pope devised a strategy of "silence" in the belief that denunciation would provoke further reprisals against the Jews. Fischel added this assessment of the topic: "Pius’s 'silence,' however, was deafening during the deportation of Rome’s Jews (let alone the rest of European Jewry) to Auschwitz and other death camps. Thomas recreates the agony of the Nazi roundup and deportation of Rome’s Jews, which took place almost under the pope’s window, thus raising the question why he had not warned the Jews that mass extermination was about to happen? The Pope’s strategy of silence also does not explain other questions dealing with his response to Hitler’s war against the Jews: When it was apparent that the strategy of “silence” was not effective, why didn’t the Pope issue an encyclical condemning the Holocaust? Why did he not excommunicate Nazi Catholics, including Hitler and Himmler? Why did the pope’s Christmas message both in 1942 and 1943 not address the deportation of the Jews?"

== See also ==
- Catholic resistance to Nazism
- Catholic Church and Nazi Germany
- Pope Pius XII and the Holocaust
- Hitler's Pope
