= Lord Mountbatten: The Last Viceroy =

1986 British TV series

- Genre: Historical drama
- Written by: David Butler; Alan Campbell-Johnson
- Directed by: Tom Clegg
- Starring: Nicol Williamson; Janet Suzman
- Composer: John Scott
- Country of origin: United Kingdom
- Original language: English
- No. of episodes: 6

Production
- Producer: Judith de Paul
- Running time: 50 minutes

Original release
- Network: ITV
- Release: January 26 – March 2, 1986

Lord Mountbatten: The Last Viceroy is a British television series that first aired on ITV in 1986. It depicts Lord Mountbatten's time as Supreme Commander, South-East Asia in the Second World War, and then as Viceroy of India shortly after the war in the days leading up to Indian independence. The film was shot in India. Originally it was planned that a few parts would be shot in Sri Lanka, but due to the Sri Lankan civil war, this plan was revised.

== Main cast ==
- Nicol Williamson ... Lord Mountbatten
- Janet Suzman ... Lady Mountbatten
- Dreya Weber ... Lady Pamela Hicks
- Wendy Hiller ... Princess Victoria of Hesse and by Rhine
- A.K. Hangal ... Vallabhbhai Patel
- Owen Holder ... King George VI
- David Lyon ... Lt Col Vernon Erskine-Crum
- Patrick Allen ... Claude Auchinleck
- Michael Byrne ... George Abell
- Sam Dastor ... Mahatma Gandhi
- Derek Reed... Patrick Spens
- Nigel Davenport ... Hastings Ismay, 1st Baron Ismay
- David Quilter ... Alan Campbell Johnson
- Ian Richardson ... Jawaharlal Nehru
- Nadim Sawalha ... Liaquat Ali Khan
- Tony Wredden ... Maulana Azad
- Saloni Kaur ... Indira Gandhi (née Nehru)
- Sumant Mastakar ... C. Rajagopalachari
- Nitin Sethi ... Rajendra Prasad
- John Rolfe ... Clement Attlee
- Zia Mohyeddin ... V. P. Menon
- Vladek Sheybal ... Muhammad Ali Jinnah
- Jeremy Sinden ... Ronald Brockman
- Nana Patekar ...Nathuram Godse
- Malcolm Terris ... Winston Churchill
- Minnie Boga ... Amrit Kaur
- Roger Hammond ... Cyril Radcliffe
- Sushma Seth ... Vijaya Lakshmi Pandit
- Villoo Kapadia ... Fatima Jinnah

== See also ==
- List of artistic depictions of Mahatma Gandhi
