= Voyage of the Damned =

1976 film

- Film poster by Richard Amsel
- Directed by: Stuart Rosenberg
- Screenplay by: Steve Shagan; David Butler
- Based on: Voyage of the Damned; 1974 book by Gordon Thomas and Max Morgan-Witts
- Produced by: Robert Fryer; William Hill
- Starring: Faye Dunaway; Max von Sydow; Oskar Werner; Malcolm McDowell; Orson Welles; James Mason; Lee Grant; Katharine Ross; Luther Adler; Michael Constantine; Denholm Elliott; José Ferrer; Lynne Frederick; Helmut Griem; Julie Harris; Wendy Hiller; Paul Koslo; Nehemiah Persoff; Fernando Rey; Leonard Rossiter; Maria Schell; Victor Spinetti; Janet Suzman; Sam Wanamaker; Ben Gazzara
- Cinematography: Billy Williams
- Edited by: Tom Priestley
- Music by: Lalo Schifrin
- Production company: ITC Entertainment
- Distributed by: Rank Film Distributors (United Kingdom); AVCO Embassy Pictures (United States)
- Release dates: 19 December 1976 (Premiere); 22 December 1976 (Los Angeles and New York City)
- Running time: 155 minutes
- Countries: United Kingdom; United States
- Language: English
- Budget: $7.3 million
- Box office: $1,750,000

Voyage of the Damned is a 1976 drama film directed by Stuart Rosenberg, with an all-star cast featuring Faye Dunaway, Oskar Werner, Lee Grant, Max von Sydow, James Mason, and Malcolm McDowell.

The story was inspired by actual events concerning the fate of the ocean liner MS St. Louis carrying Jewish refugees from Nazi Germany to Cuba in 1939. It was based on a 1974 nonfiction book of the same title written by Gordon Thomas and Max Morgan-Witts. The screenplay was written by Steve Shagan and David Butler. The film was produced by ITC Entertainment and released by Rank Film Distributors in the UK and Avco Embassy Pictures in the United States.

== Plot ==
Based on historic events, this dramatic film concerns the 1939 voyage of the German-flagged MS St. Louis, which departed from Hamburg carrying 937 Jews from Germany, bound for Havana, Cuba. The passengers, having seen and suffered rising anti-Semitism in Germany, realized this might be their only chance to escape. The film details the emotional journey of the passengers, who gradually become aware that their passage was planned as an exercise in Nazi propaganda, and that Germany had never intended that they disembark in Cuba. Rather, they were to be set up as pariahs, to set an example before the world. As a Nazi official states in the film, when the whole world has refused to accept the Jews as refugees, no country can blame Germany for their fate.

The Cuban government refuses entry to the passengers while the ship is on its way, and next the liner heads to the United States. As it waits off the Florida coast, the passengers learn that the United States also has rejected them, as Canada subsequently does, leaving the captain no choice but to return to Europe. The captain tells a confidante that he has received a letter signed by 200 passengers saying they will join hands and jump into the sea rather than return to Germany. He states his intention to run the liner aground on a reef off the southern coast of England, to allow the passengers to be rescued and reach safety there.

Shortly before the film's end, it is revealed that the governments of Belgium, France, the Netherlands, and the United Kingdom have each agreed to accept a share of the passengers as refugees. As they cheer and clap at the news, footnotes disclose the fates of some of the main characters, suggesting that more than 600 of the 937 passengers who did not resettle in Britain but in other European nations instead and were ultimately deported and murdered in Nazi concentration camps.

== Cast ==
- Faye Dunaway as Denise Kreisler
- Max von Sydow as Captain Schroeder
- Oskar Werner as Professor Egon Kreisler
- Malcolm McDowell as Max Gunter
- Orson Welles as José Estedes
- James Mason as Dr. Juan Remos
- Lee Grant as Lili Rosen
- Katharine Ross as Mira Hauser
- Ben Gazzara as Morris Troper
- Luther Adler as Professor Weiler
- Michael Constantine as Luis Clasing
- Denholm Elliott as Admiral Canaris
- José Ferrer as Manuel Benitez
- Lynne Frederick as Anna Rosen
- Helmut Griem as Otto Schiendick
- Julie Harris as Alice Fienchild
- Wendy Hiller as Rebecca Weiler
- Paul Koslo as Aaron Pozner
- Nehemiah Persoff as Mr. Hauser
- Fernando Rey as President Bru
- Leonard Rossiter as Commander Von Bonin
- Maria Schell as Mrs. Hauser
- Victor Spinetti as Dr. Erich Strauss
- Janet Suzman as Leni Strauss
- Sam Wanamaker as Carl Rosen
- Keith Barron as Purser Mueller
- Ian Cullen as Radio Officer
- David Daker as First Officer
- Brian Gilbert as Laurenz Schulman
- Constantine Gregory as Navigation Officer (credited as Constantin de Goguel)
- Georgina Hale as Lotte Schulman
- Don Henderson as Engineering Officer
- Bernard Hepton as Milton Goldsmith
- Anthony Higgins as Seaman Heinz Berg
- Donald Houston as Dr. Glauner
- Frederick Jaeger as Werner Mannheim
- David de Keyser as Joseph Joseph
- Della McDermott as Julia Strauss
- Günter Meisner as Robert Hoffman (credited as Guenter Meisner)
- Jonathan Pryce as Joseph Manasse
- Marika Rivera as Madame in Bordello
- Ina Skriver as Singer
- Milo Sperber as Rabbi
- Philip Stone as Secretary
- Adele Strong as Mrs. Schulman
- Genevieve West as Sarah Strauss
- Carl Duering as German Ambassador (uncredited)
- Tom Laughlin as Engineering Officer (uncredited)
- Laura Gemser as Estedes' friend (uncredited)

== Production ==
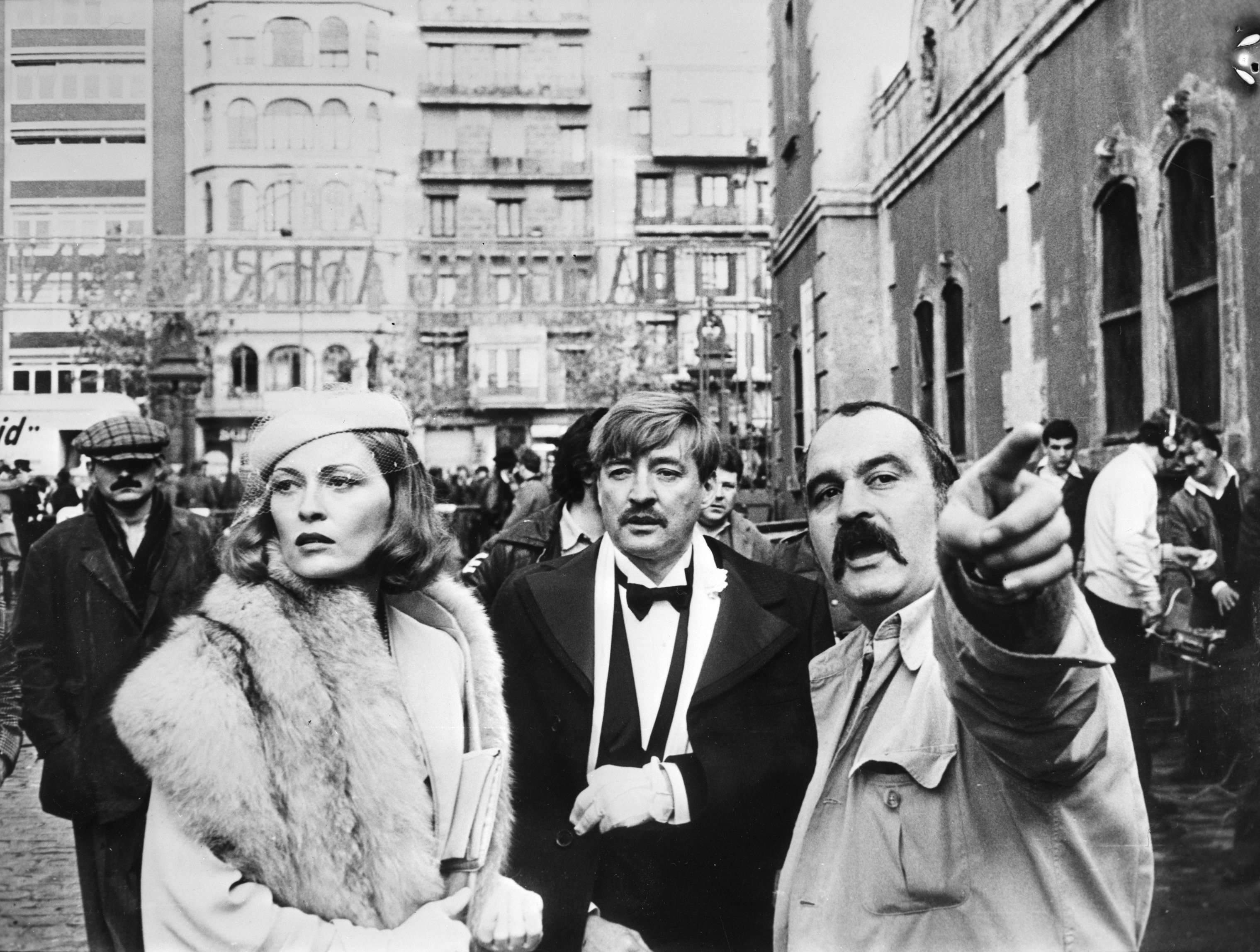
Faye Dunaway, Oskar Werner and director Stuart Rosenberg on location in Barcelona

The book was published in 1974. The Los Angeles Times called it "a human document of rare and discerning power". The book was a best seller, and the authors earned an estimated £500,000 from it.

Rights to the book were acquired in 1974. It was originally envisioned as an ABC Movie of the Week but its budget of $7.3 million was too expensive.

The film was the first feature of Associated General Films.

Dunaway was paid $500,000 plus a percentage of the profits.

The movie was filmed on board the chartered Italian ocean liner Irpinia, which was fitted with two false funnels in order to resemble St. Louis. It was also shot on location in Barcelona, Spain (standing in for Cuba), St. Pancras Chambers in London, and at the EMI Elstree Studios in Borehamwood, Hertfordshire.

== Release ==
The film opened on 22 December 1976 in four theatres in New York and Los Angeles.

=== Box office ===
According to Lew Grade who helped finance the film, the movie "should have done better" at the box office. He wrote in his memoirs "I thought it was one of the most moving and important films I'd seen in a long time. I just couldn't understand why it didn't become a success" adding that "strangely enough, it did outstanding business in Japan."

== Accolades ==
Award	Category	Nominee(s)	Result	Ref.
Academy Awards	Best Supporting Actress	Lee Grant	Nominated	
Academy Awards	Best Screenplay – Based on Material from Another Medium	David Butler and Steve Shagan	Nominated	
Academy Awards	Best Original Score	Lalo Schifrin	Nominated	
Golden Globe Awards	Best Motion Picture – Drama		Nominated	
Golden Globe Awards	Best Supporting Actor – Motion Picture	Oskar Werner	Nominated	
Golden Globe Awards	Best Supporting Actress – Motion Picture	Lee Grant	Nominated	
Golden Globe Awards	Best Supporting Actress – Motion Picture	Katharine Ross	Won	
Golden Globe Awards	Best Screenplay – Motion Picture	David Butler and Steve Shagan	Nominated	
Golden Globe Awards	Best Original Score – Motion Picture	Lalo Schifrin	Nominated	
Japan Academy Film Prize	Outstanding Foreign Language Film		Nominated	

== Soundtrack ==
Voyage of the Damned

Soundtrack album by Lalo Schifrin
- Released: 1977
- Recorded: 12 and 13 April 1977; Wembley, England
- Genre: Film score
- Labels: Entr'Acte; ERS 6508-ST
- Producer: John Lasher

Lalo Schifrin chronology
Towering Toccata (1976)	Voyage of the Damned (1977)	Rollercoaster (1977)

The film score was composed, arranged and conducted by Lalo Schifrin and the soundtrack album was released on the Entr'Acte label in 1977.

=== Track listing ===
All tracks are written by Lalo Schifrin.

No.	Title	Length
1.	"Main Title"	2:21
2.	"House Painter March"	1:49
3.	"Hotel Nacionale"	2:18
4.	"What's Past is Past; Affirmation of Love"	2:51
5.	"Lament"	2:30
6.	"The Arrival; Theme of Hope"	3:21
7.	"The Captain; Goodbye Aunt Jenny; We Need Help"	3:11
8.	"So Many Things I Wanted to Say"	2:08
9.	"To Be A Woman"	2:07
10.	"Tragedy; Time Pulse"	3:59
11.	"Our Prayers Have Been Answered"	2:16
12.	"End Credits (Foxtrot)"	2:30

=== Personnel ===
- Lalo Schifrin - arranger, conductor
- London Studio Orchestra

== Actual death toll ==
The true death toll is uncertain. The 1974 book that was the basis of the film estimated a much lower number of deaths. By using statistical analysis of survival rates for Jews in various Nazi-occupied countries, Thomas and Morgan-Witts estimated the fate of the 621 St. Louis passengers who were not given refuge in Cuba or the United Kingdom (one died during the voyage): 44 (20%) of the 224 refugees that settled in France likely were murdered in the Holocaust, 62 (29%) Holocaust murders amongst the 214 that reached Belgium, and 121 (67%) Holocaust murders amongst the 181 that settled in the Netherlands, for a total of 227 (37%) of the refugees that came under occupation were likely murdered by the Nazis. In 1998, Scott Miller and Sarah Ogilvie of the United States Holocaust Memorial Museum traced the survivors from the voyage, concluding that a total of 254 refugees or 40.9 percent were murdered by the Nazis.

== Alternate version ==
An extended version of the film running 182 minutes was broadcast on television and released on home video. Apparently this is an earlier version of the film, which was created by editor Roger Cherrill according to a note in the end credits.

The extended cut was released on VHS twice: once on NTSC VHS by Magnetic Video in 1980, and once on PAL VHS by Polygram Home Video in the UK. The Polygram cassette is undated and only contains the copyright of the original production, 1976. It also lists the running time as 176 minutes; the difference in run times can be attributed to the differential between PAL and NTSC frame rates.

The extended cut was released as part of a Blu-Ray boxset in Australia from Imprint on September 26, 2024.

== See also ==
- List of American films of 1976
- Jewish refugees
- Ship of Fools
