= Nazi persecution of Jews during the 1936 Olympic Games =

The 1936 Summer Olympic Games were hosted in Germany in the National Socialist period, as determined by voting of the International Olympic Committee (IOC) between May 1930 and April 1931, two years prior to the rise of the National Socialist German Workers Party (NSDAP; Nazi Party) to power. Nazi influence in Germany grew strongly after the German Federal Elections in 1932, and in January 1933, Adolf Hitler, the head of the Nazi Party, was appointed Chancellor and soon began to put his antisemitic ideology into practice.

By the time of the 1932 Olympics the Nazis were so much opposed to international competition that the International Olympic Committee sent its German member Karl Ritter von Halt to Hitler to reaffirm that the Games could take place at all in case the Nazis were in government. Hitler mainly said that international obligations were being kept, but did not show any enthusiasm for the Games. During 1933, Hitler's position changed and as of October 1933 the Games were seen by Hitler as a time to show the strength of the new Nazi Germany to the world; not only would the festivities be exciting and bold, but Hitler anticipated the Germans would dominate in every aspect of athletic competition. According to pseudoscientific Nazi racial theories, the Germans were seen as a "master race" whose physical prowess would be showcased at the Olympics.

== Nazi Party views on sports and athletics ==
The Nazis established a dictatorship in 1933, arresting their political rivals, and sought to bring all public and private institutions under their control. However, when it came to hosting the Olympics, there were no separate Nazi sports organizations. Joseph Goebbels, the Nazi propaganda Minister, was of the opinion that simply gaining power was only part of the process in creating the new German state; the Nazis needed to win the heart of the people. Sports were crucial to this success, as according to him it would "strengthen the character of the German people, imbuing it with the fighting spirit and steadfast camaraderie necessary in the struggle for its existence". Eventually Goebbels' ministry had eleven sections dedicated to athletics. Jewish athletes were expelled from all organized athletics, as mandated by the German Olympic Committee.

== Organization and propaganda ==
Invitations to the Games were sent out to the Olympic Committees of various countries. Publicly, in sports and athletics Hitler had no stated policies about athletes and competitors, but his racism had caused worry among members of the IOC. Finland and Italy were the first to accept. Support for the Games within Germany was heavily sought after by Joseph Goebbels. He believed that every German should share in the responsibility of presenting the Games to the rest of the world. Goebbels' Ministry promoted the Olympics with colorful posters and athletic imagery, drawing a link between Nazi Germany and ancient Greece. Leni Reifenstahl, the film maker behind Triumph of the Will (1934), was employed and created a controversial documentary titled Olympia (1938) about the Summer Games. Elaborate plans were created and constructed, including a new stadium as well as a state-of-the-art Olympic Village. Hitler placed the full resources of the state behind the Olympic preparations. Goebbels and the Nazi regime covered up their violent, racist policies throughout the Games by removing anti-Semitic signs and toning back rhetoric of newspapers. Orders were made to allow foreign visitors to bypass certain laws and not be subjugated to Nazi homophobic laws. Tourists were mainly unaware of the change in the political atmosphere, thus the Nazi regime was successful in bypassing foreign scrutiny of their racial policies. The Games were exploited by Hitler and his Party, and spectators and journalists from around the world were presented with the fraudulent image of a tolerant and peaceful Germany.

=== Foreign appeasement ===
The International Olympic Committee as well the Committees of several countries, attempted to rectify the racial issues in Germany. Henri de Baillet-Latour, the President of the IOC, was aware of the German sports authorities and the restrictive training possibilities for 'non-Aryans'. Boycott movements around the world surfaced in the United States, Great Britain, France, Sweden, Czechoslovakia, and the Netherlands, as rumors of Nazi racism spread. Fierce debate occurred in the United States, causing some worry to the Nazis. The United States traditionally sends one of the largest teams to the games, generating interest and tourism. Many individual Jewish athletes boycotted the games or their country's qualifying trials. However, Baillet-Latour continued to support the German Olympic Committee, and reassured foreign visitors to the Nazi Games that they would, "receive a cordial welcome without the risk of experiencing anything which might offend their principles". The boycott movement eventually failed.

== Jewish athletes excluded from participation ==
The 'Aryans only' policies in Nazi Germany caused many world-class athletes to be left out of competitions. Jews or individuals with Jewish parents were systematically excluded from German sports facilities and associations. What follows is a short list of specific athletes banned from representing their country in world events.

- Erich Seelig, Boxer, expelled from the German Boxing Association
- Daniel Prenn, Tennis, removed from Germany's Davis Cup Team, and banned from international competition
- Gretel Bergmann, High Jump, expelled from her German Club in 1933, and from the National Team in 1936

=== German placation ===
Helene Mayer, a fencer, was allowed on the German National Team in order to appease international opinion. She did not consider herself as Jewish, but she was viewed as 'non-Aryan' because her father was Jewish. Meyer went on to win a silver medal, and on the podium, like all other German athletes, proceeded to give the Nazi salute.
