= Refugee (Gratz novel) =

Book by Alan Gratz

First edition

Refugee is a middle grade novel by Alan Gratz published by Scholastic Corporation in 2017.

The book revolves around three main characters from three different eras: early Nazi Germany, 1990s Cuba, and a civil war-torn Syria. It follows Josef Landau, a German Jew in the 1930s, who tries to leave Germany to Cuba, Isabel Fernandez, a Cuban girl in 1994, who tries to escape Cuba's hunger crisis following the dissolution of the Soviet Union to the US, and Mahmoud Bishara, a Syrian youth in 2015 whose house gets destroyed by a missile and whose family decides to seek asylum in Germany. It has received positive reviews, which praised its style and historical accuracy. The novel eventually made it to The New York Times Best Seller list.

== Storylines ==
=== Josef Landau ===
Josef Landau is a 12-year-old Jewish boy running from Nazi Germany in 1938. After his father is released from the Dachau concentration camp he comes out very traumatized, the family boards MS St. Louis captained by Captain Schröder in hopes of finding asylum in Cuba. During this time, Josef feels like a man and that it's his responsibility to take care of his family. With his father's mental health deteriorating quickly, Josef threatens him to ensure that he can pass the medical inspection to get into Cuba, reversing their roles as father and son. While the passengers wait to be allowed to disembark, Josef encounters Mariano Padron (who is later revealed to be Isabel Fernadez's grandfather), who is a Cuban government officer bound by his governmental duty not to let the Jewish refugees in, despite feeling sorry for them. Josef's maturation continues as the situation worsens: after his father attempts suicide by jumping off the boat, he alone is allowed to disembark for medical attention in Cuba. Rachel is stricken with grief at the family separation, so Josef makes sure that Ruthie is being cared for and protected while their mother is unable to provide this care. When the Jewish refugees are rejected from entering Cuba, the United States and Canada, and it seems likely that the ship is going to take them back to Germany, Josef works with other passengers to try to take the ship hostage so that they can avoid this fate.

They fail, but they are not sent back to Germany due to the captain's intervention. Instead, passengers are divided up among Allied European nations, with Josef's family going to France, where they stay. However, when Germany invades and begins occupying France at the end of the novel, the Nazis give his mother the choice of setting only one of her children free Josef, or her little sister Ruthie. Josef sacrifices himself to relieve his mother from the burden of this choice, and to save his little sister Ruthie from the concentration camps. Josef later dies in a camp, as does his mother. It is later learned that Josef's father was alive and well in Cuba, but then died before Ruthie got to him.

=== Isabel Fernandez ===
Isabel Fernandez is 11 years old in 1994, growing up in Havana, Cuba, under Fidel Castro's communist regime. Isabel is deeply tied to her Cuban heritage, particularly through her music. One issue she experiences, however, is that she is unable to count a Cuban rhythm called clave, which she thinks is made to come naturally to Cubans. Isabel takes on a great deal of responsibility for her family due to the upheaval in which she lives. When her father, Geraldo, is worried that the police are coming after him for protesting, Isabel rallies her own family and another family, the Castillos, to take a boat to Miami and escape the oppression of Cuba. She trades her trumpet for gasoline in order to get the boat to start. Among the people who join Isabel on the journey is her grandfather Lito, who is eventually revealed to be Mariano Padron, the Cuban officer who, decades ago, prevented Josef from entering Havana. Isabel spends much of the dangerous trip acting as an adult: she takes care of her eight-and-a-half-months pregnant mother, Teresa; she saves Señor Castillo when he is thrown overboard by waves; and she spends much of the trip relentlessly bailing out water from their boat so that they can continue their journey. Isabel also deals with a fair share of trauma that expedites this maturity: two years prior, her grandmother Lita drowned during a cyclone in Havana, and on this boat trip Isabel's best friend, Iván Castillo, is killed in the water by sharks bloodily. Despite her grief, Isabel is able to persevere and guide her family to reach the shores of Miami. At the end of the book, Isabel is able to reconnect with her heritage when her great-uncle Guillermo gives her a new trumpet, and Isabel is able to count clave while playing Star-Spangled Banner on her trumpet to remember Iván and Lito .

=== Mahmoud Bishara ===
In the novel, Mahmoud Bishara is a 12-year-old living in Aleppo, Syria in 2015. He resides with his parents Yousef and Fatima, his brother Waleed, who is a 10-year-old, and his sister Hana, a baby. Mahmoud lived through the trauma of the Syrian Civil War, which has already been raging for four years, in Mahmoud's story. Mahmoud copes with these conditions by protecting Waleed and learning to assimilate with everyone else for survival. After a missile destroys their apartment, the Bishara family hurriedly flees Syria. They travel through several countries and end up in Greece, waiting for a boat. As Mahmoud and his family travel from Greece, they become stranded in the Mediterranean Sea when their boat capsizes in the water. When another dinghy passes by that doesn't have space for his family, he offers up Hana to them to ensure that she can survive. Mahmoud's family continue to cross different countries: North Macedonia, Serbia, Hungary, and Austria. Soon enough, Mahmoud and his family make it to Germany and are given shelter by a family. This family consists of the elderly Saul Rosenberg and his wife, Ruthie, Josef's little sister, who survived the Holocaust. Hana’s fate is unknown, however the Bishara family hopes that she is alive and safe.
