= Code of Honor (Gratz novel) =

Young adult novel by Alan Gratz

- Author: Alan Gratz
- Language: English
- Subject: Islamic terrorism
- Genre: Historical fiction and Adventure
- Publisher: Scholastic Corporation
- Publication date: August 25, 2015
- Pages: 288
- ISBN: 978-0-545-69519-0 Jacketed hardcover
- Website: www.alangratz.com/writing/code-of-honor

Code of Honor is a young adult historical fiction novel by Alan Gratz. The book is a "timely, heart-racing action-adventure about the War on Terror and the bond between brothers." Code of Honor was published by Scholastic Inc in 2015. Since then, the book has received critical acclaim, winning and being nominated for many awards.

== Awards ==
Awards for Code of Honor
Year	Award	Result	Ref.
2016	International Thriller Writers Award for Best Young Adult Novel	Nominee	
2016	YALSA Quick Picks for Reluctant Young Adult Readers	Winner	
2018	South Carolina Junior Book Award	Winner	
2016	Tome Society It List	Nominee	
2018	Nebraska Golden Sower Award	Nominee	
2018	Georgia Peach Teen Award	Nominee	
