= Kimberly Colen =

American writer

- Born: Kimberly Ann Colen; June 20, 1957; Dallas, Texas
- Died: July 30, 2001 (aged 44); Dallas, Texas
- Other name: Kimberly C. Koenigsberg
- Occupation: Writer

Kimberly Ann Colen Koenigsberg (June 20, 1957 – July 30, 2001) was a children's book author for the Scholastic Corporation.

== Early life and education ==
Colen was born in Dallas, Texas, the daughter of William Joel Colen and Artyce Joan Aronson Colen. Her father owned a brick company, and her mother was an artist. She graduated from Hillcrest High School, and from the University of Texas at Austin in 1979.

== Career ==
Colen mainly wrote books for young readers, published by the Scholastic Corporation, including My Hanukkah Book, My Birthday Book, and Our Class Memory Album. She also co-edited Hold Fast Your Dreams, a collection of twenty commencement speeches.

== Publications ==
- My Hanukkah Book: Questions, Answers, Activities (1987, illustrated by Richard Rosenblum)
- My Birthday Book (1988, illustrated by Carol Hudson)
- Our Class Memory Album (1993)
- Kids Can Care about Mammals and Learn about Responsibility! (1994, with Judy Mitchell illustrated by Gary Mohrman)
- A Note from Your Teacher (1995, illustrated by Darcy Tom)
- Peas and Honey: Recipes for Kids (1995, illustrated by Mandy Victor)
- Hold Fast to Your Dreams: Twenty Commencement Speeches (1996; co-editor, with Carrie Boyko)
- The Only Baby-Sitting Book You'll Ever Need: a Guide for Parents (1997; with Judy Mitchell, illustrated by Lucyna A. M. Green)

== Personal life and legacy ==
Colen married psychiatrist Alan David Koenigsberg in 1994. She died in 2001 after complications from skin cancer. The Kimberly Colen Memorial Grant was given annually in her honor by the Society of Children's Book Writers and Illustrators and her family, to one or two promising children's author looking to get their first book published.
