= Prisoner B-3087 =

Young adult novel by Alan Gratz

- Author: Alan Gratz
- Language: English
- Publisher: Scholastic Inc.
- Publication date: March 1, 2013
- Publication place: United States
- ISBN: 9780545459013

Prisoner B-3087 is a young adult historical fiction novel by Alan Gratz. The book is "based on the true story of Ruth and Jack Gruener," who were prisoners during the Holocaust. Prisoner B-3087 was published by Scholastic Inc in 2013.

== Plot summary ==
Yanek Gruener is a 10-year-old boy living in Kraków, Poland in 1939 when Adolf Hitler invades, at the beginning of World War II. Once the Nazi Party takes over the city, Yanek and his family are forced to live in the Krakow Ghetto, with other Jewish families. For three years, Yanek lived in cramped small two-bedroom apartments housing 20 people of different families, watching other families and loved ones being taken to different concentration camps, knowing they were not returning. When Yanek was thirteen years old, he and his uncle were taken to the Plaszow Concentration Camp, where they worked in the tailor shops making uniforms for the German soldiers and fellow prisoners. After the death of his uncle, he was employed through the concentration camp to work in an enamelware factory by a man named Oskar Schindler. Sadly, he was transferred away from Plaszow three months before Schindler started to save the Jewish prisoners who worked in his factory. After one year in the Plaszow Concentration Camp, Yanek was moved to the Wieliczka Salt Mine and worked in the mines for a short time until he was moved to Trzebinia Concentration Camp. The Nazi soldiers and Kapos treated the prisoners like a game. Yanek spent his days digging pits for his fellow prisoners when they inevitably died. After less than a year in Trzebinia, Yanek and the other prisoners were shoved into cattle cars and transported to Birkenau Concentration camp. Once he arrived, Yanek and the other Jewish prisoners were led into the shower. Believing they were to die, they started to yell at the guards, telling them not to waste time and kill them already. Instead, they were met with water, after which they were given new clothes and shoes. Yanek got his B-3087 tattoo. While in Birkenau, Yanek stood with a 13 year old boy during his bar mitzvah and worked to keep himself alive until he was moved from Birkenau to its sister camp, Auschwitz.

Yanek and his fellow prisoners were forced to walk to his sixth concentration camp, Auschwitz, only stopping along the way to pick up more Jewish prisoners. There, he was moved to the right by Dr. Mengele along with the rest of the men. After surviving Auschwitz, he was part of a two-week-long death march to Sachsenhausen Concentration Camp. Shortly after arriving, he was forced back into a cattle car and sent to Bergen-Belsen Concentration Camp. There, due to their poor health and weak bodies, the Nazi official ordered all the Jewish prisoners not to work for a week and instead eat and regain their strength. Shortly after that, he was shoved back into a cattle car and sent off to Buchenwald Concentration Camp. Unlike the other concentration camps, Buchenwald was open to the public as a zoo, ran by Karl Koch and his wife, nicknamed "the witch of Buchenwald". After surviving the witch of Buchenwald, Yanek was once again placed in a cattle car and sent to Gross-Rosen Concentration Camp, where he lost a button on his jacket and got more than 20 lashes before he was sent on his second death march. This time he was sent to Dachau Concentration camp, his tenth one, where he was eventually saved from imprisonment by American soldiers.

== Reception ==
Prisoner B-3087 is a Junior Library Guild book.

Kirkus Reviews called Prisoner B-3087 "A bone-chilling tale not to be ignored by the universe." Publishers Weekly wrote that Gratz's "determination to be exhaustively inclusive, along with lapses into History Channel–like prose, threatens to overwhelm the story. But more often, Gratz ably conveys Yanek’s incredulity ..., fatalism, yearning, and determination in the face of the unimaginable." Debra Gold, writing for the Jewish Book Council noted, "The language, sparse yet provocative, draws the reader in and, like Night by Elie Wiesel, poignantly shows the darkness of the Holocaust with always the possibility of hope and survival."

Bank Street College of Education named Prisoner B-3087 one of the best books of 2014 for children ages 12–14.

Awards for Prisoner B-3087
| Year | Award | Result | Ref. |
|---|---|---|---|
| 2014 | Best Fiction for Young Adults | Selection | |
| 2013 | Goodreads Choice Award for Best Middle Grade & Children's | Nominee | |
| 2013 | Cybils Award for Middle Grade Fiction | Finalist | |
