= Charles A. Foster =

English academic and nonfiction author

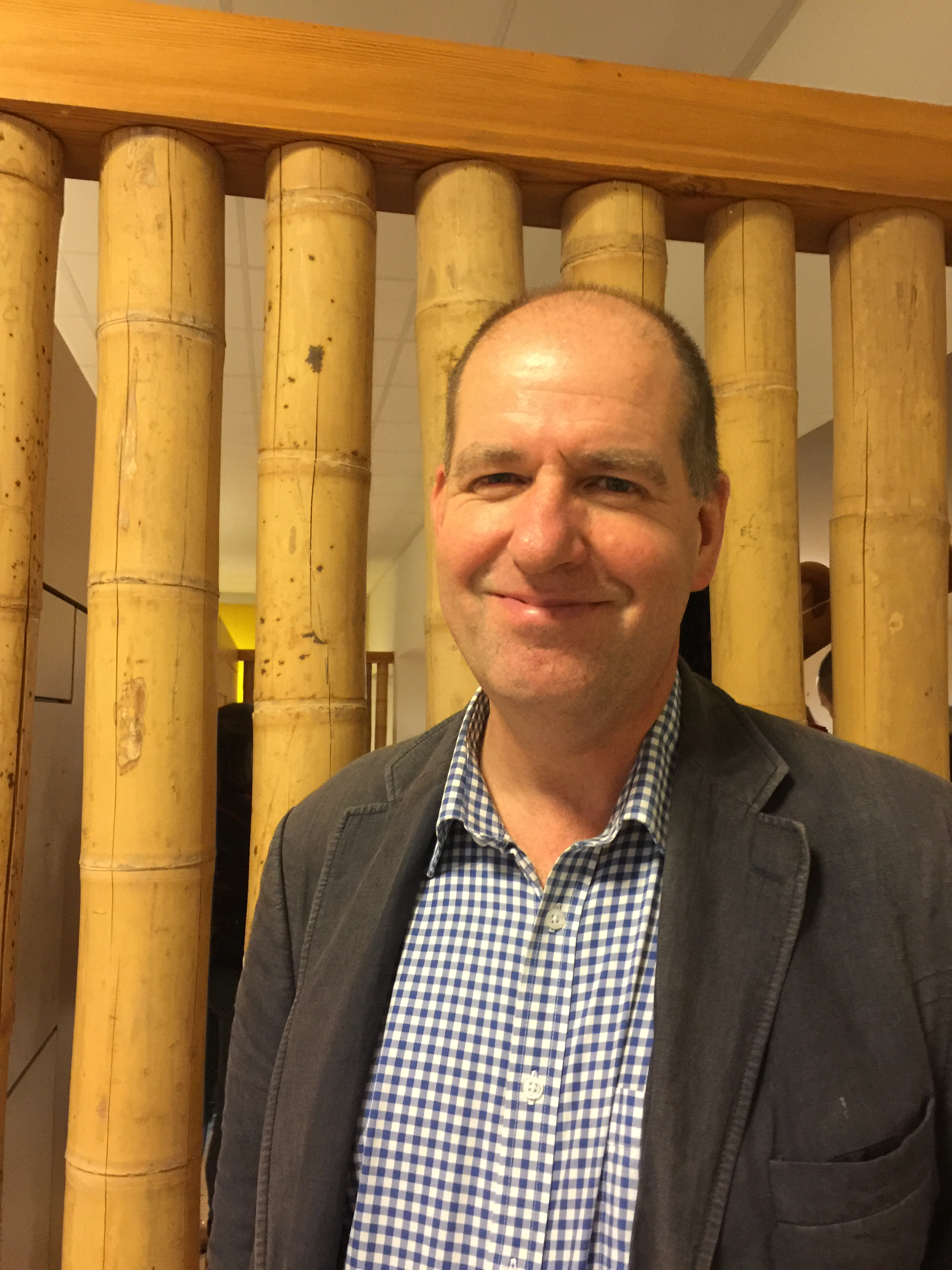
Charles Foster (2019)

Charles Foster is an English writer, philosopher, traveller, barrister and veterinarian. He is known for his books and articles on Natural History, travel (particularly in Africa and the Middle East), theology, law and medical ethics. He is a Fellow of Exeter College, Oxford. He says of his own books: 'Ultimately they are all presumptuous and unsuccessful attempts to answer the questions 'who or what are we?', and 'what on earth are we doing here?'

== Education ==
He was educated at Shrewsbury School and St John's College, Cambridge, where he read Veterinary Medicine and Law. He holds a PhD in medical law and ethics from the University of Cambridge. He is a qualified veterinary surgeon. He was called to the Bar by the Inner Temple.

== Career ==
After Cambridge he worked on the comparative anatomy of the Himalayan Hispid hare and chemotaxis in leeches, worked in Saudi Arabia studying the immobilisation of Goitred and Mountain gazelles, and did pupillage at the English Bar. He practises at the Bar in London, primarily in medical law, and has been involved in some of the most significant cases of recent years. He was called to the Bar of the Republic of Ireland in 1996. He teaches Medical Law and Ethics at the University of Oxford and from 2009 was a Fellow of Green Templeton College, Oxford. He left the college in 2022, when he was elected a Fellow of Exeter College, Oxford.

His expeditions have included the Danakil Depression in Ethiopia, studying water metabolism in mules; ecological surveys in the Quirimbas Archipelago, northern Mozambique, and a successful ski expedition to the North Pole. He is a Fellow of the Royal Geographical Society and the Linnean Society.

In the fields of law and philosophy he is probably best known for his criticisms of the hegemony of autonomy in medical ethics (in 'Choosing Life, Choosing Death' (2009)), and for his contention that the 'Four Principles' approach of Tom Beauchamp and James Childress is redundant, and should be replaced by an analysis based on a broadly Aristotelian account of human dignity ('Human Dignity in Bioethics and Law' (2011)).

Many of his writings on religion have been attacked as heretical by conservative Christians, particularly in the US.

As part of his philosophical investigations relating to authenticity and identity, he has tried living as a badger, an otter, an urban fox, a red deer and a swift, and he has written about this in his book Being a Beast in 2016. 'Being a Beast' was a New York Times Bestseller, was long-listed for the Baillie Gifford Prize and the Wainwright Prize for Nature Writing, and won the Deux Millions d’Amis literary prize (France). For living in the wild as, at different times, a badger, an otter, a deer, a fox, and a bird, he won an Ig Nobel prize in Biology.

He is married, with six children.

== Bibliography ==
Authored books include

- Disclosure and Confidentiality: FT Law and Tax, 1996 (with T. Wynn and N. Ainley)
- Clinical confidentiality: Monitor Press, 2000 (with Nick Peacock)
- Drafting: Cavendish, 2nd Ed. 2001 (with Elmer Doonan).
- Civil Advocacy: Cavendish (with Charles Bourne, Jacqui Gilliatt and Prashant Popat): 2nd Ed. (2001)
- Clinical Guidelines: Law, policy and practice: Cavendish, (2002) (Ed)
- Regulating Health Care Quality: Legal and Professional Issues: Butterworth Heinemann/Elsevier Science (Editor, with John Tingle and Kay Wheat) (2004)
- Travellers in the Near East: Stacey International (Editor) (2004)
- Elements of Medical Law: Barry Rose (2005)
- The Jesus Inquest: Monarch Books and Thomas Nelson (2006).
- The Christmas mystery: What on earth happened at Bethlehem?: Authentic (2007)
- Medical mistakes: Claerhout Law Publishers (2007)
- Elements of Medical Law: (2nd Edition): Claerhout Law Publishers (2007)
- Tracking the Ark of the Covenant: Lion Hudson (2007)
- The Selfless Gene: Living with God and Darwin: Hodder (2008)
- Choosing Life, choosing Death – The Tyranny of Autonomy in Medical Law and Ethics: Hart (2009)
- In the hot unconscious: An Indian Journey, 2012, Tranquebar
- Medical Law: A Very Short Introduction, 2013, Oxford University Press
- Dementia: Law and ethics (Ed), 2014, Hart
- Altruism, Welfare and the Law, 2015, Springer (with Jonathan Herring)
- Being a Beast, 2016, Profile Books
- Medical law, ethics and communication at a glance (Ed), 2016, Wiley Blackwell
- Identity, Personhood and the law, 2017, (with Jonathan Herring), Springer
- Depression: Law and ethics (Ed), 2017, OUP
- Human thriving and the law, 2018, (with Jonathan Herring), Springer
- The Screaming Sky, 2020, Little Toller, shortlisted for the Wainwright Prize
- Being a Human: Adventures in Forty Thousand Years of Consciousness, 2021, Profile Books
- The law as a moral agent: Making people good, 2016, (with Jonathan Herring), Springer
- Routledge Handbook of Global Health Rights (Ed) 2021, Routledge
- A Little Brown Sea; 2022, Fairacre
- Faiths lost and found (Ed), 2023, Darton Longman and Todd
- Cry of the Wild, 2023, Doubleday/Penguin
- Intuitively Rational: How we think and how we should, 2024 (with Andrew McGee), Springer
- Pets & their People, 2025,Bodleian Library Publishing
- Ethics, Law and the Business of Being Human: Against Nine to Five Philosophy, 2025, Anthem Press
- The Edges of the World, 2026, Doubleday
