= Gordon Thomas (author) =

British investigative journalist and author (1933–2017)

- Born: 21 February 1933; Carmarthan Wales, United Kingdom
- Died: 3 March 2017 (aged 84); Bath, Somerset, England, UK
- Education: Bedford Modern School
- Occupations: Investigative journalist, author
- Known for: Topics related to the CIA
- Spouse: Annie Nightingale (m.1962; div. 1969) Edith Kraner (m. 1970)
- Children: 5 Rachel (1953-2008) Alexander, Lucy, Nicholas and Natasha
- Relatives: Dylan Thomas (cousin)

Gordon Thomas (21 February 1933 – 3 March 2017) was a British investigative journalist and author, notably on topics of secret intelligence. Thomas was the author of 53 books published worldwide including The Pope's Jews, Secret Wars, and Gideon's Spies, with sales exceeding 45 million copies. Thomas got the scoop on the nationalisation of the Suez Canal for the Daily Express in 1956. He was a cousin of the poet Dylan Thomas.

== Biography ==
Thomas was born in Wales, in a cemetery keeper's cottage where his grandmother lived. He had his first story published at nine years old in a Boy's Own Paper competition. With his father in the RAF, he travelled widely and was educated at the Cairo High School, the Marist Brothers (in Port Elizabeth, South Africa) and, lastly, at Bedford Modern School. His first book, completed at the age of seventeen, is the story of a British spy in Russia during the Second World War, titled Descent Into Danger. He refused the offer of a job at a university in order to accompany a travelling fair for a year: he used those experiences for his novel, Bed of Nails. Since then his books were published worldwide. He was a foreign correspondent beginning with the Suez Crisis and ending with the first Gulf War. He was a BBC writer/producer for three flagship BBC programmes: Man Alive, Tomorrow's World and Horizon.

He was a regular contributor to the Japanese news magazine Facta and he lectured widely on the secret world of intelligence. He also provided expert analysis on intelligence for US and European television and radio programmes.

In 1998 he wrote and narrated a major documentary for Channel 4: The Spy Machine. It followed three years of research during which he was given access to Mossad's main personnel. The documentary was co-produced by Open Media and Israfilm. Two years later Thomas wrote Gideon's Spies: Mossad's Secret Warriors. As Thomas's "Notes on Sources" afterword to Gideon's Spies makes clear, the research for the film provided him with some, but not all, of the sources and material he used when writing his later book independently of Channel 4 and the film-makers. Gideon's Spies has so far been published in 16 languages. Sources for the book included Ari Ben-Menashe, a former Israeli intelligence agent, and Israeli spy Rafi Eitan. According to Charles Foster in Contemporary Review: "Writers who know their place are few and far between: fortunately Mr Thomas is one of them. By keeping to his place as a tremendous storyteller without a preacher's pretensions, he has put his book amongst the important chronicles of the state of Israel."

His 1974 book Voyage of the Damned was adapted for the 1976 film starring Faye Dunaway which won five Academy Award nominations. In 2020, playwright Tom Stoppard adapted for BBC Radio 4 Daniel Kehlmann's play based on the same book.

His final books were Shadow Warriors: Daring Missions of World War II by Women of the OSS and SOE and Defying Hitler: The Germans Who Resisted Nazi Rule. Both books were written with Greg Lewis. Defying Hitler was described as "A terrifying and timely account of resistance in the face of the greatest evils" by Alex Kershaw.

He died on 3 March 2017 at the age of 84 at the Royal United Hospital, Bath, Somerset, England.

== Personal life ==
Thomas was a cousin of the poet Dylan Thomas who helped him publish his first book. He was once married to broadcaster Annie Nightingale. He divided his time between his homes in Ireland and England, with his German born wife, an interior designer. His children work in various parts of the entertainment industry.

== Major awards ==
- International Television Award from the Festival de Télévision de Monte-Carlo
- Two Mark Twain Society Awards for Reporting Excellence
- Edgar Allan Poe Award for Shipwreck

== Selected bibliography ==
- Thomas, G.; Max Morgan-Witts (1969). The Day the World Ended (8 May 1902, eruption of Mount Pelée). Stein and Day. OCLC 881275313.
- Thomas, G.; Max Morgan-Witts (1974). Voyage of the Damned. Hodder & Stoughton. OCLC 1283075426.
- Thomas, G.; Witts, M. (1977). Enola Gay. Stein and Day. ISBN 978-0812821505.
- Thomas, G.; Witts, M. (1979). The Day the Bubble Burst: A Social History of the Wall Street Crash of 1929. Doubleday. ISBN 978-0385143707.
- Thomas, G. (1987). The Jesus Conspiracy: An Investigative Reporter's Look at an Extraordinary Life and Death. ISBN 0-8010-1194-9
- Thomas, G. (1989). Journey Into Madness: The True Story of Secret CIA Mind Control and Medical Abuse. Bantam Press. ISBN 0-553-05357-4.
- Thomas, G.; Martin Dillon (2003). The Assassination of Robert Maxwell. Robson Books. ISBN 978-1861056429.
- Thomas, G. (1999). Gideon's Spies: The Secret History of the Mossad. New York: St. Martin's Press. ISBN 0-312-25284-6.
- Thomas, G. (2001). Seeds of Fire: China and the Story Behind the Attack on America. Dandelion Books. ISBN 1-893302-54-7.
- Thomas, G. (2001). Cancer Doctor: The Biography of Josef Issels, M.D. Dandelion Books. ISBN 978-1893302181.
- Thomas, G. (2001). Seeds of Fire: China And The Story Behind The Attack On America. Dandelion Books. p. 524. ISBN 978-1893302549.
- Thomas, G. (2003). Robert Maxwell, Israel's Superspy. Da Capo Press. p. 474. ISBN 978-0786712953.
- Thomas, G. (2008). Secrets & Lies: A History of CIA Mind Control & Germ Warfare. JR Books. ISBN 978-1-906217-72-3.
- Thomas, G. (2009). Secret Wars: One Hundred Years of British Intelligence Inside MI5 and MI6. Thomas Dunne Books. p. 448. ISBN 978-0-312-37998-8.
- Thomas, G. (2012). The Pope's Jews: The Vatican's Secret Plan to Save Jews from the Nazis. Thomas Dunne Books. p. 336. ISBN 978-0312604219.

=== Book clubs ===
Thomas's works have appeared in:

- The Book of the Month Club
- The Literary Guild Book
- The Reader's Digest Book Club

=== Film adaptations ===
- Voyage of the Damned won five Academy Award nominations
- Enola Gay won the Emmy Awards Foreign Critics Prize
- Experiences won the Juries and Critics prize at the Monte-Carlo Film Festival

== See also ==
- William Francis Buckley
- Robert Maxwell, on whose life Thomas was an authoritative writer
- The Spy Machine
