= Alan Gratz =

American writer (born 1972)

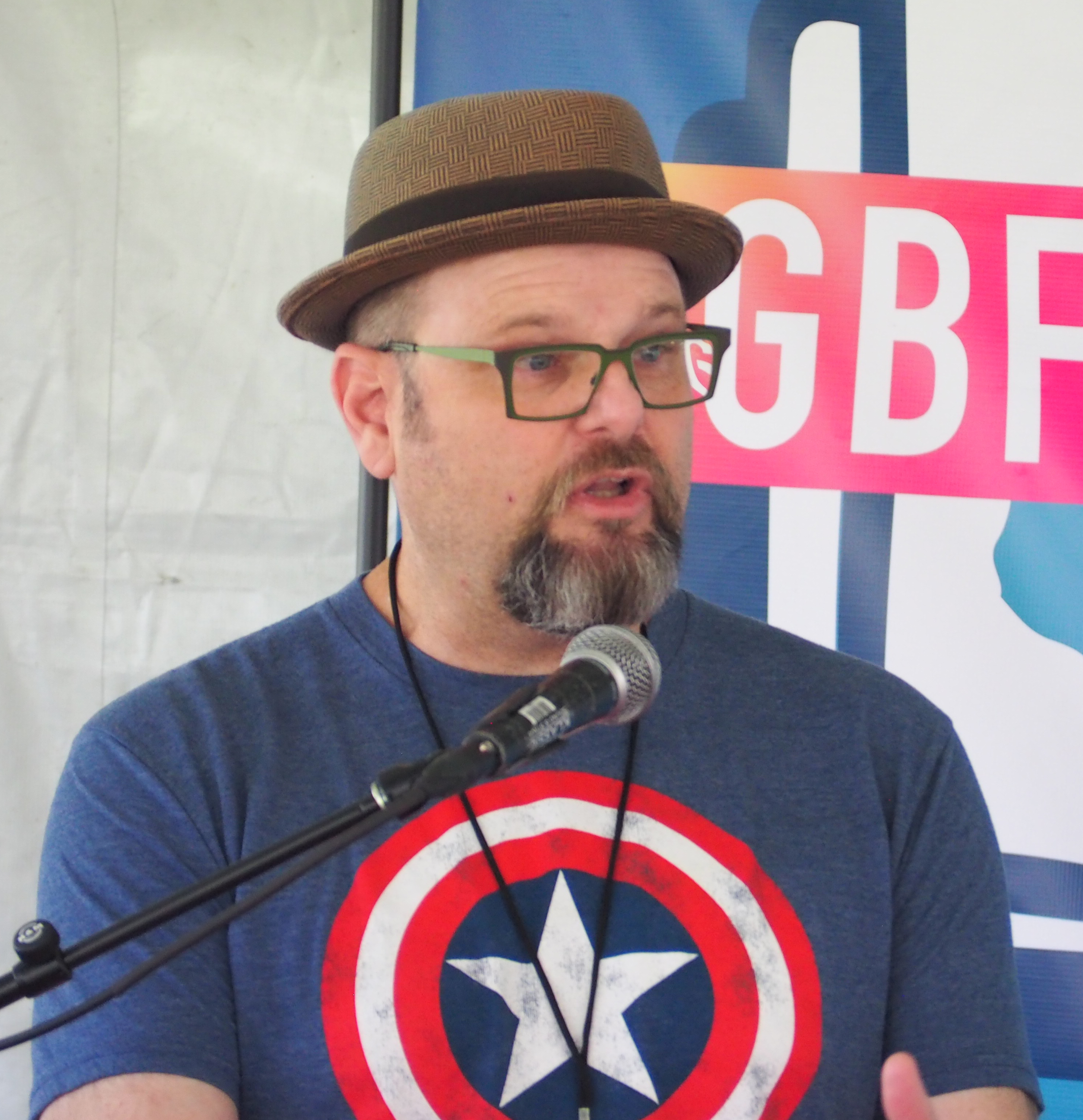
- Gratz in 2023
- Born: January 27, 1972 (age 54); Knoxville, Tennessee, U.S.
- Education: University of Tennessee (BA)
- Occupation: Author
- Spouse: Wendi Gratz
- Children: Jo Gratz
- Writing career
- Genres: Young Adult Fiction, Historical Fiction

Alan Michael Gratz (born January 27, 1972) is the author of 19 novels for young adults including Prisoner B-3087, Code of Honor, Grenade, Ground Zero, Refugee, Two Degrees, Projekt 1065 and Resist.

== Life ==
Alan Gratz was born in Knoxville, Tennessee. He holds a B.A. in creative writing and a master's degree in English education, both from the University of Tennessee, Knoxville. During his time at the university, he worked for the school's newspaper, the Daily Beacon.

Gratz currently lives in Portland, Oregon with his wife and daughter.

== Published works ==
- Samurai Shortstop (Dial Books, 2006)
- Something Rotten (Dial, 2007)
- The Brooklyn Nine: A Novel In Nine Innings (Dial, 2009)
- Fantasy Baseball (Dial, 2011)
- Starfleet Academy: The Assassination Game (Simon Spotlight, 2012)
- Prisoner B-3087 (Scholastic, 2013)
- The League of Seven (Tor Forge, 2014)
- The Dragon Lantern: A League of Seven Novel (Tor Forge, 2015)
- Code of Honor (2015)
- The Monster War: A League of Seven Novel (Tor Forge, 2016)
- Projekt 1065 (Scholastic, 2016)
- Ban This Book (Tor Forge, 2017)
- Refugee (Scholastic, 2017)
- Grenade (Scholastic, 2018)
- Allies (Scholastic, 2019)
- Resist (Scholastic, 2020)
- Ground Zero (Scholastic, 2021)
- Two Degrees (Scholastic, 2022)
- Captain America: The Ghost Army (Scholastic, 2023)
- Heroes (Scholastic, 2024)
- War Games (Scholastic, 2025)

== Produced plays ==
- The Legend of Sleepy Hollow (Knoxville Actors Co-op, 2004), adapted from the 1820 short story by Washington Irving
- Measured in Labor: The Coal Creek Project (Knoxville Actors Co-op, 2004)
- Young Hickory (Knoxville Actors Co-op, 1999)
- The Gift of the Magi (Knoxville Actors Co-op, 1999), adapted from the 1905 short story by O. Henry
- Indian Myths and Legends (Knoxville Actors Co-op, 1998)
- Sweet Sixteen (Knoxville Actors Co-op, 1998)

== Other writing credits ==
- Episodes of the A&E Network show City Confidential
  - Somerset, KY: A Killer Campaign (2004)
  - Lexington, KY: A Parting Shot (2004)
  - Seattle, WA: The Long Walk Home (2004)
  - Pikeville, KY: Kentucky Gothic (2005)
- The League of Seven Prequels
  - "Join, or Die: A League of Seven Short Story" Malaprop's Bookstore exclusive preorder Chapbook (2014)
  - "Hero of the Five Points" Tor.com exclusive short story (2014)

== Grants and awards ==
- Finalist, 2002 Marguerite de Angeli Contest (now known as the Delacorte Dell Yearling Contest for a First Middle-Grade Novel)
- Co-winner, 2003 Kimberly Colen Memorial Grant from SCBWI
- Winner of the 2017 National Jewish Book Award in the Young Adult Literature category for his book Refugee
- Winner of the 2018 Global Read Aloud in the Middle School/Junior High Choice category of his book Refugee.
- Winner of the 2019–2020 Young Hoosier Book Award (Middle Grades) for Refugee
- 2020 Buxtehude Bull for Refugee (German translation)
