= Max Morgan-Witts =

British producer, director and author

Max Morgan-Witts (born 27 September 1931) is a British producer, director and author of Canadian origin.

== Biography ==
Morgan-Witts was a Director/Producer at Granada TV which he joined on 9 January 1956. He directed television shows for Granada, including The Army Game, which was the UK's No. 1 television show during each of the approximately 50 episodes he directed. Afterwards Morgan-Witts directed 15 of the earliest episodes of Coronation Street (between July & August 1961 and January and April 1963), which followed The Army Game as Britain's top-rated TV show.

After Granada TV, Morgan-Witts moved to BBC TV, as a producer and executive producer in the Science & Features Department. He was editor and executive producer of Tomorrow's World, a live, weekly, popular science programme. He was responsible for 14 one-hour episodes of The British Empire, a historical documentary series. It was filmed in 40 countries and at the time was the most expensive and ambitious documentary series the BBC had made. He was Director and Producer of many one-hour film documentaries made for peak time viewing on BBC One, most of which he wrote himself but for one of which he hired Gordon Thomas. This was the beginning of their writing partnership.

Morgan-Witts wrote 10 non-fiction books with Thomas, four of which were made into feature films, including Enola Gay: The Men, the Mission, the Atomic Bomb, which was first a four-hour NBC special and then re-cut as a feature. Another was Voyage of the Damned, a highly rated feature film which is frequently repeated on TV worldwide.

Morgan-Witts has been awarded the Edgar Allan Poe Award and is a Knight of Mark Twain.

Now retired, Morgan-Witts and his wife, Pauline, live in London. They have two children, Paul and Michele, and four grandchildren.

== Bibliography ==
with Gordon Thomas

- The Day the World Ended (1969) – a factual novel about the eruption of Mount Pelée in 1902 and the basis for the 1980 film When Time Ran Out...
- The San Francisco Earthquake (1971)
- Shipwreck: The Strange Fate of the Morro Castle (1972)
- Voyage of the Damned (1974)
- Guernica: The Crucible of World War II (1975)
- Ruin from the Air: The Enola Gay's Atomic Mission to Hiroshima (1977)
- The Day the Bubble Burst: A Social History of the Wall Street Crash of 1929 (1979)
- Pontiff (1983)
- Anatomy of an Epidemic: The True Story of a Town, a Hotel, a Silent Killer, and a Medical Detection Team (1984)
- The Year of Armageddon: The Pope and the Bomb (1984)

== Sources ==
Source of information is from historic records and from the author's biographical notes
