= Bill Gold =

American graphic designer (1921–2018)

- Born: William Gold; January 3, 1921; Brooklyn, New York City, U.S.
- Died: May 20, 2018 (aged 97); Greenwich, Connecticut, U.S.
- Education: Pratt Institute
- Occupations: Graphic designer; film poster artist
- Years active: 1941–2003; 2011
- Spouses: Pearl Tamses (m. 1941, divorced); Susan Cornfield (m. 1989)
- Children: 2

William Gold (January 3, 1921 – May 20, 2018) was an American graphic designer best known for thousands of film poster designs. During his 70-year career, Gold worked with some of Hollywood's greatest filmmakers, including Laurence Olivier, Clint Eastwood, Alfred Hitchcock, Stanley Kubrick, Elia Kazan, and Ridley Scott. His first poster was for Yankee Doodle Dandy (1942), and his final work was for J. Edgar (2011). Among Gold's most famous posters are those for Casablanca, The Exorcist and The Sting.

== Early life ==
William Gold was born on January 3, 1921, in Brooklyn, the son of Rose (née Sachs) and Paul Gold. After graduating from Samuel J. Tilden High School, he won a scholarship and studied illustration and design at Pratt Institute in New York. In 1941, he married Pearl Damses. They had two children and later divorced.

== Early career ==
Gold began his professional design career in 1941, in the advertising department of Warner Bros. His first poster was for the James Cagney musical feature film Yankee Doodle Dandy in 1942, followed soon after by the poster for Casablanca. He was then drafted into the US Army where he was involved in the production of training films. Following his discharge in 1946, he resumed his career designing posters for Warner Bros. where he became head of poster design in 1947.

In 1959, his brother Charlie joined him in the business, and they formed BG Charles to do the film trailers. Charlie operated BG Charles in Los Angeles, while Bill operated in New York City. In 1987, Charlie left the business and retired to Vermont. Charlie Gold died at age 75 on December 25, 2003.

== Bill Gold Advertising ==
In 1962, following the dissolution of the Warner Bros. New York advertising unit, Gold created Bill Gold Advertising in New York City. In 1997, Bill moved the company to Stamford, Connecticut, and continued his business, producing posters for every film Clint Eastwood produced, directed, and/or acted in, among others. In 1994, Bill was awarded a Lifetime Achievement Award from The Hollywood Reporter. Richard Benjamin was the MC for the ceremony at the Directors Guild, and Clint Eastwood presented the award to Bill Gold on behalf of The Hollywood Reporter.

Bill Gold was a member of the Society of Illustrators, the Art Directors Club and the Academy of Motion Picture Arts and Sciences.

== Later life ==
In his later years, Gold resided in Old Greenwich, Connecticut. He married Susan Cornfield in 1989. He retired from his advertising business in 2003, but designed one last poster in 2011, for Eastwood's film J. Edgar. A limited-edition, oversized one-volume retrospective was published in January 2011 in coordination with his 90th birthday. He died from complications of Alzheimer's disease at Greenwich Hospital on May 20, 2018, at the age of 97.

== Film posters ==
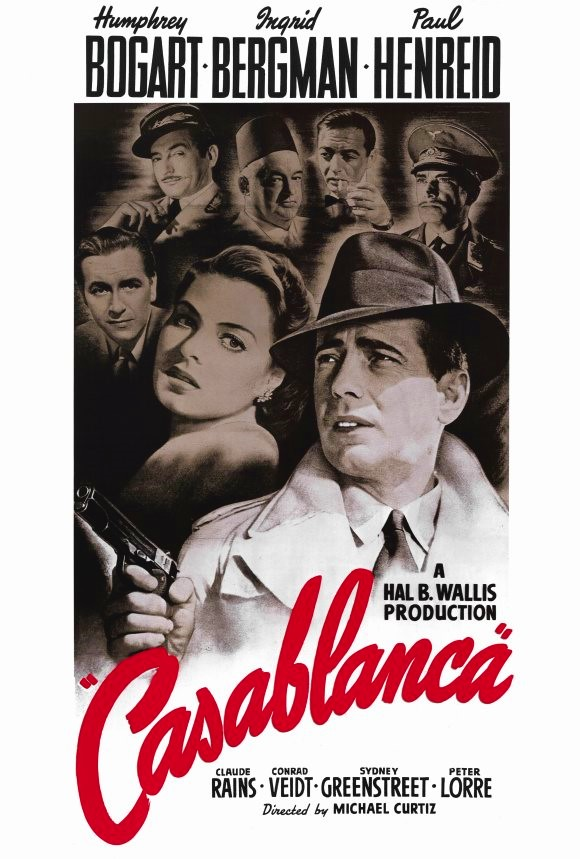
Gold's American theatrical release poster for Casablanca (1942)

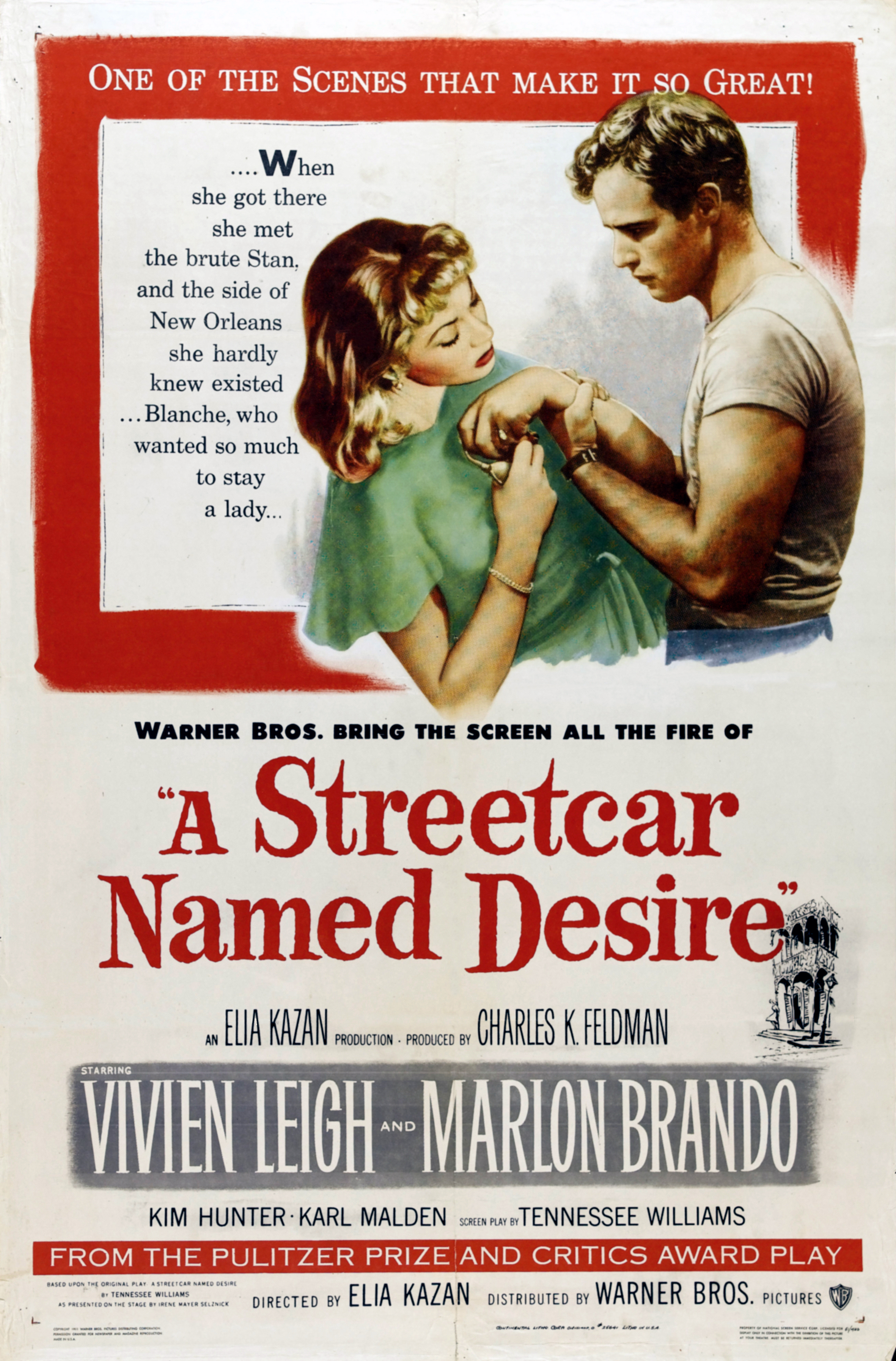
Gold's original theatrical release poster for A Streetcar Named Desire (1951)

After his first film project, Yankee Doodle Dandy, Gold collaborated with the American film industry's top film directors and film producers. Especially fruitful was Gold's relationship with the illustrator Bob Peak. Gold's work spanned eight decades and was involved in the creation of over 2,000 posters.

=== 1940s ===
- Yankee Doodle Dandy (1942)
- Casablanca (1942)
- Night and Day (1946)
- The Big Sleep (1946)
- Escape Me Never (1947)
- Winter Meeting (1948)
- Rope (1948)

=== 1950s ===
- Strangers on a Train (1951)
- A Streetcar Named Desire (1951)
- Dial M for Murder (1954)
- The Silver Chalice (1954)
- East of Eden (1955)
- Mister Roberts (1955)
- Baby Doll (1955)
- Giant (1956)
- The Lone Ranger (1956)
- Moby Dick (1956)
- The Searchers (1956)
- The Wrong Man (1956)
- A Face in the Crowd (1957)
- The James Dean Story (1957)
- The Pajama Game (1957)
- The Prince and the Showgirl (1957)
- Top Secret Affair (1957)
- The Old Man and the Sea (1958)

=== 1960s ===
- Splendor in the Grass (1961)
- Gypsy (1962)
- The Music Man (1962)
- My Fair Lady (1964)
- Robin and the 7 Hoods (1964)
- Sex and the Single Girl (1964)
- The Great Race (1965)
- Who's Afraid of Virginia Woolf? (1966)
- Bonnie and Clyde (1967)
- Camelot (1967)
- Cool Hand Luke (1967)
- The Fox (1967)
- Wait Until Dark (1967)
- Barbarella (1968)
- Bullitt (1968)
- Funny Girl (1968)
- A Dream of Kings (1969)
- The Illustrated Man (1969)
- The Wild Bunch (1969)

=== 1970s ===
- Last of the Mobile Hot Shots (1970)
- No Blade of Grass (1970)
- Ryan's Daughter (1970)
- Soldier Blue (1970)
- Start the Revolution Without Me (1970)
- The Go-Between (1970)
- There Was a Crooked Man... (1970)
- There's a Girl in My Soup (1970)
- Dorian Gray (1970)
- A Clockwork Orange (Typography, 1971)
- Woodstock (1970)
- Diamonds are Forever (1971)
- Fiddler on the Roof (1970)
- Get Carter (1970)
- Dirty Harry (1971)
- Klute (1971)
- McCabe & Mrs. Miller (1971)
- Medicine Ball Caravan (1971)
- Deliverance (1972)
- Jeremiah Johnson (1972)
- Joe Kidd (1972)
- The Life and Times of Judge Roy Bean (1972)
- Lady Sings the Blues (1972)
- The Trial of the Catonsville Nine (1972)
- What's Up, Doc? (1972)
- Day for Night (1973)
- The Exorcist (1973)
- High Plains Drifter (1973)
- Magnum Force (1973)
- O Lucky Man (1973)
- Oklahoma Crude (1973)
- Papillon (1973)
- Pat Garrett & Billy the Kid (1973)
- Scarecrow (1973)
- Steelyard Blues (1973)
- The Sting (1973)
- The Way We Were (1973)
- The Front Page (1974)
- Law and Disorder (1974)
- Mame (1974)
- 99 and 44/100% Dead (1974)
- The Odessa File (1974)
- The Sugarland Express (1974)
- The Yakuza (1974)
- Zandy's Bride (1974)
- Barry Lyndon (1975)
- Dog Day Afternoon (1975)
- The Drowning Pool (1975)
- Funny Lady (1975)
- Hard Times (1975)
- Mahogany (1975)
- Mister Quilp (1975)
- The Prisoner of Second Avenue (1975)
- Rafferty and the Gold Dust Twins (1975)
- Return of the Pink Panther (1975)
- Rooster Cogburn (1975)
- Rosebud (1975)
- The Great Waldo Pepper (1975)
- The Hindenburg (1975)
- The Wilby Conspiracy (1975)
- A Matter of Time (1976)
- A Star Is Born (1976)
- All the President's Men (1976)
- The Duchess and the Dirtwater Fox (1976)
- The Enforcer (1976)
- Fellini's Casanova (1976)
- Gable and Lombard (1976)
- Marathon Man (1976)
- The Outlaw Josey Wales (1976)
- Portnoy's Complaint (1976)
- The Ritz (1976)
- W.C. Fields and Me (1976)
- A Piece of the Action (1977)
- Exorcist II: The Heretic (1977)
- Fun with Dick and Jane (1977)
- Greased Lightning (1977)
- Julia (1977)
- Smokey and the Bandit (1977)
- The Gauntlet (1977)
- The Sentinel (1977)
- Twilight's Last Gleaming (1977)
- Bloodbrothers (1978)
- California Suite (1978)
- Convoy (1978)
- The Invasion of the Body Snatchers (1978)
- Movie Movie (1978)
- Same Time, Next Year (1978)
- Goin' Coconuts (1978)
- The Wiz (1978)
- Agatha (1979)
- Chapter Two (1979)
- Escape from Alcatraz (1979)
- The Great Santini (1979)
- Hair (1979)
- Scavenger Hunt (1979)
- The Bell Jar (1979)
- The Promise (1979)

=== 1980s ===
- Any Which Way You Can (1980)
- Bronco Billy (1980)
- The Dogs of War (1980)
- Fame (1980)
- Heaven's Gate (1980)
- The Jazz Singer (1980)
- The Last Married Couple in America (1980)
- Little Miss Marker (1980)
- The Long Riders (1980)
- The Nude Bomb (1980)
- Somewhere in Time (1980)
- The Stunt Man (1980)
- Those Lips, Those Eyes (1980)
- Clash of the Titans (1981)
- Endless Love (1981)
- For Your Eyes Only (1981)
- The Four Seasons (1981)
- Hard Country (1981)
- On Golden Pond (1981)
- The Funhouse (1981)
- Deathtrap (1982)
- Evil Under the Sun (1982)
- Firefox (1982)
- Honkytonk Man (1982)
- I, the Jury (1982)
- My Favorite Year (1982)
- Breathless (1983)
- Cross Creek (1983)
- Eddie Macon's Run (1983)
- Gorky Park (1983)
- High Road to China (1983)
- Never Say Never Again (1983)
- The Sting II (1983)
- Sudden Impact (1983)
- Champions (1984)
- City Heat (1984)
- Harry & Son (1984)
- Splash (1984)
- The River (1984)
- Tightrope (1984)
- Pale Rider (1985)
- Best Shot (1986)
- Heartbreak Ridge (1986)
- Platoon (1986)
- Hamburger Hill (1987)
- Orphans (1987)
- The Believers (1987)
- The Untouchables (1987)
- Bird (1988)
- Colors (1988)
- The Dead Pool (1988)
- Mississippi Burning (1988)
- Moonwalker (1988)
- The Accused (1988)
- Thelonious Monk: Straight, No Chaser (1988)
- Great Balls of Fire! (1989)
- Night Visitor (1989)
- Pink Cadillac (1989)

=== 1990s ===
- White Hunter Black Heart (1990)
- Reversal of Fortune (1990)
- Funny About Love (1990)
- State of Grace (1990)
- The Field (1990)
- The Rookie (1990)
- F/X2 (1991)
- Unforgiven (1992)
- In the Line of Fire (1993)
- A Perfect World (1993)
- The Bridges of Madison County (1995)
- The Stars Fell on Henrietta (1995)
- The Old Curiosity Shop (1995)
- Absolute Power (1997)
- True Crime (1999)

=== 2000s ===
- Space Cowboys (2000)
- Mystic River (2003)

=== 2010s ===
- J. Edgar (2011)

== Collaborating directors ==
- Clint Eastwood
- Alfred Hitchcock
- Stanley Kubrick
- Ridley Scott
- Sidney Lumet
- Elia Kazan
- John Schlesinger
- George Roy Hill
- Robert Altman
- William Friedkin
- Arthur Penn
- Miloš Forman
- Peter Yates
- Michael Curtiz
- Ron Howard
- Joshua Logan
- John Boorman
- Don Siegel
- Vincente Minnelli
- Alan J. Pakula
- Herbert Ross
- François Truffaut
- Buddy Van Horn
- Richard Benjamin

== Collaborating producers ==
- Clint Eastwood
- Jack L. Warner
- Hal B. Wallis
- Tennessee Williams
- Philip D'Antoni
- Tony Bill
- Stanley Kubrick
- Martin Bregman
- Samuel Z. Arkoff
- Walter Hill
- Ray Harryhausen
- Richard D. Zanuck
- Andrew Lazar
- Robert Lorenz
- Jay Presson Allen
- Tom Rooker
- David Valdes
- Bob Daley
- Jon Kilik

== Best Picture Winners ==
- Casablanca (1942)
- My Fair Lady (1964)
- The Sting (1973)
- Ordinary People (1980)
- Platoon (1986)
- Unforgiven (1992)
