= You'll Never Eat Lunch in This Town Again =

1991 memoir by Julia Phillips

- Front cover of the first edition (hardcover, Random House)
- Author: Julia Phillips
- Language: English
- Genre: Memoir
- Published: 1991
- Publisher: Random House
- Publication place: United States
- Pages: 573 (hardcover first edition)
- ISBN: 0394575741
- OCLC: 21524019
- Dewey Decimal: 791.43/0232/092 B 20
- LC Class: PN1998.3.P47 A3 1990

You'll Never Eat Lunch in This Town Again is a memoir by Julia Phillips, detailing her career as a film producer and disclosing the power games and debauchery of New Hollywood in the 1970s and 1980s. It was first published in 1991 and became an immediate cause célèbre and bestseller. The book was reissued in 2002 after the author's death, and a kindle edition was released in 2024.

== Background ==
In partnership with her husband Michael, Julia Phillips was one of the most successful film producers in Hollywood during the 1970s. Their second film, The Sting, grossed almost $160 million and won seven Academy Awards, making Julia the first woman to win an award for Best Picture. Their third film, Taxi Driver, brought them a second Oscar nomination and won the Palme d'Or in 1976. In 1977, they co-produced their most financially successful movie, Steven Spielberg's $300 million-grossing Close Encounters of the Third Kind.

However, Julia had long indulged in a self-destructive lifestyle of excessive drug consumption, and it had begun to affect her work. François Truffaut, one of French cinema's most iconic directors and a star of Close Encounters, blamed her for that film's budget difficulties, and she was eventually fired during post-production because of her cocaine dependence.

Phillips, by now divorced, spent the following years on a downward spiral which included, by her own account, spending $120,000 on cocaine, before entering therapy to recover from her addiction. Then, in 1988, having been out of Hollywood for eleven years, she sold all her assets to produce The Beat, about a child living in a difficult neighbourhood trying to teach poetry to local gangs. It was a critical and commercial disaster, grossing less than $5,000 at the box office, and Phillips turned to penning her scathing memoir to escape her financial difficulties.

== Synopsis ==
The book begins by briefly introducing the reader to Phillips in 1989, before quickly travelling back to her childhood in 1940s Brooklyn. It then covers her early life and first successes in the film industry: she and Michael earned $100,000 from their debut feature, Steelyard Blues, moved to Malibu, and had a daughter, Kate. The most notorious chapters follow as Phillips enjoys her greatest career successes, perhaps most infamously when she recalls the amalgam of drugs she was under the influence of on the night she won her Oscar ("a diet pill, a small amount of coke, two joints, six halves of Valium, and a glass and a half of wine"). She also reveals the personal peccadillos and vices of the biggest Hollywood A-listers of the day, including Steven Spielberg, Martin Scorsese, Richard Dreyfuss, Goldie Hawn, and David Geffen. Many of these people were pivotal figures in the emergence of New Hollywood in the 1960s and '70s, but Phillips disparagingly refers to them as "a rogues' gallery of nerds". Later episodes in her life, including freebasing, and her abusive relationship with a violent drug addict which caused her to miss her own mother's funeral, are also discussed candidly.

"No one ever claimed that [Phillips] had got Hollywood wrong in her book. In which case, you have to give a little more credence to the theory that Hollywood is prepared to let the club be run by raving egotists, indictable rascals, desperate addicts of one thing or several others, betrayers, connivers, hypocrites, and foul-mouthed swine. So long as they are guys."

— David Thomson, The Independent, 13 January 2002.

Most significant, from Phillips' own point of view, is her exposé of the "Boys' Club" in the higher echelons of Hollywood, where she claimed it was her gender that led to her ultimate ostracism. "If I had been a man, they would have closed ranks around me", she said, referring to her drug addiction. "They hated the woman thing. And I wasn't even regarded as a woman, I was a girl." Writing about her in The Independent in 2002, film critic David Thomson expressed Phillips' attitude as: "you [Hollywood] guys don't take women seriously; you like us around... [but] we aren't allowed to be players". Those same few men, like "Valley viper" Michael Ovitz who headed the Creative Artists Agency (CAA) were, in her eyes, responsible for a qualitative decline in standards and the increasing banality of movies since the 1970s.

== Reception ==
On its release, most critics agreed that the book was both scandalous and career-ending. (Even with a quarter of the 1,000-page original manuscript excised, it took lawyers at Random House fourteen months to approve it for publication) Lewis Cole, in The Nation, described it as being "[not] written but spat out, a breakneck, formless performance piece... propelled by spite and vanity". Newsweek's review called it a "573-page primal scream", while one Hollywood producer said it was "the longest suicide note in history". In the 2003 documentary version of Easy Riders, Raging Bulls, based on Peter Biskind's 1998 anecdotal history of New Hollywood, Richard Dreyfuss recalled his initial fury at Phillips' revelations, before more circumspectly listening to "a little voice inside my head [saying] 'Richard, Richard, the truth was so much worse'." Despite Phillips' criticisms of Steven Spielberg in the book, Spielberg nevertheless invited her to a 1997 screening of Close Encounters of the Third Kind as a way of "keeping his friends close and his enemies closer." Rapper Tupac Shakur misquotes the title of the book in a Vibe interview in 1996, stating briefly that it was one of the books he had read recently. "You’ll Never Work Again in Hollywood, whatever that is that they’re talking about, all the people that slept together."

After Phillips' death from cancer in 2002, the book was reissued in paperback by Faber and Faber, and gained renewed attention. Tim Appelo wrote in his Salon tribute that it was "mordant, merciless, [and] outdid Capote in shrieking truth to decadent power", while David Thomson of The Independent praised it as "compulsive, hilarious entertainment".

Phillips' memoir became an enormous commercial success, rapidly moving to the top of the New York Times Non Fiction Best Seller list and staying at No. 1 for thirteen weeks. Additionally, several prominent Los Angeles bookstore owners reported it to be the fastest-selling book they had ever seen. However, Phillips was excoriated by Hollywood, and the book's publication cost her the chance to adapt Anne Rice's Interview with a Vampire with David Geffen. Furthermore, in an example of life imitating art, pre-eminent Burbank restaurant Morton's fulfilled the book's titular prediction by declining her future patronage.

Shortly before her death, when asked if she had been too cruel in her writing, Phillips replied, "We all have our standards. People behaved in an ugly and despicable fashion towards me. I felt no constraints. Nothing I did in my book is as mean as any of the people I wrote about." She was similarly unrepentant about her subsequent expatriation, saying, "I wasn't a pariah because I was a drug-addicted, alcoholic, rotten person and not a good mother. I was a pariah because I hit them with a harsh, fluorescent light and rendered them as contemptible as they truly are."
