= Rafael Nazario =

Puerto Rican musician

Rafael Antonio Nazario
- Born: July 30, 1952 (age 74); Santurce, Puerto Rico
- Occupations: Pianist, composer, actor, author, chef
- Years active: 1976 - present

Rafael Antonio Nazario (also Raphael, or "Raf Nazario"; born July 30, 1952) is a Puerto Rican-born pianist, composer and arranger and actor. He has had a parallel career as chef, author and occasional wine writer.

Nazario's recordings range from Latin music to instrumental compositions, pop songs in English, classical-oriented piano and orchestral works. His debut album, Patria Añorada (1999, reissued 2004), contains songs in a variety of Hispanic-American styles and features lyrical and jazz-influenced arrangements. Nazario's music includes idioms and vernacular rooted in Puerto Rico's Jíbaro culture, evoking the nueva canción and nueva trova styles of Hispanic-American music.

== Early life and education ==
Nazario was born in the Santurce district of San Juan, Puerto Rico, the son of Elvira Piñeiro Prieto and Rafael Nazario Cardona, a newspaper pressman. Rafael Sr was the eldest of 18, and according to the family's oral history, their father, Francisco Nazario was one of the founders—along with Romualdo Real—of the Puerto Rico Ilustrado magazine, and later the newspaper El Mundo (Puerto Rico). His mother was of Spanish (Canarian), Portuguese and Dutch ancestry. His maternal grandfather, Amador Piñeiro, was one of the last train station superintendents on the island. Rafael Sr. moved the family to Costa Rica when Nazario was a few months old and years later settled in Jersey City, New Jersey, where Nazario attended St Aedens School. They returned to Puerto Rico when Nazario was nine years of age. He eventually studied at the De La Salle (Christian Brothers) School in the suburban city of Bayamón, where they lived. It was at La Salle that Nazario first became involved in theatre, under the direction of Luis J. Cruz.

Upon graduation from high school, Nazario left the island to study piano and music composition, living temporarily with his godparents in Miami, Florida. As he did not play an instrument and had never taken a music lesson, he did not win a place at any colleges he approached. However, an admission-board member at the University of Notre Dame admired the young man's initiative. Rev. Michael J. Heppen, C.S.C., invited Nazario to apply to the University of Portland, where Rev. Heppen was director of admissions. University of Portland's Dean of Music, Philippe de la Mare, was in France that summer, visiting his former teacher, Nadia Boulanger. In this manner, Nazario gained entry to the University of Portland School of Music even though his repertoire consisted of less than a minute of Beethoven's Sonata No. 14 (“Moonlight Sonata”).

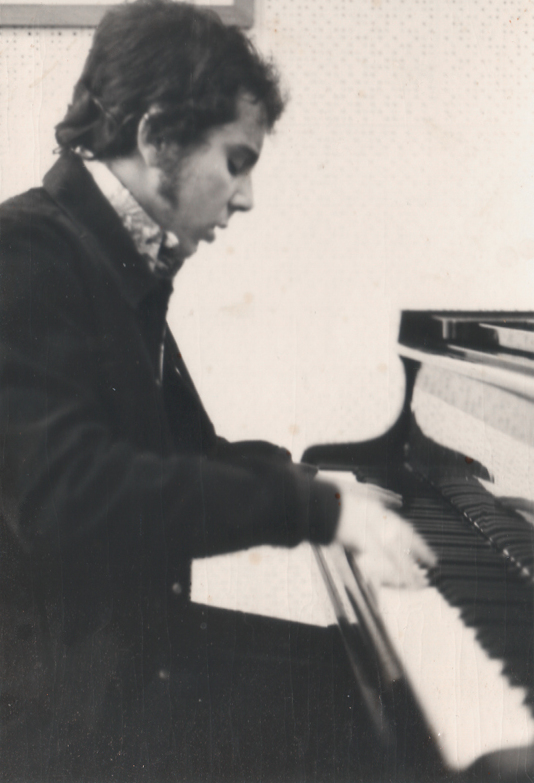
Rafael A. Nazario as student at the University of Portland

A classmate, Tim Gorman, already an experienced musician at 18, tutored Nazario. The pair soon became best friends. Nazario went on to spend his sophomore year of studies in Salzburg, Austria, where he attended University of Portland classes, as well as the Paris Lodron University. While in Salzburg, he became a member of the Salzburg Drama Gruppe, performing in plays directed by Ilse Lackenbauer. He returned to Portland to graduate, achieving a Bachelor of Music degree in the Composition program.

== Early career ==
After university and a number of odd jobs, he joined a Top-40 covers band and toured the US, playing mostly hotels. He eventually returned to Portland and enrolled in graduate school, supporting himself as waiter and sommelier. A brief stint as sommelier at the Benson Hotel led to Nazario being asked to join a new restaurant in ‘Old Town’, called "Fingers", after its founding chef, Fred Finger. Within a few months, the founding chef departed and Nazario took on the role of chef at the restaurant. The eatery coincidentally received its first positive newspaper review (Willamette Week; Karen Brooks, Gideon Bosker ) a few weeks later. "Fingers" restaurant was later renamed 'The Norton House', after the historic building (owned by Bill Naito) that housed it.

== Los Angeles ==
Nazario moved to Los Angeles with his then wife. He worked as waiter at Jean Leon’s La Scala-Malibu restaurant, but left after a few months. After a short spell as a singer–pianist in a cabaret night club, he worked as chef at Hugo's, in West Hollywood. Here, Nazario created the menu and format for what became an icon in the Los Angeles dining scene. Hugo's was one of the first of the gourmet take-out stores with a bistro-Euro-café restaurant setting.

Nazario left Hugo's after a couple of years to teach food and wine and later helmed Bono's (an Italian restaurant owned by Sonny Bono) on Melrose as guest chef for a short time. He also worked for singer-songwriter Jackson Browne as private chef during preparations for his "Lawyers in Love" album tour.

== 72 Market Street, Venice, CA ==
As a well-known chef, Nazario found it difficult to be taken seriously as a musician. After several months playing for free at the At My Place nightclub in Santa Monica, he played piano at a new restaurant in Venice 72 Market Street Oyster Bar and Grill — owned by Tony Bill (The Sting, Taxi Driver) along with several partners, including Dudley Moore. Nazario was the house pianist for six years, and the resident wine and spirits buyer for most of that period. According to LA Style magazine, he oversaw one of the city's best wine lists at the time.

Later, Nazario was to helm a trio for the live—if short-lived—KCRW broadcasts, as well as other NPR related events, and was involved in the 72 Market St. Lecture Series. Los Angeles Magazine included him among the city's top sommeliers in its "Best of L.A." article, while Caroline Bates noted his wine list and "sophisticated jazz piano" in a Gourmet Magazine review (Dec. 1987).

The clientele at 72 Market Street included a mix of celebrities and West Coast artists, literati and writers, alongside beachcombers and local denizens. During his Los Angeles years, Nazario lived on the fringes of fame. He designed the menu for Joni Mitchell's wedding reception (as consultant for Nucleus Nuance, whose owner, Bruce Veneiro was a mutual friend) and once spent an evening at the home of composer Ken Lauber teaching Bob Dylan how to play a Gershwin song.

During that period, Nazario also worked as a television and film actor.

== Japan ==
Nazario left Los Angeles for Tokyo, where he played jazz clubs in Roppongi and acted in Japanese television commercials. After almost two years, he returned to the States with his young family and took up cooking again professionally. He became friends with Thomas Keller then an emerging chef. Together they worked on a book project, Mastering The Modern Classics [unpublished]. In 1992, Nazario, Keller, and a mutual friend happened to be in Napa Valley together when while visiting Long Vineyards, Bob Long mentioned The French Laundry was for sale. They immediately drove over to view the premises, which Keller eventually grew into a world-renowned restaurant.

== Mexico ==
Nazario took a job as a chef in Portland, where once again, he became well known. This resulted in him relocating to Mexico for a restaurant venture: Cafe Caracoles. After a few months in Puerto Vallarta, he moved on to Daiquiri Dick's, a fine-dining restaurant on Los Muertos beach in Puerto Vallarta. Shortly after arriving in Mexico, Nazario began to write songs in Spanish. Just over a year later, he released his debut album Patria Añorada.

As executive chef, Nazario participated in Puerto Vallarta's International Festival Gourmet along with a number of other culinary events. He also appeared in US-based television programs and publications.

While living in Puerto Vallarta, Nazario wrote and designed a collection of his recipes, Sand in Your Shoes (2001), which gained the attention of the James Beard Foundation. In August 2004, he and his crew went to New York City to prepare a dinner of Mexican haute cuisine at the James Beard House.

== Australia ==
In 2005, Nazario moved to Australia to where he was the co-founder of Guzman y Gomez. He later went on to help launch Mad Mex Fresh Mexican Grill, another quick service restaurant along with consulting for several restaurants and Mexican QSRs in Australia and New Zealand.

== Return to music ==
In mid‑2009, Nazario left the culinary world to return to music. He resumed teaching piano, and his first student was Joanna Weinberg, singer, actress and musical theatre composer. He later produced and arranged Weinberg's ‘The Piano Diaries’.^{[28][29]} He also collaborated with Ms Weinberg on a song, ‘Don’t Give Up’, which featured in the movie, ‘Goddess’ (2013), which she wrote. During that time Nazario also directed theatre in Sydney (e.g., "Sure Thing"). At the same time, he also worked occasionally as an actor, mainly doing TVCs and the occasional program.

In 2013, Nazario formed a Latin jazz trio, 'Trio Sol'. Soon thereafter he was invited to play at the Thredbo Jazz Festival.^{[30]}

In 2014, he returned briefly to the culinary world when he was hired to overhaul the menus for the Melbourne‑based restaurant chain Salsas. Additional consulting followed, along with a guest appearance on Mexican cuisine at the Art Gallery of New South Wales with Maeve O’Meara, during the 2016 Diego Rivera and Frida Kahlo exhibition.

In recent years, Nazario has focused on writing, under the pen name Raphaël de Saav. His work appears on his Substack, “The Expatriate Files.”

== Discography ==
- Patria Añorada (2000, 2004—later re-released as 'Isla')
- PianoForte 1
- PianoForte 2
- Piano Solo
- Busco Otro Corazon
- Water Music: Celadon Rain 紫の雨
- Water Music (Murasaki) [紫の雨]
- Water Music, Mariposa Azul [青い蝶の雨]
- Helen (The "Hello" Song)
- The Titanics 1— "Hold the Ice" (with James Pagano)

== Filmography ==
Actor (9 credits)

2011 Wild Boys (Australian TV Series); Piano player - Episode #1.13

1995 Nowhere Man (TV Series); Motel Clerk - Turnabout

1990 Crazy People (Film); Taxi Driver

1990 Doogie Howser, M.D. (TV Series); Stage Manager - Greed Is Good (as Rafael Nazario)

1989 I, Madman (Film); Lyle, Hotel Clerk (as Rafael Nazario)

1989 Moonlighting (TV Series) Waiter #2 - Those Lips, Those Lies (as Rafael A. Nazario)

1988 The Bronx Zoo (TV Series): - Crossroads (1988) ... TV series (as Raf Nazario)

1988 St. Elsewhere (TV Series); Man at the Gallery - Curtains (as Rafael A. Nazario)

1983 Boogeyman II (Film) Harvey (as Raf Nazario)

== See also ==
- List of Puerto Ricans
