= Julia Phillips =

American film producer

- Phillips in 1991
- Born: Julia Miller; April 7, 1944; New York City, U.S.
- Died: January 1, 2002 (aged 57); West Hollywood, California, U.S.
- Occupations: Film producer, author
- Spouse: Michael Phillips (m. 1966–1974)
- Children: 1

Julia Phillips (née Miller; April 7, 1944 – January 1, 2002) was an American film producer and author. She co-produced with her husband Michael (and others) three prominent films of the 1970s—The Sting, Taxi Driver, and Close Encounters of the Third Kind—and was the first female producer to win an Academy Award for Best Picture, received for The Sting.

In 1991, Phillips published an infamous tell-all memoir of her years as a Hollywood producer, titled You'll Never Eat Lunch in This Town Again, which became a bestseller.

== Early life ==
Julia Miller was born on April 7, 1944 to a Polish-Jewish family in New York City, the daughter of Tanya and Adolph Miller. Her father was a chemical engineer who worked on the Manhattan Project; her mother was a writer who became addicted to prescription drugs. She grew up in Brooklyn; Great Neck, New York; and Milwaukee. In 1965, she received a bachelor's degree in political science from Mount Holyoke College, and in 1966, she married Michael Phillips. After school, she worked as book section editor at the Ladies' Home Journal and then as a story editor for Paramount Pictures. In 1971, she and her husband, who had been a securities analyst for two years, moved to California to produce Steelyard Blues with Jane Fonda and Donald Sutherland, released in 1973.

== Career ==
=== Film ===
In 1972, Phillips along with her husband Michael Phillips and producer Tony Bill commissioned David S. Ward to write the screenplay for The Sting, for $3,500. In 1973, The Sting won the Academy Award for Best Picture and made Phillips the first woman to win an Oscar as a producer (an award shared by Tony Bill and Michael Phillips). In 1977, Taxi Driver, produced by the Phillipses, was nominated for Best Picture after winning the Palme d'Or at the 1976 Cannes Film Festival. Close Encounters of the Third Kind, her third major film, was produced with Michael Phillips. François Truffaut, one of the film's stars, publicly criticized Phillips as incompetent, a charge she rejected, writing that she essentially nursed Truffaut through his self-created nightmare of implied hearing loss, sickness and chaos during the production. Phillips was also a notorious drug user (cocaine especially), which she chronicled in detail in her memoirs. The side-effects of cocaine addiction caused her to be fired from Close Encounters of the Third Kind during post-production. Periods of drug abuse, gratuitous spending and damaging boyfriends took their toll over the next few years.

Phillips's early work in a producing team with her husband continues to receive acclaim within the industry. Twenty-five years after its Oscar success, The Sting was inducted into the Producers Guild of America's Hall of Fame, granting each of its producers a Golden Laurel Award. In June 2007, Taxi Driver was ranked as the 52nd-best American feature film of all time by the American Film Institute. In December 2007, Close Encounters was deemed "culturally, historically, or aesthetically significant" by the United States Library of Congress and selected for preservation in the National Film Registry.

=== Publishing ===
In 1991, Phillips published You'll Never Eat Lunch in This Town Again about her experiences in Hollywood. The book topped the New York Times bestseller list, but its revelations about high-profile film personalities, Hollywood's drug culture, and casting couch sensibilities drew ire from many former colleagues. Her follow-up book, Driving Under the Affluence, was released in 1995. It was mostly an account of how the success of her first book changed her life. In 2000, she helped Matt Drudge write his Drudge Manifesto.

== Death ==
Phillips died from cancer at her home in West Hollywood, California, on January 1, 2002, at the age of 57, and was interred in the Hillside Memorial Park Cemetery in Culver City, California. She had one daughter, Kate Phillips-Wiczyk, who is married to Modi Wiczyk, co-founder of independent film and television studio Media Rights Capital.

== Filmography ==
She was a producer in all films unless otherwise noted.

=== Film ===
Year	Film	Credit	Notes
1973	Steelyard Blues		
1973	The Sting		
1976	Taxi Driver		
1976	The Big Bus	Executive producer	
1977	Close Encounters of the Third Kind		
1987	The Beat		
1988	The Boost	Executive producer	Uncredited
1991	Don't Tell Mom the Babysitter's Dead		Final film as a producer

As an actress

Year	Film	Role	Notes
1977	New York, New York	Woman Flirting with Jimmy	Uncredited
1977	Close Encounters of the Third Kind	UFO Watcher at Crescendo Summit	Uncredited

== See also ==
- List of Academy Award records
