= Dave Maurer =

Dave Maurer may refer to:

- Dave Maurer (American football) (1932–2011), American football player and coach
- Dave Maurer (baseball) (born 1975), Major League Baseball pitcher

== See also ==
- David W. Maurer, professor of linguistics
