= Leonard Harris (actor) =

Critic, author and actor

- Born: Leonard Jerome Harris; September 27, 1929; New York City, U.S.
- Died: August 28, 2011 (aged 81); Hartford, Connecticut, U.S.
- Occupations: Actor, critic, author
- Years active: 1967–1980
- Spouse: Mary Ann Wurth (m. 1961; div. 1973)
- Children: 2

Leonard Harris (September 27, 1929 – August 28, 2011) was an American actor, critic and author. Despite his short acting career, he is well-known for his roles as Senator Charles Palantine in Taxi Driver (1976) and the mayor in Hero at Large (1980).

== Early life and education ==
Leonard Jerome Harris was born in the Bronx, New York City, on September 27, 1929. He graduated from City College and served in the U.S. Army at Fort Dix during the Korean War.

== Career ==
Harris began his career writing obituaries and book reviews for the Hartford Courant in 1958. In 1966, he became a culture critic at WCBS-TV in New York City, a position he held until 1974. He had three novels published and worked as a television writer later in his career. He served on the Tony Award Nominating Committee in the later 1980s and early 1990s.

Harris also played the mayor in a 1980 romantic comedy, Hero at Large. His first novel, The Masada Plan, was called "gripping, fast-moving, expertly engineered" by the novelist Meyer Levin in The New York Times Book Review. A fourth novel was published posthumously.

== Personal life ==
In 1961, Harris married Mary Ann Wurth. They had two children, Sarah and David Harris. They divorced in 1973. He also had homes in Stanfordville, N.Y. and West Palm Beach, Fla.

== Death ==
Harris died on August 28, 2011, in Hartford, Connecticut, aged 81, from complications of pneumonia.

== Filmography ==
=== Film ===
Year	Title	Role	Notes
1976	Taxi Driver	Senator Charles Palantine	
1980	Hero at Large	Mayor	(final film role)

=== Television ===
Year	Title	Role	Notes
1967	Eye on Art	Narrator	Documentary series Episode: "The Walls Come Tumbling Down"
1973	What's My Line?	Himself	1 episode

== Bibliography ==
- Harris, Leonard (1976). The Masada Plan. Crown Publishers. ISBN 0517527995.
- Harris, Leonard (1978). Don't Be No Hero. Crown Publishers. ISBN 0517532506.
- Harris, Leonard (1981). The Hamptons. Wyndham Books. ISBN 0671610007.
- Harris, Leonard (2014). War Songs. Looking Good Press. ISBN 978-0-9914438-0-2.
