= Dan the Dude =

New York criminal and cafe owner

Dan Mulcahy
- Other names: Louis Harris; Dan the Dude
- Occupations: Saloon keeper, underworld fixer, gambler
- Known for: Owner of the Stag Cafe, confidant and fixer for out-of-town con men in New York's underworld
- Criminal charges: Gambling, underworld fixing, involvement in the murder of Charles Becker

Dan Mulcahy (fl. c. 1905–15), known by the pseudonyms Louis Harris and Dan the Dude, was a New York criminal and the longtime owner of the Stag Cafe at 28 West 28th Street, in the vice district of Satan's Circus. The cafe was a popular hangout for many of the criminals in New York's underworld. Dan was most noted as a fixer and confidant of numerous con men, many of whom came from out of town and used his establishment as their unofficial base. "In olden times [around 1910-1915] in Dan the Dude's place," it was said, "you could see a hundred con men there at once, and not one of them would be a native New Yorker."

According to David Maurer, a professor of linguistics who wrote a history of the American confidence man, the chief function of a "hangout" of this sort was to

provide protection to grifters who are in a strange town. There is usually a private back room in connection with the place where only established professionals and "right" people are encouraged to congregate, and from which the general public is excluded. In this connection, an old-timer recalls: "There were always thieves in Dan the Dude's scatter, but no suckers and no dicks. If a sucker came in and started to go into the big room, some gee would stop him and say, "This is a private club. Are you a member?" And if he went in to buy a drink, the beer glass would be about the size of a thimble and the whisky terrible. And the Mickey Finns were always ready for some punk grifting kid who thought he would crash the joint.

Maurer added that based on his correspondence and interviews with turn-of-the-century con men, Dan the Dude "was an unusually helpful fixer. He kept a large ledger in which a record of all touches was kept, as well as a list of promising prospects for all sorts of thievery and con rackets. Professionals in good standing were given information from this book whenever they needed it. So far as I have been able to determine, this was the only document of its kind ever kept by a fixer in a hangout."

In addition to his activities at the Stag Cafe, Dan was also involved in illegal gambling, and was later implicated in the 1912 murder trial of Charles Becker.

The Stag Cafe was purchased from Dan the Dude by Chick Tricker, a one-time leader of the Eastman Gang, who renamed it the Cafe Maryland. It later became the location of a gangland shooting referred to by Herbert Asbury as the "Ida the Goose" affair.

A fictional character named Dan the Dude, played by Arthur Stone in the 1928 silent film Me, Gangster, may have been loosely based on him, but prints of this film have been lost.
