= 72 Market Street Oyster Bar and Grill =

Defunct restaurant in Venice, California, U.S.

Coordinates: 33.988197°N 118.472983°W

- Interactive map of 72 Market Street Oyster Bar and Grill

Restaurant information
- Established: 1983; 43 years ago
- Closed: November 2000; 25 years ago
- Previous owners: Tony Bill and Dudley Moore
- Location: Los Angeles, California, U.S.

72 Market Street Oyster Bar and Grill was a popular Venice, California restaurant founded in 1983 and launched by Tony Bill and Dudley Moore. The small restaurant was a celebrity hot spot which received attention for its food as well as an in house radio talk show and lecture series. It closed in November 2000.

== History ==
The architects for the original restaurant were Michael Rotondi and Thom Mayne. Architectural renovations of the building at 72 Market Street began in 1983, and the restaurant opened its doors for business in August 1984. The concept for 72 Market Street originated in Bill and Moore's desire for a casual fine dining eatery in the beachside neighborhood where they both lived. 72 Market Street received critical praise for Leonard Schwartz's fare of traditional American “comfort food”. A cookbook detailing its recipes, which included portraits of its celebrity patrons and their involvement in the restaurant, was released in 1998.

A lectures series began in 1985, which featured guests including Spalding Gray, Bill Irwin, Russian poet Yevgeny Yevtushenko, John Hammond Jr., and sleight-of-hand artist Ricky Jay. 72 Market Street also partnered with The Paris Review to host an afternoon of readings by authors and poets whose work had been published in their literary review; it including readings by E. L. Doctorow, T. Coraghessan Boyle, Richard Ford, Tess Gallagher, and Raymond Carver.

In the late 1980s a live radio program (“Live from 72”) featuring musical entertainment was broadcast live from the restaurant on Sunday evenings on Santa Monica public radio station KCRW. Performers on the radio show included Dudley Moore and David Crosby. and featured a trio helmed by house pianist Rafael Nazario.

In a 2017 post on a Venice Beach community forum, Tony Bill was cited as saying that the restaurant will open in its original place following the closing of Nikkis. The same location has a release date of March.

== See also ==
- List of oyster bars
