= David W. Maurer =

American linguist and author (1906–1981)

- Born: April 12, 1906; New Philadelphia, Ohio, U.S.
- Died: June 11, 1981 (aged 75); Jeffersontown, Kentucky, U.S.
- Spouse: Barbara Elinore Starbuck
- Children: 1; Joanne Maurer Rhodes
- Writing career
- Notable work: The Big Con (1940)

David Warren "Doc" Maurer (April 12, 1906 – June 11, 1981) was a professor of linguistics at the University of Louisville from 1937 to 1972. He was an acknowledged expert in American slang, especially the lingo of grifters, pickpockets, forgers, safecrackers and other underworld characters. He wrote more than 200 journal articles, professional papers, and books in the field of linguistics.

Maurer's best-known book was The Big Con (1940), one of his few works written for general readers. It details early-20th-century American practitioners of confidence games, both "big cons" (also known as "long cons") and "short cons". It was based on knowledge Maurer obtained from interviewing hundreds of grifters and con artists. The book provided source material for the Academy Award-winning original screenplay by David S. Ward for The Sting (1973), but in Maurer's view, The Big Con was not properly credited. In 1974, he brought a $10-million copyright-infringement lawsuit against Ward and Universal Studios. The suit was settled out of court in 1976 for an estimated $600,000.

== Biography ==
Growing up in New Philadelphia, Ohio, Maurer was an outstanding student with a flair for language. He graduated first in his high school class in 1924. He then went to Ohio State University where he became an English major. One summer during college he took a job on a North Atlantic trawler fishing off the coast of New England, Nova Scotia, and Newfoundland. The experience resulted in his first published journal article, "Schoonerisms: Some Speech Peculiarities of the North-Atlantic Fishermen", and it enabled him to learn criminal argots "through meeting the rumrunners and smugglers who worked the coastlines of the Eastern United States."

In 1935, he earned a doctorate from Ohio State in Comparative Literature and was immediately hired as a professor in the university's English department.

In June 1937, he married Barbara Elinore Starbuck in Highland County, Ohio. They settled on a farm in Jeffersontown, a suburb of Louisville, Kentucky, where Maurer had begun teaching at the University of Louisville. He would teach there for more than 35 years, devoting much of his academic career to studying the language of criminals, drug addicts, moonshiners, and other marginalized subcultures.

Maurer was described by his former student Stuart Berg Flexner as "big, with large shoulders and strong arms and hands, a man who can help pull in a heavy fishing net in freezing weather or push a car out of a muddy backroad on the way to an illegal still." Maurer usually felt safe talking with underworld characters; however, he admitted he chose to not seek employment at Tulane University after he was warned that organized crime figures in New Orleans would not welcome being studied by him. Maurer began his linguistic research before portable tape recorders came into use, and so "he initially relied on his prodigious memory and extensive notes in shorthand." When he later used a tape recorder, he depended on his wife Barbara—particularly as his eyesight failed—to transcribe and type his notes. She was jokingly nicknamed "The Countess" or "Countess de Maurer".

In 1974, Maurer filed a $10 million ($65.3 million today) copyright infringement lawsuit against screenwriter David S. Ward and Universal Studios, charging that the Oscar-winning movie The Sting (1973) had substantially copied from The Big Con (1940) without paying Maurer or giving him proper credit. To buttress Maurer's claim, a gambling consultant for the film revealed that The Big Con was in use on the set. Also, a Universal-supplied publicity booklet for The Sting contained quoted excerpts from Maurer's book. The lawsuit was settled out of court in 1976. The exact amount was not disclosed; however, the Los Angeles Times reported that it was in the vicinity of $600,000 ($3.39 million today). Maurer reportedly received half the amount after attorney fees and expenses. Ward disputed the allegation of plagiarism, stating that The Big Con was just one of several historical references he used, and insisting that the entire screenplay was original.

In his last years, Maurer was plagued by health problems. A traffic collision in 1970 "severely limited his activity by unremitting pain and, ultimately, almost total blindness." His close friend and research assistant Allan Futrell said that Maurer was likely contemplating suicide for a number of months. It was posthumously discovered that he had been systematically burning all of his notes to protect his sources. On June 11, 1981, David Maurer died in a shed at his Jeffersontown home from a self-inflicted gunshot wound. He was 75.

== Works ==
=== The Big Con ===
The Big Con was Maurer's book with the most enduring popular appeal. Published in 1940, it was reissued in 1999 with Lucy Sante providing a glowing Introduction that also appeared, in slightly modified form, in The New York Review of Books and Salon. Sante wrote:

The Big Con may be the only one of Maurer's books that can be read for purely literary value, but whether or not this is owed to a natural ability otherwise repressed in the interest of science, it flies along as if it had written itself. The language on display certainly must have had something to do with it.... But the jovial demeanor, linguistic invention, and casual hyperbole of the grift establish a natural rhythm that ties accounts by retired con men, by police detectives, and by a linguist like Maurer all together into a common barstool chorus.

Sante emphasized how The Big Con is not a dry recitation of con artist tricks and slang words. Instead, the book tells stories with compelling characters, and it offers psychological insights, as illustrated in this excerpt about "the mark":

A confidence man prospers only because of the fundamental dishonesty of his victim. First, he inspires a firm belief in his own integrity. Second, he brings into play powerful and well-nigh irresistible forces to excite the cupidity of the mark. Then he allows the victim to make large sums of money by means of dealings which are explained to him as being dishonest—and hence a "sure thing". As the lust for large and easy profits is fanned into a hot flame, the mark puts all his scruples behind him. He closes out his bank account, liquidates his property, borrows from his friends, embezzles from his employer or his clients. In the mad frenzy of cheating someone else, he is unaware of the fact that he is the real victim, carefully selected and fatted for the kill.

The source material for The Big Con came from Maurer's correspondence, interviews, and informal chats with hundreds of underworld denizens during the 1930s. Among the con men he profiled were such colorful figures as Joseph "The Yellow Kid" Weil, Charles Gondorff, Dan the Dude, Limehouse Chappie, 102nd Street George, Fred the Florist, and the Big Alabama Kid. Maurer won the trust of grifters, who let him in on their language and methods.

In a chapter titled "The Big-Con Games", there is a lengthy section detailing "The Wire" (later demonstrated in The Sting). It was one of three types of big cons (along with "The Pay-Off" and "The Rag") that involved setting up a façade establishment known as a "big store", which in the case of "The Wire" was a fake off-track betting parlor filled with grifters posing as horse-race bettors. "The Wire" was an abbreviation for "wiretapping", from which the idea for the swindle was developed. The mark was told in confidence that there were certain disgruntled telegraph operators in the country who, given access to the right expensive equipment, knew how to "tap telegraph wires and obtain advance information on the results of a [horse] race, hold up these results until the race-fan had time to place a bet with a bookmaker, then advance the post-time and forward the results—with very happy consequences for the fan who had meanwhile bet on the winner." As with every flavor of con that Maurer elucidates, "The Wire" works by appealing to the mark's greed for dishonestly acquired money.

Sometimes, if the mark was not sufficiently enthusiastic, it would be necessary to utilize the "shut-out" (also demonstrated in The Sting). As Maurer describes it,

the mark goes to the window to make a bet, but is 'shut out' by members of the boost who are all betting huge sums of money. By the time the mark gets to the window, the announcer says, 'They're off,' and betting is closed. The mark hears the race called precisely as the con men had predicted, and resolves to get his bet down on the next race at all costs.

The "shut-out" was considered a method for "stepping up the larceny in the veins of a mark".

The Big Con ends with a 25-page glossary of con man lingo. Maurer published a scholarly enlargement of The Big Con in his 1974 book, The American Confidence Man.

=== Published books ===
- The Big Con: The Story of the Confidence Man and the Confidence Game (1st ed.). Bobbs-Merrill Company. 1940. LCCN 40032315.
- The Argot of the Racetrack. American Dialect Society. 1951. LCCN 52008820.
- Narcotics and Narcotic Addiction. Charles C. Thomas Publisher, Ltd. 1954. LCCN 53010953. – co-written with Victor H. Vogel.
- Whiz Mob: A Correlation of the Technical Argot of Pickpockets with Their Behavior Pattern. American Dialect Society. 1955. LCCN 56001443.
- The American Confidence Man. Charles C. Thomas Publisher, Ltd. 1974. ISBN 978-0398029760.
- Kentucky Moonshine. University Press of Kentucky. 1974. ISBN 978-0813143545. – co-written with Quinn Pearl. This book focuses on the craft of the moonshiners, their terminology and the patchwork of "wet" and "dry" counties in Kentucky.
- Language of the Underworld. University Press of Kentucky. 1981. ISBN 978-0813114057. – a collection of 20 articles by Maurer. This posthumously published volume, edited by Allan W. Futrell and Charles B. Wordell, includes a foreword by Stuart Berg Flexner describing Maurer's methods for researching criminal argot.

== See also ==
- Confidence tricks
- Dan the Dude
- The Sting
- There's a sucker born every minute
