= The Sting II =

1983 film by Jeremy Kagan

- Theatrical release poster
- Directed by: Jeremy Paul Kagan
- Written by: David S. Ward
- Produced by: Jennings Lang
- Starring: Jackie Gleason; Mac Davis; Teri Garr; Karl Malden; Oliver Reed; Ron Rifkin; John Hancock
- Cinematography: Bill Butler
- Edited by: David Garfield
- Music by: Lalo Schifrin
- Production company: Universal Studios
- Distributed by: Universal Studios
- Release dates: February 18, 1983 (Los Angeles & New York City)
- Running time: 102 minutes
- Country: United States
- Language: English
- Box office: $6.3 million

The Sting II is a 1983 American comedy film and a sequel to The Sting, again written by David S. Ward. It was directed by Jeremy Paul Kagan and stars Jackie Gleason, Mac Davis, Teri Garr, Karl Malden and Oliver Reed.

== Plot ==
In 1940, the Great Depression is over and World War II has just begun. Fargo Gondorff is released from prison and reassembles his cronies for another con, out to avenge the murder of his lifelong pal and fellow con artist Kid Colors. Gondorff's young protege Jake Hooker attempts to pull a scam on wealthy "Countess Veronique," who instead pulls one on him. She turns out to be a grifter herself named Veronica.

Coming up with a boxing con, Gondorff's goal is to sting both Lonnegan, the notorious banker and gangster who wants revenge from a previous con, and Gus Macalinski, a wealthy local racketeer. Gondorff believe one or both of them is behind Kid Colors' death.

Hooker pretends to be a boxer who is about to throw a big fight. Macalinski is not only hoodwinked into losing hundreds of thousands of dollars, but he is also talked into changing his original wager by Lonnegan. While one gangster takes care of the other, Gondorff and Hooker head for the train station with a bag full of money, tickets out of town, and a final twist from Veronica.

== Cast ==
- Jackie Gleason as Fargo Gondorff
- Mac Davis as Jake Hooker
- Teri Garr as Veronica
- Karl Malden as Gus Macalinski
- Oliver Reed as Doyle Lonnegan
- Ron Rifkin as Eddie
- Jose Perez as Carlos
- Val Avery as O'Malley
- Michael Alldredge as "Big Ohio"
- John Hancock as "Doc"
- Larry Hankin as "Handicap"
- Bert Remsen as "Kid Colors"
- Tim Rossovich as "Typhoon" Taylor
- Harry James as Band Leader
- Woodrow Parfrey as Georgie
- Max Wright as Floor Manager
- Benny Baker as Pyle
- Frances Bergen as Lady Dorsett
- Larry Bishop as Gellecher, Lonnegan's Second Guard
- Danny Dayton as Ring Announcer
- Tony Giorgio as Rossovich, Macalinski's Man
- Carl Gottlieb as Maitre d'
- Bob Minor as Savitt
- Francis X. McCarthy as Lonnegan's Thug #1

== Production ==
=== Continuity ===
This film's continuity with respect to the first movie is disputed:

- At the time of the film's release, Director Jeremy Paul Kagan claimed, "The Sting II is inspired by and is an expansion of the first Sting, rather than a continuation. The principal characters of Fargo Gondorff and Jake Hooker are based on two very famous real-life con men, and are totally different from the two characters in the original." Furthermore, the first names of the two lead characters have changed: Henry Gondorff has become Fargo Gondorff, and Johnny Hooker has become Jake Hooker.
- However, characters in this film make specific references to events in the first film (the entire plot is driven by Lonnegan's desire to avenge his losses to Gondorff and Hooker in the first film), which would indicate this film was meant to be a direct sequel.

=== Music ===
- "Heliotrope Bouquet," by Scott Joplin and Louis Chauvin
- "The Chrysanthemum," "A Breeze from Alabama," "Cleopha," "The Entertainer," "Bethena," by Scott Joplin

== Reception ==
=== Critical reviews ===
On the review aggregator website Rotten Tomatoes, 10% of 10 critics' reviews are positive, with an average rating of 4.3/10.

=== Awards ===
The film was nominated for an Academy Award for the Best Musical Score composed by Lalo Schifrin.

== Home media ==
The Sting II was released on DVD in 2004 by Universal. Blu-ray release by Kino Lorber in 2021.

== See also ==
- List of boxing films
