= Taxi Driver =

1976 film by Martin Scorsese

- Theatrical release poster by Guy Peellaert
- Directed by: Martin Scorsese
- Written by: Paul Schrader
- Produced by: Michael Phillips; Julia Phillips
- Starring: Robert De Niro; Jodie Foster; Albert Brooks; Harvey Keitel; Leonard Harris; Peter Boyle; Cybill Shepherd
- Cinematography: Michael Chapman
- Edited by: Marcia Lucas; Tom Rolf; Melvin Shapiro
- Music by: Bernard Herrmann
- Production companies: Bill/Phillips Productions; Italo-Judeo Productions
- Distributed by: Columbia Pictures
- Release date: February 8, 1976
- Running time: 114 minutes
- Country: United States
- Language: English
- Budget: $1.9 million
- Box office: $29 million

Taxi Driver is a 1976 American neo-noir psychological drama film directed by Martin Scorsese and written by Paul Schrader. Set in New York City in a time of urban decay following the Vietnam War, it stars Robert De Niro as taxi driver Travis Bickle, whose mental state deteriorates as he works nights in the city, eventually having a mental breakdown and becoming a vigilante. The film also features Jodie Foster, Cybill Shepherd, Harvey Keitel, Peter Boyle, Leonard Harris and Albert Brooks (in his first feature film role).

Filming began in summer 1975, with actors taking pay cuts to ensure that the project could be completed on its low budget of $1.9 million ($11.4 million in 2025). For the score, Bernard Herrmann composed what would be his final score. The music was finished mere hours before his death, and the film is dedicated to him.

Theatrically released by Columbia Pictures on February 8, 1976, the film was critically and commercially successful despite generating controversy for both its graphic violence in the film's climax, and for the casting of 12-year-old Foster as a child prostitute. The film received numerous accolades, including the Palme d'Or at the 1976 Cannes Film Festival and four nominations at the 49th Academy Awards, including Best Picture, Best Actor (for De Niro) and Best Supporting Actress (for Foster).

Although Taxi Driver generated further controversy for inspiring John Hinckley Jr.'s attempted assassination of President Ronald Reagan in 1981, the film has remained popular. It is considered one of the greatest films ever made, and one of the most culturally significant and inspirational of its time. In 2022, Sight & Sound named it the 29th-best film ever in its decennial critics' poll, and the 12th-greatest film of all time on its directors' poll, tied with Barry Lyndon. In 1994, the film was designated as "culturally, historically, or aesthetically" significant by the U.S. Library of Congress and was selected for preservation in the National Film Registry.

== Plot ==
In New York City, former Marine and Vietnam War veteran Travis Bickle takes a job as a night-shift taxi driver to cope with his chronic insomnia and loneliness, frequently visiting adult movie theaters on his breaks, and keeping a diary in which he consciously attempts to include aphorisms such as "you're only as healthy as you feel". He becomes disgusted with the crime and urban decay that he witnesses regularly in the city and dreams about getting "the scum off the streets", recording these dreams in his diary. His narration throughout the film is largely conveyed through voice-over excerpts from his diary, which reveal his deteriorating mental state and deepening alienation from society.

Travis becomes infatuated with Betsy, a campaign worker for Senator Charles Palantine, who is running for president. Travis enters the campaign office where she works and asks her to join him for coffee, to which she agrees. Betsy agrees to go on a second date with him, during which he takes her to an adult movie theater, which she leaves immediately. He attempts to reconcile with her, but fails. The rejection further deepens his isolation and contributes to his increasingly erratic behavior. Enraged, he storms into the campaign office where she works and berates her before being kicked out of the office.

Experiencing an existential crisis and seeing various acts of prostitution throughout the city, Travis confides in a fellow taxi driver, nicknamed Wizard, about his violent thoughts. However, Wizard dismisses them and assures him that he will be fine. Despite this reassurance, Travis remains emotionally unmoored, unable to articulate the depth of his psychological distress. To find an outlet for his rage, Travis follows an intense physical training regimen. He gets in contact with black market gun dealer Easy Andy and buys four handguns. At home, Travis practices drawing his new weapons, going as far as creating a quick-draw firearm hidden in one of the sleeves in his coat. He begins attending Palantine's rallies to scope out his security. He also writes a threatening letter to Palantine, further indicating his intent to act against him. One night, Travis shoots a man attempting to rob a convenience store run by his friend, leaving before the cops arrive as the convenience store owner proceeds to beat the non-responsive robber.

In his trips around the city, Travis regularly encounters Iris, a 12-year-old child prostitute. Tricking her pimp and abuser Sport into thinking that he wants to solicit her, Travis meets with her in private and tries to persuade her to stop prostituting herself.

Travis shaves his hair into a mohawk and attends a public rally where he plans to assassinate Palantine. However, Secret Service agents see Travis putting his hand inside his jacket and approach him, which escalates to a chase. Travis escapes pursuit and makes it back to his home undetected.

That evening, Travis drives to the brothel where Iris works to kill Sport. He enters the building and shoots Sport and one of Iris's clients, a mafioso. Travis is shot several times but manages to kill the two men. He fights with the bouncer, whom he manages to stab through the hand with his knife and kill with a gunshot to the head. Travis attempts to die by suicide, but has no bullets. Severely injured, he slumps on a couch next to a sobbing Iris. As the police respond to the scene, a delirious Travis mimics shooting himself in the head with his bloody finger.

Travis goes into a coma due to his injuries, but he is hailed by the press as a heroic vigilante who saved Iris and is not prosecuted for the homicides. He also receives a handwritten letter from Iris's parents in Pittsburgh, who thank him for saving their daughter, revealing that she's safe and attending school once more.

After recovering, Travis returns to work, where he encounters Betsy as a fare. Betsy tells him that she followed his story in the newspapers. Travis drops her off at her home but declines to take her money, driving off with a smile. He briefly becomes agitated after noticing something in his rearview mirror, but continues driving into the night.

== Cast ==
- Robert De Niro as Travis Bickle
- Jodie Foster as Iris Steensma
- Cybill Shepherd as Betsy
- Harvey Keitel as Matthew "Sport" Higgins
- Albert Brooks as Tom
- Victor Argo as Melio, Bodega Clerk
- Leonard Harris as Senator Charles Palantine
- Peter Boyle as Wizard
- Harry Northup as Doughboy
- Norman Matlock as Charlie T.

Director Martin Scorsese plays a dual cameo role, once in the background during Betsy's first appearance, and later as an unhinged passenger in Travis' taxi who intends to murder his unfaithful wife for cheating on him with a black man.

Actress Diahnne Abbott, who would go on to become Robert De Niro's wife in real life, plays an adult movie theater concession girl who rebuffs Travis' flirtatious advances.

== Production ==
=== Development ===
Martin Scorsese has stated that it was Brian De Palma who introduced him to Paul Schrader, and Taxi Driver arose from Scorsese's feeling that movies are like dreams or drug-induced reveries. He attempted to evoke within the viewer the feeling of being in a limbo state between sleeping and waking.

Scorsese cites Alfred Hitchcock's The Wrong Man (1956) and Jack Hazan's A Bigger Splash (1973) as inspirations for his camerawork in the movie.

Scorsese also noted that Jef Costello (a solitary hitman), portrayed by Alain Delon in Le Samouraï, inspired the creation of Travis Bickle. The role was, in fact, offered to Alain Delon, among many others.

Before Scorsese was hired, John Milius and Irvin Kershner were considered to helm the project. When writing the script, Schrader drew inspiration from the diaries of Arthur Bremer (who shot presidential candidate George Wallace in 1972), as well as the Harry Chapin song "Taxi", which is about an old girlfriend getting into a taxi. For the ending of the story, in which Bickle becomes a media hero, Schrader was inspired by Sara Jane Moore's attempted assassination of President Gerald Ford, which resulted in her being on the cover of Newsweek.

Schrader also used himself as inspiration. In a 1981 interview with Tom Snyder on The Tomorrow Show, he related his experience of living in New York City while battling chronic insomnia, which led him to frequent pornographic bookstores and theaters because they remained open all night. Following a divorce and a breakup with a live-in girlfriend, he spent a few weeks living in his car. After visiting a hospital for a stomach ulcer, Schrader wrote the screenplay for Taxi Driver in "under a fortnight". He stated, "In the hospital this image came to me of a taxi cab and I said, 'That's me: I'm this kid locked up in this yellow box floating in the sewer, who looks like he's surrounded by people when he's absolutely alone."

Schrader decided to make Bickle a Vietnam vet because the national trauma of the war seemed to blend perfectly with Bickle's paranoid psychosis, making his experiences after the war more intense and threatening. Two drafts were written in ten days. Pickpocket, a film by the French director Robert Bresson, was also cited as an influence.

In Scorsese on Scorsese, Scorsese mentions the religious symbolism in the story, comparing Bickle to a saint who wants to cleanse or purge both his mind and his body of weakness. Bickle attempts to kill himself near the end of the movie as a tribute to the samurai's "death with honor" principle.

Dustin Hoffman was offered the role of Travis Bickle but turned it down because he thought that Scorsese was "crazy". Al Pacino, Jason Miller, Jeff Bridges were also considered for Travis Bickle.

=== Pre-production ===
While preparing for his role as Bickle, Robert De Niro was filming Bernardo Bertolucci's 1900 in Italy. According to Boyle, he would "finish shooting on a Friday in Rome [...] get on a plane [...] [and] fly to New York". De Niro renewed his taxi driver's license (obtained some years earlier whilst a struggling actor) and, when on break, would pick up a taxi and drive around New York for a couple of weeks before returning to Rome to resume filming 1900.

Although De Niro had already starred in The Godfather Part II (1974), he was recognized only one time while driving a cab in New York City. De Niro apparently lost 35 pounds (16 kilograms) and was repeatedly listening to a taped reading of the diaries of criminal Arthur Bremer. When he had free time while shooting 1900, De Niro visited an army base in Northern Italy and tape-recorded soldiers from the Midwestern United States, whose accents he thought might be appropriate for Travis's character.

Scorsese brought in the film title designer Dan Perri to design the title sequence for Taxi Driver. Perri had been Scorsese's original choice to design the titles for Alice Doesn't Live Here Anymore in 1974, but Warner Bros. would not allow him to hire an unknown designer. By the time when Taxi Driver was going into production, Perri had established his reputation with his work on The Exorcist, and Scorsese was now able to hire him.

Perri created the opening titles for Taxi Driver using second unit footage that he color-treated through a process of film copying and slit-scan, resulting in a highly stylized graphic sequence that evoked the "underbelly" of New York City through lurid colors, glowing neon signs, distorted nocturnal images, and deep black levels. Perri went on to design the opening titles for a number of major films, including Star Wars (1977) and Raging Bull (1980).

=== Filming ===
Columbia Pictures gave Scorsese a budget of $1.3 million in April 1974. On a budget of only $1.9 million, various actors took pay cuts to bring the project to life. De Niro and Cybill Shepherd received $35,000 to make the film, while Scorsese was given $65,000. Overall, $200,000 of the budget was allocated to performers in the movie.

Taxi Driver was shot during a New York City summer heat wave and sanitation strike in 1975. The film ran into conflict with the Motion Picture Association of America (MPAA) due to its violence. Scorsese de-saturated the colors in the final shootout, which allowed the film to get an R rating. To capture the atmospheric scenes in Bickle's taxi, the sound technicians would get in the trunk while Scorsese and his cinematographer Michael Chapman would ensconce themselves on the back seat floor and use available light to shoot. Chapman admitted that the filming style was heavily influenced by New Wave filmmaker Jean-Luc Godard and his cinematographer Raoul Coutard, as the crew did not have the time nor money to do "traditional things".

When Bickle decides to assassinate Senator Palantine, he cuts his hair to a mohawk style. This detail was suggested by actor Victor Magnotta, a friend of Scorsese's who had a small role as a Secret Service agent and had served in Vietnam. Scorsese noted that Magnotta told them that, "in Saigon, if you saw a guy with his head shaved—like a little Mohawk—that usually meant that those people were ready to go into a certain Special Forces situation. You didn't even go near them. They were ready to kill."

Filming took place on New York City's West Side, at a time when the city was on the brink of bankruptcy. According to producer Michael Phillips, "The whole West Side was bombed out. There really were row after row of condemned buildings and that's what we used to build our sets [...] we didn't know we were documenting what looked like the dying gasp of New York."

The tracking was shot over the shootout scene, filmed in an actual apartment, and took three months of preparation. The production team had to cut through the ceiling to shoot it.

== Music ==
Taxi Driver: Original Soundtrack Recording

Soundtrack album by Bernard Herrmann
- Released: May 19, 1998
- Recorded: December 22 and 23, 1975
- Genres: Film score; soundtrack
- Length: 61:33
- Label: Arista
- Producers: Michael Phillips; Neely Plumb

Professional ratings
Review scores
Source	Rating
AllMusic	4.5/5 stars

Bernard Herrmann previously scored De Palma's Obsession, and De Palma introduced Herrmann to Scorsese. The music by Herrmann was his final score before his death on December 24, 1975, several hours after Herrmann completed the recording for the soundtrack, and the film is dedicated to his memory. Scorsese, a longtime admirer of Herrmann, had particularly wanted him to compose the score; Herrmann was his "first and only choice". Scorsese considered Herrmann's score of great importance to the success of the film: "It supplied the psychological basis throughout." The album The Silver Tongued Devil and I from Kris Kristofferson was used in the film, following Alice Doesn't Live Here Anymore (1974), in which Kristofferson played a supporting role. Jackson Browne's "Late for the Sky" is also featured.

== Controversies ==
=== Casting of Jodie Foster ===
Some critics showed concern over 12-year-old Foster's presence during the climactic shoot-out. Foster said that she was present during the setup and staging of the special effects used during the scene; the entire process was explained and demonstrated for her, step by step. Moreover, Foster said that she was fascinated and entertained by the behind-the-scenes preparation that went into the scene.

In addition, before being given the part, Foster was subjected to psychological testing, attending sessions with a UCLA psychiatrist, to ensure that she would not be emotionally scarred by her role, in accordance with California Labor Board requirements monitoring children's welfare on film sets.

Additional concerns surrounding Foster's age focused on the role that she played as Iris, a prostitute. Years later, she confessed how uncomfortable the treatment of her character was on set. Scorsese did not know how to approach different scenes with the actress. The director relied on Robert De Niro to deliver his directions to the young actress. Foster often expressed how De Niro, in that moment, became a mentor to her, stating that her acting career was highly influenced by the actor's advice during the filming of Taxi Driver.

=== John Hinckley Jr. ===
Taxi Driver formed part of the erotomanic delusional fantasy of John Hinckley Jr. that triggered his attempted assassination of President Ronald Reagan in 1981, an act for which he was found not guilty by reason of insanity. Hinckley stated that his actions were an attempt to impress Foster, on whom Hinckley was fixated, by mimicking Travis's mohawked appearance at the Palantine rally. His attorney concluded his defense by playing the movie for the jury. When Scorsese heard about Hinckley's motivation behind his assassination attempt, he briefly considered quitting filmmaking as the association brought a negative perception of the film.

=== MPAA rating ===
The climactic shootout was considered intensely graphic by the MPAA, who considered giving the film an X rating. The film was booed at the Cannes Film Festival for its graphic violence. To obtain an R rating, Scorsese had the colors desaturated, making the brightly colored blood less prominent. In subsequent interviews, Scorsese commented that he was pleased by the color change, and considered it an improvement on the original scene. However, in the special-edition DVD, Michael Chapman, the film's cinematographer, expresses regret about the decision and the fact that no print with the unmuted colors exists anymore, as the originals have since deteriorated.

== Themes and interpretations ==
Roger Ebert of the Chicago Sun-Times has written of the film's ending:

There has been much discussion about the ending, in which we see newspaper clippings about Travis's "heroism" of saving Iris, and then Betsy gets into his cab and seems to give him admiration instead of her earlier disgust. Is this a fantasy scene? Did Travis survive the shoot-out? Are we experiencing his dying thoughts? Can the sequence be accepted as literally true? [...] I am not sure there can be an answer to these questions. The end sequence plays like music, not drama: It completes the story on an emotional, not a literal, level. We end not on carnage but on redemption, which is the goal of so many of Scorsese's characters. They despise themselves, they live in sin, they occupy mean streets, but they want to be forgiven and admired.

James Berardinelli, in his review of the film for ReelViews, argues against the dream or fantasy interpretation, stating:

Scorsese and writer Paul Schrader append the perfect conclusion to Taxi Driver. Steeped in irony, the five-minute epilogue underscores the vagaries of fate. The media builds Bickle into a hero, when, had he been a little quicker drawing his gun against Senator Palantine, he would have been reviled as an assassin. As the film closes, the misanthrope has been embraced as the model citizen—someone who takes on pimps, drug dealers, and mobsters to save one little girl.

On the 1990 LaserDisc, DVD and Blu-ray, Scorsese acknowledges several critics' interpretation of the film's ending as Bickle's dying dream. He admits that the last scene of Bickle glancing at an unseen object implies that Bickle will fall into rage and recklessness in the future and that he is like "a ticking time bomb".

Writer Paul Schrader confirms this in his commentary on the 30th-anniversary DVD, stating that Travis "is not cured by the movie's end", and that "he's not going to be a hero next time". When asked on the website Reddit about the film's ending, Schrader said that it is not to be taken as a dream sequence but that he envisions it as returning to the beginning of the film, as if the last frame "could be spliced to the first frame, and the movie started all over again".

The film has also been associated with the 1970s wave of vigilante films, but it has also been set apart from them as a more reputable New Hollywood film. While it shares similarities with those films, it is not explicitly a vigilante film and does not belong to that particular wave of cinema.

The film can be seen as a spiritual successor to The Searchers, according to Roger Ebert. Both films focus on a solitary war veteran who tries to save a young girl who is resistant to his efforts. The main characters in both movies are portrayed as being disconnected from society and incapable of forming normal relationships with others. Although it is unclear whether Paul Schrader sought inspiration from The Searchers specifically, the similarities between the two films are evident.

The film has been labeled as "neo-noir" by some critics, while others have referred to it as an antihero film. When shown on television, the ending credits feature a black screen with a disclaimer mentioning that "the distinction between hero and villain is sometimes a matter of interpretation or misinterpretation of facts". This disclaimer was thought to have been added after the attempted assassination of Ronald Reagan in 1981, but, in fact, it had been mentioned in a review of the film as early as 1979. LA Weekly and Yardbarker list this movie as belonging to the vetsploitation subgenre.

== Reception ==
=== Box office ===
The film opened at the Coronet Theater in New York City and grossed a house record of $68,000 in its first week. It went on to gross $28.3 million in the United States, making it the 17th-highest-grossing film of 1976.

=== Critical response ===
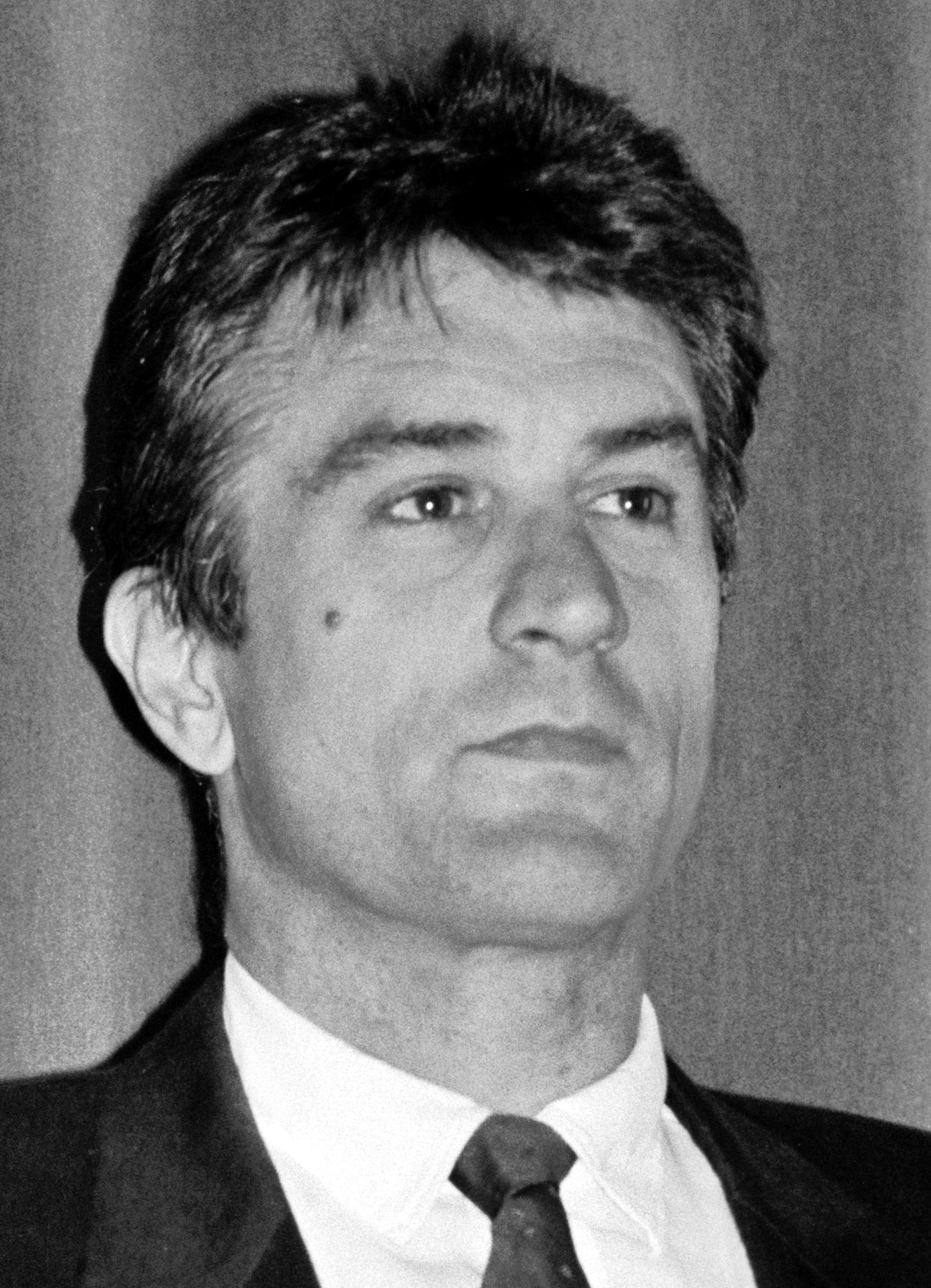
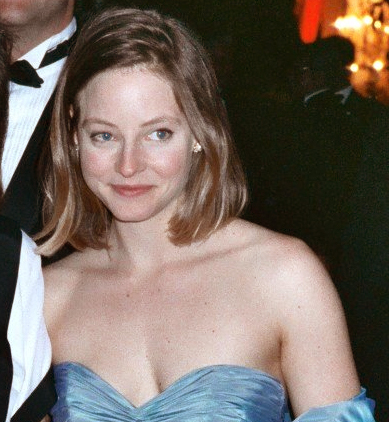
The performances of Robert De Niro and Jodie Foster garnered universal critical acclaim, earning them Academy Award nominations for Best Actor and Best Supporting Actress, respectively.

Taxi Driver received universal critical acclaim. Roger Ebert of the Chicago Sun-Times instantly praised it as one of the greatest films he had ever seen, claiming:

Taxi Driver is a hell, from the opening shot of a cab emerging from stygian clouds of steam to the climactic killing scene in which the camera finally looks straight down. Scorsese wanted to look away from Travis's rejection; we almost want to look away from his life. But he's there, all right, and he's suffering.

Writing for The New Yorker, Pauline Kael called it the "fevered story of an outsider in New York, a man who can't find any point of entry into human society" and describes it as "more feverish" than Mean Streets. Kael goes on to say that no other film "has ever dramatized urban indifference so powerfully".

On the review aggregator Rotten Tomatoes, the film holds an approval rating of 89% based on 163 reviews and an average rating of 9.5/10. The website's critical consensus reads, "A must-see film for movie lovers, this Martin Scorsese masterpiece is as hard-hitting as it is compelling, with Robert De Niro at his best." Metacritic gives the film a score of 94 out of 100, based on reviews from 23 critics, indicating "universal" acclaim".

Taxi Driver was ranked by the American Film Institute as the 52nd-greatest American film on its AFI's 100 Years...100 Movies (10th Anniversary Edition) list, and Bickle was voted the 30th-greatest villain in a poll by the same organization. The Village Voice ranked Taxi Driver at number 33 in its Top 250 "Best Films of the Century" list in 1999, based on a poll of critics. Empire also ranked him 18th in its "The 100 Greatest Movie Characters" poll, and the film ranks at 17 on the magazine's 2008 list of the 500 greatest movies of all time.

Time Out magazine conducted a poll of the 100 greatest movies set in New York City. Taxi Driver topped the list. In 2006, Schrader's screenplay was ranked the 43rd-greatest ever written by the Writers Guild of America. Taxi Driver was also ranked as the 44th best-directed film of all time by the Directors Guild of America. In contrast, Leonard Maltin gave a rating of 2 stars (out of 4) and called it a "gory, cold-blooded story of a sick man's lurid descent into violence" that was "ugly and unredeeming".

In 2012, in a Sight & Sound poll, Iranian filmmaker Asghar Farhadi selected Taxi Driver as one of his 10 best films of all time. Game designer Hideo Kojima named it as one of his four favorite films, though he noted his preferences shift over time.

The February 2020 issue of New York magazine lists Taxi Driver as among "The Best Movies That Lost Best Picture at the Oscars".

=== Accolades ===
Award	Category	Nominee(s)	Result	Ref.
Academy Awards	Best Picture	Michael Phillips and Julia Phillips	Nominated	
Academy Awards	Best Actor	Robert De Niro	Nominated	
Academy Awards	Best Supporting Actress	Jodie Foster	Nominated	
Academy Awards	Best Original Score	Bernard Herrmann (Note: Posthumous nomination.)	Nominated	
Blue Ribbon Awards	Best Foreign Film	Martin Scorsese	Won	
British Academy Film Awards	Best Film	Martin Scorsese	Nominated	
British Academy Film Awards	Best Direction	Martin Scorsese	Nominated	
British Academy Film Awards	Best Actor in a Leading Role	Robert De Niro	Nominated	
British Academy Film Awards	Best Actress in a Supporting Role	Jodie Foster (also for Bugsy Malone)	Won	
British Academy Film Awards	Most Promising Newcomer to Leading Film Roles	Jodie Foster (also for Bugsy Malone)	Won	
British Academy Film Awards	Best Film Editing	Marcia Lucas, Tom Rolf, and Melvin Shapiro	Nominated	
British Academy Film Awards	Anthony Asquith Award for Film Music	Bernard Herrmann (Note: Posthumous award.)	Won	
Cannes Film Festival	Palme d'Or	Martin Scorsese	Won	
David di Donatello Awards	Special David	Jodie Foster	Won	
David di Donatello Awards	Special David	Martin Scorsese	Won	
Directors Guild of America Awards	Outstanding Directorial Achievement in Motion Pictures	Martin Scorsese	Nominated	
Fotogramas de Plata	Best Foreign Movie Performer	Robert De Niro	Won	
Golden Globe Awards	Best Actor in a Motion Picture – Drama	Robert De Niro	Nominated	
Golden Globe Awards	Best Screenplay – Motion Picture	Paul Schrader	Nominated	
Grammy Awards	Album of Best Original Score Written for a Motion Picture or a Television Special	Bernard Herrmann (Note: Posthumous nomination)	Nominated	
Hochi Film Awards	Best Foreign Film	Martin Scorsese	Won	
Kansas City Film Critics Circle Awards	Best Supporting Actress	Jodie Foster	Won	
Kinema Junpo Awards	Best Foreign Language Film Director	Martin Scorsese	Won	
Los Angeles Film Critics Association Awards	Best Actor	Robert De Niro	Won	
Los Angeles Film Critics Association Awards	Best Music	Bernard Herrmann	Won	
Los Angeles Film Critics Association Awards	New Generation Award	Jodie Foster and Martin Scorsese	Won	
National Film Preservation Board	National Film Registry		Inducted	
National Society of Film Critics Awards	Best Film		2nd Place	
National Society of Film Critics Awards	Best Director	Martin Scorsese	Won	
National Society of Film Critics Awards	Best Actor	Robert De Niro	Won	
National Society of Film Critics Awards	Best Supporting Actor	Harvey Keitel	2nd Place	
National Society of Film Critics Awards	Best Supporting Actress	Jodie Foster	Won	
National Society of Film Critics Awards	Best Cinematography	Michael Chapman	3rd Place	
New York Film Critics Circle Awards	Best Director	Martin Scorsese	Runner-up	
New York Film Critics Circle Awards	Best Actor	Robert De Niro	Won	
New York Film Critics Circle Awards	Best Supporting Actor	Harvey Keitel	Runner-up	
New York Film Critics Circle Awards	Best Supporting Actress	Jodie Foster	Runner-up	
Online Film & Television Association Awards	Film Hall of Fame: Productions (1998)		Inducted	
Online Film & Television Association Awards	Film Hall of Fame: Characters (2021)	Travis Bickle (played by Robert De Niro)	Inducted	
Sant Jordi Awards	Best Performance in a Foreign Film	Robert De Niro	Won	
Turkish Film Critics Association Awards	Best Foreign Film		4th Place	
Writers Guild of America Awards	Best Drama – Written Directly for the Screen	Paul Schrader	Nominated	

=== American Film Institute ===
- AFI's 100 Years...100 Movies (1998) – #47
- AFI's 100 Years...100 Thrills (2001) – #22
- AFI's 100 Years...100 Heroes & Villains (2003)
  - Travis Bickle – #30 Villain
- AFI's 100 Years...100 Movie Quotes (2005)
  - "You talkin' to me?" – #10
- AFI's 100 Years of Film Scores (2005) – Nominated
- AFI's 100 Years...100 Movies (10th Anniversary Edition) (2007) – #52

=== Other honors ===
- National Film Registry – Inducted in 1994
- The film was chosen by Time as one of the 100 best films of all time.
- In 2015, Taxi Driver ranked 19th on BBC's "100 Greatest American Films" list, voted on by film critics from around the world.

== Legacy ==
Taxi Driver, American Gigolo, Light Sleeper and The Walker make up a series referred to variously as the "Man in a Room" or "Night Worker" films. Screenwriter Paul Schrader (who directed the latter three films) has said that he considers the central characters of the four films to be one character who has changed as he has aged. The film also influenced the Charles Winkler film You Talkin' to Me? In addition, a tie-in book was published.

Although Meryl Streep had not aspired to become a film actor, De Niro's performance in Taxi Driver had a profound impact on her. She said to herself, "That's the kind of actor I want to be when I grow up."

The 1994 portrayal of psychopath Albie Kinsella by Robert Carlyle in the British television series Cracker was in part inspired by Travis Bickle, and Carlyle's performance has frequently been compared to De Niro's as a result.

In the 2012 film Seven Psychopaths, psychotic Los Angeles actor Billy Bickle (Sam Rockwell) believes himself to be the illegitimate son of Travis Bickle.

The vigilante ending inspired Jacques Audiard for his 2015 Palme d'Or-winning film Dheepan. The French director based the eponymous Tamil Tiger character on the one played by Robert De Niro to make him a "real movie hero". The 2019 film Joker, directed by Todd Phillips, also draws inspiration from Taxi Driver.

=== "You talkin' to me?" ===
"You talkin' to me?"
- Character: Travis Bickle
- Actor: Robert De Niro
- First used in: Taxi Driver
- Voted #10 in AFI's 100 Movie Quotes poll

De Niro's "You talkin' to me?" segment has become a pop culture mainstay. In 2005, it was ranked number 10 on the American Film Institute's AFI's 100 Years...100 Movie Quotes.

In the relevant scene, the deranged Bickle is looking at himself in a mirror, imagining a confrontation that would give him a chance to draw his gun:

You talkin' to me? You talkin' to me? You talkin' to me? Then who the hell else are you talkin' to? You talkin' to me? Well I'm the only one here. Who the fuck do you think you're talking to?

While Scorsese said that he drew inspiration from John Huston's 1967 film Reflections in a Golden Eye, from a scene in which Marlon Brando's character is facing the mirror, screenwriter Paul Schrader said that De Niro improvised the dialogue, and that his performance was inspired by "an underground New York comedian" whom he had once seen, possibly including his signature line.

Roger Ebert of the Chicago Sun-Times said of the latter part of the phrase, "I'm the only one here", that it was "the truest line in the film. [...] Travis Bickle's desperate need to make some kind of contact somehow—to share or mimic the effortless social interaction he sees all around him, but does not participate in."

In his 2009 memoir, saxophonist Clarence Clemons said that De Niro explained the line's origins during the production of New York, New York (1977), with the actor seeing Bruce Springsteen say the line onstage at a concert. In the 2000 film The Adventures of Rocky and Bullwinkle, De Niro would repeat the monologue with some alterations in the role of the character Fearless Leader.

== Home media ==
The first "Collector's Edition" DVD, which was released in 1999, is packaged as a single-disc edition. It contains special features such as behind-the-scenes footage and several trailers, including one for Taxi Driver.

In 2006, a 30th-anniversary two-disc "Collector's Edition" DVD was released. The first disc contains the film, two audio commentaries (one by writer Schrader and one by Professor Robert Kolker) and trailers. This edition also includes some of the special features from the earlier release on the second disc, as well as some newly produced documentary material.

To commemorate the film's 35th anniversary, a Blu-ray was released on April 5, 2011. It includes the special features from the previous two-disc collector's edition, plus an audio commentary by Scorsese that was released in 1991 for the Criterion Collection, which was previously released on LaserDisc.

As part of the Blu-ray production, Sony gave the film a full 4K digital restoration, which includes scanning and cleaning the original negative (removing emulsion dirt and scratches). Colors were matched to director-approved prints under guidance from Scorsese and director of photography Michael Chapman.

An all-new, lossless DTS-HD Master Audio soundtrack in 5.1 surround sound was also created from the original stereo recordings by Scorsese's personal sound team. The restored print premiered in February 2011 at the Berlin Film Festival. To promote the Blu-ray release, Sony had the print screened at AMC Theatres across the United States on March 19 and 22.

== Possible sequel and remake ==
In late January 2005, De Niro and Scorsese announced a sequel. At a 25th-anniversary screening of Raging Bull, De Niro talked about the development of a story featuring an older Travis Bickle. In 2000, De Niro expressed interest in returning to the character in a conversation with Actors Studio host James Lipton. In November 2013, he revealed that Schrader had written a first draft, but both he and Scorsese thought that it was not good enough to proceed.

Schrader disputed this in a 2024 interview, saying, "Robert is the one who wanted to do that. He asked Marty and I. [...] So he pressed Marty on it and Marty asked me and I said, 'Marty, that's the worst fucking idea I've ever heard.' He said, 'Yeah, but you tell him. Let's have dinner.' So we had dinner at Bob's restaurant and Bob was talking about it. I said, 'Wow, that's the worst fucking idea I've ever heard. That character dies at the end of that movie or dies shortly thereafter. He's gone. Oh, but maybe there is a version of him that I could do. Maybe he became Ted Kaczynski and maybe he's in a cabin somewhere and just sitting there, making letter bombs. Now, that would be cool. That would be a nice Travis. He doesn't have a cab anymore. He just sits there [laughs] making letter bombs.' But Bob didn't cotton to that idea, either."

In 2010, Variety reported rumors that Lars von Trier, Scorsese and De Niro planned to work on a remake of the film with the same restrictions used in The Five Obstructions. However, in 2014, Paul Schrader said that the remake was not being made. He commented, "It was a terrible idea", and "in Marty's mind, it never was something that should be done".

== See also ==
- Martin Scorsese filmography
- 1976 in film
- List of cult films
- List of films featuring psychopaths and sociopaths
- List of films set in New York City
- Crime in New York City
- History of the United States (1964–1980)
  - History of New York City (1946–1977)

== Works cited ==
- Wilson, Michael (2011). Scorsese On Scorsese. Cahiers du Cinéma. ISBN 9782866427023.
