= Michael Phillips (producer) =

American film producer

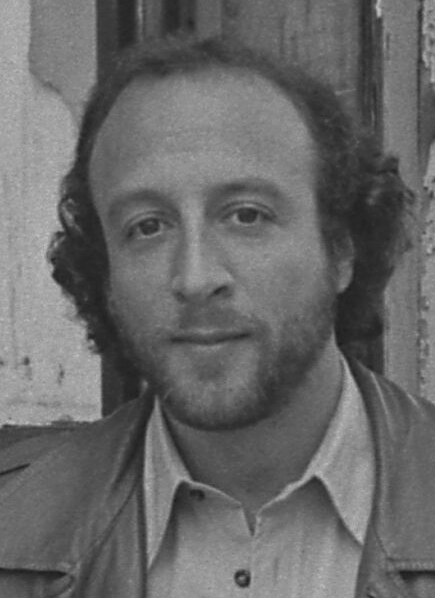
- Phillips in 1978
- Born: June 29, 1943 (age 83); Brooklyn, New York, U.S.
- Education: Dartmouth College (B.A.); New York University (J.D.)
- Spouses: Julia Phillips (m. 1966–1974) Liv Faret (m. 1980–1985) Juliana Maio (m. 1987)
- Children: 3
- Awards: Academy Award for Best Picture (1973); Palme d'Or (1976)

Michael Phillips (born June 29, 1943) is an American film producer.

== Early life and education ==
Phillips was born in Brooklyn and raised on Long Island. His mother, Shirley, was a schoolteacher and housewife; his father, Larry, was a garment manufacturer. They later became dealers in ancient Asian art. Phillips received a B.A. in history from Dartmouth College and a Juris Doctor from New York University School of Law. After being admitted to the New York Bar in 1969, he worked as a securities analyst on Wall Street. In 1971, he and his wife moved to Malibu, California and produced their first film, Steelyard Blues, starring Jane Fonda and Donald Sutherland.

== Career ==
In 1972, Phillips along with his then-wife, Julia Phillips, and producer Tony Bill financed the development of the screenplay, The Sting for $3,500 in total. In 1973, the film received the Academy Award for Best Picture. Michael and Julia were the first husband-and-wife team to win the Best Picture award. The couple then produced Taxi Driver (which would go on to win the Palme D'Or at the 1976 Cannes Film Festival) and Steven Spielberg's Close Encounters of the Third Kind.

In 1981, he bought out the film rights to the Foundation trilogy, with David S. Ward as the film's screenwriter, but it never came to fruition.

In 1984, his production company, Mercury Entertainment, went public with the intention to capitalize on his prior successes. Mercury planned to produce three to five films a year in the $10-million range with operating and development costs to be paid by ABC Motion Pictures while production financing was provided by the major studios. The 1984 film The Flamingo Kid and the 1991 film Don't Tell Mom the Babysitter's Dead were not as successful as hoped and in 1992, Philips offered to take the company private repurchasing outstanding stock at seven cents on the dollar. In 1986, he teamed up with Michael Douglas to launch a new company to produce independently financed features, and has option to buy Douglas' company Big Stick Inc. The partnership was dissolved in 1988.

The Sting was inducted into the Producers Guild of America's Hall of Fame, granting each of its producers a Golden Laurel Award. In June 2007, Taxi Driver was ranked as the 52nd-best American feature film of all time by the American Film Institute. In December 2007, Close Encounters was deemed "culturally, historically, or aesthetically significant" by the Library of Congress and selected for preservation in the National Film Registry.

== Personal life ==
Phillips is a Trustee Professor at Dodge College of Film and Media Arts, where he taught for several years.

He has been married to writer Juliana Maio since 1987 and has three daughters, Kate, Amanda, and Natasha.

== Select filmography ==
He was a producer in all films unless otherwise noted.

=== Film ===
Year	Film	Credit
1973	Steelyard Blues	
1973	The Sting	
1976	Taxi Driver	
1976	The Big Bus	Executive producer
1977	Close Encounters of the Third Kind	
1981	Heartbeeps	
1982	Cannery Row	
1984	The Flamingo Kid	
1991	Don't Tell Mom the Babysitter's Dead	Executive producer
1991	Eyes of an Angel	Executive producer
1992	Mom and Dad Save the World	
1997	Mimic	Executive producer
2001	Impostor	Executive producer
2007	The Last Mimzy	

As an actor

Year	Film	Role	Notes
1976	Taxi Driver	Political Rally Attendee	Uncredited

Thanks

Year	Film	Role
2017	David's Dinosaur	Very special thanks

=== Television ===
Year	Title	Credit	Notes
1989	The Flamingo Kid		Television pilot
1994	Jane's House	Executive producer	Television film
1994	The Companion		Television film
1995	Trailer Park	Co-executive producer	
2024	Earth Abides	Executive producer	

Thanks

Year	Title	Role
2012	Inside the Legend	Thanks
