= The Sting =

1973 caper film directed by George Roy Hill

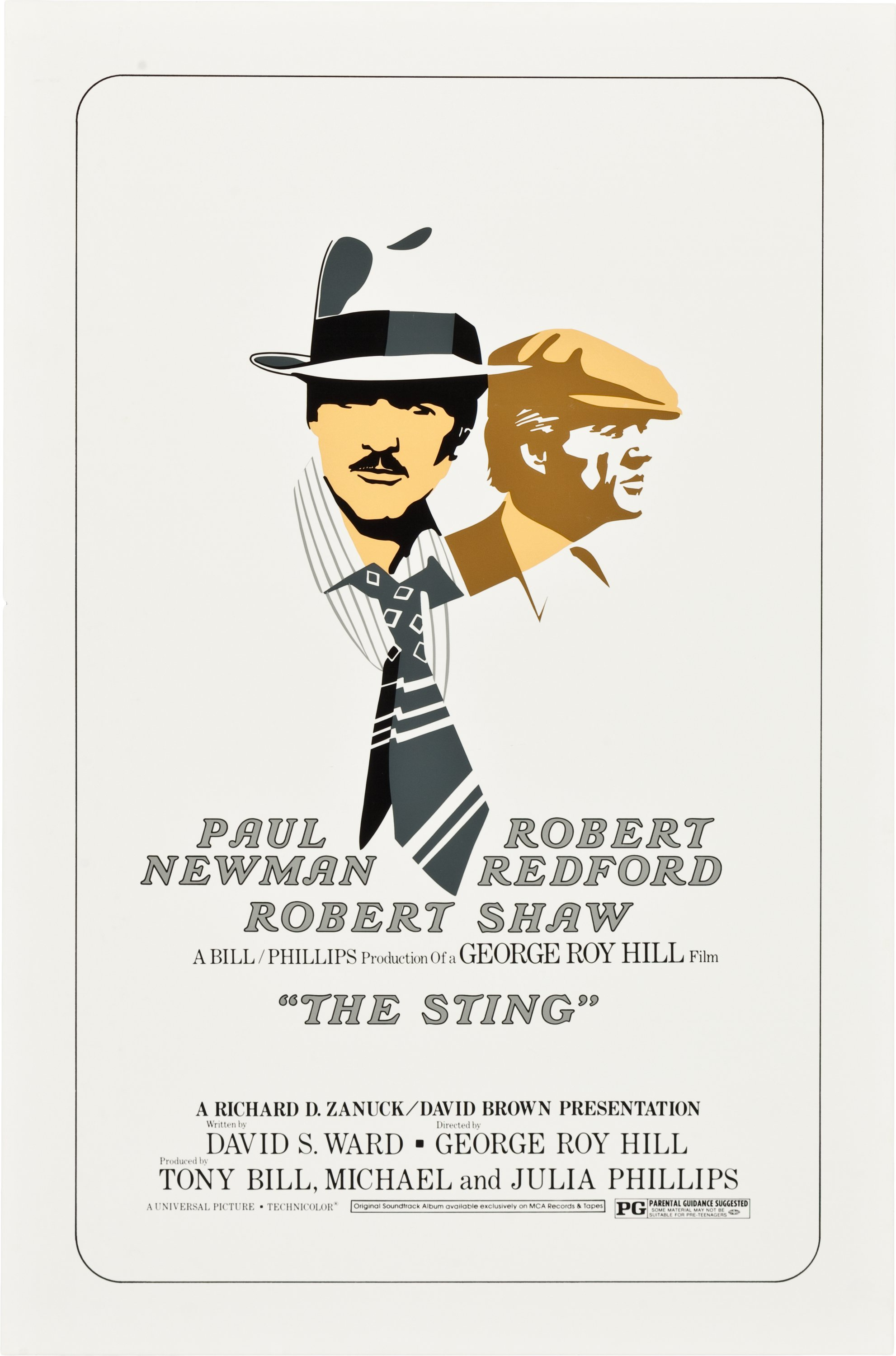
- Theatrical release poster (alternate design)
- Directed by: George Roy Hill
- Written by: David S. Ward
- Produced by: Tony Bill; Michael Phillips; Julia Phillips
- Starring: Paul Newman; Robert Redford; Robert Shaw
- Cinematography: Robert Surtees
- Edited by: William Reynolds
- Music by: Marvin Hamlisch
- Production companies: Universal Pictures; The Zanuck/Brown Company
- Distributed by: Universal Pictures
- Release date: December 25, 1973
- Running time: 129 minutes
- Country: United States
- Language: English
- Budget: $5.5 million
- Box office: $257 million

The Sting is a 1973 American caper film. Set in 1936, it involves a complicated plot by two professional grifters (Paul Newman and Robert Redford) to con a mob boss (Robert Shaw). The film was directed by George Roy Hill, who had directed Newman and Redford in Butch Cassidy and the Sundance Kid (1969). The screenplay by David S. Ward was inspired by real-life cons perpetrated by brothers Fred and Charley Gondorff and documented by David Maurer in his 1940 book The Big Con: The Story of the Confidence Man.

The film plays out in sections introduced by old-fashioned title cards, drawn by artist Jaroslav "Jerry" Gebr in a style reminiscent of The Saturday Evening Post. It is noted for its use of ragtime, particularly the melody "The Entertainer" by Scott Joplin, which was adapted (along with other Joplin pieces) for the film by Marvin Hamlisch, producing a Billboard-topping soundtrack and a top-10 single. The film's success created a resurgence of interest in Joplin's work.

Released on Christmas Day 1973, The Sting was a critical and commercial success and hugely successful at the 46th Academy Awards, where it won seven of its 10 Oscar nominations, including Best Picture, Best Director, Best Film Editing and Best Original Screenplay; Redford was also nominated for Best Actor. The film grossed $257 million worldwide and rekindled Newman's career after a series of big-screen flops. Regarded by the Writers Guild of America as having one of the best screenplays ever written, The Sting was selected in 2005 for preservation in the U.S. National Film Registry of the Library of Congress as being "culturally, historically, or aesthetically significant". A sequel film, also written by Ward, was released in 1983.

== Plot ==
In September 1936, amid the Great Depression, grifter Johnny Hooker and his partners, Luther Coleman and Joe Erie, con US$11,000 in cash (equivalent to $0.2 million in 2024) from a mark in Joliet, Illinois. Hooker loses his share of the con on a rigged roulette game, while Luther, buoyed by the windfall, retires. He gives Hooker his old Chicago friend, Henry Gondorff's contact to learn "the big con". Corrupt Joliet police lieutenant William Snyder confronts Hooker, revealing their mark was a courier for vicious Irish-American crime boss Doyle Lonnegan. Lonnegan's men murder Luther and the courier. Finding Luther dead, Hooker flees to Chicago.

Hooker finds Gondorff drunk and in hiding from the FBI, running a carousel fronting for a brothel, and proposes they take down Lonnegan. Initially reluctant, Gondorff relents, recruiting a team of experienced con men. They resurrect an elaborate, obsolete scam called "the wire", using a large crew to create a phony off-track betting parlor. Snyder and Lonnegan's men track Hooker to Chicago; Gondorff warns Hooker that if either finds him, the con will have to be called off.

Aboard the opulent 20th Century Limited Gondorff, posing as the boorish Chicago bookie "Shaw", buys into Lonnegan's private, high-stakes poker game, facilitated by the train's conductor, in which Lonnegan is known to cheat. "Shaw" infuriates Lonnegan with his obnoxious behavior, then out-cheats him out of $15,000 (equivalent to $0.3 million in 2024), which Lonnegan cannot pay because "Shaw" had previously had a pickpocket steal his wallet stuffed with cash.

Hooker, posing as "Shaw's" disgruntled employee "Kelly", is sent to collect the winnings and convince Lonnegan to help him take over "Shaw's" operation – a tactic Lonnegan has used repeatedly to build his crime empire. Hooker returns home to find Lonnegan's men waiting to assassinate him, but he avoids them. Their attempt spooks Gondorff, but Hooker convinces him to keep the con alive.

Lonnegan, frustrated with his men's inability to kill Hooker for the Joliet con – and unaware that "Kelly" is Hooker – orders the job to be given to Salino, his best assassin. A mysterious figure, wearing black leather gloves, follows and observes Hooker. Meanwhile, Snyder's pursuit of him attracts the attention of undercover FBI agents led by Agent Polk, who orders Snyder to bring Hooker in to entrap Gondorff.

"Kelly" gives Lonnegan a tip on a 7-to-1 long shot in a horse race that pays off. When Lonnegan presses him for details, he reveals he has a partner, "Les Harmon" (actually con man Kid Twist), in the Chicago Western Union office, who will help them topple "Shaw" by winning bets he books on horse races through past-posting. After seeing the trifecta of another race, Lonnegan agrees to finance a $500,000 bet (equivalent to $8.9 million in 2024) to break "Shaw" in revenge. Shortly thereafter, Snyder brings Hooker to Polk, who forces him to betray Gondorff by threatening to jail Luther Coleman's widow.

Despondent the night before the sting, Hooker sleeps with diner waitress Loretta. The next morning, as she walks toward him in an alley, a black-gloved man appears and shoots her dead before she can shoot Hooker. He reveals Gondorff hired him to protect him, and that the waitress was, in fact, Salino.

After "Harmon" telephones directions to "Place it on Lucky Dan", Lonnegan bets $500,000 at "Shaw's" on Lucky Dan to win. As the race begins, "Harmon" arrives and expresses shock at Lonnegan's bet: when he said "place it", he meant the horse would "place" (i.e., finish second). In a panic, Lonnegan rushes to the teller window, demanding his money back, at which point Polk, Snyder, and a half-dozen FBI agents storm the parlor. Polk tells Hooker he is free to go. Shocked at the betrayal, Gondorff shoots Hooker. Polk shoots Gondorff and orders Snyder to shield the ostensibly respectable Lonnegan from the crime scene.

With Lonnegan and Snyder safely away, Hooker and Gondorff rise ("bleeding" only from fake bullets) amid cheers and laughter. "Polk" is actually fellow con man Hickey, who has been posing with his "FBI agents" to divert Snyder and ensure that Lonnegan abandoned the money without ever realizing he was taken. As the men strip the room, Hooker refuses his share, claiming he would lose it anyway, and walks away with Gondorff.

== Cast ==
- Paul Newman as Henry Gondorff
- Robert Redford as Johnny Hooker
- Robert Shaw as Doyle Lonnegan
- Charles Durning as Lt. William Snyder
- Ray Walston as J. J. Singleton
- Eileen Brennan as Billie
- Harold Gould as Kid Twist
- John Heffernan as Eddie Niles
- Dana Elcar as FBI Agent Polk
- Jack Kehoe as Erie Kid
- Dimitra Arliss as Loretta (Salino)
- Robert Earl Jones as Luther Coleman
- James J. Sloyan as Mottola
- Charles Dierkop as Floyd
- Lee Paul as Lonnegan's second bodyguard
- Sally Kirkland as Crystal
- Avon Long as Benny Garfield
- Arch Johnson as Combs
- Ed Bakey as Granger
- Brad Sullivan as Cole
- John Quade as Riley
- Larry D. Mann as Clemens
- Leonard Barr as Leonard
- Paulene Myers as Alva Coleman
- Joe Tornatore as Black Gloved Gunman
- Jack Collins as Duke Boudreau
- Tom Spratley as Curly Jackson
- Kenneth O'Brien as Greer
- Ken Sansom as Western Union Executive
- Ta-Tanisha as Louise
- William Benedict as Jimmy

== Production ==
=== Writing ===
Screenwriter David S. Ward has said in an interview that he was inspired to write The Sting while researching pickpockets: "Since I had never seen a film about a confidence man before, I said I gotta do this." Daniel Eagan said: "One key to plots about con men is that film goers want to feel they are in on the trick. They don't have to know how a scheme works, and they don't mind a twist or two, but it's important for the story to feature clearly recognizable 'good' and 'bad' characters." It took Ward a year to fine-tune this aspect of the script and to determine how much information he could withhold from the audience while still making the leads sympathetic. He also imagined an underground brotherhood of thieves who assemble for a big operation and then melt away afterward.

Years later, director Rob Cohen recounted how he found the script in the slush pile when working as a reader for Mike Medavoy, a future studio head, but then an agent. He wrote in his coverage that it was "the great American screenplay and … will make an award-winning, major-cast, major-director film." Medavoy said that he would try to sell it on that recommendation, promising to fire Cohen if he could not. Universal bought it that afternoon, and Cohen keeps the coverage framed on the wall of his office.

Academic David Maurer sued for plagiarism, claiming the screenplay was based too heavily on his 1940 book The Big Con, about real-life tricksters Fred and Charley Gondorff. Universal settled out of court for $600,000, irking Ward, who resented the presumption of guilt implied by an out-of-court settlement done for business expediency.

Writer/producer Roy Huggins maintained in his Archive of American Television interview that the first half of The Sting plagiarized the 1958 Maverick television series episode "Shady Deal at Sunny Acres", starring James Garner and Jack Kelly.

=== Casting ===
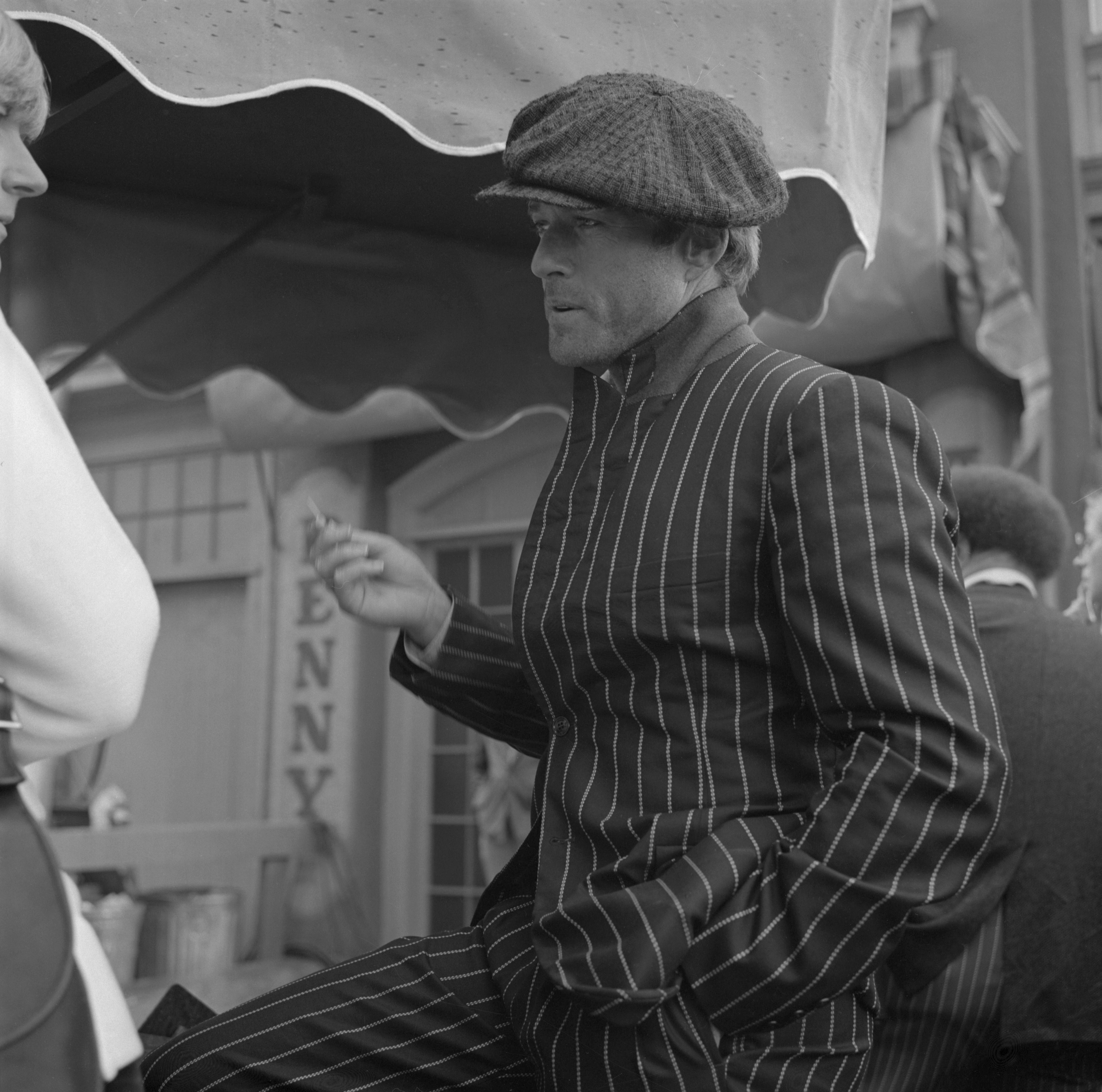
Robert Redford during a break in shooting (1973)

Jack Nicholson was offered the lead role but declined it. He later said "I had enough business acumen to know The Sting was going to be a huge hit, [but] at the same time Chinatown and The Last Detail were more interesting films to me."

Newman signed on to the film after the producers agreed to give him top billing, $500,000, and a percentage of the profits. His previous five films had been box-office disappointments.

In her 1991 autobiography You'll Never Eat Lunch in This Town Again, producer Julia Phillips writes that Hill wanted Richard Boone to play Lonnegan. Much to her relief, Newman had sent the script to Robert Shaw while shooting The Mackintosh Man in Ireland to ensure his participation in the film. Phillips' book asserts that Shaw was not nominated for an Academy Award for Best Supporting Actor because he demanded that his name follow those of Newman and Redford before the film's opening title.

Shaw's character's limp in the film was authentic. Shaw had injured his leg while playing handball shortly before filming began. Director Hill encouraged him to incorporate the limp into his character rather than withdraw from the project.

=== Principal photography ===
Hill wanted the film to be reminiscent of movies from the 1930s and drew inspiration from films of that decade. He noticed that most '30s gangster films had no extras. "For instance", Andrew Horton's book The Films of George Roy Hill quotes Hill as saying, "no extras would be used in street scenes in those films: Jimmy Cagney would be shot down and die in an empty street. So I deliberately avoided using extras."

Along with art director Henry Bumstead and cinematographer Robert L. Surtees, Hill devised a color scheme of muted browns and maroons for the film and a lighting design that combined old-fashioned 1930s-style lighting with some modern tricks of the trade to get the visual look he wanted. Edith Head designed a wardrobe of snappy period costumes for the cast, and artist Jaroslav Gebr created inter-title cards to be used to introduce each section of the film that were reminiscent of the golden glow of old Saturday Evening Post illustrations, a popular publication of the 1930s.

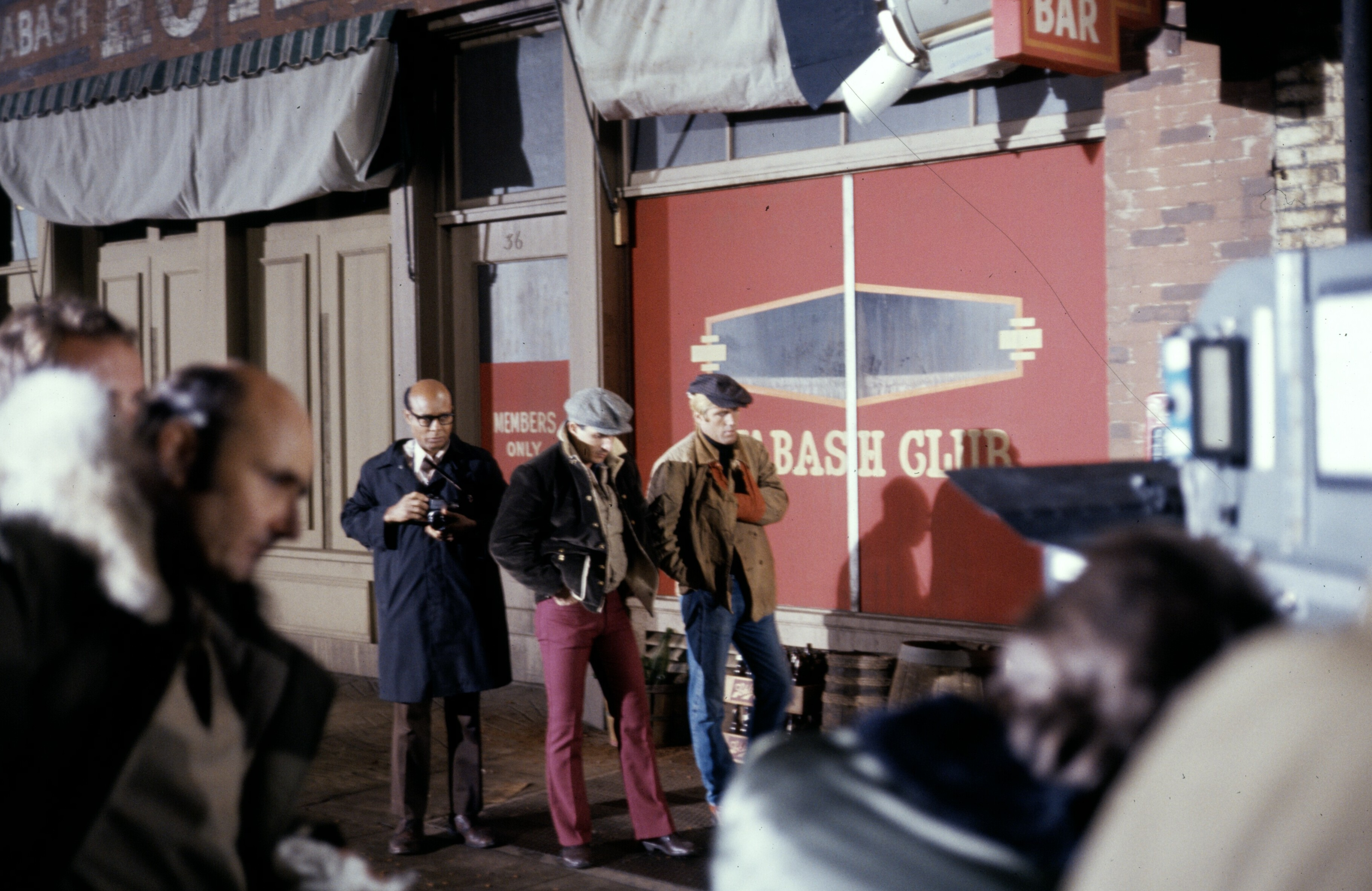
Filming on location in Pasadena, California. Stand-ins are used to set up the shot.

The movie was filmed on the Universal Studios backlot, with a few small scenes shot in Wheeling, West Virginia, some scenes filmed at the Santa Monica pier's carousel, in Southern California, and in Chicago at Union Station and the former LaSalle Street Station. An antique car buff, co-producer Tony Bill helped round up several period cars to use in The Sting. One of them was his own 1935 Pierce-Arrow limousine, which served as Lonnegan's private car.

== Reception ==
=== Box office ===
The film was a box-office smash in 1973 and early 1974, grossing $156 million in the United States and Canada. As of August 2018, it was the 20th highest-grossing film in the United States adjusted for ticket price inflation. Internationally, it grossed $101 million for a worldwide gross of $257 million.

=== Critical response ===
Roger Ebert gave the film four out of four stars and called it "one of the most stylish movies of the year". Gene Siskel awarded three-and-a-half stars out of four, calling it "a movie movie that has obviously been made with loving care each and every step of the way." Vincent Canby of The New York Times wrote that the film was "so good-natured, so obviously aware of everything it's up to, even its own picturesque frauds, that I opt to go along with it. One forgives its unrelenting efforts to charm, if only because The Sting itself is a kind of con game, devoid of the poetic aspirations that weighed down Butch Cassidy and the Sundance Kid." Variety wrote, "George Roy Hill's outstanding direction of David S. Ward's finely-crafted story of multiple deception and surprise ending will delight both mass and class audiences. Extremely handsome production values and a great supporting cast round out the virtues." Kevin Thomas of the Los Angeles Times called it "an unalloyed delight, the kind of pure entertainment film that's all the more welcome for having become such a rarity." John Simon wrote that The Sting as a comedy-thriller "works endearingly without a hitch".

Pauline Kael of The New Yorker was less enthusiastic, writing that the film "is meant to be roguishly charming entertainment, and that's how most of the audience takes it, but I found it visually claustrophobic, and totally mechanical. It keeps cranking on, section after section, and it doesn't have a good spirit."

In 2005, the film was selected for preservation in the United States National Film Registry by the Library of Congress as "culturally, historically, or aesthetically significant". In 2006, the Writers Guild of America ranked the screenplay #39 on its list of 101 Greatest Screenplays ever written. In 2016, the Directors Guild of America ranked the film 62nd on its list of The 80 Best-Directed Films since the Guild’s founding in 1936. On Rotten Tomatoes, The Sting holds a rating of 93% from 109 reviews, with an average rating of 8.3/10. The site's critical consensus reads: "Paul Newman, Robert Redford, and director George Roy Hill prove that charm, humor, and a few slick twists can add up to a great film." On Metacritic, the film has a weighted average score of 83 out of 100, based on 17 critics, indicating "universal acclaim".

=== Awards and nominations ===
Award	Category	Nominee(s)	Result	Ref.
Academy Awards	Best Picture	Tony Bill, Julia Phillips, Michael Phillips	Won	
Academy Awards	Best Director	George Roy Hill	Won	
Academy Awards	Best Actor	Robert Redford	Nominated	
Academy Awards	Best Original Screenplay	David S. Ward	Won	
Academy Awards	Best Art Direction	Henry Bumstead, James W. Payne	Won	
Academy Awards	Best Cinematography	Robert Surtees	Nominated	
Academy Awards	Best Costume Design	Edith Head	Won	
Academy Awards	Best Film Editing	William Reynolds	Won	
Academy Awards	Best Scoring: Original Song Score and Adaptation or Scoring: Adaptation	Marvin Hamlisch	Won	
Academy Awards	Best Sound	Ronald Pierce, Robert R. Bertrand	Nominated	
American Cinema Editors Awards	Best Edited Feature Film	William Reynolds	Won	
David di Donatello Awards	Best Foreign Actor	Robert Redford	Won (Note: Tied with Al Pacino for Serpico.)	
Directors Guild of America Awards	Outstanding Directorial Achievement in Motion Pictures	George Roy Hill	Won	
Edgar Allan Poe Awards	Best Motion Picture	David S. Ward	Nominated	
Golden Globe Awards	Best Screenplay – Motion Picture	David S. Ward	Nominated	
Golden Screen Awards			Won	
Kinema Junpo Awards	Best Foreign Language Film Director	George Roy Hill	Won	
National Board of Review Awards	Top Ten Films		Won	
National Board of Review Awards	Best Film		Won	
National Film Preservation Board	National Film Registry		Inducted	
Online Film & Television Association Awards	Hall of Fame – Motion Picture		Honored	
People's Choice Awards	Favorite Motion Picture		Won	
Producers Guild of America Awards	Hall of Fame – Motion Pictures	Tony Bill, Julia Phillips, Michael Phillips	Won	
Writers Guild of America Awards	Best Drama – Written Directly for the Screen	David S. Ward	Nominated	

== Soundtrack ==
The Entertainer
A live performance of "The Entertainer", by Scott Joplin

The soundtrack album, executive produced by Gil Rodin, includes several of Scott Joplin's ragtime compositions, adapted by Marvin Hamlisch.

According to Joplin scholar Edward A. Berlin, ragtime experienced a revival in the 1970s due to several events: a best-selling recording of Joplin rags on the classical Nonesuch Records label, along with a collection of his music issued by the New York Public Library; the first full staging of Joplin's opera Treemonisha; and a performance of period orchestrations of Joplin's music by a student ensemble of the New England Conservatory of Music, led by Gunther Schuller. "Inspired by Schuller's recording, [Hill] had Marvin Hamlisch score Joplin's music for the film, thereby bringing Joplin to a mass, popular public."

== Sequel and adaptations ==
The Sting II was released in 1983. It was directed by Jeremy Paul Kagan and starred Jackie Gleason, Mac Davis, Teri Garr, Karl Malden and Oliver Reed.

Mark Hollmann and Greg Kotis (music and lyrics), writer Bob Martin, and director John Rando created a stage musical version of the movie. The musical premiered at the Paper Mill Playhouse in Millburn, New Jersey on March 29, 2018. Henry Gondorff was played by Harry Connick Jr., with choreography by Warren Carlyle. The stage musical incorporates Joplin's music, including "The Entertainer".

Robert Weverka adapted the film into a full-length novel, The Sting (1974), based on the screenplay by David S. Ward.

== Home media ==
The movie was issued on DVD by Universal Studios Home Video in 1998. "If Paul Newman really does retire, he can spend his rocking chair years feeling smug about this," enthused Bruno MacDonald for OK! "The story's not the important thing: what makes it are the quirky soundtrack, the card-sharp dialogue and two superduperstars at their superduperstarriest."

A deluxe DVD – The Sting: Special Edition (part of the Universal Legacy Series) – was released in September 2005. Its "making of" featurette, The Art of the Sting, included interviews with the cast and crew.

The film was released on Blu-ray in 2012 as part of Universal's 100th anniversary releases.

The Sting was released on Ultra HD Blu-ray on May 18, 2021.

== See also ==
- List of American films of 1973
- List of highest-grossing films in the United States and Canada
