= Steelyard Blues =

1973 film by Alan Myerson

- Theatrical release poster
- Directed by: Alan Myerson
- Written by: David S. Ward
- Produced by: Tony Bill; Michael Phillips; Julia Phillips
- Starring: Donald Sutherland; Jane Fonda; Peter Boyle; Howard Hesseman; John Savage
- Cinematography: László Kovács; Stevan Larner
- Edited by: Robert Grovener
- Music by: Nick Gravenites
- Distributed by: Warner Bros.
- Release date: January 31, 1973
- Running time: 93 minutes
- Country: United States
- Language: English
- Box office: $1 million (US/ Canada rentals)

Steelyard Blues is a 1973 American comedy crime film, directed by Alan Myerson, and starring Donald Sutherland, Jane Fonda and Peter Boyle.

== Plot ==
A group of misfits tries to find a happier life against the norms of society. Donald Sutherland plays an ex-con with a passion for demolition derbies. He has wrecked almost every possible car. He violates his parole when confronted by a 1950 Studebaker. This embarrasses his brother, a politically ambitious district attorney played by Howard Hesseman in an unlikely respectable role. Jane Fonda plays a prostitute who engages in an off-again/on-again relationship with Sutherland's character. The plot hilariously thickens when this gang of merry misfits tries to repair an old Consolidated PBY Catalina airplane, and get it flying again.

== Cast ==
- Mel Stewart – Black Man in Jail
- Donald Sutherland – Jesse Veldini
- Howard Hesseman – Frank Veldini
- Morgan Upton – Police Capt. Bill
- Peter Boyle – Eagle Thornberry
- Jessica Myerson – Savage Rose
- Dan Barrows – Rocky
- John Savage – Kid
- Jane Fonda – Iris Caine
- Nancy Fish – Pool Hall Waitress
- Roger Bowen – Fire Commissioner Francis
- Garry Goodrow – Duval Jax
- Lynette Bernay – Bar Waitress
- Richard Schaal – Zoo Official Mel
- Edward Greenberg – Rookie Cop

== Alternate title ==
In 1979, the film was broadcast on NBC under the title, Final Crash.

== Soundtrack album ==
All tracks written by Nick Gravenites and Mike Bloomfield, except where indicated.

=== Side One ===
1. "Swing With It"
2. "Brand New Family"
3. "Woman's Love"
4. "Make the Headlines"
5. "Georgia Blues" (Maria Muldaur/Bloomfield/Gravenites)
6. "My Bag (The Oysters)"
7. "Common Ground"

=== Side Two ===
1. "Being Different"
2. "I've Been Searching"
3. "Do I Care" (Merl Saunders/Muldaur)
4. "Lonesome Star Blues" (Maria Muldaur)
5. "Here I Come (There She Goes)"
6. "If You Cared"
7. "Theme from Steelyard Blues (Drive Again)"

Performers: John Kahn, Chris Parker, Merl Saunders, Annie Sampson, Mike Bloomfield, Maria Muldaur, Nick Gravenites, Paul Butterfield
