= The Beat (1987 film) =

- Film poster
- Directed by: Paul Mones
- Written by: Paul Mones
- Produced by: Jon Kilik; Julia Phillips; Nick Wechsler
- Starring: David Jacobson; William McNamara; Kara Glover; John Savage
- Cinematography: Tom DiCillo
- Edited by: Elizabeth Kling
- Music by: Carter Burwell
- Distributed by: Vestron Pictures
- Release dates: May 13, 1987 (Cannes Film Market); June 3, 1988 (United States)
- Running time: 98 minutes
- Country: United States
- Language: English

The Beat is a 1988 American drama film written and directed by Paul Mones. Lawrence Kasanoff was one of the executive producers.

== Plot ==
A new kid moves into a tough neighborhood controlled by gangs, and tries to teach them poetry.

== Cast ==
- David Jacobson as Rex Voorhas Ormine
- William McNamara as Billy Kane
- Kara Glover as Kate Kane
- Stuart Alexander as Doug
- David McCarthy as Dirt - Larry
- John Savage as Frank Ellsworth
- Markus Flanagan as Vis
- Paul Dillon as Lon Recchia
- Reggie Rock Bythewood as Danny Lambeaux
- Tony Gillan as Auggie
- Lisa Richards as Amy Kahn
- Richard Eigen as Ian Murphy
- Angie Zisser as Mary
- Cro-Mags as Iron Skulls

== Release ==
The movie was first shown at the Cannes Film Festival in 1987 and released into U.S. theaters the next year, reportedly grossing less than $5,000. In 1989, Vestron Video released the movie on videocassette. The movie has never been released on DVD, and as of December 30, 2020, Lions Gate has not yet announced any plans for a DVD release.
