= Tony Bill =

American actor, producer, and director

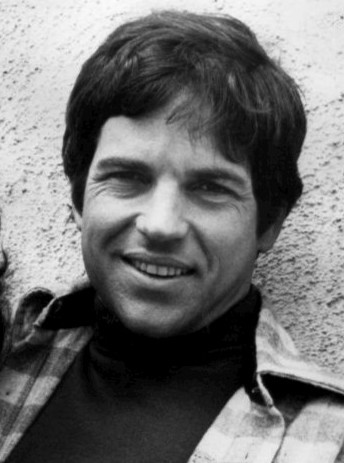
- Bill in 1977
- Born: Gerard Anthony Bill; San Diego, California, U.S.
- Other name: Gerald Bill
- Occupations: Actor, director, producer
- Years active: 1959–present
- Spouses: Toni Gray (m. 1962; div. 1969) Helen Buck Bartlett (m. 1993)
- Children: 4
- Awards: Academy Award for Best Picture (1974) – The Sting (shared with Michael Phillips and Julia Phillips)

Gerard Anthony Bill is an American actor, producer, and director. He produced the 1973 movie The Sting, for which he shared the Academy Award for Best Picture with Michael Phillips and Julia Phillips. As an actor, Bill had supporting roles in Come Blow Your Horn (1963), Shampoo (1975), Pee-wee's Big Adventure (1985), and Less than Zero (1987). He made his directorial debut with My Bodyguard (1980) and directed the films Six Weeks (1982), Five Corners (1987), Crazy People (1990), Untamed Heart (1993), A Home of Our Own (1993), and Flyboys (2006).

== Early life ==
Bill was born in San Diego, California, and attended St. Augustine High School. He majored in English and art at the University of Notre Dame, from which he graduated in 1962.

== Career ==
Bill began his career as an actor in the 1960s, first appearing on screen as Frank Sinatra's ingenuous younger brother in Come Blow Your Horn (1963). The same year, he appeared in Soldier in the Rain starring Jackie Gleason and Steve McQueen. Thereafter, he was cast as Chris Herrod in the 1965 episode "An Elephant Is Like a Tree" of the drama series Mr. Novak.

Bill specialized in juveniles and young leads. In the mid-1960s, he made two appearances in the BBC's Play of the Month anthology series, he took the lead in Lee Oswald Assassin and played Biff to Rod Steiger's Willy Loman in Death of a Salesman (both 1966).

Often his characters were likeable but none too bright. Other acting credits include Marriage on the Rocks (1965), None but the Brave (1965), You're a Big Boy Now (1966), Never a Dull Moment (1968), How to Steal the World (1968), Ice Station Zebra (1968), Castle Keep (1969), Flap (1970), Shampoo (1975), Are You in the House Alone? (1978), Heart Beat (1980), The Little Dragons (1980), Freedom (1981), Pee-wee's Big Adventure (1985), Less than Zero (1987), and The Killing Mind (1991).

Bill continued to act in television movies, miniseries, and guest spots, though with decreasing frequency as he segued into directing. In 1965, Bill guest-starred in "An Echo of Bugles," the opening episode of Rod Serling's Western series The Loner, playing a hot-headed bully who taunts a Confederate veteran and challenges series star Lloyd Bridges to a duel. He appeared in the 1966 episode "Chaff in the Wind" of the western The Virginian and the 1966 episode "The Oath" of the western Bonanza. He was cast in the 1967 episode "The Predators" of The Road West. He also starred in a 1968 episode of The Man from U.N.C.L.E. titled "The Seven Wonders of the World Affair, Parts 1 and 2." He was featured on an ABC movie titled Haunts of the Very Rich (1972), appeared in the 1977 miniseries Washington: Behind Closed Doors, and the drama anthology series as the narrator What Really Happened to the Class of '65?.

In 1980, Bill directed his first film My Bodyguard. He went on to direct Six Weeks (1982), Five Corners (1987), Crazy People (1990), Untamed Heart (1993), A Home of Our Own (1993), and Flyboys (2006), which Bill claims was one of the early features shot entirely with digital cameras. For television, Bill directed Truman Capote's One Christmas (1994), Harlan County War (2000), and Pictures of Hollis Woods (2007).

In 2009, Bill published the book Movie Speak: How to Talk Like You Belong on a Film Set. The book traces the etymology of the language of the movie set and is filled out with stories from Bill's career in film.

From 1984 to 2000, he co-owned with Dudley Moore the 72 Market Street Oyster Bar and Grill, a restaurant in Venice, California.

== Personal life ==
Bill married Toni Gray in December 1962.

== Bibliography ==
- Gilbert, Roland; Lia, Robert (1998). 72 Market Street Dishes It Out!: A Collection of Recipes and Portraits from a Classic Venice Restaurant. Venice, California: Wave Publishing. ISBN 9780964235922.
