= 49th Academy Awards =

- Date: March 28, 1977
- Site: Dorothy Chandler Pavilion; Los Angeles, California, U.S.
- Hosted by: Richard Pryor, Ellen Burstyn, Jane Fonda and Warren Beatty
- Produced by: William Friedkin
- Directed by: Marty Pasetta

Highlights
- Best Picture: Rocky
- Most awards: All the President's Men and Network (4)
- Most nominations: Network and Rocky (10)

TV in the United States
- Network: ABC
- Duration: 3 hours, 38 minutes

The 49th Academy Awards were presented Monday, March 28, 1977, at the Dorothy Chandler Pavilion in Los Angeles, California, hosted by Richard Pryor, Ellen Burstyn, Jane Fonda, and Warren Beatty. Both Network and All the President's Men won four Oscars, the most of the evening, but lost Best Picture and Best Director, as well as Best Editing, to Rocky.

Network became the second film (after A Streetcar Named Desire) to win three acting Oscars, the last to do so until Everything Everywhere All at Once, and the last, as of the 97th Academy Awards, to receive five acting nominations. It was also the eleventh of fifteen films (to date) to receive nominations in all four acting categories. Best Actor winner Peter Finch became the first posthumous acting winner, having suffered a fatal heart attack in mid-January. With only five minutes and two seconds of screentime, Beatrice Straight set a record for the shortest performance ever to win an acting Oscar (Best Supporting Actress). Paddy Chayefsky won his third solo writing Oscar for Network, a record that remains to this day.

Sylvester Stallone became the first person since Orson Welles to receive nominations for writing and acting for the same film (Rocky), losing in both categories to Network.

Piper Laurie was nominated for Best Supporting Actress for Carrie (1976), her first role since her Best Actress-nominated performance in The Hustler (1961), thus being nominated for two consecutive roles, fifteen years apart.

Lina Wertmüller became the first woman nominated for Best Director for Seven Beauties, which was also nominated for Best Foreign Language Film. With her win for Best Original Song as the composer for the love theme "Evergreen" from A Star Is Born, Barbra Streisand became the first woman to be honored in the category, and, as of the 97th Academy Awards, the only person to have won Academy Awards for both acting and songwriting (following her Best Actress win for Funny Girl at the 40th Academy Awards).

No honorary awards were given this year.

ABC held the rights to the Oscars from 1961 to 1970 and regained them for the 1976 event. For the second straight year, the ceremony was scheduled directly opposite the NCAA championship basketball game on NBC, won by Marquette in Al McGuire's final game as head coach.

== Winners and nominees ==
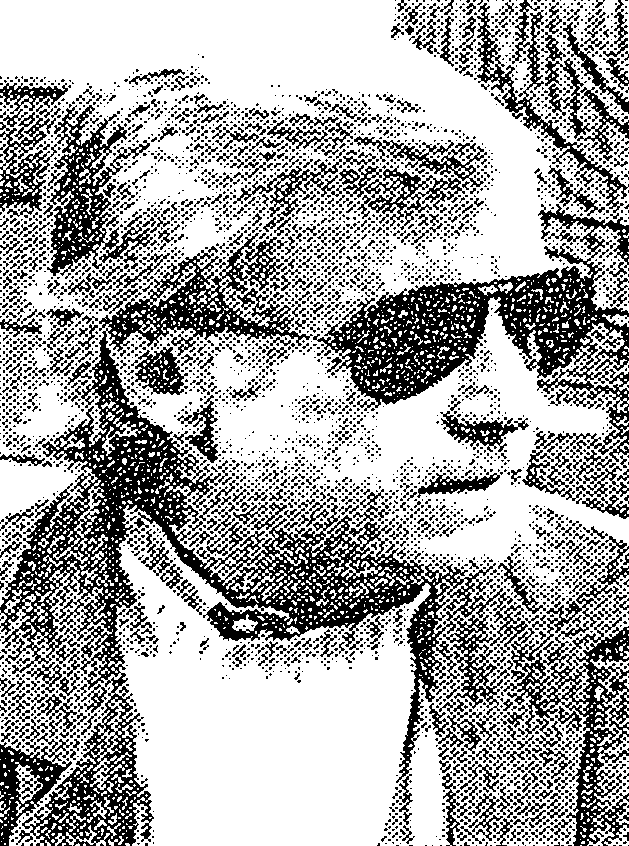
John G. Avildsen, Best Director winner

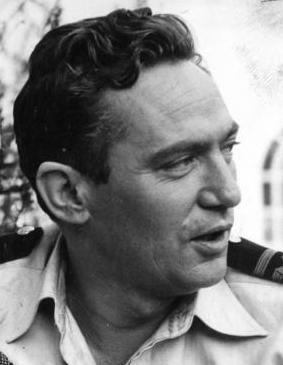
Peter Finch, Best Actor winner

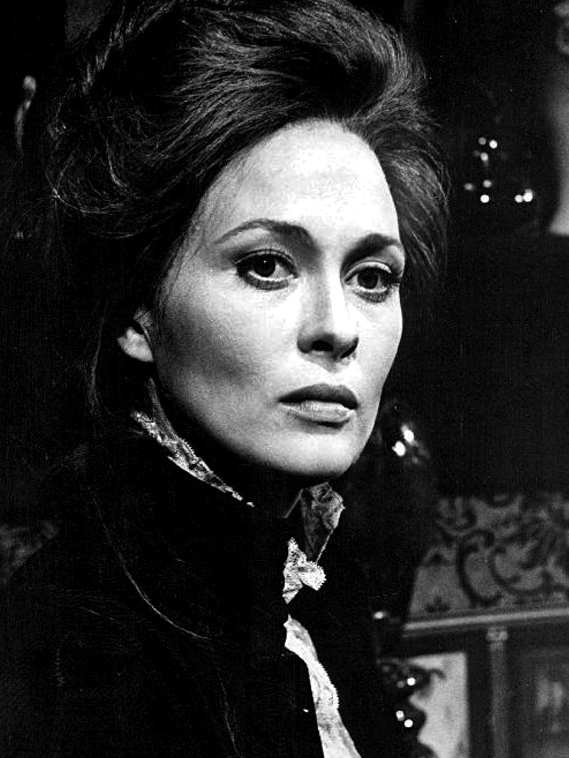
Faye Dunaway, Best Actress winner

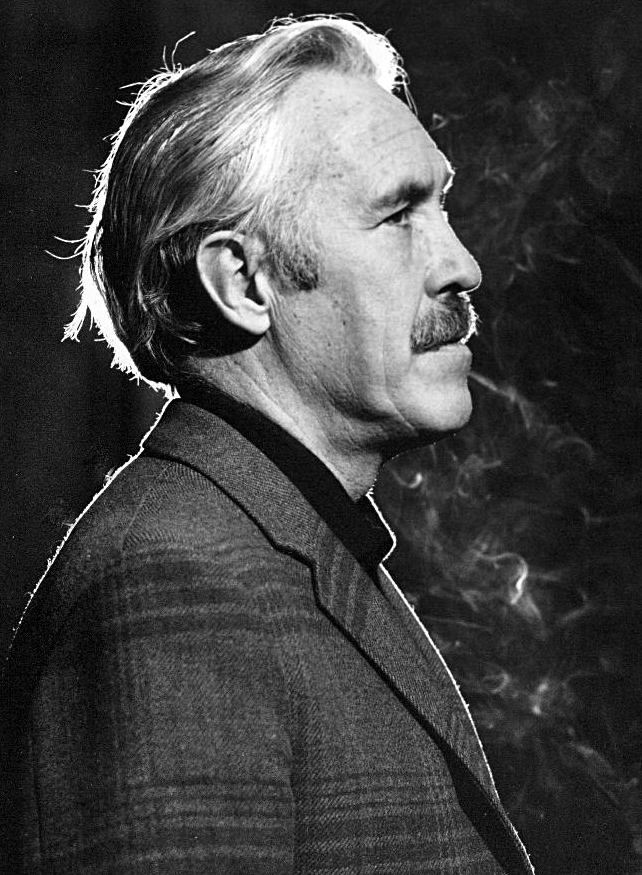
Jason Robards, Best Supporting Actor winner

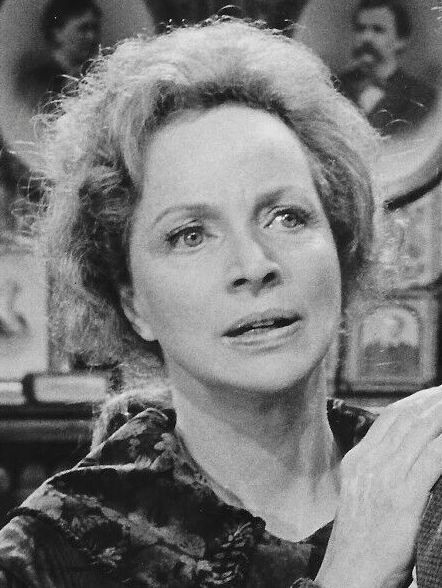
Beatrice Straight, Best Supporting Actress winner

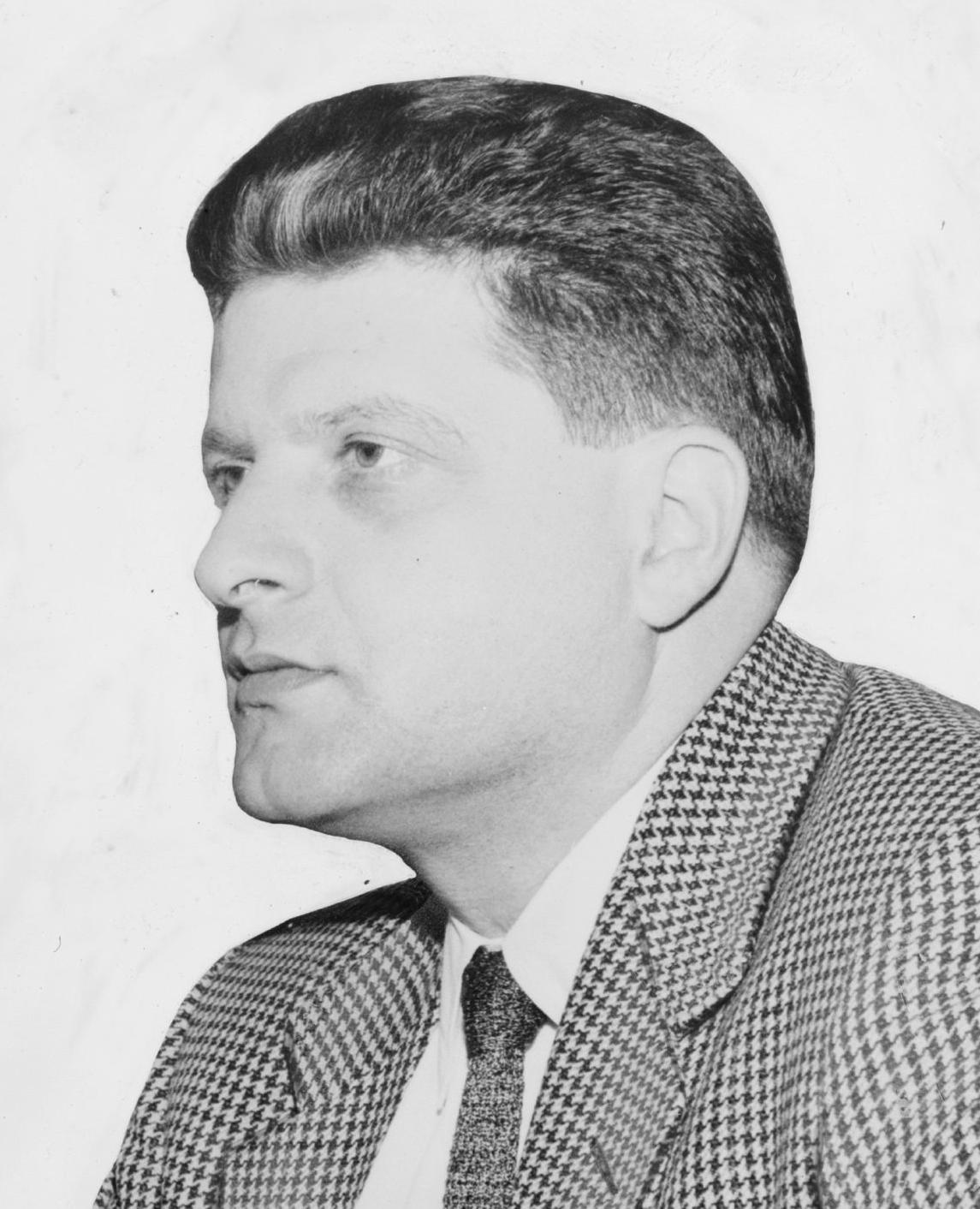
Paddy Chayefsky, Best Original Screenplay winner

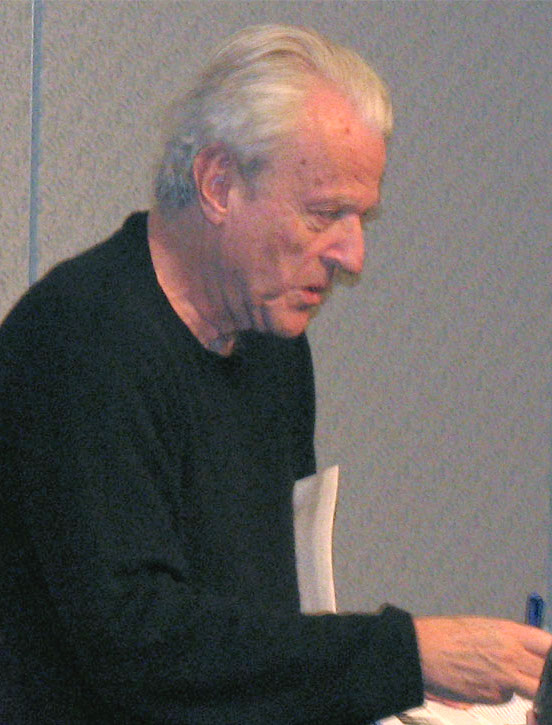
William Goldman, Best Adapted Screenplay winner

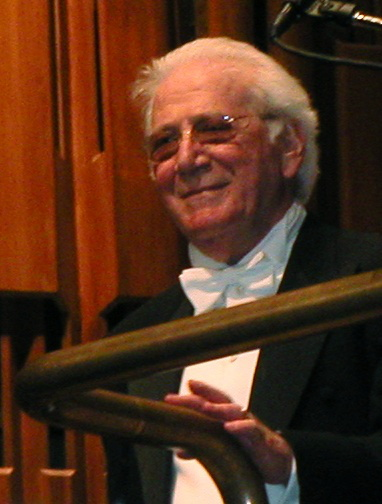
Jerry Goldsmith, Best Original Score winner

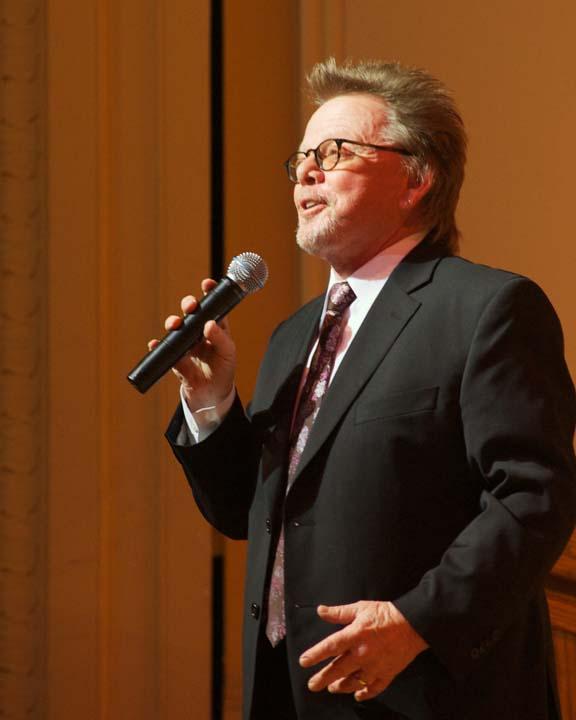
Paul Williams, Best Original Song co-winner

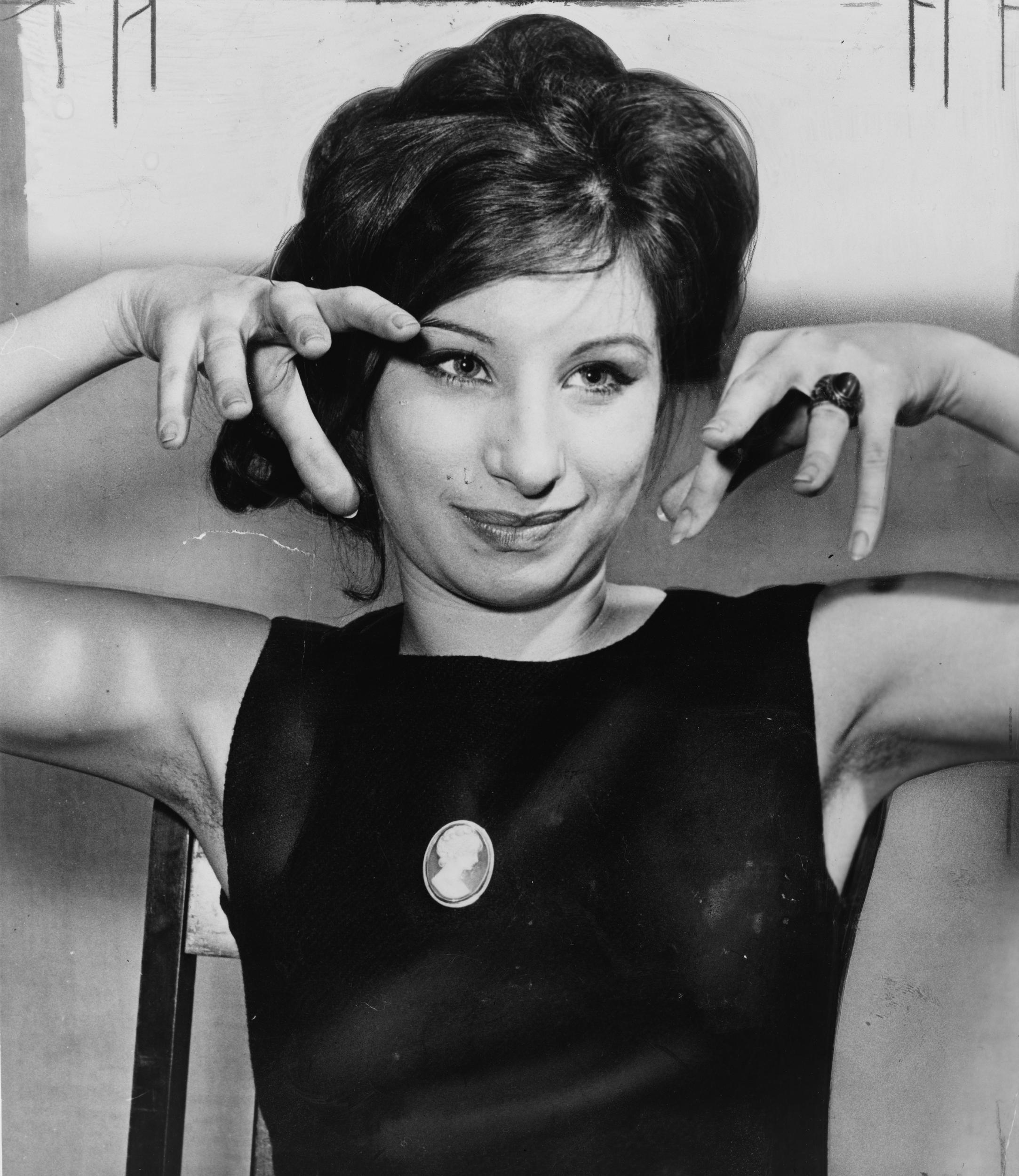
Barbra Streisand, Best Original Song co-winner

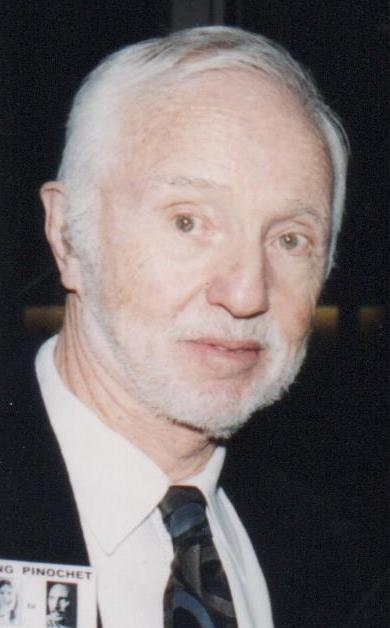
Haskell Wexler, Best Cinematography winner

Nominees were announced on February 10, 1977. Winners are listed first and highlighted in boldface.

**Best Picture**: **Rocky – Robert Chartoff and Irwin Winkler, producers**; All the President's Men – Walter Coblenz, producer; Bound for Glory – Robert F. Blumofe and Harold Leventhal, producers; Network – Howard Gottfried, producer; Taxi Driver – Julia Phillips and Michael Phillips, producers	**Best Directing**: **John G. Avildsen – Rocky**; Alan J. Pakula – All the President's Men; Ingmar Bergman – Face to Face; Sidney Lumet – Network; Lina Wertmüller – Seven Beauties
**Best Actor in a Leading Role**: **Peter Finch – Network as Howard Beale** (posthumous award); Robert De Niro – Taxi Driver as Travis Bickle; Giancarlo Giannini – Seven Beauties as Pasqualino; William Holden – Network as Max Schumacher; Sylvester Stallone – Rocky as Rocky Balboa	**Best Actress in a Leading Role**: **Faye Dunaway – Network as Diana Christensen**; Marie-Christine Barrault – Cousin Cousine as Marthe; Talia Shire – Rocky as Adrian Pennino; Sissy Spacek – Carrie as Carrie White; Liv Ullmann – Face to Face as Jenny Isaksson
**Best Actor in a Supporting Role**: **Jason Robards – All the President's Men as Ben Bradlee**; Ned Beatty – Network as Arthur Jensen; Burgess Meredith – Rocky as "Mickey" Goldmill; Laurence Olivier – Marathon Man as Dr. Christian Szell; Burt Young – Rocky as Paulie Pennino	**Best Actress in a Supporting Role**: **Beatrice Straight – Network as Louise Schumacher**; Jane Alexander – All the President's Men as Judy Graham Hoback; Jodie Foster – Taxi Driver as Iris Steensma; Lee Grant – Voyage of the Damned as Lillian Rosen; Piper Laurie – Carrie as Margaret White
**Best Writing (Screenplay Written Directly for the Screen -- Based on Factual Material or on Story Material Not Previously Published or Produced)**: **Network – Paddy Chayefsky**; Cousin Cousine – Jean-Charles Tacchella and Danièle Thompson; The Front – Walter Bernstein; Rocky – Sylvester Stallone; Seven Beauties – Lina Wertmüller	**Best Writing (Screenplay -- Based on Material from Another Medium)**: **All the President's Men – William Goldman based on the book by Carl Bernstein and Bob Woodward**; Bound for Glory – Robert Getchell based on the book by Woody Guthrie; Fellini's Casanova – Federico Fellini and Bernardino Zapponi based on the autobiography Histoire de ma vie by Giacomo Casanova; The Seven-Per-Cent Solution – Nicholas Meyer based on his novel; Voyage of the Damned – David Butler and Steve Shagan based on the book by Gordon Thomas and Max Morgan Witts
**Best Foreign Language Film**: **Black and White in Color (Côte d'Ivoire)**; Cousin Cousine (France); Jacob the Liar (East Germany); Nights and Days (Poland); Seven Beauties (Italy)	**Best Documentary (Feature)**: **Harlan County, USA – Barbara Kopple**; Hollywood on Trial – James Gutman and David Helpern Jr.; Off the Edge – Michael Firth; People of the Wind – Anthony Howarth and David Koff; Volcano: An Inquiry into the Life and Death of Malcolm Lowry – Donald Brittain and John Kramer
**Best Documentary (Short Subject)**: **Number Our Days – Lynne Littman**; American Shoeshine – Sparky Greene; Blackwood – Tony Ianzelo and Andy Thomson; The End of the Road – John Armstrong; Universe – Lester Novros	**Best Short Film (Live Action)**: **In the Region of Ice – Andre R. Guttfreund and Peter Werner**; Kudzu – Marjorie Anne Short; The Morning Spider – Julian Chagrin and Claude Chagrin; Nightlife – Claire Wilbur and Robin Lehman; Number One – Dyan Cannon and Vince Cannon
**Best Short Film (Animated)**: **Leisure – Suzanne Baker**; Dedalo – Manfredo Manfredi; The Street – Caroline Leaf and Guy Glover	**Best Music (Original Score)**: **The Omen – Jerry Goldsmith**; Obsession – Bernard Herrmann (posthumous nomination); The Outlaw Josey Wales – Jerry Fielding; Taxi Driver – Bernard Herrmann (posthumous nomination); Voyage of the Damned – Lalo Schifrin
**Best Music (Original Song Score and Its Adaptation or Adaptation Score)**: **Bound for Glory – Leonard Rosenman**; Bugsy Malone – Paul Williams; A Star Is Born – Roger Kellaway	**Best Music (Original Song)**: **"Evergreen (Love Theme from A Star Is Born)" from A Star Is Born – Music by Barbra Streisand; Lyrics by Paul Williams**; "Ave Satani" from The Omen – Music and Lyrics by Jerry Goldsmith; "Come to Me" from The Pink Panther Strikes Again – Music by Henry Mancini; Lyrics by Don Black; "Gonna Fly Now" from Rocky – Music by Bill Conti; Lyrics by Carol Connors and Ayn Robbins; "A World That Never Was" from Half a House – Music by Sammy Fain; Lyrics by Paul Francis Webster
**Best Sound**: **All the President's Men – Arthur Piantadosi, Les Fresholtz, Dick Alexander and Jim Webb**; King Kong – Harry Warren Tetrick (posthumous nomination), William McCaughey, Aaron Rochin and Jack Solomon; Rocky – Harry Warren Tetrick (posthumous nomination), William McCaughey, Lyle Burbridge and Bud Alper; Silver Streak – Donald Mitchell, Douglas Williams, Richard Tyler and Hal Etherington; A Star Is Born – Robert Knudson, Dan Wallin, Robert Glass and Tom Overton	**Best Art Direction**: **All the President's Men – Art Direction: George Jenkins; Set Decoration: George Gaines**; The Incredible Sarah – Art Direction: Elliot Scott and Norman Reynolds; Set Decoration: Peter Howitt; The Last Tycoon – Art Direction: Gene Callahan and Jack T. Collis; Set Decoration: Jerry Wunderlich; Logan's Run – Art Direction: Dale Hennesy; Set Decoration: Robert De Vestel; The Shootist – Art Direction: Robert F. Boyle; Set Decoration: Arthur Jeph Parker
**Best Cinematography**: **Bound for Glory – Haskell Wexler**; King Kong – Richard H. Kline; Logan's Run – Ernest Laszlo; Network – Owen Roizman; A Star Is Born – Robert Surtees	**Best Costume Design**: **Fellini's Casanova – Danilo Donati**; Bound for Glory – William Ware Theiss; The Incredible Sarah – Anthony Mendleson; The Passover Plot – Mary Wills; The Seven-Per-Cent Solution – Alan Barrett
**Best Film Editing**: **Rocky – Richard Halsey and Scott Conrad**; All the President's Men – Robert L. Wolfe; Bound for Glory – Robert C. Jones and Pembroke J. Herring; Network – Alan Heim; Two-Minute Warning – Eve Newman and Walter Hannemann

=== Special Achievement Awards (Visual Effects) ===
- King Kong – Carlo Rambaldi, Glen Robinson and Frank Van der Veer.
- Logan's Run – L. B. Abbott, Glen Robinson and Matthew Yuricich.

=== Irving G. Thalberg Memorial Award ===
- Pandro S. Berman

=== Multiple nominations and awards ===
Films with multiple nominations
Nominations	Film
10	Network
10	Rocky
8	All the President's Men
6	Bound for Glory
4	Seven Beauties
4	A Star Is Born
4	Taxi Driver
3	Cousin Cousine
3	Voyage of the Damned
2	Carrie
2	Face to Face
2	Fellini's Casanova
2	The Incredible Sarah
2	King Kong (Note: Not counting the non-competitive Special Achievement Award for King Kong.)
2	Logan's Run (Note: Not counting the non-competitive Special Achievement Award for Logan's Run.)
2	The Omen
2	The Seven-Per-Cent Solution

Films with multiple awards
Awards	Film
4	All the President's Men
4	Network
3	Rocky
2	Bound for Glory

== Presenters and performers ==
The following individuals, listed in order of appearance, presented awards or performed musical numbers:

=== Presenters ===
Name	Role
Hank Simms	Announcer of the 49th annual Academy Awards
Walter Mirisch (AMPAS President)	Gave opening remarks welcoming guests to the awards ceremony
Chevy Chase	Explains the voting rules to the public
Tatum O'Neal	Presenter of the award for Best Supporting Actor
Marty Feldman	Presenter of the Short Films Awards
Roy Scheider	Presenter of the Special Achievement Award
Marthe Keller	Presenter of the award for Best Art Direction
Muhammad Ali; Sylvester Stallone	Presenters of the award for Best Supporting Actress
William Holden	Presenter of the award for Best Film Editing
Red Skelton	Presenter of the award for Best Sound
Cicely Tyson	Presenter of the Irving G. Thalberg Memorial Award to Pandro S. Berman
Donald Sutherland	Presenter of the award for Best Cinematography
Pearl Bailey	Presenter of the award for Best Foreign Language Film
Ann-Margret	Presenter of the Music Awards
Lillian Hellman	Presenter of the Documentary Awards
Neil Diamond	Presenter of the award for Best Original Song
Norman Mailer	Presenter of the Writing Awards
Jeanne Moreau	Presenter of the award for Best Director
Tamara Dobson	Presenter of the award for Best Costume Design
Liv Ullmann	Presenter of the award for Best Actor
Louise Fletcher	Presenter of the award for Best Actress
Jack Nicholson	Presenter of the award for Best Picture

=== Performers ===
Name	Role	Performed
Bill Conti	Musical arranger and conductor	Orchestral
Ann-Margret	Performer	“Magic Circle (It All Started in Someone's Head)“
Eddie Albert	Performer	"A World That Never Was" from Half a House
Ben Vereen	Performer	"Gonna Fly Now" from Rocky
Tom Jones	Performer	"Come to Me" from The Pink Panther Strikes Again
Tony Vivante	Performer	"Ave Satani" from The Omen
Barbra Streisand	Performer	"Evergreen (Love Theme from A Star Is Born)" from A Star Is Born
Ann-Margret	Performer	“Magic Circle (Reprise)”

== See also ==
- 34th Golden Globe Awards
- 1976 in film
- 19th Grammy Awards
- 28th Primetime Emmy Awards
- 29th Primetime Emmy Awards
- 30th British Academy Film Awards
- 31st Tony Awards
