= 1976 New York Film Critics Circle Awards =

42nd New York Film Critics Circle Awards

42nd New York Film Critics Circle Awards

January 30, 1977
(announced January 3, 1977)

Best Picture:
All the President's Men

The 42nd New York Film Critics Circle Awards, 30 January 1977, honored the best filmmaking of 1976.

== Winners ==
- Best Actor:
  - Robert De Niro - Taxi Driver
  - Runners-up: David Carradine - Bound for Glory and Robert Duvall - Network and The Seven-Per-Cent Solution
- Best Actress:
  - Liv Ullmann - Face to Face (Ansikte mot ansikte)
  - Runners-up: Faye Dunaway - Network and Sissy Spacek - Carrie
- Best Director:
  - Alan J. Pakula - All the President's Men
  - Runners-up: Martin Scorsese - Taxi Driver and Lina Wertmüller - Seven Beauties
- Best Film:
  - All the President's Men
  - Runners-up: Network and Seven Beauties
- Best Screenplay:
  - Paddy Chayefsky - Network
  - Runners-up: Harold Pinter - The Last Tycoon and Lina Wertmüller - Seven Beauties
- Best Supporting Actor:
  - Jason Robards - All the President's Men
  - Runners-up: Harvey Keitel - Taxi Driver and Richard Pryor - Silver Streak
- Best Supporting Actress:
  - Talia Shire - Rocky
  - Runners-up: Jodie Foster - Taxi Driver and Marie-France Pisier - Cousin Cousine
