= All the President's Men (film) =

1976 film by Alan J. Pakula

- Theatrical release poster
- Directed by: Alan J. Pakula
- Screenplay by: William Goldman
- Based on: All the President's Men by: Carl Bernstein; Bob Woodward
- Produced by: Walter Coblenz
- Starring: Robert Redford; Dustin Hoffman; Jack Warden; Martin Balsam; Hal Holbrook; Jason Robards
- Cinematography: Gordon Willis
- Edited by: Robert L. Wolfe
- Music by: David Shire
- Production company: Wildwood Enterprises
- Distributed by: Warner Bros.
- Release dates: April 7, 1976 (New York and Los Angeles); April 9, 1976 (United States)
- Running time: 138 minutes
- Country: United States
- Language: English
- Budget: $8.5 million
- Box office: $70.6 million

All the President's Men is a 1976 American biographical neo-noir political thriller film directed by Alan J. Pakula, with a screenplay by William Goldman, about the Watergate scandal that brought down the presidency of Richard Nixon. Based on the 1974 non-fiction book by journalists Carl Bernstein and Bob Woodward, it stars Robert Redford and Dustin Hoffman as Woodward and Bernstein, respectively, as they investigate the scandal for The Washington Post. It was produced by Walter Coblenz for Redford's Wildwood Enterprises.

The film garnered critical acclaim upon its release, and was nominated in multiple Oscar, Golden Globe and BAFTA categories; Jason Robards won the Academy Award for Best Supporting Actor for his portrayal of Ben Bradlee. In 2010, it was selected for preservation in the United States National Film Registry by the Library of Congress as being "culturally, historically, or aesthetically significant".

== Plot ==
On June 17, 1972, Frank Wills, a security guard at the Watergate complex finds a door's bolt taped over to prevent it from locking. He calls the police, who find and arrest five burglars in the Democratic National Committee headquarters within the complex. The next morning, The Washington Post assigns new reporter Bob Woodward to the local courthouse to cover the story, which is considered of minor importance.

Woodward learns that the five men—James W. McCord Jr. and four Cuban-Americans from Miami—possessed electronic bugging equipment, and are represented by a high-priced "country club" attorney. At the arraignment, McCord identifies himself in court as having recently left the Central Intelligence Agency (CIA), and the others are also revealed to have CIA ties. Woodward connects the burglars to E. Howard Hunt, an employee of President Richard Nixon's White House Counsel Charles Colson, and formerly of the CIA.

Carl Bernstein, another Post reporter, is assigned to cover the Watergate story with Woodward. The two young men are reluctant partners but work well together. Executive editor Benjamin Bradlee believes that their work lacks reliable sources and is not worthy of the Post's front page, but he encourages further investigation.

Woodward contacts a senior government official, an anonymous source he has used before and refers to as "Deep Throat". Communicating secretly, using a flag placed in a balcony flowerpot to signal meetings, they meet at night in an underground parking garage. Deep Throat speaks vaguely and with metaphors, avoiding substantial facts about the Watergate break-in, but promises to keep Woodward on the right path to the truth, advising Woodward to "follow the money".

Woodward and Bernstein connect the five burglars to corrupt activities involving campaign contributions to Nixon's Committee to Re-elect the President (CRP or CREEP). This includes a check for $25,000 paid by Kenneth H. Dahlberg, who Miami authorities identified when investigating the Miami-based burglars. However, Bradlee and others at the Post still doubt the investigation and its dependence on sources such as Deep Throat, wondering why the Nixon administration should break the law when the president is almost certain to defeat his opponent, Democratic nominee George McGovern.

Through former CREEP treasurer Hugh W. Sloan Jr., Woodward and Bernstein connect a slush fund of hundreds of thousands of dollars to White House chief of staff H. R. Haldeman—"the second most important man in this country"—and to former attorney general John N. Mitchell, now head of CREEP. They learn that CREEP was financing a "ratfucking" campaign to sabotage Democratic presidential candidates a year before the Watergate burglary, when Nixon was lagging Edmund Muskie in the polls.

While Bradlee's demand for thoroughness compels the reporters to obtain other sources to confirm the Haldeman connection, the White House issues a non-denial denial of the Post's above-the-fold story. Bradlee continues to encourage investigation.

Woodward again meets secretly with Deep Throat and demands that he be less evasive. Very reluctantly, Deep Throat reveals that Haldeman masterminded the Watergate break-in and cover-up. He also states the cover-up was not only intended to camouflage the CREEP involvement, but also to hide "covert operations" involving "the entire U.S. intelligence community", including the CIA and Federal Bureau of Investigation (FBI). He warns Woodward and Bernstein that their lives, and those of others, are in danger. When the two relay this information to Bradlee and tell him of the depth of the conspiracy, Bradlee realizes that a constitutional crisis is coming, but tells them to move forward with the story.

During the second inauguration of Richard Nixon on January 20, 1973, Bernstein and Woodward type the full story, while a television in the newsroom shows Nixon taking the oath of office for his second term as president. A montage of Watergate-related teletype headlines from the following years is shown, ending with the report of Nixon's resignation and the inauguration of Gerald Ford on August 9, 1974.

== Cast ==
- Dustin Hoffman as Carl Bernstein
- Robert Redford as Bob Woodward
- Jack Warden as Harry M. Rosenfeld
- Martin Balsam as Howard Simons
- Hal Holbrook as Deep Throat
- Jason Robards as Ben Bradlee
- Jane Alexander as The Bookkeeper
- Stephen Collins as Hugh W. Sloan Jr.
- Ned Beatty as Martin Dardis
- Meredith Baxter as Deborah Murray Sloan
- Penny Fuller as Sally Aiken (based on Marilyn Berger)
- Penny Peyser as Sharon Lyons
- Lindsay Crouse as Kay Eddy
- Robert Walden as Donald Segretti
- F. Murray Abraham as Sergeant Paul Leeper (based on Paul W. Leeper, Metropolitan Police Department of the District of Columbia)
- David Arkin as Eugene Bachinski
- Richard Herd as James W. McCord, Jr. (Watergate Burglar)
- Henry Calvert as Bernard Barker (Watergate Burglar)
- Dominic Chianese as Eugenio Martínez (Watergate Burglar)
- Ron Hale as Frank Sturgis (Watergate Burglar)
- Nate Esformes as Virgilio R. Gonzales (Watergate Burglar)
- Nicolas Coster as Markham (based on Douglas Caddy)
- Joshua Shelley as Al Lewis
- Ralph Williams as Ray Steuben
- Gene Lindsey as Alfred D. Baldwin (distracted Watergate "look-out")
- Polly Holliday as Dardis's secretary
- Carol Trost as Ben Bradlee's secretary
- James Karen as Hugh Sloan's attorney
- Basil Hoffman as Assistant Metro Editor
- Stanley Bennett Clay as Assistant Metro Editor
- John McMartin as Foreign Editor
- John Devlin as Metro Editor
- Paul Lambert as National Editor
- Richard Venture as Assistant Metro Editor
- John Furlong as News Desk Editor
- Valerie Curtin as Miss Milland
- Jess Osuna as Joe (FBI agent)
- Allyn Ann McLerie as Carolyn Abbott
- Christopher Murray as Photo Aide
- Frank Wills as himself (the actual security guard at the Watergate complex)
- Cara Duff-MacCormick as Tammy Ulrich (uncredited)
- John Randolph as John Mitchell (voice) (uncredited)

== Differences from the book ==
Unlike the book, the film covers only the first seven months of the Watergate scandal, from the time of the break-in to Nixon's second inauguration on January 20, 1973. The film introduced the catchphrase "follow the money" in relation to the case, which did not appear in the book or in any Watergate documentation.

== Production ==
Redford began asking about the Watergate break-in while promoting The Candidate, then read Woodward and Bernstein's Watergate stories in The Washington Post, while waiting to start filming The Way We Were. Redford first spoke with Woodward in November 1972, after the reporters' well-publicized mistake about Hugh Sloan implicating Haldeman in his testimony to the Watergate grand jury.

Redford bought the rights to Woodward and Bernstein's book in 1974 for $450,000, with the idea to adapt it into a film with a budget of $5 million. Ben Bradlee, executive editor of The Washington Post, realized that the film was going to be produced regardless of his approval, and believed it made "more sense to try to influence it factually". He hoped the film would show that newspapers "strive very hard for responsibility".

Redford hired William Goldman to write the script in 1974. Goldman has said that Woodward was extremely helpful to him but that Bernstein was not. Goldman wrote that his crucial decision regarding the screenplay's structure was to discard the second half of the book. After he delivered his first draft in August 1974, Warner Bros. agreed to finance the film.

Redford was not happy with Goldman's first draft. Woodward and Bernstein read it and also did not like it. Redford asked for their suggestions, but Bernstein and his then-girlfriend, writer Nora Ephron, wrote their own draft. Redford showed this draft to Goldman, suggesting that it might contain some material he could integrate, but Goldman later called Redford's acceptance of the Bernstein-Ephron draft a "gutless betrayal". Redford later expressed dissatisfaction with the Bernstein-Ephron draft, saying, "A lot of it was sophomoric and way off the beat." According to Goldman, "In what they wrote, Bernstein was sure catnip to the ladies." He also said that one of Bernstein and Ephron's scenes was included in the final film; a bit in which Bernstein deceives a secretary in an attempt to see someone, which was not factually true.

Alan J. Pakula was hired to direct and requested rewrites from Goldman. In a 2011 biography, Redford claimed that he and Pakula held all-day sessions working on the script. Pakula spent hours interviewing editors and reporters, taking notes of their comments.

In 2011, Richard Stayton, Los Angeles Times drama critic and playwright, wrote an article for the Writers Guild of America West magazine, Written By as its editor, following his comparison of many drafts of the script, including the final production draft. He concluded that Redford's and Pakula's contributions were not significant, that Goldman was properly credited as the writer, and that the final draft had "William Goldman's distinct signature on each page".

=== Casting ===
Redford first selected Al Pacino to play Bernstein, but later decided that Dustin Hoffman was a better fit for the role.

Jason Robards was always Redford's choice to play Ben Bradlee. However, Bradlee had recommended George C. Scott for the role, and he was somewhat unimpressed when Robards visited the Post offices to develop a feel for the newsroom. In advance of the shoot, Bradlee told Robards, "Just don't make me look like an asshole." At first, Pakula was worried that Robards could not carry Bradlee's easy elegance and command authority. Karl Malden, Hal Holbrook (who would ultimately play Deep Throat), John Forsythe, Leslie Nielsen, Henry Fonda, Richard Widmark, Christopher Plummer, Anthony Quinn, Gene Hackman, Burt Lancaster, Robert Stack, Robert Mitchum and Telly Savalas were also considered for the role.

Character actor Martin Balsam played managing editor Howard Simons. According to Bradlee, Simons felt that his involvement with the real story was greatly diminished in the script.

Bradlee teased Post publisher Katharine Graham about who would play her in the film. "Names like Katharine Hepburn, Lauren Bacall and Patricia Neal were tossed out — by us — to make her feel good," Bradlee said. "And names like Edna May Oliver or Marie Dressler, if it felt like teasing time. And then her role was dropped from the final script, half to her relief."

Redford and Hoffman divided top billing, with Redford billed above Hoffman in the posters and trailers, and Hoffman billed above Redford in the film itself (in precisely the same manner in which James Stewart and John Wayne had divided top billing for John Ford's The Man Who Shot Liberty Valance in 1962).

=== Filming ===
Hoffman and Redford visited The Washington Post's offices for months, attending news conferences and conducting research for their roles. Because the Post denied the production permission to shoot in its newsroom, set designers took measurements of the newspaper's offices and took many photographs. Boxes of trash were gathered and transported to sets recreating the newsroom on two soundstages in Hollywood's Burbank Studios for $200,000. The filmmakers went to great lengths for accuracy and authenticity, including making replicas of outdated phone books. Nearly 200 desks were purchased for $500 each from the same firm that had sold desks to the Post in 1971. The desks were painted the same color as those in the newsroom. The production was supplied with a brick from the main lobby of the Post so that it could be duplicated in fiberglass for the set. Principal photography began May 12, 1975, in Washington, D.C.

== Release ==
All the President's Men was initially assigned an R rating by the Motion Picture Association of America (MPAA) due to multiple uses of the word "fuck" and its derivatives. Warner Bros. Pictures and Robert Redford appealed the decision, arguing that the film's subject matter and historical importance warranted a lower rating. The MPAA Appeals Board, requiring a two-thirds majority to overturn a rating, agreed and reclassified the film as PG (the PG-13 rating did not exist at the time, as it was created in 1984). MPAA president Jack Valenti later stated that the film would have received a G rating if not for the profanity. According to MPAA official Richard Heffner, the Appeals Board considered the language to be contextually appropriate given the film's journalistic and educational significance. The decision exemplified the MPAA's ability to exercise discretion in its ratings process, particularly for films regarded as culturally or historically important.

== Reception ==
=== Box office ===
All the President's Men grossed $7,016,001 from 604 theaters in its first week, placing it atop the U.S. box office. It eventually grossed $70.6 million at the box office.

=== Critical reception ===
All the President's Men has received near-universal acclaim from many film critics, both on its release and in the years immediately following it. On the review aggregator website Rotten Tomatoes, the film holds an approval rating of 95% based on 76 reviews. The website's critics consensus reads, "A taut, solidly acted paean to the benefits of a free press and the dangers of unchecked power, made all the more effective by its origins in real-life events." On Metacritic, which assigns a weighted average score out of 100 to reviews from mainstream critics, the film received an average score of 84, based on reviews from 18 critics, indicating "universal acclaim".

==== Initial reviews ====
At the time of the film's release, Roger Ebert of the Chicago Sun-Times awarded the film 3½ stars out of 4, writing: "It provides the most observant study of working journalists we're ever likely to see in a feature film. And it succeeds brilliantly in suggesting the mixture of exhilaration, paranoia, self-doubt, and courage that permeated The Washington Post as its two young reporters went after a presidency." Variety praised the "ingenious direction [...] and scripting" that overcame the difficult lack of drama that a story about reporters running down a story might otherwise have. Gene Siskel gave the film four stars. In his Chicago Tribune review, he wrote, "Director Alan J. Pakula duplicates the surprise and suspense of his Klute while avoiding the overstatement and pandering paranoia of his more recent political thriller, The Parallax View. Pakula's greatest achievement is the way he unobtrusively weaves outside events into narrative of the reporters' story." Siskel also named it the best film of 1976 on his year-end list.

Vincent Canby of The New York Times wrote, "Newspapers and newspapermen have long been favorite subjects for movie makers—a surprising number of whom are former newspapermen, yet not until All The President's Men, the riveting screen adaptation of the Watergate book by Carl Bernstein and Bob Woodward, has any film come remotely close to being an accurate picture of American journalism at its best." Rex Reed wrote, "Just to think about Watergate (and there are those, I'm told, who prefer not to) is to chatter the brain with a million details, telephone conversations, notebook jottings, investigations and technical problems that could be very dull indeed on film. Awesomely, and with tremendous intelligence, Alan Pakula, the director, has assembled each element with the panache of a mystery novelist. The result is a movie that literally keeps the audience glued to the edge of the seat with nail-biting tension and excitement." Kathleen Carroll of the New York Daily News gave the film a full four-star rating and wrote that it "offers a rousing argument for the preservation of freedom of the press that precious right that allows reporters like Bob Woodward and Carl Bernstein to ferret out the truth." Charles Champlin of the Los Angeles Times called it "quite beyond anything else, an engrossing mystery movie, with atmosphere, suspense, surprise, conflict, danger, secret messages, clandestine meetings, heroes, villains and a cast of leading and supporting characters that might have emerged from an unlikely collaboration of, let us say, Gore Vidal and Raymond Chandler."

Desmond Ryan of The Philadelphia Inquirer called it "not only a stunningly accurate account of the way big-city newspapers operate, down to the last paper clip and derisive curse, but it is also a superlative movie by any standard. The acting from Redford and Dustin Hoffman as Bob Woodward and Carl Bernstein is immaculate and understated, and it is matched right down to the last bit part. It is equalled by Alan Pakula's high-tension direction and William Goldman's tautly accurate screenplay." Stanley Eichelbaum of the San Francisco Examiner wrote, "People should enjoy it, since it has the knockout force of an American Z, without the heavy doses of manipulative melodrama. It's eminently entertaining, providing much the same fascination and wry humor as The Front Page, a romantic treatment of the same aspects of competitive, relentlessly aggressive journalism. The film's brilliance largely emanates from the lean, astringent, compellingly realistic, quasi-documentary style brought to it by director Alan J. Pakula (Klute, The Parallax View, etc.) and screenwriter William Goldman. Like the book, the film has the hypnotic impact of a detective thriller in its sharp, subtle retelling of the involved story of the Watergate break-in and Woodward and Bernstein's role in unraveling the cover-up."

Susan Stark of the Detroit Free Press wrote, "The circuitous, sometimes perilous, nearly always frustrating adventure of the two newsmen who broke the conspiracy of silence about the Watergate scandals makes one terrific chunk of material for a movie, Wisely, Robert Redford, who acquired screen right to the book even before it was published, stuck to his gun, leaning hard on the dramatic, as opposed to the political elements in the material. The hard dramatic approach of the film, envisioned by Redford and executed with consummate skill by Alan J. Pakula, works wondrously well, from just about any point of view. In aesthetic terms, it works because the film carries no unnecessary expository baggage. No one is preaching here; no one is pushing a message, except by implication." Joe Pollack of the St. Louis Post-Dispatch wrote, "Making a movie hero out of an investigative newspaper reporter is an extremely difficult task. Investigative reporting simply isn't very exciting, nor very dramatic. It involves a lengthy search for sources and tedious checking and cross-checking of facts, combined with an amount of telephone-calling and door-knocking that can become very dull. All the President's Men has turned these potential minuses into gigantic pluses, and comes through as a wonderful motion picture, one that explores the abuses of power and the work of the free press with a mighty magnifying glass. It glorifies the work of the reporter without making it glamorous." Sally Smith of The Atlanta Constitution said, "A 'reporter' movie in the tradition of the '30s and '40s it is not. There are no fast-talking, cigar-chewing editors, no screaming telephones and no thundering presses. 'Scoop' is never mentioned. Instead, the film is close to a dramatized documentary. For those in the audience expecting an emotional catharsis it may be slightly disappointing, but this low-key realism – as opposed to being a shrill polemic against Nixon – is why the movie works."

Clyde Gilmour of the Toronto Star called it a "fascinating movie from Warner Bros. [that] vividly but scrupulously dramatizes the almost mythological exploits of the men who uncovered the Big Cover-Up. And it does this while portraying the often-distorted world of a big-city newspaper with an honesty and fidelity seldom, if ever, approached in previous films about the press." Martin Malina of the Montreal Star called it "the biggest and the best portrait of newspaper reporting that Hollywood has yet achieved." Dave Lanken of the Montreal Gazette called it "a good picture and one that will undoubtedly do very well. It will both satisfy and create continuing interest in the comeuppance of the world's highest elected crime overlord." Michael Walsh of The Province wrote, "Watergate challenged the free press and produced one of journalism's finest hours. All the President's Men insures [sic] that its lessons will be understood and remembered."

Internationally, Patrick Gibbs of The Daily Telegraph wrote, "Mr Pakula places implicit confidence in this story, tightly scripted by William Goldman, with only an occasional fictional touch and in his experienced actors led by Robert Redford and Dustin Hoffman as the two reporters, though no great feats are called for in the way of interpretation." Colin Bennett of The Age wrote, "Documentary is the best way to tackle a story that's so incredibly close, if it is to be made into entertainment at all. So it's a handicap that two film stars, rather than unknown faces, were deemed necessary to mime Woodstein's astonishment as each new fragment of thread in the pattern is revealed. Characterisation is totally unimportant, however; and the two actors play it straight, sans heroics, concentrating on the stunning business in hand, the only business that really matters." Romola Costantino of The Sun-Herald remarked, "This movie is sure to be a great success, but it won't necessarily be because of its brilliant reconstruction of the Watergate story. Most people have forgotten about that by now. As for the impressive skill of direction, the realistic, clear dialogue, or the fact that it relives, with mounting suspense, one of the most incredible scandals of this century not even these could have ensured this film's success away from America. There's no sex, no violence, and most of it is telephone calls or takes place behind office desks. But it can't miss, because it also offers two hours in the company of those charismatic stars, Dustin Hoffmann [sic] and Robert Redford, as the dedicated newspaper reporters, Carl Bernstein and Bob Woodward, from the Washington Post, who were responsible for the whole shake-up."

==== Retrospective reviews ====
The film continued to receive acclaim long after its release. Chris Nashawaty of Entertainment Weekly, reviewing Blu-ray releases of both this film and Network in 2011, called it "a victory lap for American journalism – the triumphant flip side to Network's self-loathing take on the media. It also anticipated our current WikiLeaks era, with Robert Redford (Woodward) and Dustin Hoffman (Bernstein) milking anonymous sources and burning shoe leather to speak truth to power. These films are timeless and essential, raising thorny questions we're still struggling to answer 35 years later. That must have been heavy stuff to be hit with at the multiplex in 1976. Maybe that's why Rocky walked away with Best Picture." In a rare dissenting review published in 1985, Dave Kehr of the Chicago Reader was critical of the writing, calling the film "pedestrian" and "a study in missed opportunities".

== Accolades ==
- In 2015, The Hollywood Reporter polled hundreds of Academy members, asking them to revote on past controversial decisions. Academy members indicated that, given a second chance, they would award the 1977 Oscar for Best Picture to All the President's Men instead of to Rocky.
- It became one of the seven films to win Best Picture from three out of four major U.S. film critics' groups (LA, NBR, NY, NSFC), along with Nashville, Terms of Endearment, Goodfellas, Pulp Fiction, The Hurt Locker and Drive My Car.
- In 2007, Entertainment Weekly ranked All the President's Men as one of its 25 Powerful Political Thrillers.
- In 2006, Writers Guild of America West ranked William Goldman's screenplay 53rd in WGA’s list of 101 Greatest Screenplays.
- In 2016, the Directors Guild of America ranked the film 72nd on its list of The 80 Best-Directed Films since the Guild’s founding in 1936.

| Award | Category | Nominee(s) | Result | Ref. |
|---|---|---|---|---|
| Academy Awards | Best Picture | Walter Coblenz | Nominated | |
| Academy Awards | Best Director | Alan J. Pakula | Nominated | |
| Academy Awards | Best Supporting Actor | Jason Robards | Won | |
| Academy Awards | Best Supporting Actress | Jane Alexander | Nominated | |
| Academy Awards | Best Screenplay – Based on Material from Another Medium | William Goldman | Won | |
| Academy Awards | Best Art Direction | Art Direction: George C. Jenkins; Set Decoration: George Gaines | Won | |
| Academy Awards | Best Film Editing | Robert L. Wolfe | Nominated | |
| Academy Awards | Best Sound | Arthur Piantadosi, Les Fresholtz, Dick Alexander, and James E. Webb | Won | |
| American Cinema Editors Awards | Best Edited Feature Film | Robert L. Wolfe | Nominated | |
| British Academy Film Awards | Best Film | | Nominated | |
| British Academy Film Awards | Best Direction | Alan J. Pakula | Nominated | |
| British Academy Film Awards | Best Actor in a Leading Role | Dustin Hoffman | Nominated | |
| British Academy Film Awards | Best Actor in a Supporting Role | Martin Balsam | Nominated | |
| British Academy Film Awards | Best Actor in a Supporting Role | Jason Robards | Nominated | |
| British Academy Film Awards | Best Screenplay | William Goldman | Nominated | |
| British Academy Film Awards | Best Cinematography | Gordon Willis | Nominated | |
| British Academy Film Awards | Best Editing | Robert L. Wolfe | Nominated | |
| British Academy Film Awards | Best Production Design | George C. Jenkins | Nominated | |
| British Academy Film Awards | Best Soundtrack | Milton Burrow, Jim Webb, Les Fresholtz, Arthur Piantadosi, and Dick Alexander | Nominated | |
| Directors Guild of America Awards | Outstanding Directorial Achievement in Motion Pictures | Alan J. Pakula | Nominated | |
| Golden Globe Awards | Best Motion Picture – Drama | | Nominated | |
| Golden Globe Awards | Best Director – Motion Picture | Alan J. Pakula | Nominated | |
| Golden Globe Awards | Best Supporting Actor – Motion Picture | Jason Robards | Nominated | |
| Golden Globe Awards | Best Screenplay – Motion Picture | William Goldman | Nominated | |
| Kansas City Film Critics Circle Awards | Best Supporting Actor | Jason Robards | Won | |
| National Board of Review Awards | Top Ten Films | | Won | |
| National Board of Review Awards | Best Film | | Won | |
| National Board of Review Awards | Best Director | Alan J. Pakula | Won | |
| National Board of Review Awards | Best Supporting Actor | Jason Robards | Won | |
| National Film Preservation Board | National Film Registry | | Inducted | |
| National Society of Film Critics Awards | Best Film | | Won | |
| National Society of Film Critics Awards | Best Director | Alan J. Pakula | 2nd Place | |
| National Society of Film Critics Awards | Best Supporting Actor | Jason Robards | Won | |
| New York Film Critics Circle Awards | Best Film | | Won | |
| New York Film Critics Circle Awards | Best Director | Alan J. Pakula | Won | |
| New York Film Critics Circle Awards | Best Supporting Actor | Jason Robards | Won | |
| Online Film & Television Association Awards | Film Hall of Fame: Productions | | Inducted | |
| Writers Guild of America Awards | Best Drama – Adapted from Another Medium | William Goldman | Won | |

=== American Film Institute ===
- AFI's 100 Years... 100 Thrills – #57
- AFI's 100 Years... 100 Heroes and Villains:
  - Bob Woodward and Carl Bernstein – #27 Heroes
- AFI's 100 Years...100 Cheers – #34
- AFI's 100 Years...100 Movies: 10th Anniversary Edition – #77

== "All the President's Men" Revisited ==
Sundance Productions, which Redford owned, produced a two-hour documentary titled "All the President's Men" Revisited. Broadcast on Discovery Channel Worldwide April 21, 2013, the documentary focuses on the Watergate case and the subsequent film adaptation. It simultaneously recounts how The Washington Post broke Watergate and how the scandal unfolded, going behind the scenes of the film. It explores how the Watergate scandal would be covered in the present day, whether such a scandal could happen again and who Richard Nixon was as a man. W. Mark Felt, deputy director of the FBI during the early 1970s, revealed his identity as Deep Throat in 2005, and this is also covered in the documentary.

Footage from the film is included, as are interviews with Redford and Hoffman, as well as with real-life central characters, including Woodward, Bernstein, Bradlee, John Dean, Alexander Butterfield and Fred Thompson, who served as minority counsel to the Senate Watergate Committee, in his first major public appearance. Contemporary media figures, such as Tom Brokaw (who was NBC News' White House correspondent during the scandal), Jill Abramson, Rachel Maddow and Jon Stewart are also featured in the documentary, which earned a 2013 Emmy nomination for Outstanding Documentary or Nonfiction Special.

== See also ==
- List of 1970s films based on actual events
- The Final Days (1989 film)
- The Post (film)
- All the Prime Minister's Men, 2021 documentary

== Bibliography and further reading ==
- Goldman, William (1989). Adventures in the Screen Trade (Reissue ed.). Grand Central Publishing. ISBN 978-0446391177.
- All The President's Men essay by Mike Canning at National Film Registry
- Slovick, Matt (1996). "'All the President's Men'". The Washington Post.
- "Cinema: Watergate on Film". Time. March 29, 1976. Archived from the original on September 22, 2008.
- Lyman, Rick (February 16, 2001). "WATCHING MOVIES WITH/Steven Soderbergh; Follow the Muse: Inspiration To Balance Lofty and Light". The New York Times.
- Savlov, Marc (April 15, 2011). "From the Watergate Break-in to a Broken News Media". The Austin Chronicle.
- Ann Hornaday, "The 34 best political movies ever made" The Washington Post (Jan. 23, 2020), ranked No. 2
