= 1977 Academy Awards =

1977 Academy Awards may refer to:

- 49th Academy Awards, the Academy Awards ceremony that took place in 1977
- 50th Academy Awards, the 1978 ceremony honoring the best in film for 1977
