= 29th Writers Guild of America Awards =

29th WGA Awards
- Date: 1977
- Organized by: Writers Guild of America, East and the Writers Guild of America, West

The 29th Writers Guild of America Awards honored the best film writers and television writers of 1976. Winners were announced in 1977.

== Winners and nominees ==
=== Film ===
Winners are listed first highlighted in boldface.

**Best Drama Written Directly for the Screen**: **Network, Written by Paddy Chayefsky**; The Omen, Written by David Seltzer; Rocky, Written by Sylvester Stallone; Taxi Driver, Written by Paul Schrader; The Front, Written by Walter Bernstein	**Best Comedy Written Directly for the Screen**: **The Bad News Bears, Written by Bill Lancaster**; Murder by Death, Written by Neil Simon; Next Stop, Greenwich Village, Written by Paul Mazursky; Silent Movie, Written by Mel Brooks, Ron Clark, Rudy De Luca and Barry Levinson; Silver Streak, Written by Colin Higgins
**Best Drama Adapted from Another Medium**: **All the President's Men, Screenplay by William Goldman; Based on the book by Carl Bernstein and Bob Woodward**; Bound for Glory, Screenplay by Robert Getchell; Based on the autobiography by Woody Guthrie; The Seven-Per-Cent Solution, Screenplay by Nicholas Meyer; Based on the novel by Nicholas Meyer; Marathon Man, Screenplay by William Goldman, Based on his novel; The Shootist, Screenplay by Miles Hood Swarthout and Scott Hale; Based on the novel by Glendon Swarthout	**Best Comedy Adapted from Another Medium**: **The Pink Panther Strikes Again, Screenplay by Frank Waldman and Blake Edwards**; Family Plot, Screenplay by Ernest Lehman; Based on the novel by Victor Canning; Stay Hungry, Screenplay by Charles Gaines and Bob Rafelson; Based on the novel by Charles Gaines; The Bingo Long Traveling All-Stars & Motor Kings, Screenplay by Hal Barwood and Matthew Robbins; Based on the novel by William Brashler; The Ritz, Screenplay by Terrence McNally; Based on his play

=== Television ===
**Episodic Comedy**: **"Dear Sigmund" – M*A*S*H (CBS) – Alan Alda**; "Joey's Baptism" – All in the Family (CBS) – Mel Tolkin, Larry Rhine and Milt Josefsberg; "Evacuation" – Barney Miller (ABC) – Danny Arnold and Chris Hayward; "Hawkeye Get Your Gun" – M*A*S*H (CBS) – Jay Folb, and Gene Reynolds; "Mary's Insomnia" – The Mary Tyler Moore Show (CBS) – David Lloyd; "My Son, the Genius" – The Mary Tyler Moore Show (CBS) – Bob Ellison	**Episodic Drama**: **"Crossing Fox River" – Lincoln (NBC) – Loring Mandel**; "Flying Misfits" – Baa Baa Black Sheep (NBC) – Stephen J. Cannell; "The November Plan: Part 1, 2 & 3" – City of Angels (NBC) – Stephen J. Cannell and Roy Huggins; Rich Man, Poor Man - Book II (ABC) – Millard Lampell; "So Help Me God" – The Rockford Files (NBC) – Juanita Barltett
**Daytime Serials**: **Ryan's Hope (ABC) – Claire Labine, Paul Avila Mayer, Mary Munisteri and Jeffrey Lane**; Days of Our Lives (NBC) – William J. Bell, Patricia Falken Smith, Bill Rega, Margaret Stewart and Kay Lenard; The Edge of Night (ABC) – Henry Slesar	**Children's Script - Episodic & Specials**: **"Blind Sunday" – ABC Afterschool Special (ABC) – Arthur Barron**; "Big Henry and the Polka Dot Kid" – NBC Special Treat (NBC) – W.W. Lewis; Bound for Freedom (NBC) – Jan Hartman; "Part II" – God's Country (CBS) – Alfa-Betty Olsen and Marshall Efron

=== Special awards ===
Laurel Award for Screenwriting Achievement
**Samson Raphaelson**
Laurel Award for TV Writing Achievement
**Everett Greenbaum, James Fritzell**
Valentine Davies Award
**Carl Foreman**
Morgan Cox Award
**Herbert Baker**
