= Bound for Glory (1976 film) =

- Theatrical release poster by Tom Jung
- Directed by: Hal Ashby
- Screenplay by: Robert Getchell
- Based on: Bound for Glory; 1943 book by Woody Guthrie
- Produced by: Robert F. Blumofe; Harold Leventhal
- Starring: David Carradine; Ronny Cox; Melinda Dillon; Gail Strickland; Randy Quaid
- Cinematography: Haskell Wexler
- Edited by: Pembroke J. Herring; Robert C. Jones
- Music by: Leonard Rosenman (conductor and music adaptor); George Brand; Joan Biel; Guthrie Thomas; Ralph Ferraro
- Distributed by: United Artists
- Release date: December 5, 1976 (New York City)
- Running time: 147 minutes
- Country: United States
- Language: English
- Budget: $10 million or $7 million

Bound for Glory is a 1976 American biographical film directed by Hal Ashby, produced by folk music impresario and Woody Guthrie's manager Harold Leventhal and loosely adapted by Robert Getchell from Guthrie's 1943 partly fictionalized autobiography Bound for Glory. The film stars David Carradine as folk singer Woody Guthrie, with Ronny Cox, Melinda Dillon, Gail Strickland, John Lehne, Ji-Tu Cumbuka and Randy Quaid. Much of the film is based on Guthrie's attempt to humanize the desperate Okie Dust Bowl refugees in California during the Great Depression.

Bound for Glory was the first motion picture in which inventor/operator Garrett Brown used his new Steadicam for filming moving scenes. Director of photography Haskell Wexler won the Academy Award for Best Cinematography at the 49th Academy Awards.

All of the main events and characters, except for Guthrie and his first wife, Mary, are entirely fictional. The film ends with Guthrie singing his most famous song, "God Blessed America for Me" (subsequently retitled "This Land Is Your Land"), on his way to New York, but, in fact, the song was composed in New York in 1940 and forgotten by him until five years later.

== Plot ==
In 1936, amid the Great Depression, Woody Guthrie performs guitar at a gas station. A customer offers $1 to anyone who can address his worries, and Guthrie succeeds by providing a satisfactory answer. Subsequently, Guthrie begins painting a sign but frustrates his wife, Mary, by abandoning the task—their only reliable source of income—to engage in music instead. At a local bar, Guthrie performs for a woman named Sue Ann and spends the night with her. On his porch, he encounters Heavy Chandler, a recently released mental patient, and encourages him to express his thoughts through painting. After performing at a square dance, a dust storm compels everyone indoors. Guthrie suggests to Mary that he should leave to seek work, and eventually, he departs, leaving her a note.

During his travels, Guthrie rides a train with Slim Snedeger and other hobos. When a fight breaks out, Guthrie and Slim jump to another train; however, railroad enforcers compel those without money to disembark. Slim is able to afford the fare, but Guthrie, being broke, continues on foot, and they part ways. Guthrie later offends a middle-class couple who provide him a ride, leading them to drop him off. In a bar, he earns a meal by playing the piano and spends the night with a waitress. He subsequently rides with a family bound for California, but at the state border, police demand $50 for entry. Guthrie leaves the family and joins a nearby hobo camp. In Los Angeles, he meets Luther and Liz Johnson, a migrant couple struggling to find employment. Upon discovering that jobs are both scarce and poorly compensated, Guthrie offers to paint a sign at a soup kitchen, but his only recompense is a serving of soup.

Later, union organizer Ozark Bule arrives at the camp, performing union songs. When company thugs disrupt the gathering, Guthrie escapes with Ozark, who assists him in obtaining a radio job where Guthrie's songs about the working class achieve popularity. However, station owner Mr. Locke insists that Guthrie refrain from singing about unions and instead focus on entertainment. Although Guthrie initially acquiesces, he eventually resumes performing protest songs, resulting in conflict with Locke. Ultimately refusing to compromise, Guthrie is dismissed from his position. He brings Mary and their children to Los Angeles, but he feels out of place amid the wealth surrounding him. Luther, bruised from a beating, informs Guthrie that his songs provide inspiration to the laborers. Frustrated, Guthrie tears up a list of "safe" songs, leaves the studio, and resumes traveling, performing protest songs at migrant camps and factories.

While performing at a fruit-packing plant, Guthrie is assaulted by company enforcers, who destroy his guitar. Undeterred, he continues to travel by train and perform his songs. Upon returning to Los Angeles, Locke extends one final opportunity to Guthrie, but he is terminated once again after dedicating a song to farm workers. As Guthrie departs, Ozark informs him that an agent has arranged a coast-to-coast radio show for him and secured an audition at the prestigious Ambassador Hotel. Guthrie purchases toys for his children, only to discover that Mary and the girls have already left. During the hotel audition, the owner offers him a position but insists on dressing him in overalls and presenting him as part of a hillbilly act. Refusing to cater to the wealthy, Guthrie walks out, returns to the railroad yard, hops on a train, and resumes singing protest songs from the top of a boxcar, remaining true to his roots.

== Cast ==
- David Carradine as Woody Guthrie
- Ronny Cox as Ozark Bule
- Melinda Dillon as Mary Jennings Guthrie / Memphis Sue
- Gail Strickland as Pauline
- Randy Quaid as Luther Johnson
- John Lehne as Locke
- Ji-Tu Cumbuka as Slim Snedeger
- Elizabeth Macey as Liz Johnson
- Susan Vaill as Gwen Guthrie
- Wendy Schaal as Mary Jo Guthrie
- Guthrie Thomas as George Guthrie
- Allan Miller as Woody's Agent
- Mary Kay Place as Sue Ann
- M. Emmet Walsh as Trailer Driver
- Brion James as Truck Driver
- James Hong as Diner Owner

== Production ==
Arthur Krim of United Artists agreed to finance the film on the basis of Hal Ashby's reputation, even before a star had signed on.

Dustin Hoffman and Jack Nicholson both turned down the role of Woody Guthrie. Richard Dreyfuss was considered. Tim Buckley was going to be offered the part but died of a drug overdose. Ashby interviewed David Carradine but turned him down, in part because he felt Carradine was too tall. However, over time he reconsidered. "He had the right rural look and the musicianship," said Ashby. "And he had a ‘to hell with you’ attitude." Ashby later said Carradine's "to hell with you" attitude did cause him some problems during filming. "Once, when we were doing a scene, some migrant workers marched by. David started marching with them. By the time we found him, he was two miles away; and he had held up shooting for three hours.”

The railroad scenes were filmed on the Sierra Railroad. Ashby wanted a "big" freight train for the movie, as opposed to the shorter trains commonly used in filmmaking. The railroad assembled a train of 34 freight cars. Scenes taking place on the Texas panhandle that did not include views of a locomotive were filmed near Stockton, California, using diesel locomotives. Scenes showing locomotives utilized three steam locomotives owned by the Sierra Railroad, and were filmed in and around Oakdale, California, and the roundhouse scenes were filmed at what is now Railtown 1897 in Jamestown, California.

== Release ==
The film opened at the Coronet in New York City on December 5, 1976 and at the National Theater in Westwood, Los Angeles on December 9, 1976.

=== Home media ===
On February 29, 2000, Bound for Glory was released on DVD by MGM. It included dialog dubbed in French, and subtitles in French and Spanish, but no English subtitles.

In January 2016, Bound for Glory was released in Blu-ray format, in a limited edition, by Twilight Time. In April 2022, another Blu-ray was released by Sandpiper Pictures. Both versions have English subtitles.

== Reception ==
As of January 2024, Bound for Glory holds a rating of 81% on Rotten Tomatoes based on 26 reviews. The consensus summarizes: "Bound for Glory brings the Dust Bowl era to authentic life thanks to Haskell Wexler's opulent cinematography and Woody Guthrie's resonant music, capturing the American mood at the time as much as it does the folk singer's life." On Metacritic, the film has a weighted average score of 70 out of 100 based on reviews from 10 critics, indicating "generally favorable" reviews.

Film critic Roger Ebert praised the film, calling it "one of the best-looking films ever made." However, Ebert claimed the beauty of the film was often achieved at the cost of the tone.

== Accolades ==
| Award | Category | Nominee(s) | Result | Ref. |
|---|---|---|---|---|
| Academy Awards | Best Picture | Robert F. Blumofe and Harold Leventhal | Nominated | |
| Academy Awards | Best Screenplay – Based on Material from Another Medium | Robert Getchell | Nominated | |
| Academy Awards | Best Cinematography | Haskell Wexler | Won | |
| Academy Awards | Best Costume Design | William Ware Theiss | Nominated | |
| Academy Awards | Best Film Editing | Robert C. Jones and Pembroke J. Herring | Nominated | |
| Academy Awards | Best Original Song Score and Its Adaptation or Adaptation Score | Leonard Rosenman | Won | |
| Cannes Film Festival | Palme d'Or | Hal Ashby | Nominated | |
| Golden Globe Awards | Best Motion Picture – Drama | | Nominated | |
| Golden Globe Awards | Best Actor in a Motion Picture – Drama | David Carradine | Nominated | |
| Golden Globe Awards | Best Director – Motion Picture | Hal Ashby | Nominated | |
| Golden Globe Awards | New Star of the Year – Actress | Melinda Dillon | Nominated | |
| Los Angeles Film Critics Association Awards | Best Cinematography | Haskell Wexler | Won | |
| National Board of Review Awards | Best Actor | David Carradine | Won | |
| National Society of Film Critics Awards | Best Cinematography | Haskell Wexler | Won | |
| New York Film Critics Circle Awards | Best Actor | David Carradine | Runner-up | |
| Society of Camera Operators Awards | Historical Shot | Garrett Brown | Won | |
| Writers Guild of America Awards | Best Drama – Adapted from Another Medium | Robert Getchell | Nominated | |

=== American Film Institute ===
- AFI's 100 Years...100 Songs:
  - 2004: "This Land Is Your Land" – Nominated

== Soundtrack ==
The Academy Award-winning score was released internationally in 1976 by United Artists Records, in an album containing Leonard Rosenman's music and Woody Guthrie's songs with David Carradine in the vocals. In 2012, it was also released as a CD by Intrada Records, with some of the incidental cues remixed into four orchestral suites.
