= Voyage of the Damned (disambiguation) =

Voyage of the Damned is a 1976 film based on historic events of Jewish refugees unable to find safe harbor in 1939.

Voyage of the Damned may also refer to:

- "Voyage of the Damned", a 1997 Frasier episode
- "Voyage of the Damned" (Doctor Who), a 2007 Doctor Who Christmas episode

== See also ==
- Village of the Damned (disambiguation)
