= 1976 National Society of Film Critics Awards =

Annual US film award ceremony

11th NSFC Awards

January 4, 1977

Best Film:
All the President's Men

The 11th National Society of Film Critics Awards, given on 4 January 1977, honored the best filmmaking of 1976.

== Winners ==
=== Best Picture ===
1. All the President's Men
2. Taxi Driver
3. The Memory of Justice

=== Best Director ===
1. Martin Scorsese – Taxi Driver
2. Alan J. Pakula – All the President's Men
3. Éric Rohmer – The Marquise of O (Die Marquise von O...)

=== Best Actor ===
1. Robert De Niro – Taxi Driver
2. Gérard Depardieu – The Last Woman (La dernière femme)
2. William Holden – Network

=== Best Actress ===
1. Sissy Spacek – Carrie
2. Faye Dunaway – Network
3. Liv Ullmann – Face to Face (Ansikte mot ansikte)

=== Best Supporting Actor ===
1. Jason Robards – All the President's Men
2. Harvey Keitel – Taxi Driver
3. Robert Duvall – Network and The Seven-Per-Cent Solution

=== Best Supporting Actress ===
1. Jodie Foster – Taxi Driver
2. Talia Shire – Rocky
3. Marie-France Pisier – Cousin, Cousine

=== Best Screenplay ===
1. John Berger and Alain Tanner – Jonah Who Will Be 25 in the Year 2000 (Jonas qui aura 25 ans en l'an 2000)
2. Paddy Chayefsky – Network
3. Paul Mazursky – Next Stop, Greenwich Village
4. Harold Pinter – The Last Tycoon

=== Best Cinematography ===
1. Haskell Wexler – Bound for Glory
2. Néstor Almendros – The Marquise of O (Die Marquise von O...)
3. Michael Chapman – Taxi Driver

=== Special Citation ===
- Ossessione
