= 1976 Los Angeles Film Critics Association Awards =

Annual US film awards ceremony

2nd LAFCA Awards
- Date: December 21, 1976

Highlights
- Best Picture: Network and Rocky (tie)

The 2nd Los Angeles Film Critics Association Awards, given by the Los Angeles Film Critics Association on December 21, 1976, honored the best in film for 1976. The awards were presented on January 19, 1977 at the American Film Institute at Greystone Mansion.

== Winners ==
- Best Picture (tie):
  - Network
  - Rocky
- Best Director:
  - Sidney Lumet – Network
- Best Actor:
  - Robert De Niro – Taxi Driver
- Best Actress:
  - Liv Ullmann – Face to Face (Ansikte mot ansikte)
- Best Screenplay:
  - Paddy Chayefsky – Network
- Best Cinematography:
  - Haskell Wexler – Bound for Glory
- Best Music Score:
  - Bernard Herrmann – Taxi Driver
- Best Foreign Film:
  - Face to Face (Ansikte mot ansikte) • Sweden
- New Generation Award:
  - Martin Scorsese (director) and Jodie Foster (star) – Taxi Driver
- Career Achievement Award:
  - Allan Dwan
- Special Citation:
  - Marcel Ophüls – The Memory of Justice
  - Max Laemmle, for his innovative programming of specialized films in the Los Angeles community
