= Alfred E. Lewis =

American journalist

Alfred E. Lewis (April 8, 1914 – May 3, 1994) was born in Philadelphia. He was an American journalist, best known as the author of the first article in The Washington Post about the burglary at Watergate. During his 50 year career at the Post, he had over 15,000 bylines, most covering the DC Police. He started his career at New York Graphic before moving to the United Press. He joined The Washington Post in 1935 and retired in 1985. He died of cancer in 1994.

In the 1976 film about the Watergate scandal, All The President's Men, Lewis was portrayed by Joshua Shelley.
