= Joshua Shelley =

American actor (1920–1990)

Joshua Kurzweil
- Born: January 27, 1920
- Died: February 16, 1990 (aged 70)
- Occupation: Actor

Joshua Shelley (born Joshua Kurzweil; January 27, 1920 – February 16, 1990) was one of the actors blacklisted by movie studios as a result of the House Un-American Activities Committee's (HUAC) investigation of the Communist Party in Hollywood in 1952. He did not begin to again work regularly in Hollywood until 1973 when his career restarted.

== Career ==
A member of The Actors Studio from its inception in 1947, Shelley worked frequently on stage, both on and off Broadway, during his Hollywood exile. Shelley's onscreen work, both pre- and post-blacklist, was confined primarily to television. Nonetheless, two career highlights remain Shelley's enthusiastically received 1949 feature film debut in City Across the River, as well as the blacklist-related 1976 film, The Front, notable for reuniting Shelley with several fellow blacklistees, including cast members Zero Mostel, Herschel Bernardi, and Lloyd Gough, screenwriter Walter Bernstein and director Martin Ritt, the latter also a fellow Actors Studio member.

== Filmography ==
Year	Title	Role	Notes
1949	City Across the River	Theodore 'Crazy' Perrin	
1949	Yes Sir, That's My Baby	Arnold Schultze	
1974	The Front Page	Cab Driver	
1975	Funny Lady	Painter	
1975	The Apple Dumpling Gang	Phil 'Broadway Phil'	
1976	All the President's Men	Al Lewis	
1976	The Front	Sam	
1980	Little Miss Marker	Benny	
1986	Quicksilver	'Shorty'	
