= National Board of Review Awards 1976 =

Annual US film awards ceremony

48th National Board of Review Awards

December 22, 1976

Best Picture:
All the President's Men

The 48th National Board of Review Awards were announced on December 22, 1976.

== Top Ten Films ==
1. All the President's Men
2. Network
3. Rocky
4. The Last Tycoon
5. The Seven-Per-Cent Solution
6. The Front
7. The Shootist
8. Family Plot
9. Silent Movie
10. Obsession

== Top Foreign Films ==
1. The Marquise of O
2. Face to Face
3. Small Change
4. Cousin Cousine
5. The Clockmaker

== Winners ==
- Best Film:
  - All the President's Men
- Best Foreign Film:
  - Face to Face
- Best Actor:
  - David Carradine - Bound for Glory
- Best Actress:
  - Liv Ullmann - Face to Face
- Best Supporting Actor:
  - Jason Robards - All the President's Men
- Best Supporting Actress:
  - Talia Shire - Rocky
- Best Director:
  - Alan J. Pakula - All the President's Men
