= Bound for Glory (book) =

1943 autobiography of Woody Guthrie

- First edition
- Author: Woody Guthrie
- Language: English
- Genre: Autobiography, Folk music
- Publisher: E.P. Dutton
- Publication date: 1943
- Publication place: United States

Bound for Glory is the partially fictionalized 1943 autobiography of folk singer and songwriter Woody Guthrie. The book describes Guthrie's childhood, his travels across the United States as a hobo on the railroad, and his recognition as a singer. Some of the experiences of fruit picking and a hobo camp are similar to those described in The Grapes of Wrath.

== Background ==
Originally published in 1943, it was republished with a foreword written by Studs Terkel following the 1976 film adaptation. The book was completed with the patient editing assistance of Guthrie's wife, Marjorie, and was first published by E.P. Dutton in 1943. Clifton Fadiman, reviewing the book in The New Yorker, said "Someday people are going to wake up to the fact that Woody Guthrie and the ten thousand songs that leap and tumble off the strings of his music box are a national possession, like Yellowstone and Yosemite, and part of the best stuff this country has to show the world."

== Legacy ==
Folksinger Phil Ochs wrote a tribute song to Guthrie titled "Bound for Glory", which was featured on his 1964 studio album All the News That's Fit to Sing.

A film adaptation of Bound for Glory was released in 1976.

The Boomtown Rats, an Irish rock band, took their name from Woody Guthrie's boyhood gang in the book.

Bob Dylan was greatly influenced by the work; in Dylan's own autobiography, he wrote of Bound for Glory: "I went through it cover to cover like a hurricane, totally focused on every word, and the book sang out to me like the radio."
