= Lyle J. Burbridge =

American sound engineer

- Died: January 16, 2006
- Occupation: Sound engineer
- Years active: 1970-1985

Lyle J. Burbridge (died January 16, 2006) was an American sound engineer. He was nominated for an Academy Award in the category Best Sound for the film Rocky, and for a Primetime Emmy Award for sound mixing for the TV series Fame.

== Selected filmography ==
- Rocky (1976)
