= Harold M. Etherington =

American sound engineer

- Occupation: Sound engineer
- Years active: 1971-1988

Harold M. Etherington is an American sound engineer who was nominated for an Academy Award in the category Best Sound for the film Silver Streak.

== Selected filmography ==
- Silver Streak (1976)
