= Village of the Damned =

Village of the Damned may refer to:

== Film ==
- Village of the Damned (1960 film)
- Village of the Damned (1995 film), the 1995 remake

== Literature ==
- The Midwich Cuckoos, the John Wyndham novel, also released as Village of the Damned, on which the 1960 and 1995 movies are based
- "Village of the Damned", a 2005 article by David McKie in The Guardian about Bowerchalke

== Music ==
- Village of the Damned (soundtrack), the soundtrack to the 1995 film
- "Village of the Damned" (song), a 2004 song by The Hacker off the album Rêves Mécaniques
- "Village of the Damned" (song), a 2014 song by Hollywood Monsters (band) off the album Big Trouble

== Television ==
- "Village of the Damned" (Scream), 2016 season 2 number 8 episode 18 of the horror TV show Scream
- "Village of the Damned" (episode), a 1991 season 2 number 13 episode 35 of Counterstrike (1990 TV series)
- "Village of the Damned" (episode), a 2001 season 2 number 2 TV episode of Scariest Places on Earth; see List of Scariest Places on Earth episodes
- Village of the Damned (mini-series), a 2008 TV mini-series in the TV show Most Haunted from North Wales Hospital in Denbigh
- Village of the Damned: Welcome to Dryden, a 2017 TV documentary series about Dryden

== Other uses ==
- "Village of the Damned: The Nithari Child Murders", an episode of the podcast RedHanded about the 2006 Noida serial murders in India
- "The Village of the Damned", a fictional location from the 1998 videogame Of Light and Darkness: The Prophecy
