= Network (1976 film) =

1976 film directed by Sidney Lumet

- Theatrical release poster
- Directed by: Sidney Lumet
- Written by: Paddy Chayefsky
- Produced by: Howard Gottfried; Fred C. Caruso
- Starring: Faye Dunaway; William Holden; Peter Finch; Robert Duvall
- Narrated by: Lee Richardson
- Cinematography: Owen Roizman
- Edited by: Alan Heim
- Music by: Elliot Lawrence
- Production company: Metro-Goldwyn-Mayer
- Distributed by: United Artists
- Release date: November 14, 1976 (New York)
- Running time: 121 minutes
- Country: United States
- Language: English
- Budget: $3.8 million
- Box office: $23.7 million

Network is a 1976 American satirical black comedy drama film directed by Sidney Lumet and written by Paddy Chayefsky. It depicts a television network struggling with poor ratings until the nightly live broadcast of its longtime news anchor Howard Beale (Peter Finch) inadvertently showcases his breakdown into increasingly psychotic behavior, which makes his show a surprise hit. Alongside Finch (in his final role), the film stars Faye Dunaway, William Holden, Robert Duvall, Wesley Addy, Ned Beatty, and Beatrice Straight.

Produced by Metro-Goldwyn-Mayer and released by United Artists on November 14, 1976, Network was a commercial success, earning $23.7 million on a $3.8 million production budget. Network received widespread critical acclaim, with particular praise for its screenplay and performances. At the 49th Academy Awards, it received ten nominations, including Best Picture, and won four: Best Actor for Finch (posthumously), Best Actress for Dunaway, Best Supporting Actress for Straight, and Best Original Screenplay for Chayefsky.

In 2000, Network was selected for preservation in the National Film Registry by the Library of Congress as being "culturally, historically, or aesthetically significant". In 2002, it was inducted into the Producers Guild of America Hall of Fame as a film that has "set an enduring standard for American entertainment". In 2005 the Writers Guild of America voted Chayefsky's screenplay one of the 10 greatest in history. In 2007, the film was 64th among the 100 greatest American films as chosen by the American Film Institute.

== Plot ==
In September 1975, Howard Beale, the longtime anchor for the evening news program on the Union Broadcasting System (UBS), learns from friend and news division president Max Schumacher that he has just two more weeks on the air due to declining ratings. The following night, Beale announces to his audience that he will kill himself on next Tuesday's newscast. UBS tries to immediately fire Beale, but Schumacher intervenes so that he can have a dignified farewell. Beale promises to apologize for his outburst, but once on the air, he launches into a rant about life being "bullshit". Beale's outburst causes ratings to spike, and much to Schumacher's dismay, UBS executives decide to exploit the situation. When Beale's ratings soon top out, programming chief Diana Christensen reaches out to Schumacher with an offer to help "develop" Beale's show. He declines the professional proposal but accepts her more personal pitch; the two begin an affair.

When Schumacher decides to end Beale's "angry man" format, Christensen persuades her boss, Frank Hackett, to slot the evening newscast under the entertainment division so she can develop it. Hackett bullies UBS executives to consent and fire Schumacher. In one impassioned diatribe, Beale galvanizes the nation, persuading viewers to shout, "I'm as mad as hell, and I'm not going to take this anymore!" from their windows. He is soon hosting a new program called The Howard Beale Show, top-billed as "the mad prophet of the airwaves". The show becomes the highest rated program on television, and Beale finds new celebrity preaching his angry populist message in front of a live studio audience that, on cue, chants his signature catchphrase. Schumacher and Christensen's romance withers as the show flourishes, but in the flush of high ratings, the two ultimately find their way back together; Schumacher separates from his wife of over 25 years for Christensen.

Seeking another hit, Christensen cuts a deal with a terrorist group called the Ecumenical Liberation Army (ELA) for a new reality television series, The Mao Tse-Tung Hour, for which the ELA will provide exclusive footage of their activities. Meanwhile, Beale discovers that Communications Corporation of America (CCA), the parent company of UBS, will be bought out by a larger Saudi conglomerate. He urges his audience to pressure the White House to quash the deal. This panics UBS executives because the network's debt load has made the merger essential for its survival. CCA chairman Arthur Jensen arranges a meeting with Beale, where he speculatively describes the interrelatedness of the participants in his grandiose view of the international economy and his 'corporate cosmology'. He derides, from his perspective of celebrated corporate greed, the illusory nature of nationality distinctions. Jensen scolds Beale and persuades him to abandon his message and preach a new gospel that serves Jensen's interests.

Christensen's fanatical devotion to her job and emotional emptiness ultimately drive Schumacher away, warning her that she will self-destruct if she continues on her current path. Audiences find Beale's new sermons on the dehumanization of society depressing and ratings start to slip, yet Jensen refuses to fire him. To boost the network's ratings, Christensen, Hackett and the other executives decide to hire the ELA to assassinate Beale on the air. The assassination succeeds, putting an end to The Howard Beale Show and kicking off the second season of The Mao Tse-Tung Hour. A voice-over proclaims, "This was the story of Howard Beale: the first known instance of a man who was killed because he had lousy ratings."

== Cast ==
- Faye Dunaway as Diana Christensen
- William Holden as Max Schumacher
- Peter Finch as Howard Beale
- Robert Duvall as Frank Hackett
- Wesley Addy as Nelson Chaney
- Ned Beatty as Arthur Jensen
- Jordan Charney as Harry Hunter
- Conchata Ferrell as Barbara Schlesinger
- Darryl Hickman as Bill Herron
- Roy Poole as Sam Haywood
- William Prince as Edward George Ruddy
- Beatrice Straight as Louise Schumacher
- Marlene Warfield as Laureen Hobbs
- Arthur Burghardt as Great Ahmed Kahn
- Kathy Cronkite as Mary Ann Gifford
- Ed Crowley as Joe Donnelly
- Bill Burrows as TV Director
- Stanley Grover as Jack Snowden
- Cindy Grover as Caroline Schumacher
- Lane Smith as Robert McDonough
- Ken Kercheval as Merrill Grant
- Kenneth Kimmins as Associate Producer
- Zane Lasky as Audio Man
- Michael Lombard as Willie Stein
- Sasha von Scherler as Helen Miggs
- Lance Henriksen as Network Lawyer (uncredited)
- Andrew Duncan as Agent (uncredited)

In addition, Lee Richardson provides various moments of narration advancing additional plot details.

== Production ==
=== Development and writing ===
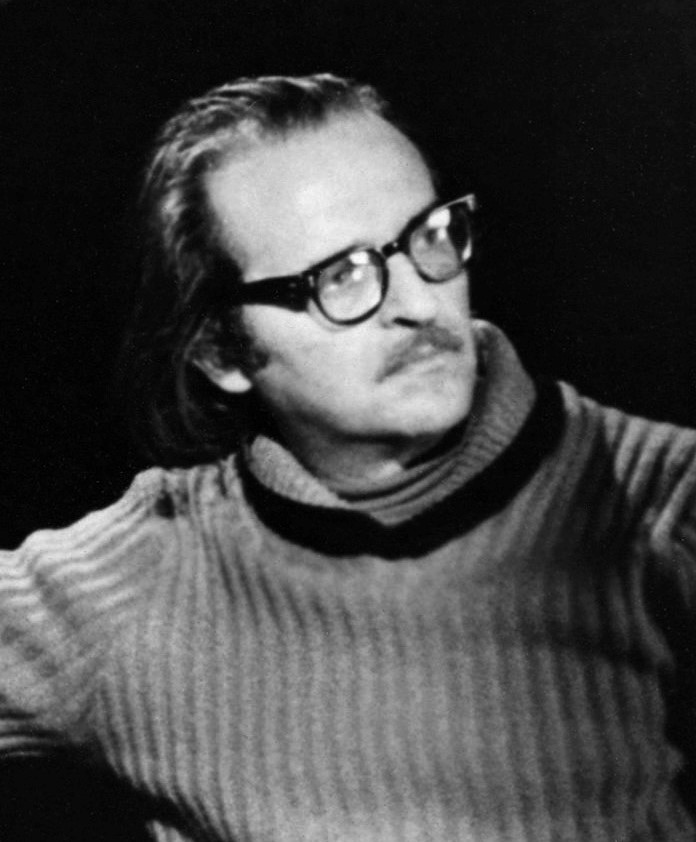
Network director Sidney Lumet in 1970.

Network came only two years after the first on-screen suicide in television history, of television news reporter Christine Chubbuck in Sarasota, Florida. The anchorwoman was suffering from depression and loneliness, was often emotionally distant from her co-workers, and shot herself on camera as stunned viewers watched on July 15, 1974. Chayefsky used the idea of a live death as his film's terminating focal point, to say later in an interview, "Television will do anything for a rating... anything!" However, Dave Itzkoff's book (Mad as Hell: The Making of Network and the Fateful Vision of the Angriest Man in Movies) allows that whether Chayefsky was inspired by the Chubbuck case remains unclear, that Chayefsky's screenplay notes on the week of the live death have nothing about the incident in them, and grants it is an eerie parallel. It was to be months later that actual direct reference was made, Chayefsky writing for Beale to bray that he "will blow my brains out right on the air ... like that girl in Florida", which was later removed. Sidney Lumet made the categorical statement that the character of Howard Beale was never based on any real-life person.

Before beginning his screenplay, Chayefsky visited network TV offices. He was surprised to learn that television executives did not watch much television. "The programs they put on 'had to' be bad, had to be something they wouldn't watch," he remarked. "Imagine having to work like that all your life." According to Dave Itzkoff, what Chayefsky saw while writing the screenplay during the midst of Watergate and the Vietnam War was the entirety of America's anger being broadcast in everything from sitcoms to news reports. He concluded that Americans "don't want jolly, happy family type shows like Eye Witness News" ... "the American people are angry and want angry shows." When he began writing his script he had intended on a comedy, but instead directed his frustration at the content being broadcast on television—which he described as "an indestructible and terrifying giant that is stronger than the government"—into the screenplay. It became a "dark satire about an unstable news anchor and a broadcasting company and a viewing public all too happy to follow him over the brink of sanity." The character of network executive Diana Christiansen was based on NBC daytime television programming executive Lin Bolen, which Bolen disputed. Chayefsky named Diana after his friend Diana Rigg.

Chayefsky and producer Howard Gottfried had just come off a lawsuit against United Artists, challenging the studio's right to lease their previous film, The Hospital, to ABC in a package with a less successful film. Despite this recent legal action, Chayefsky and Gottfried signed a deal with UA to finance Network, until UA found the subject matter too controversial and backed out. Undeterred, Chayefsky and Gottfried shopped the script around to other studios, and eventually found an interested party in Metro-Goldwyn-Mayer. Soon afterward, United Artists reversed itself and looked to co-finance the film with MGM, since the latter had an ongoing distribution arrangement with UA in North America. Since MGM agreed to let UA back on board, the former (through United Artists as per the arrangement) controlled North American/Caribbean rights, with UA opting for overseas distribution. (Note: In 1981, several years after the film's release, United Artists merged with MGM to form MGM/UA Entertainment Co. (which became the worldwide rights holder to the film from 1982 to 1986). On March 25, 1986, Ted Turner's Turner Broadcasting System acquired MGM/UA Entertainment Co., and renamed MGM Entertainment Co., however, due to concerns in the financial community over the debt-load of his companies, in August of that same year, Turner was forced to sell the MGM name, all of United Artists back to Kerkorian for approximately $300 million after only months of ownership. Turner, however kept all of MGM's film, television and cartoon library released prior to May 23, 1986 and formed Turner Entertainment Co. to handle rights to this library on August 2, 1986. In 1996, Turner Broadcasting System merged with Time Warner (now Warner Bros. Entertainment) putting the majority of the pre-May 1986 MGM library in the hands of Warner Bros. However, since Amazon MGM Studios (via United Artists) retained the rights to the film internationally, Network is in a unique position of being owned by both companies. Today, Warner Bros. (via Turner Entertainment Co.) controls the film in the North America, while Amazon MGM Studios (via United Artists) controls the film internationally.)

=== Casting ===
In his notes, Chayefsky jotted down his ideas about casting. For Howard Beale, who would eventually be played by Peter Finch, he envisioned Henry Fonda, Cary Grant, James Stewart and Paul Newman. He went so far as to write Newman, telling him that "You and a very small handful of other actors are the only ones I can think of with the range for this part." Lumet wanted Fonda, with whom he had worked several times, but Fonda declined the role, finding it too "hysterical" for his taste. Stewart also found the script unsuitable, objecting to the strong language. Early consideration was given to real-life newscasters Walter Cronkite and John Chancellor, but neither was open to the idea (both appear during the opening scene through stock footage). Although not mentioned in Chayefsky's notes, George C. Scott, Glenn Ford and William Holden reportedly also turned down the opportunity to play Beale, with Holden instead playing Max Schumacher; for that role, Chayefsky had initially listed Walter Matthau and Gene Hackman. Ford was under consideration for this part as well, and he was said to be one of two final contenders. Holden finally got the edge because of his recent box-office success with The Towering Inferno.

Producers were wary that Finch, an Australian, would not be able to sound authentically American; they demanded an audition before his casting could be considered. A well-known actor, Finch reportedly responded, "Bugger pride. Put the script in the mail." Immediately excited by the role, he agreed to pay his own fare to New York for a screen test. He prepared for the audition by listening to broadcasts by American newscasters and reading the international editions of The New York Times and the Herald Tribune into a tape recorder, then listening to playbacks with a critical ear. Gottfried recalled that Finch "was nervous as hell at that first meeting over lunch and just like a kid auditioning. Once we'd heard him, Sidney Lumet, Paddy, and I were ecstatic because we knew it was a hell of a part to cast." Finch further convinced Lumet by playing him the tapes of his newspaper readings.

Faye Dunaway wanted Robert Mitchum to play Max Schumacher, but Lumet refused, believing that Mitchum was not sufficiently urbane. For the role of Diana Christensen, Chayefsky thought of Candice Bergen, Ellen Burstyn, and Natalie Wood, while the studio suggested Jane Fonda, with alternate candidates Kay Lenz, Diane Keaton, Marsha Mason and Jill Clayburgh. Lumet wanted to cast Vanessa Redgrave in the film, but Chayefsky did not want her. Lumet argued that he thought she was the greatest English-speaking actress in the world, while Chayefsky, a proud Jew and supporter of Israel, objected on the basis of her support of the PLO. Lumet, also a Jew, said "Paddy, that's blacklisting!", to which Chayefsky replied, "Not when a Jew does it to a Gentile."

Dunaway was cast as Diana in September 1975. Lumet told her that he would edit any attempts on her part to make her character sympathetic and insisted on presenting her without any vulnerability. Lumet cast Robert Duvall as Frank Hackett. Duvall saw Hackett as a "vicious president Ford". On Duvall, Lumet said: "What's fascinating about Duvall is how funny he is." Ned Beatty was cast as Arthur Jensen on the recommendation of director Robert Altman after the original actor failed to live up to Lumet's standards. Beatty had one night to prepare a four-page speech, and was finished after one day's shooting. Beatrice Straight played Louise Schumacher, Max's wife, on whom he cheats with Diana. Straight had won a Tony Award in 1953 for playing an anguished wife who is similarly cheated on in Arthur Miller's The Crucible.

=== Filming ===
After two weeks of rehearsals, filming started in Toronto in January 1976 with many scenes filmed at the CFTO studios at 9 Channel Nine Court in Scarborough.

Lumet recalled that Chayefsky was usually on set during filming, and sometimes offered advice about how certain scenes should be played. Lumet allowed that his old friend had the better comic instincts of the two. Finch, who had suffered from heart problems for many years, became physically and psychologically exhausted by the demands of playing Beale.

There was some concern that the combination of Holden and Dunaway might create conflict on the set, since the two had sparred during an earlier co-starring stint in The Towering Inferno. According to biographer Bob Thomas, Holden had been incensed by Dunaway's behavior during the filming of the disaster epic, especially her habit of leaving him fuming on the set while she attended to her hair, makeup and telephone calls. One day, after a two-hour wait, Holden reportedly grabbed Dunaway by the shoulders, pushed her against a soundstage wall and snapped, "You do that to me once more, and I'll push you through that wall!"

Lumet and cinematographer Owen Roizman worked out a complicated lighting scheme that in Lumet's words would "corrupt the camera". Lumet recalled: "We started with an almost naturalistic look. For the first scene between Peter Finch and Bill Holden, on Sixth Avenue at night, we added only enough light to get an exposure. As the movie progressed, camera setups became more rigid, more formal. The lighting became more and more artificial. The next-to-final scene—where Faye Dunaway, Robert Duvall, and the three network gray suits decide to kill Peter Finch—is lit like a commercial. The camera setups are static and framed like still pictures. The camera had also become a victim of television."

== Release and reception ==
Network was released on November 14, 1976 at the Sutton theater in New York City. It opened on November 19 at the Regent in Westwood, Los Angeles and then on November 21 at the Paramount Theatre in New York City.

=== Box office ===
The film became one of the big hits of 1976–77, earning $23.7 million at the box office on a $3.8 million production budget.

=== Critical reception ===
The film opened to widespread critical acclaim.

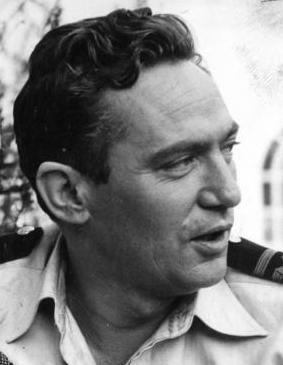
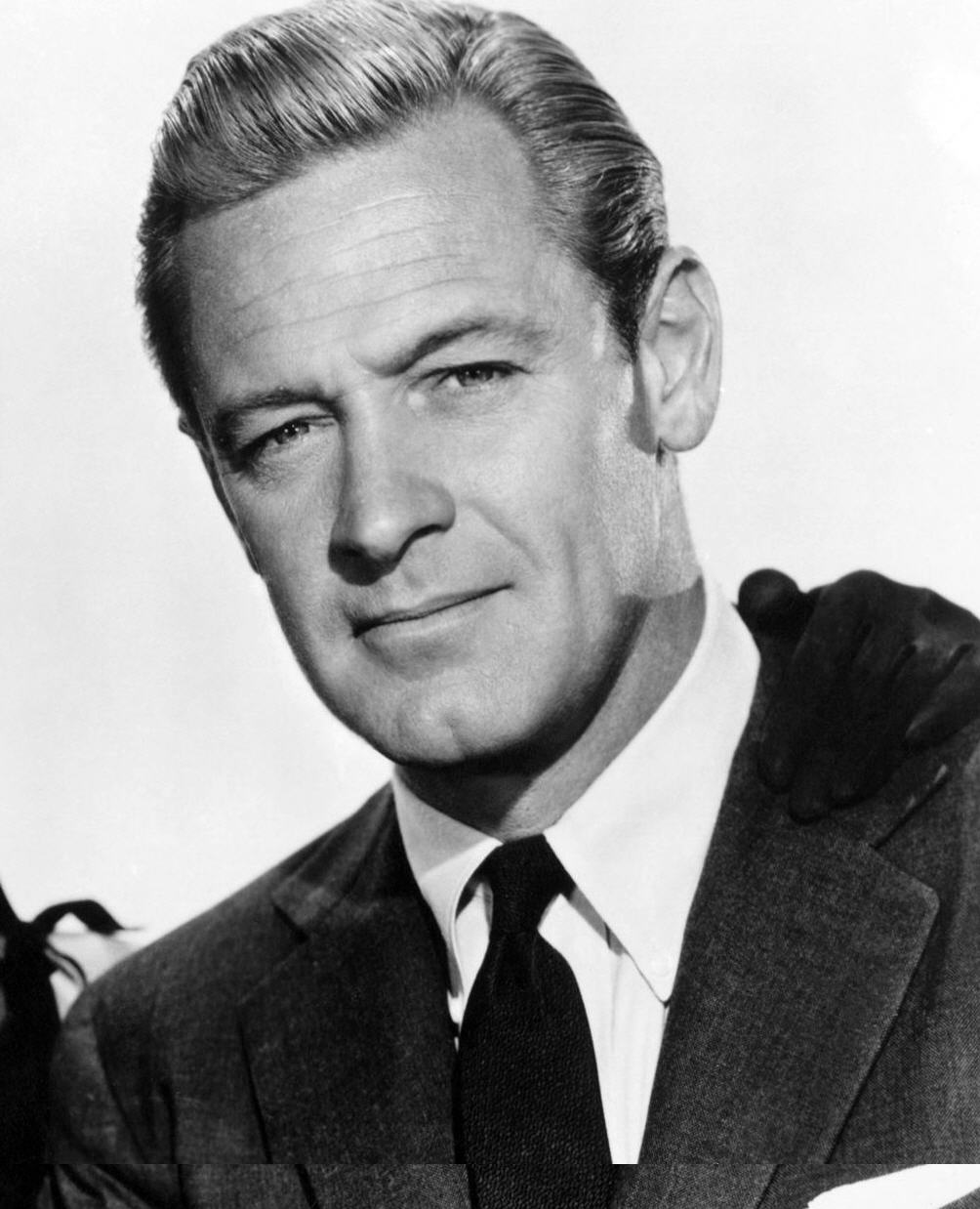
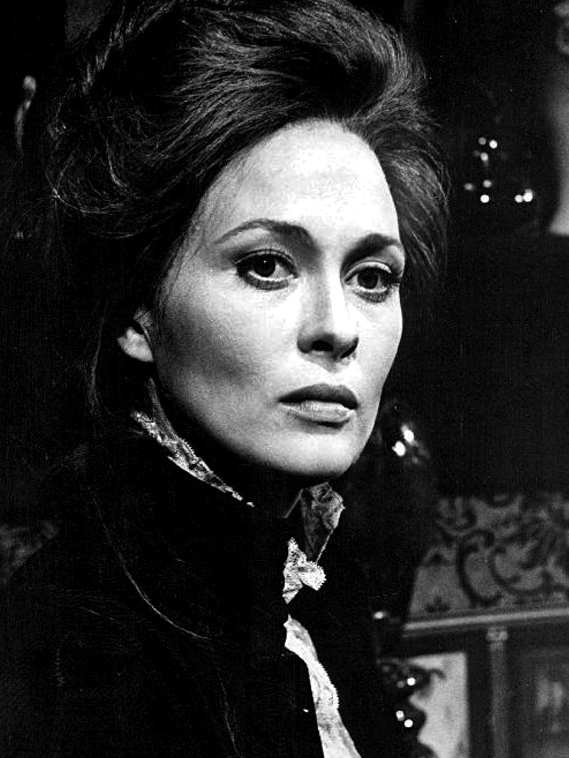
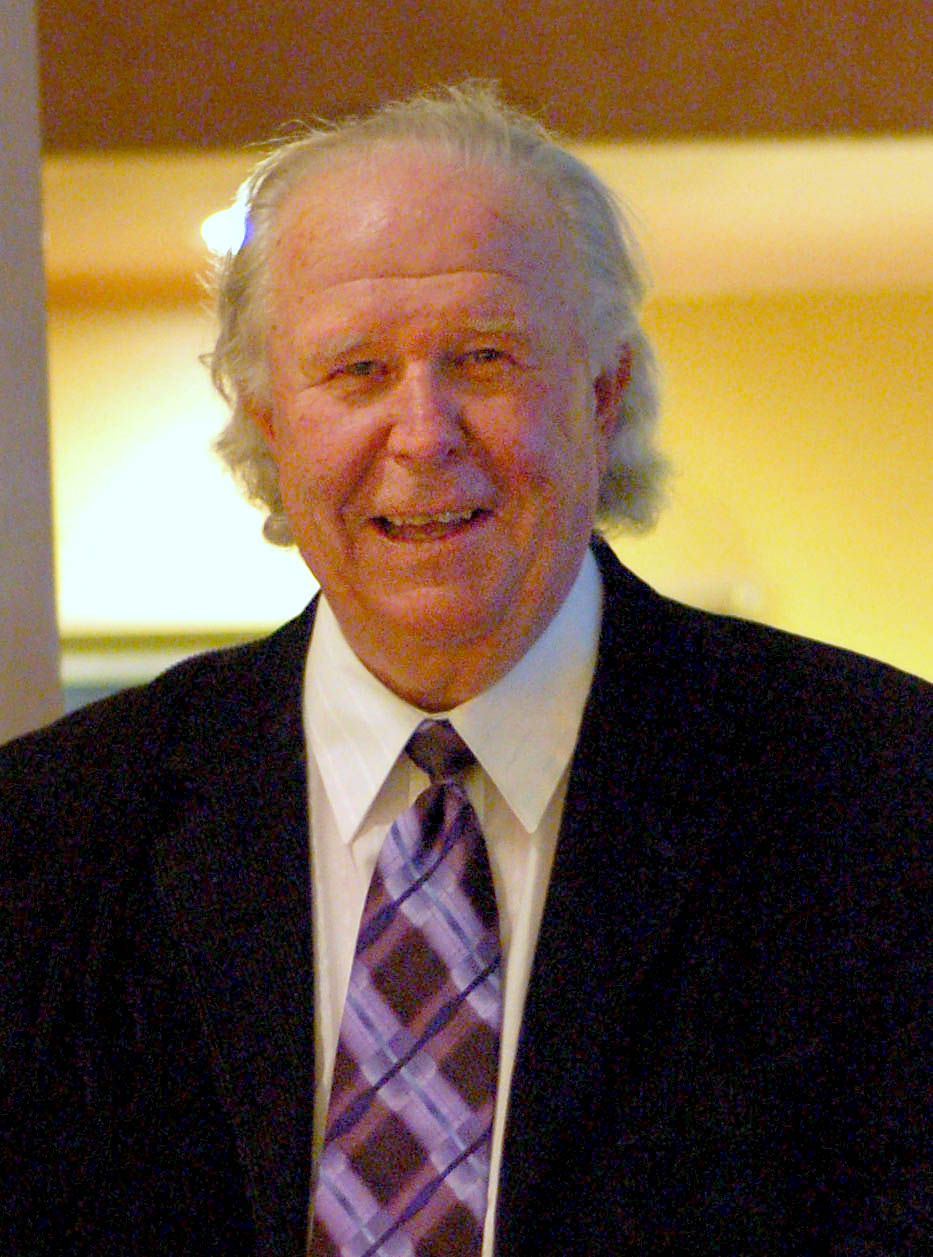
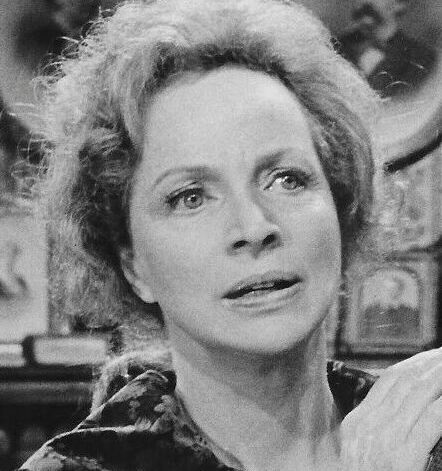
The entire cast (Peter Finch, William Holden, Faye Dunaway, Ned Beatty and Beatrice Straight) garnered widespread acclaim, earning them all Oscar nominations: the first two for Best Actor, and the last three for Best Actress, Best Supporting Actor and Best Supporting Actress, respectively, with Finch, Dunaway and Straight winning.

Vincent Canby of The New York Times called Network "outrageous ... brilliantly, cruelly funny, a topical American comedy that confirms Paddy Chayefsky's position as a major new American satirist" and a film whose "wickedly distorted views of the way television looks, sounds, and, indeed, is, are the satirist's cardiogram of the hidden heart, not just of television but also of the society that supports it and is, in turn, supported." Gene Siskel of the Chicago Tribune gave Network four stars out of four, calling it "a very funny movie that takes an easy target and giddily beats it to death." In a review written after Network received its Academy Awards, Roger Ebert called it a "supremely well-acted, intelligent film that tries for too much, that attacks not only television but also most of the other ills of the 1970s," though "what it does accomplish is done so well, is seen so sharply, is presented so unforgivingly, that Network will outlive a lot of tidier movies."

Not all reviews were positive: Pauline Kael in The New Yorker criticized the film's abundance of long, preachy speeches; Chayefsky's self-righteous contempt for not only television itself but also television viewers; and the fact that almost everyone in the movie, particularly Robert Duvall, has a shouting rant: "The cast of this messianic farce takes turns yelling at us soulless masses" and mentions the film is like a "Village crazy bellowing at you."

Gary Arnold of The Washington Post declared that "the movie is too sternly, monotonously preachy for either persuasion or casual amusement." Michael Billington wrote, "Too much of this film has the hectoring stridency of tabloid headlines", while Chris Petit in Time Out described it as "slick, 'adult', self-congratulatory, and almost entirely hollow", adding that "most of the interest comes in watching such a lavishly mounted vehicle leaving the rails so spectacularly."

Jack Shaheen, an American writer and lecturer who specialized in addressing racial and ethnic stereotypes, was critical of the film in his book, Reel Bad Arabs. He put it on his worst list, noting that Arabs were portrayed as "medieval fanatics," and criticized Chayefsky's "prejudicial Arab colloquies." He also asked whether Chayefsky would label Israelis as "medieval fanatics" and wondered why the producer, Howard Gottfried, and director, Sidney Lumet, sanctioned Chayefsky's "anti-Arab diatribe," as he described it, in the film. He additionally described the film's focus on Arabs not only to be "racist," but also nonfactual, and noted that Chayefsky condemned Vanessa Redgrave after she described demonstrators, protesting her pro-Palestinian views, as "a small bunch of Zionist hoodlums" at the 1978 Academy Awards ceremony.

On Rotten Tomatoes the film has an approval rating of 91% based on 85 reviews. The site's critics consensus states, "Driven by populist fury and elevated by strong direction, powerful acting, and an intelligent script, Network's searing satire of ratings-driven news remains sadly relevant more than four decades later." On Metacritic it has a weighted average score of 83 out of 100, based on 16 critics, indicating "universal acclaim".

=== Television ===
CBS acquired the television rights for $5 million and showed it on US television on October 4, 1978, however, it was beaten in the ratings by the television film B. J. and the Bear shown on NBC Television. Network had a rating of 16.0 (26% share of the TV audience) compared to B.J. and the Bear's average rating of 26.3.

=== Legacy ===
In 2000, Roger Ebert added the film to his Great Movies list and said it was "like prophecy. When Chayefsky created Howard Beale, could he have imagined Jerry Springer, Howard Stern, and the World Wrestling Federation?"; he credits Lumet and Chayefsky for knowing "just when to pull out all the stops." Screenwriter Aaron Sorkin wrote in 2011 that "no predictor of the future—not even Orwell—has ever been as right as Chayefsky was when he wrote Network." The film ranks at number 100 in Empire magazine's list of the 500 Greatest Films of All Time.

== Accolades ==
At the 49th Academy Awards, Network won 3 of the 4 acting awards. As of 2024, it is the second of only 3 films which have accomplished this feat, preceded by A Streetcar Named Desire in 1951 and followed by Everything Everywhere All at Once in 2022.

Peter Finch died before the 1977 ceremony and was the only performer to win a posthumous acting Academy Award until fellow Australian Heath Ledger won Best Supporting Actor in 2008. The statuette itself was collected by Finch's widow, Eletha, after Paddy Chayefsky, who had been asked by the Oscarcast producers and director to accept on Finch's behalf, invited her onstage.

Beatrice Straight appeared in only five minutes, two seconds of screen time, making it the shortest performance to win an Oscar as of 2025 (breaking Gloria Grahame's nine minute, 32 seconds record for The Bad and the Beautiful in 1952). Additionally, Ned Beatty's performance of Arthur Jensen occupied only six minutes of screen time, also making it the shortest performance by an actor to be nominated for an Oscar as of 2025.

Award	Category	Nominee(s)	Result	Ref.
Academy Awards	Best Picture	Howard Gottfried	Nominated	
Academy Awards	Best Director	Sidney Lumet	Nominated	
Academy Awards	Best Actor	Peter Finch	Won (Note: Posthumous award.)	
Academy Awards	Best Actor	William Holden	Nominated	
Academy Awards	Best Actress	Faye Dunaway	Won	
Academy Awards	Best Supporting Actor	Ned Beatty	Nominated	
Academy Awards	Best Supporting Actress	Beatrice Straight	Won	
Academy Awards	Best Original Screenplay	Paddy Chayefsky	Won	
Academy Awards	Best Cinematography	Owen Roizman	Nominated	
Academy Awards	Best Film Editing	Alan Heim	Nominated	
American Cinema Editors Awards	Best Edited Feature Film	Alan Heim	Nominated	
British Academy Film Awards	Best Film	Sidney Lumet	Nominated	
British Academy Film Awards	Best Direction	Sidney Lumet	Nominated	
British Academy Film Awards	Best Actor in a Leading Role	Peter Finch	Won (Note: Posthumous award.)	
British Academy Film Awards	Best Actor in a Leading Role	William Holden	Nominated	
British Academy Film Awards	Best Actress in a Leading Role	Faye Dunaway	Nominated	
British Academy Film Awards	Best Actor in a Supporting Role	Robert Duvall	Nominated	
British Academy Film Awards	Best Screenplay	Paddy Chayefsky	Nominated	
British Academy Film Awards	Best Editing	Alan Heim	Nominated	
British Academy Film Awards	Best Sound	Jack Fitzstephens, Marc Laub, Sanford Rackow, James Sabat, and Dick Vorisek	Nominated	
David di Donatello Awards	Best Foreign Actress	Faye Dunaway	Won (Note: Tied with Annie Girardot for Run After Me Until I Catch You.)	
Directors Guild of America Awards	Outstanding Directorial Achievement in Motion Pictures	Sidney Lumet	Nominated	
Golden Globe Awards	Best Motion Picture – Drama		Nominated	
Golden Globe Awards	Best Actor in a Motion Picture – Drama	Peter Finch	Won	
Golden Globe Awards	Best Actress in a Motion Picture – Drama	Faye Dunaway	Won	
Golden Globe Awards	Best Director – Motion Picture	Sidney Lumet	Won	
Golden Globe Awards	Best Screenplay – Motion Picture	Paddy Chayefsky	Won	
Japan Academy Film Prize	Outstanding Foreign Language Film		Nominated	
Kansas City Film Critics Circle Awards	Best Actress	Faye Dunaway	Won	
Los Angeles Film Critics Association Awards	Best Film		Won (Note: Tied with Rocky.)	
Los Angeles Film Critics Association Awards	Best Director	Sidney Lumet	Won	
Los Angeles Film Critics Association Awards	Best Screenplay	Paddy Chayefsky	Won	
National Board of Review Awards	Top Ten Films		2nd Place	
National Film Preservation Board	National Film Registry		Inducted	
National Society of Film Critics Awards	Best Actor	William Holden	2nd Place	
National Society of Film Critics Awards	Best Actress	Faye Dunaway	2nd Place	
National Society of Film Critics Awards	Best Supporting Actor	Robert Duvall	3rd Place	
National Society of Film Critics Awards	Best Screenplay	Paddy Chayefsky	2nd Place	
New York Film Critics Circle Awards	Best Film		Runner-up	
New York Film Critics Circle Awards	Best Actress	Faye Dunaway	Runner-up	
New York Film Critics Circle Awards	Best Screenplay	Paddy Chayefsky	Won	
Online Film & Television Association Awards	Film Hall of Fame: Productions		Inducted	
Producers Guild of America Awards	PGA Hall of Fame – Motion Pictures		Won	
Saturn Awards	Best Science Fiction Film		Nominated	
Writers Guild of America Awards	Best Drama – Written Directly for the Screen	Paddy Chayefsky	Won	

=== American Film Institute ===
- AFI's 100 Years...100 Movies – #66
- AFI's 100 Years...100 Laughs – Nominated
- AFI's 100 Years...100 Heroes & Villains:
  - Diana Christensen – Nominated Villain
- AFI's 100 Years...100 Movie Quotes:
  - "I'm as mad as hell, and I'm not going to take this anymore!" – #19
- AFI's 100 Years...100 Movies (10th Anniversary Edition) – #64

== Home media ==
Network was released on VHS in 1980, LaserDisc in 1983, DVD in 1998, and Blu-ray in 2011. It was released on Ultra HD Blu-ray and a remastered Blu-ray by The Criterion Collection on February 24, 2026.

== Stage adaptation ==
A play adaptation by Lee Hall premiered in the Lyttleton Theatre at the National Theatre in London in November 2017. The play was directed by Ivo Van Hove featuring Bryan Cranston making his UK stage debut as Howard Beale, and Michelle Dockery as Diana. It opened on Broadway on December 6, 2018, with Cranston reprising his role as Beale, and with Tatiana Maslany as Diana and Tony Goldwyn as Max Schumacher.
