= The Seven-Per-Cent Solution (film) =

1976 film by Herbert Ross

- Film poster by Drew Struzan
- Directed by: Herbert Ross
- Screenplay by: Nicholas Meyer
- Based on: The Seven-Per-Cent Solution by Nicholas Meyer (novel); Arthur Conan Doyle (characters)
- Produced by: Stanley O'Toole; Herbert Ross; Arlene Sellers; Alex Winitsky
- Starring: Alan Arkin; Vanessa Redgrave; Robert Duvall; Nicol Williamson; Laurence Olivier; Joel Grey; Samantha Eggar; Charles Gray; Georgia Brown; Régine Zylberberg; Jeremy Kemp
- Cinematography: Oswald Morris
- Edited by: Chris Barnes
- Music by: John Addison
- Production companies: Alex Winitsky/Arlene Sellers Productions; Herbert Ross Productions
- Distributed by: Universal Pictures
- Release date: 24 October 1976
- Running time: 113 minutes
- Countries: United Kingdom; United States
- Language: English
- Budget: $5 million

The Seven-Per-Cent Solution is a 1976 mystery film directed by Herbert Ross and written by Nicholas Meyer. Based on Meyer's 1974 novel of the same name, it stars Alan Arkin, Vanessa Redgrave, Robert Duvall, and Nicol Williamson.

In the film, Sherlock Holmes is apparently a delusional cocaine addict. He harasses the renowned mathematician Professor James Moriarty for no apparent reason. Dr. Watson and Mycroft Holmes arrange for Sherlock to receive treatment by Sigmund Freud, and Freud uncovers one of Sherlock's secrets.

== Plot ==
Dr John H. Watson becomes convinced that his friend Sherlock Holmes, the famous private detective, is delusional—particularly in his belief that the renowned mathematician Professor James Moriarty is a criminal mastermind—as a result of his addiction to cocaine. Moriarty visits Watson to complain about being harassed by Holmes and explains that he was the tutor of Sherlock and his brother Mycroft until "the tragedy" happened. When Watson inquires about the tragedy and tells Moriarty that Holmes never spoke about his youth, Moriarty is shocked and immediately leaves, unwilling to disclose any more details.

After reading an article about drug addiction by Sigmund Freud in The Lancet, Watson enlists the aid of Mycroft to trick Holmes into traveling to Vienna, where he is to be treated by Freud. After noticing that Holmes is staking out Moriarty's home, Mycroft visits Moriarty while Holmes is away and compels him to immediately travel to a certain address in Vienna by alluding to their previous connection.

Holmes, who had ensured that Moriarty would leave a trail of vanilla scent, summons Watson and bloodhound Toby to follow the scent. They are able to follow the trail by cab and train to Vienna to what turns out is Freud's office. A surprised Holmes, who had not known Freud beforehand, immediately deduces that he is a brilliant physician with radical theories and is convinced by Freud to admit that he is addicted to cocaine and needs help.

Holmes starts drug rehabilitation and Freud helps him with the symptoms by using hypnosis. After going cold turkey, Holmes starts to get better but Freud explains to Watson that Holmes's addiction cannot be fully cured until they are able to find out what led Holmes to resort to drugs in the first place.

When famous singer Lola Deveraux tries to commit suicide by jumping off a bridge, Freud, accompanied by Holmes and Watson, visits her in the hospital. Freud explains that he helped her overcome her drug addiction several months ago but that she seems to have relapsed. Holmes instead deduces that she had been kidnapped and drugged against her will, had fled her captors and then, realizing that she was now again addicted to drugs, attempted suicide. Both men admire her strength and Holmes seems particularly fascinated by her.

Following clues that Deveraux remembered about her kidnapping, the three men follow a suspect who leads them into a trap to be trampled by Lipizzans. They escape the trap but Holmes realizes that the goal was to give someone time to kidnap Deveraux again. The culprit is her lover, Baron von Leinsdorf. Deveraux realizes that she is being abducted when von Leinsdorf unwittingly mentions a detail about her first kidnapping. She leaves a trail of lilies which Holmes and Watson follow to a brothel where they encounter Freud, who got the idea to come here because he knew that Deveraux worked as a prostitute before. She is not there but they find a murdered nurse from the hospital and apprehend von Leinsdorf who they force to admit the truth: the baron had lost a large sum of money gambling with the Amin Pasha, the premier of the Ottoman Empire. The Pasha, who was enamored with Deveraux, had blackmailed von Leinsdorf into kidnapping her for his harem. After finding out that the Baron, the Pasha, and Deveraux are on a train to Istanbul, the three men commandeer another locomotive and follow the train. They catch up to it and Holmes duels and kills von Leinsdorf, while Freud forces the Pasha at gunpoint to set Deveraux free.

After they return, Holmes lets Freud hypnotize him one more time to discover the reason for his addiction. Under hypnosis Holmes recounts that Moriarty had an affair with his mother and his father killed her in front of him. Shocked at the revelation, Freud and Watson agree not to tell Holmes what they found out when he awakes. Later, Holmes leaves Watson and takes a steamer bound for Budapest, where he is astonished but delighted to encounter Deveraux, who seems to have anticipated his actions.

== Cast ==
- Alan Arkin as Dr. Sigmund Freud
- Vanessa Redgrave as Lola Devereaux
- Robert Duvall as Dr. Watson
- Nicol Williamson as Sherlock Holmes
- Laurence Olivier as Professor Moriarty
- Joel Grey as Lowenstein
- Samantha Eggar as Mary Watson
- Charles Gray as Mycroft Holmes
- Georgia Brown as Frau Freud
- Régine Zylberberg as Madame
- Jeremy Kemp as Baron Karl von Leinsdorf
- Anna Quayle as Freda
- Jill Townsend as Mrs. Holmes
- John Bird as Berger
- Alison Leggatt as Mrs. Hudson

== Production ==
The film was made at Pinewood Studios with location shooting in the UK and Austria (including the Austrian National Library); the tennis match/duel between Freud and von Leinsdorf was filmed on one of the historic real tennis courts at the Queen's Club in West Kensington, London. The production designer was Ken Adam.

Bernard Herrmann had been hired to write the score but died from a heart attack soon after. He was replaced by John Addison, who had composed the music for Alfred Hitchcock's Torn Curtain (1966), after a score by Herrmann had been rejected. Stephen Sondheim wrote a song for the movie ("The Madame's Song") that was later recorded as "I Never Do Anything Twice" on the Side By Side By Sondheim cast recording.

Meyer appeared in an 18-minute interview for the Blu-ray release by Shout Factory. Meyer discussed the genesis of the idea (his father was a psychiatrist and Meyer was a fan of Holmes' creator Arthur Conan Doyle) and how he took the opportunity to write the novel when the Writers Guild of America went on strike.

Meyer revealed that he had often fought with Ross because Ross was too faithful to Meyer's novel. He believed that the script would not be cinematic enough if it was too faithful with the source.

He discussed the casting including his push for Alan Arkin as Freud. He shared a story about how he and Ross decided to cast Duvall "in revolt" against Nigel Bruce's portrayal of Watson as a "Colonel Blimp"-type character. Meyer and Ross wanted to try to capture Watson's intelligence that had so far not been portrayed on-screen in Holmes movie adaptations.

== Reception ==
The Seven-Per-Cent Solution was well received by American critics. On the review aggregator website Rotten Tomatoes, 78% of 18 critics' reviews are positive, with an average rating of 6.5/10.

Vincent Canby of The New York Times called the film "nothing less than the most exhilarating entertainment of the film year to date." Gene Siskel of the Chicago Tribune gave the film four stars out of four and called it "the classiest motion picture of the holiday season" and "a rare combination of money and brains." He placed it ninth on his year-end list of the best films of 1976. Arthur D. Murphy of Variety called it "an outstanding film. Producer-director Herbert Ross and writer Nicholas Meyer, adapting his novel, have fashioned a most stylish, elegant, and classy period crime drama." Charles Champlin of the Los Angeles Times wrote, "It is a particularly handsome period piece, beautifully staged and acted and most genuinely charming." Gary Arnold of The Washington Post called the film "an amusing, elegant, and unusually appealing adventure movie, a swashbuckler with literate, intellectual heroes."

British reviewers were more critical with The Times calling it "a turgid concoction which draws no life from the Holmes/Freud confrontation and seems particularly ill-plotted." The Daily Telegraph said "The tale drags on for reel after reel before we cotton on to the fact that it is meant to be funny." The Sunday Times said "the basic conflicts in Conan Doyle's original dissipate into whimsy, cuteness and slow, period-laden self-indulgence."

Mike Hale of The New York Times, after mentioning Robert Downey Jr.'s version of Sherlock Holmes, Benedict Cumberbatch in Sherlock and Jonny Lee Miller in Elementary, opined that Nicol Williamson's Holmes was "the father of all those modern Holmeses" claiming the film "established the template for all the twitchy, paranoid, vulnerable, strung-out Holmeses to come."

== Awards and nominations ==
Awards and nominations earned by (or for) The Seven-Per-Cent Solution
Award	Category	Nominee(s)	Result	Ref.
Academy Awards	Best Screenplay – Based on Material from Another Medium	Nicholas Meyer	Nominated	
Academy Awards	Best Costume Design	Alan Barrett	Nominated	
National Board of Review Awards	Top Ten Films		5th place	
National Society of Film Critics Awards	Best Supporting Actor	Robert Duvall	3rd place	
Saturn Awards	Best Science Fiction Film		Nominated	
Writers Guild of America Awards	Best Drama Adapted from Another Medium	Nicholas Meyer	Nominated	

== Home media ==
Shout! Factory released the film on Blu-ray on January 22, 2013, along with a DVD in the package.
