= Silver Streak (film) =

1976 film directed by Arthur Hiller

- Film poster, artwork by George Gross
- Directed by: Arthur Hiller
- Written by: Colin Higgins
- Produced by: Thomas L. Miller; Edward K. Milkis
- Starring: Gene Wilder; Jill Clayburgh; Richard Pryor; Ned Beatty; Clifton James; Patrick McGoohan
- Cinematography: David M. Walsh
- Edited by: David Bretherton
- Music by: Henry Mancini
- Production companies: Frank Yablans Presentations; Miller-Milkis Productions
- Distributed by: 20th Century Fox
- Release dates: December 7, 1976 (Premiere); December 8, 1976 (New York)
- Running time: 114 minutes
- Country: United States
- Language: English
- Budget: $5.5 million or $6.5 million
- Box office: $51.1 million

Silver Streak is a 1976 American thriller comedy film about a murder on a Los Angeles-to-Chicago train journey. It was directed by Arthur Hiller, written by Colin Higgins, and stars Gene Wilder, Jill Clayburgh, and Richard Pryor, with Patrick McGoohan, Ned Beatty, Clifton James, Ray Walston, Scatman Crothers, and Richard Kiel in supporting roles. The film score is by Henry Mancini. This film marked the first pairing of Wilder and Pryor, who were later paired in three other films.

The film is primarily set on a train called the Silver Streak. A passenger accidentally finds out about the murder of an art historian and about efforts to discredit the victim's book. A shady art dealer is profiting from forged works of Rembrandt and is willing to kill in order to maintain secrecy about his crimes.

The film was released on December 8, 1976, by 20th Century Fox, and it received positive reviews from critics as well as earning $51.1 million against a budget between $5.5 million and $6.5 million.

== Plot ==
Book editor George Caldwell rides the Silver Streak train from Los Angeles to Chicago to go to his sister's wedding. During his travel he meets salesman Bob Sweet. Bob hits on a woman named Hilly Burns, who rebuffs him and has dinner with George. She is a secretary for Rembrandt historian Professor Schreiner. George and Hilly go to her cabin. As they have sex, George is startled to see a dead body fall off the train.

Hilly is sure George was just confused by a reflection in the window. When he sees a photo of Schreiner, George recognizes the professor as the dead man he saw. He goes to Schreiner's compartment and interrupts it being tossed by mysterious men, one of whom throws him off the train.

George stumbles across a farm and arranges a ride to town. Surprised to find that the ride is in a biplane, he realizes he can catch up with the train, which he reboards. He finds Hilly at lunch with art dealer Roger Devereau. As he explains to her what happened, Devereau interrupts and confesses that the men in Schreiner's cabin were his employees. He apologizes for the brutish Reace who ejected George from the train and introduces an astonished George to Professor Schreiner.

Assuming that Hilly and Devereau are involved, George is dejected. When he leaves, Devereau slaps Hilly. As George is drowning his sorrow, Sweet reveals that he is an FBI agent who is trying to prove that Devereau is running a scam appraising forged Rembrandts as genuine. Schreiner has several letters written by Rembrandt that Sweet is sure could expose the conspiracy. George realizes the letters are in Hilly's copy of Schreiner's book.

Sweet has his evidence, but he is assassinated by Reace. He was aiming for George, who escapes to the train's roof. He kills Reace with a found speargun but is knocked off the train again. A local sheriff arrests him on suspicion of killing a federal agent. Knowing Hilly is in danger, a desperate George steals a police car and is shocked to find arrested car thief Grover T. Muldoon in the back seat.

Happy to be freed, Grover helps George get to Kansas City to meet the train and save Hilly. George's face is on a Wanted poster at the station. Grover convinces George to don blackface in order to slip by the police and get back on board the Silver Streak.

George and Hilly confront Devereau, who reveals that the Schreiner George met was an impostor. He explains how he will stage their deaths just as Grover arrives disguised as a steward and helps the couple escape. Grover and George jump off the train and are arrested. They are brought to FBI Chief Donaldson, who explains that the dragnet for George was to ensure his safety. The agency knew Devereau killed Sweet. Donaldson enlists George to help arrest Devereau, but lets Grover go where he wants.

On the train, Devereau burns the Rembrandt letters and plans to stop the train before Chicago and escape on a helicopter. When the FBI stop the train and debark the passengers, Devereau and his men hijack it. During a gunfight with the FBI, Grover, who says he returned to give George back his wallet, helps George get back on the train to rescue Hilly. Devereau's henchman Whiney is injured by gunfire and has difficulty climbing onto the train; Devereau kicks him off the train to the ground. Devereau sets the train to full speed before being hit by Donaldson from a helicopter after George distracts Devereau. He falls to the floor, and is then decapitated by an oncoming freight train.

With the Silver Streak out of control, George and a porter uncouple the passenger cars, activating their brakes, but the runaway engine crashes into Chicago's central station, causing massive destruction. George, Hilly, and Grover observe the wreckage before Grover drives off in a stolen car that was on display in the station. George and Hilly bid him farewell and walk away together, ready to start their new relationship.

== Cast ==
- Gene Wilder as George Caldwell
- Jill Clayburgh as Hildegarde "Hilly" Burns
- Richard Pryor as Grover T. Muldoon
- Patrick McGoohan as Roger Devereau
- Ned Beatty as FBI Agent Bob Stevens / Bob Sweet
- Clifton James as Sheriff Oliver Chauncey
- Gordon Hurst as Deputy "Moose"
- Ray Walston as Edgar Whiney
- Scatman Crothers as Porter Ralston
- Len Birman as FBI Agent Donaldson
- Lucille Benson as Rita Babtree
- Stefan Gierasch as Professor Arthur Schreiner / Johnson
- Valerie Curtin as Plain Jane
- Richard Kiel as Reace
- Fred Willard as Jerry Jarvis
- Ed McNamara as Benny
- Henry Beckman as Conventioneer
- Harvey Atkin as Conventioneer
- Robert Culp as FBI Agent (uncredited)
- J. A. Preston as The Waiter (uncredited)

== Production ==
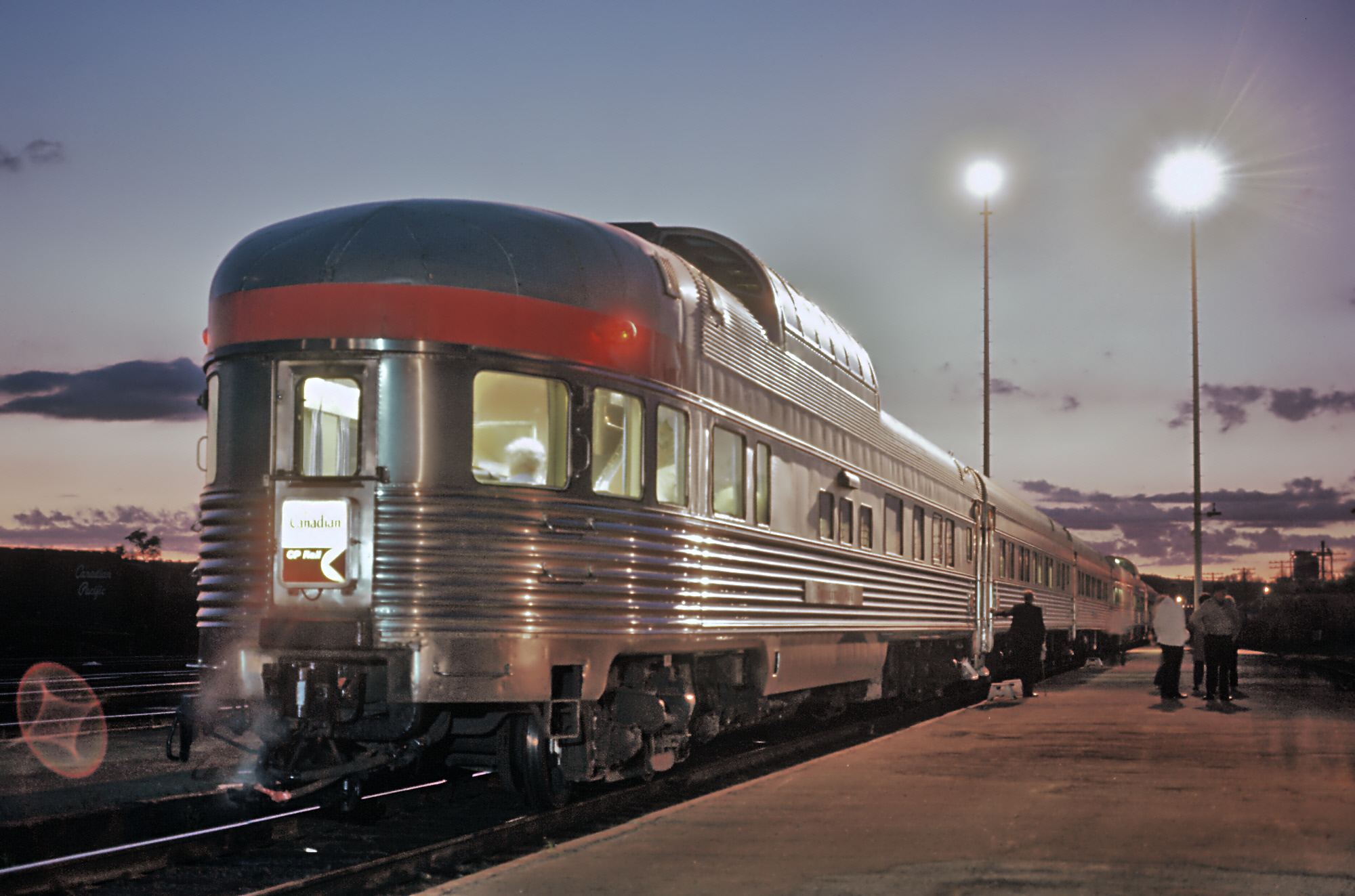
The train in the film was a disguised Canadian Pacific passenger train with an observation car. Much of the filming took place in Canada between Toronto and the Rocky Mountains.

The film was based on an original screenplay by Colin Higgins, who at the time was best known for writing Harold and Maude. He wrote Silver Streak "because I had always wanted to get on a train and meet some blonde. It never happened, so I wrote a script." Initially, the film was titled Super Chief after the Santa Fe train, but the company objected to the title.

Higgins wrote Silver Streak for the producers of The Devil's Daughter, a TV film he had written. Both they and Higgins wanted to get into television. The script was sent out to auction. At one point, the film was set on an Amtrak train and Paramount was interested but wanted Amtrak's approval. Alan Ladd Jr. and Frank Yablans at 20th Century Fox took advantage of Paramount's hesitation and bought the script for a then-record $400,000. Ladd described the screenplay, "It was like the old Laurel and Hardy comedies. The hero is Laurel, he falls off the train, stumbles about, makes a fool of himself, but still gets the pretty girl. Audiences have identified with that since Buster Keaton."

Because Amtrak objected to some elements of the script, the movie was filmed using CP Rail equipment. Canadian Pacific's The Canadian transcontinental train was disguised as the fictional AMRoad's Silver Streak. Most of the scenes were shot on the CP system in western Canada and Toronto Union Station. The railway yard shootout was filmed at CP's Alyth Yard, and the final crash scene was done on a studio lot.

Colin Higgins wanted George Segal for the hero, but the studio preferred Gene Wilder. Ladd reasoned that Wilder was "more identifiable for the younger audience. And he's so average, so ordinary, and he gets caught up in all these crazy adventures."

Colin Higgins claimed the producers worried about casting Richard Pryor because he had recently walked off The Bingo Long Traveling All-Stars & Motor Kings. They briefly considered casting an understudy for him; however, Pryor was very professional during the shoot. At that point, Pryor was frustrated with the supporting roles he was getting. The chance to work with a director like Arthur Hiller was his primary motivation for taking the part. Pryor was a particular fan of The Man in the Glass Booth.

After reading the script, Wilder felt the blackface interlude would only work with Richard Pryor and asked for him to be given the role. He and Pryor knew the blackface scene was offensive and tried to temper it. Higgins' script had a white man falling for Wilder's disguise. Pryor decided to switch the character to a Black man who sees right through it.

Pryor's improvisations prompted Wilder to respond in kind. It was the first time Wilder improvised onscreen. The pair were inspired by Buster Keaton to do their own stunts in the film.

== Release ==
The film had over 400 previews around the United States starting November 28, 1976 in New York City. It had its premiere at Tower East Theater in New York on Tuesday, December 7, 1976, and opened in New York City the following day. It opened in Los Angeles on Friday, December 10 before opening nationwide in an additional 350 theaters on December 22.

== Reception ==
Silver Streak grossed $1,821,000 in its opening wide weekend of December 24 to 26, 1976. It grossed $2,970,000 the following weekend. By January 23, 1977 it had grossed $17.6 million from 378 theatres. It eventually grossed over $51 million at the box office and was praised by critics. Ruth Batchelor of the Los Angeles Free Press described it as a "fabulous, funny, suspenseful, wonderful, marvelous, sexy, fantastic trip on a train, with the most lovable group of characters ever assembled." Roger Ebert gave the film 3/4 stars, raved that Colin Higgins' "screenplay is so carefully constructed that the exposition is a delight", called Arthur Hiller a "master of screwball comedy", and concluded that Richard Pryor, "who has been funny in a lot of unremarkable movies, is inspired in this one: He's on his way to becoming a major comic star."

Pauline Kael derided Silver Streak as "helplessly unslick" and "so apologetic that it starts with a mess of exposition, explaining why each of the principal characters didn't take a plane." Of Pryor, she noted how his arrival halfway through the film makes the viewer realize "how lethargic it was without him".

In the Chicago Tribune, Gene Siskel called the film "a needlessly convoluted mystery yarn, which calls everyone's identity into question except Wilder's." Siskel gave the film two stars and lamented, "I'm still not sure whether Clayburgh's character ... was in on the hustle from the beginning."

On the review aggregator website Rotten Tomatoes, 78% of 27 critics' reviews are positive, with an average rating of 6.4/10.

== Awards and honors ==
- Academy Award nomination: Best Sound (Donald O. Mitchell, Douglas O. Williams, Richard Tyler, and Harold M. Etherington)
- Nomination: Golden Globe Award for Best Actor – Motion Picture Musical or Comedy — Gene Wilder
- Writers Guild of America nomination: Best Comedy Written Directly for the Screen – Colin Higgins
- The film was chosen for the Royal Film Performance in 1977.
- In 2000, American Film Institute included the film in AFI's 100 Years...100 Laughs – #95.

== Score and soundtrack ==
Henry Mancini's theme for Silver Streak was included in the 1977 compilation Mancini's Angels. A full soundtrack album was released by Intrada Records in 2002. The stereo recordings were stored on 35 mm movie film and had seriously degraded. Because the film's sound was in mono, there were full quality mono mixes available. Intrada included both versions on the album.
