= 34th Golden Globe Awards =

Film award ceremony in 1977

- Date: January 29, 1977

Highlights
- Best Film: Drama: Rocky
- Best Film: Musical or Comedy: A Star Is Born
- Best Drama Series: Rich Man, Poor Man
- Best Musical or Comedy Series: Barney Miller
- Best Television film: Eleanor and Franklin

The 34th Golden Globe Awards, honoring the best in film and television for 1976, were held on January 29, 1977.

== Winners and nominees ==
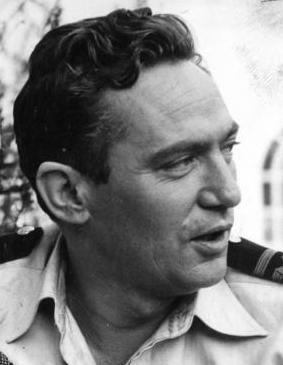
Peter Finch — Best Actor in a Motion Picture, Drama winner

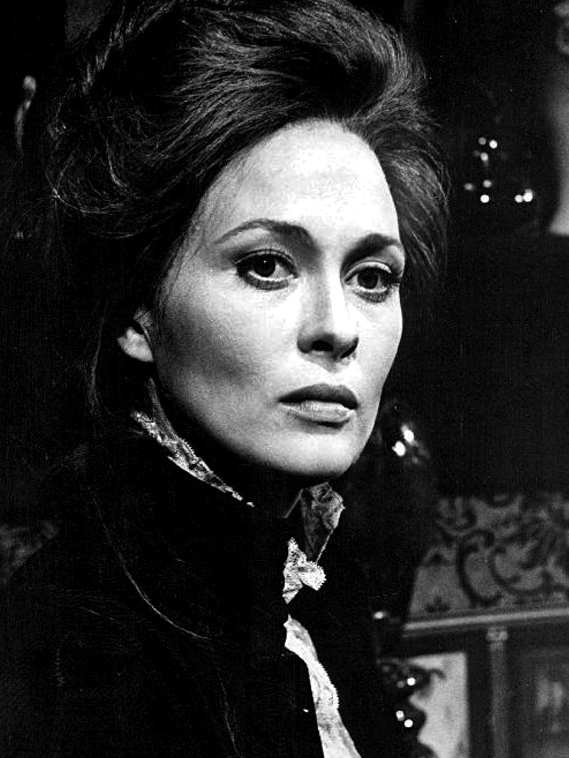
Faye Dunaway — Best Actress in a Motion Picture, Drama winner

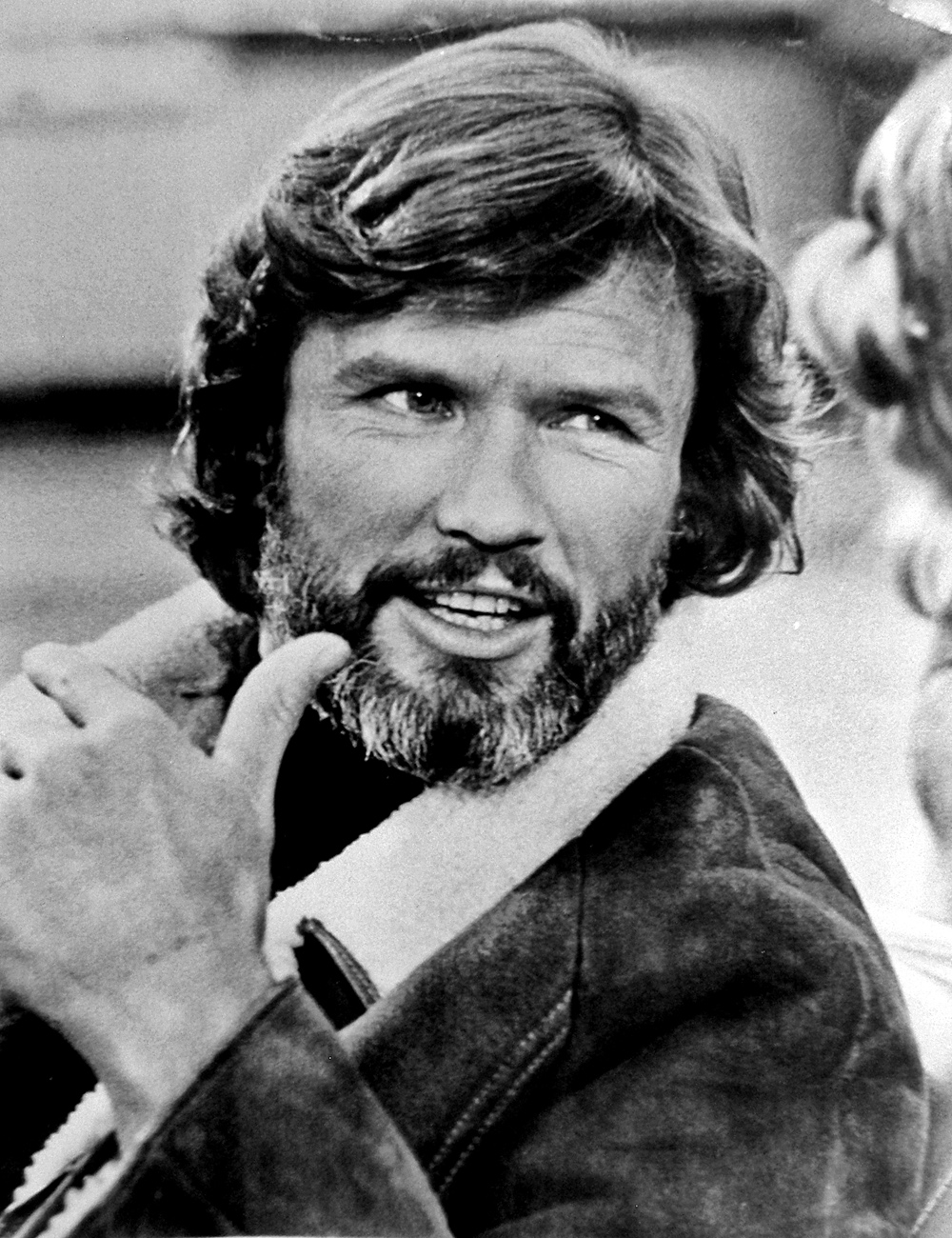
Kris Kristofferson — Best Actor in a Motion Picture – Musical or Comedy winner

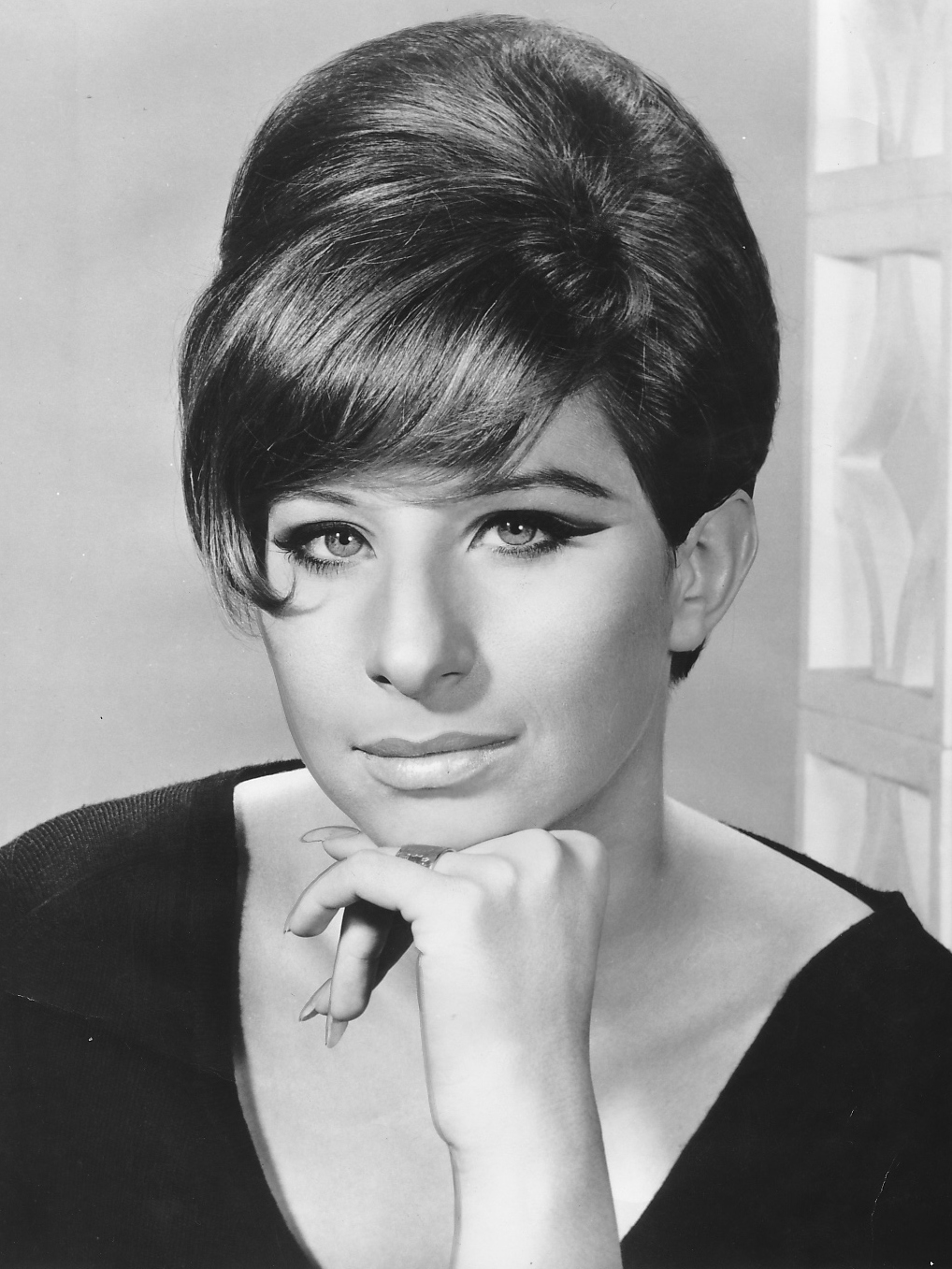
Barbra Streisand — Best Actress in a Motion Picture, Comedy or Musical winner

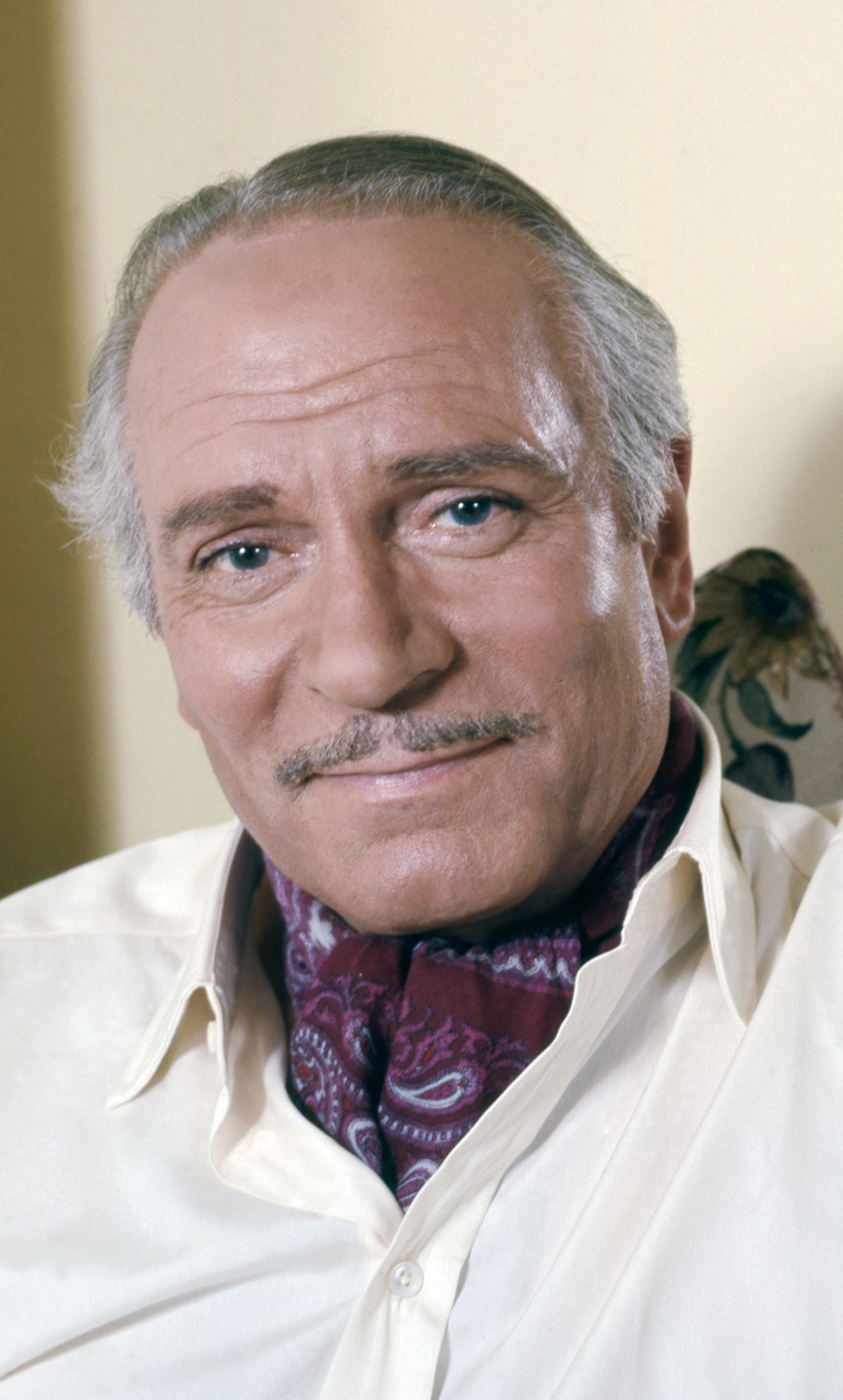
Laurence Olivier — Best Supporting Actor in a Motion Picture, winner

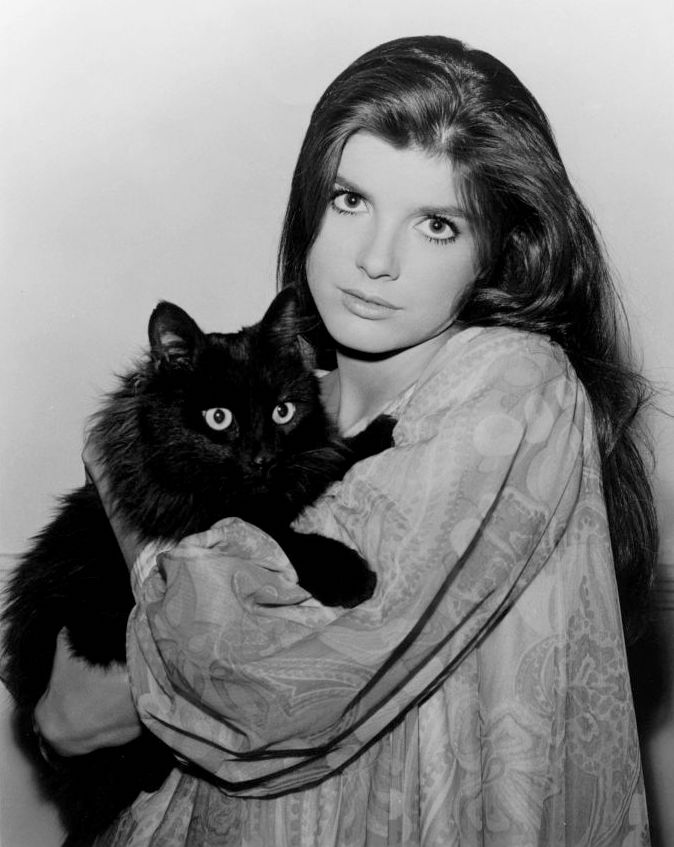
Katharine Ross — Best Supporting Actress in a Motion Picture, winner

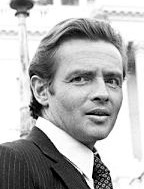
Richard Jordan — Best Actor in a Television Series, Drama winner

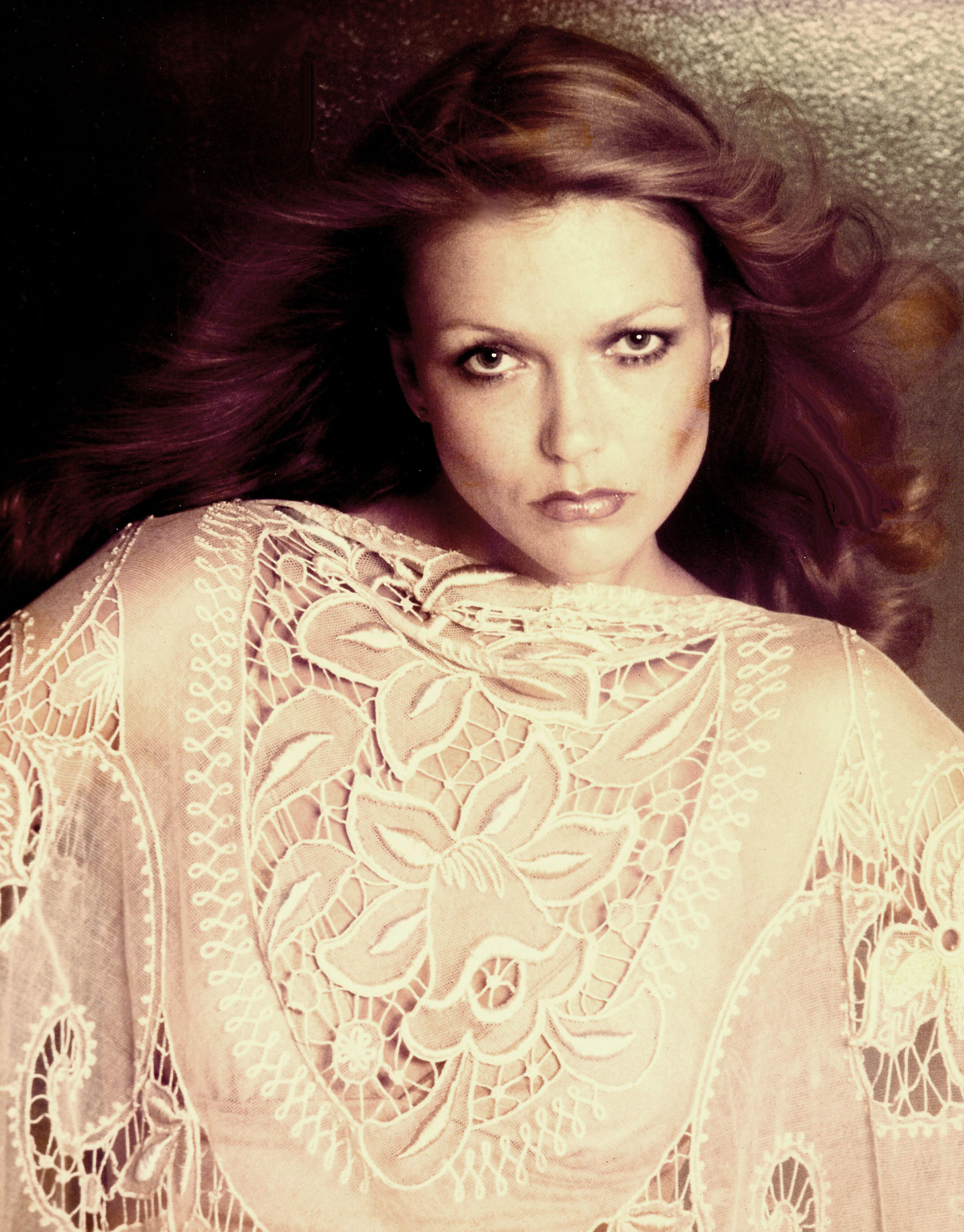
Susan Blakely — Best Actress in a Television Series, Drama winner

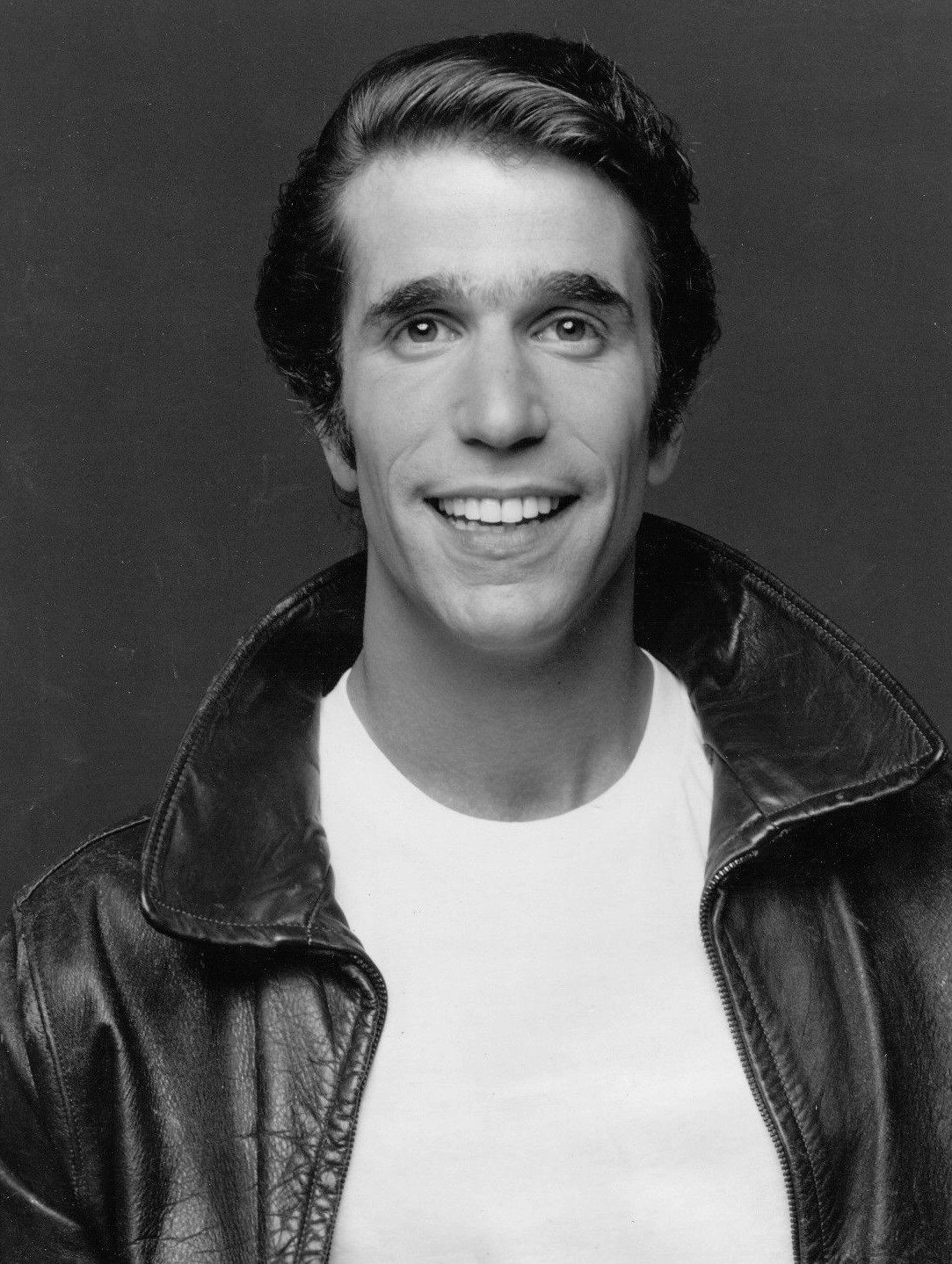
Henry Winkler — Best Actor in a Television Series, Comedy or Musical winner

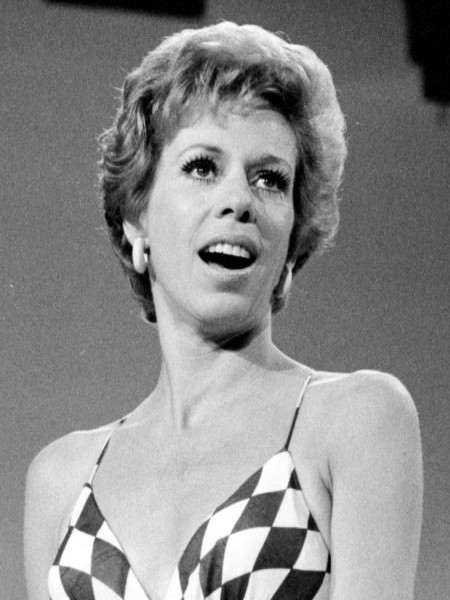
Carol Burnett — Best Actress in a Television Series, Comedy or Musical winner

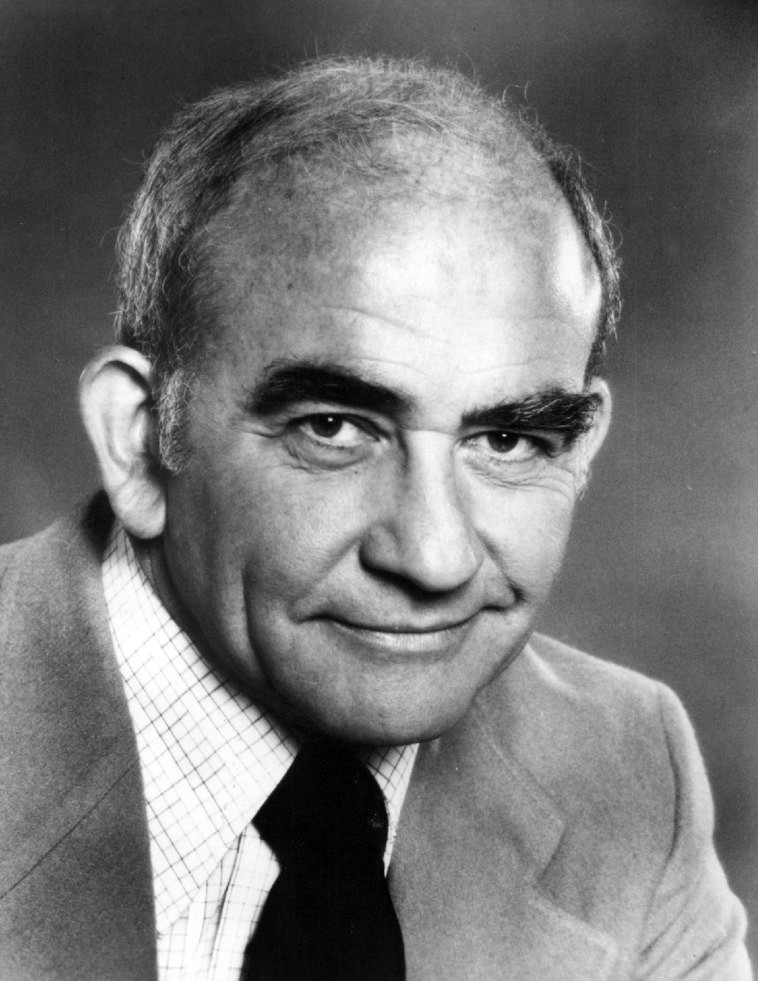
Ed Asner — Best Supporting Actor in a Series, Miniseries or Television Film winner

=== Film ===
Best Motion Picture
Drama	Comedy or Musical
Rocky; All the President's Men; Bound for Glory; Network; Voyage of the Damned	A Star Is Born; Bugsy Malone; The Pink Panther Strikes Again; The Ritz; Silent Movie
Best Performance in a Motion Picture – Drama
Actor	Actress
Peter Finch — Network as Howard Beale; David Carradine — Bound for Glory as Woody Guthrie; Robert De Niro — Taxi Driver as Travis Bickle; Dustin Hoffman — Marathon Man as "Babe" Levy; Sylvester Stallone — Rocky as Rocky Balboa	Faye Dunaway — Network as Diana Christensen; Glenda Jackson — The Incredible Sarah as Sarah Bernhardt; Sarah Miles — The Sailor Who Fell from Grace with the Sea as Anne Osbourne; Talia Shire — Rocky as Adrian Pennino; Liv Ullmann — Face to Face as Dr. Jenny Isaksson
Best Performance in a Motion Picture – Comedy or Musical
Actor	Actress
Kris Kristofferson — A Star Is Born as John Howard; Mel Brooks — Silent Movie as Mel Funn; Peter Sellers — The Pink Panther Strikes Again as Inspector Jacques Clouseau; Jack Weston — The Ritz as Gaetano Proclo; Gene Wilder — Silver Streak as George Caldwell	Barbra Streisand — A Star Is Born as Esther Hoffman; Jodie Foster — Freaky Friday as Annabelle Andrews; Barbara Harris — Family Plot as Blanche Tyler; Barbara Harris — Freaky Friday as Ellen Andrew; Goldie Hawn — The Duchess and the Dirtwater Fox as Amanda "Duchess" Quaid; Rita Moreno — The Ritz as Googie Gomez
Best Supporting Performance in a Motion Picture – Drama, Comedy or Musical
Supporting Actor	Supporting Actress
Laurence Olivier — Marathon Man as Christian Szell; Marty Feldman — Silent Movie as Marty Eggs; Ron Howard — The Shootist as Gillom Rogers; Jason Robards — All the President's Men as Ben Bradlee; Oskar Werner — Voyage of the Damned as Professor Egon Kreisler	Katharine Ross — Voyage of the Damned as Mira Hauser; Lee Grant — Voyage of the Damned as Lili Rosen; Marthe Keller — Marathon Man as Elsa Opel; Piper Laurie — Carrie as Margaret White; Bernadette Peters — Silent Movie as Vilma Kaplan; Shelley Winters — Next Stop, Greenwich Village as Fay Lapinsky
Other
Best Director	Best Screenplay
Sidney Lumet — Network; Hal Ashby — Bound for Glory; John G. Avildsen — Rocky; Alan J. Pakula — All the President's Men; John Schlesinger — Marathon Man	Network — Paddy Chayefsky; All the President's Men — William Goldman; Marathon Man — William Goldman; Rocky — Sylvester Stallone; Taxi Driver — Paul Schrader; Voyage of the Damned — David Butler and Steve Shagan
Best Original Score	Best Original Song
A Star Is Born — Kenny Ascher and Paul Williams; Bugsy Malone — Paul Williams; Rocky — Bill Conti; The Slipper and the Rose — Richard and Robert Sherman; Voyage of the Damned — Lalo Schifrin	"Evergreen" (Barbra Streisand, Paul Williams) – A Star Is Born; "Bugsy Malone" (Paul Williams) – Bugsy Malone; "Car Wash" (Norman Whitfield, Rose Royce) – Car Wash; "I'd Like to Be You for a Day" (Al Kasha, Joel Hirschhorn) – Freaky Friday; "Hello and Goodbye" (Alan and Marilyn Bergman, Elmer Bernstein) – From Noon till Three; "So Sad the Song" (Michael Masser, Gerry Goffin) – Pipe Dreams
Best Foreign Film	Best Documentary Film
Face to Face (Sweden); Cousin Cousine (France); Small Change (France); Seven Beauties (Italy); The Slipper and the Rose (United Kingdom)	Altars of the World; The Memory of Justice; People of the Wind; That's Entertainment, Part II; Wings of an Eagle
New Star of the Year – Actor	New Star of the Year – Actress
Arnold Schwarzenegger – Stay Hungry as Joe Santo; Lenny Baker – Next Stop, Greenwich Village as Larry Lapinsky; Truman Capote – Murder by Death as Lionel Twain; Jonathan Kahn – The Sailor Who Fell from Grace with the Sea as Jonathan Osborne; Harvey Spencer Stephens – The Omen as Damien Thorn	Jessica Lange – King Kong as Dwan; Melinda Dillon – Bound for Glory as Mary / Memphis Sue; Mariel Hemingway – Lipstick as Christine McCormick; Gladys Knight – Pipe Dreams as Maria Wilson; Andrea Marcovicci – The Front as Florence Barrett

The following films received multiple nominations:

Nominations	Title
6	Rocky
6	Voyage of the Damned
5	Marathon Man
5	Network
5	A Star is Born
4	All the President's Men
4	Bound for Glory
4	Silent Movie
3	Bugsy Malone
3	Freaky Friday
3	The Ritz
2	Face to Face
2	Next Stop, Greenwich Village
2	The Pink Panther Strikes Again
2	Pipe Dreams
2	The Sailor Who Fell from Grace with the Sea
2	The Slipper and the Rose
2	Taxi Driver

The following films received multiple wins:

Wins	Title
5	A Star is Born
4	Network

=== Television ===
Best Television Series
Drama	Musical or Comedy
Rich Man, Poor Man: Captains and the Kings; Charlie's Angels; Family; Little House on the Prairie	Barney Miller: The Carol Burnett Show; Donny & Marie; Happy Days; Laverne & Shirley; M*A*S*H
Best Performance in a Television Series Drama
Actor	Actress
Richard Jordan - Captains and the Kings as Joseph Armagh: Lee Majors - The Six Million Dollar Man as Steve Austin; Nick Nolte - Rich Man, Poor Man as Tom Jordache; Telly Savalas - Kojak as Lt. Theo Kojak; Peter Strauss - Rich Man, Poor Man as Rudy Jordache	Susan Blakely - Rich Man, Poor Man as Julie Prescott: Angie Dickinson - Police Woman as Sgt. Suzanne "Pepper" Anderson; Farrah Fawcett - Charlie's Angels as Jill Munroe; Kate Jackson - Charlie's Angels as Sabrina Duncan; Jean Marsh - Upstairs, Downstairs as Rose Buck; Sada Thompson - Family as Kate Lawrence; Lindsay Wagner - The Bionic Woman as Jaime Sommers
Best Performance in a Television Series – Musical or Comedy
Actor	Actress
Henry Winkler - Happy Days as Arthur "Fonzie" Fonzarelli: Alan Alda - M*A*S*H as Benjamin Franklin "Hawkeye" Pierce; Michael Constantine - Sirota's Court as Judge Matthew Sirota; Sammy Davis Jr. - Sammy and Company as Various Characters; Hal Linden - Barney Miller as Captain Barney Miller; Freddie Prinze - Chico and the Man as Chico Rodriguez; Tony Randall - The Tony Randall Show as Walter Franklin	Carol Burnett - The Carol Burnett Show as Various Characters: Bernadette Peters - All's Fair as Charlotte "Charley" Drake; Mary Tyler Moore - The Mary Tyler Moore Show as Mary Richards; Isabel Sanford - The Jeffersons as Louise "Weezy" Jefferson; Dinah Shore - Dinah! as Dinah
Best Supporting Performance in a Series, Miniseries or Television Film
Supporting Actor	Supporting Actress
Ed Asner - Rich Man, Poor Man as Axel Jordache: Tim Conway - The Carol Burnett Show as Various Characters; Charles Durning - Captains and the Kings as Ed Healey; Gavin MacLeod - The Mary Tyler Moore Show as Murray Slaughter; Rob Reiner - All in the Family as Michael Stivic	Josette Banzet - Rich Man, Poor Man as Miss Lenaut: Adrienne Barbeau - Maude as Carol Traynor; Darleen Carr - Once an Eagle as Tommy Caldwell; Ellen Corby - The Waltons as Esther Walton; Julie Kavner - Rhoda as Brenda Morgenstern; Vicki Lawrence - The Carol Burnett Show as Various Characters; Anne Meara - Rhoda as Sally Gallagher; Sally Struthers - All in the Family as Gloria Stivic
Best Miniseries or Television Film
Eleanor and Franklin: Amelia Earhart; Francis Gary Powers: The True Story of the U-2 Spy Incident; I Want to Keep My Baby!; The Lindbergh Kidnapping Case; Sybil

The following programs received multiple nominations:

Nominations	Title
6	Rich Man, Poor Man
4	The Carol Burnett Show
3	Captains and the Kings
3	Charlie's Angels
2	All in the Family
2	Barney Miller
2	Family
2	Happy Days
2	The Mary Tyler Moore Show
2	M*A*S*H
2	Rhoda

The following programs received multiple wins:

Wins	Title
4	Rich Man, Poor Man

=== Cecil B. DeMille Award ===
Walter Mirisch

== See also ==
- 49th Academy Awards
- 28th Primetime Emmy Awards
- 29th Primetime Emmy Awards
- 30th British Academy Film Awards
- 31st Tony Awards
- 1976 in film
- 1976 in television
