= Trident Media Group, LLC =

American literary agency

- Status: active
- Founded: 2000
- Founder: Robert Gottlieb, Dan Strone
- Country of origin: United States
- Headquarters location: New York City
- Key people: Robert Gottlieb (Chairman), Dan Strone (CEO), Shelly Schultz (President)
- Publication types: Books, e-Books, audiobooks, movie and TV adaptations
- Fiction genres: general fiction, nonfiction, mystery/crime, sci-fi/fantasy, lifestyle, non-fiction, graphic novels
- Official website: www.tridentmediagroup.com

Trident Media Group, LLC is an American literary agency based in New York City that represents authors across multi-platforms, including print publishing, eBooks, audiobooks, book translations, book-to-film/TV adaptation, stage adaptation and new media. Trident Media Group was co-founded in 2000 by Robert Gottlieb and Dan Strone. Since Trident Media Group's inception, it has expanded to include the work of American and foreign authors in the US and abroad.

Their roster includes Rita Moreno, Deepak Chopra, PEN/Hemingway Award winner Chris Albani, Hammett Prize winner Gil Adamson, Agatha Award Winner G. M. Malliet, Pulitzer Prize winner C. E. Morgan , Lambda Award winner Naeem Murr, and James Beard Foundation winner Ted Genoways.

== History ==
Trident Media group was co-founded in September, 2000 by Robert Gottlieb and Dan Strone, two literary agents and former senior executives of William Morris Agency from New York. According to Variety Magazine, in the autumn of 2002, the Trident Media Group literary agency merged with the Ellen Levine Literary Agency (established in 1980) and expanded its presence in the new market niche, including literary fiction, commercial fiction and nonfiction.

In April 2010, Trident Media Group started an experimental project with Vook to create vooks or digital books of mixed-media form that blends video, text, images and social streams in one context. The project discontinued since Vook formally ceased to exist in 2017. In 2011, TMG launched an Ebook division which allowed its authors to have optional access to digital media platforms such as Amazon, Barnes & Noble etc.

As of April, 2020, TMG had several departments including a Foreign Rights Department, Digital Media & Marketing (2011), Book to TV & Film Department and more.

== Notable authors ==
Trident Media Group authors include Kevin J. Anderson, Larry Bond, Dale Brown, Brian Herbert, Stephen J. Cannell, Tori Carrington, Isaac Asimov, Julian Lennon,Ann-Margret, Buzz Aldrin, Richard Myers, Peter Bart, Meredith Baxter, Igor Bergler (The Lost Bible's author), Amish Tripathi, Clea KoffRex Pickett, James Breakwell, Trinidad Escobar, Andrew Klavan, William F. Nolan, Melina Matsoukas, Megan Phelps-Roper, Chris Abani, Gil Adamson, André Alexis, Christopher Andersen, Elisabeth Tova Bailey, Stephen Colbert and many others.
