= Youthquake =

Youthquake

- Youthquake, a significant cultural, political, or social change arising from the actions or influence of young people; see Oxford Dictionaries' Word of the Year for 2017
- Youthquake (movement), a cultural movement
- Youthquake! a 1977 film about rock music and religion
- Youthquake (album), album from Dead or Alive
- Youthquake, a character in the comic book Justice Machine
