= A Pair of Hellions =

1924 film

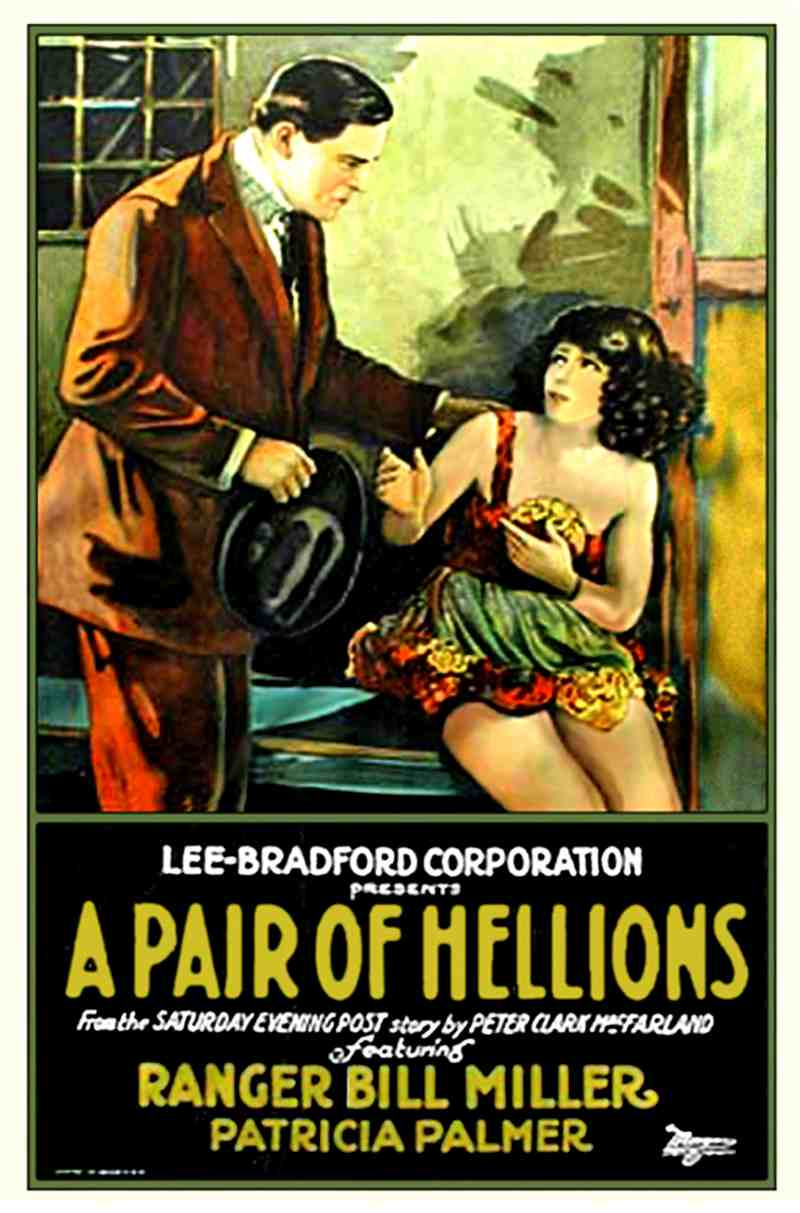
- Theatrical release poster
- Directed by: Walter Willis
- Written by: Peter Clark MacFarlane
- Produced by: Max O. Miller
- Starring: Ranger Bill Miller; Patricia Palmer
- Production company: Max O. Miller Productions
- Distributed by: Lee-Bradford Corporation
- Release date: March 1, 1924
- Running time: 6 reels
- Country: United States
- Language: Silent (English intertitles)

A Pair of Hellions is a 1924 American silent Western film directed by Walter Willis. It was produced by Max O. Miller and written by Peter Clark MacFarlane.

== Plot ==
A rustler (Ranger Bill Miller) flees to New York City, where he reforms himself and marries a dance hall girl (Patricia Palmer). When he returns to the west with his wife, he is almost lynched for his past crimes, but he is pardoned when he promises that he is reformed.

== Cast ==
- Ranger Bill Miller as Luther Jones
- Margaret Gibson as Mabel Turner, a Dance Hall Girl (credited as Patricia Palmer)
- Hal Stephens
- Ashley Cooper
- Flora Mae Moore as Irish Woman
