= Koff =

Koff may refer to:

- Koff (beer), a Finnish beer brewed by Sinebrychoff
- Koff (coffee substitute), a coffee substitute
- Clea Koff (British-born American forensic anthropologist) (born 1972)
- Joe Koff (1951-2024), American professional wrestling executive.
- Offutt Air Force Base (ICAO code KOFF)
- Koff (ship type), a historical type of sailing vessel in the North Sea
