= Max B. Miller =

Max Briant Miller (February 23, 1937 – January 17, 2011) was an American journalist, photographer and film producer. His film Youthquake! won the Golden Globe Award for Best Documentary Film at the 33rd Golden Globe Awards.

His father was producer and inventor Max O. Miller. He attended Los Angeles Valley College, UCLA, and Sherwood Oaks College. Miller wrote about cinema for American Cinematographer and other publications, and he owned and managed Fotos International.

A longtime Hollywood Foreign Press Association member, Miller served on their board from 1974 to 1982, and became chairman of the HFPA board in 1976 as well as a second term.

Miller committed suicide by gun the day after the 68th Golden Globe Awards. According to TV Guide, "Miller was depressed over his divorce and financial problems." Several obituaries noted that Miller's photography company was denied a place on the red carpet at that year's Golden Globes, where he had been a member for 44 years.
