= 11th Golden Globe Awards =

Film award ceremony in 1954

- Date: January 22, 1954

Highlights
- Best Picture: The Robe

The 11th Golden Globe Awards, were held in Santa Monica, California at the Club Del Mar honoring the best in film for 1953 films, on January 22, 1954.

== Winners ==
=== Best Motion Picture – Drama ===
The Robe directed by Henry Koster

=== Best Performance by an Actor in a Motion Picture – Drama ===
Spencer Tracy – The Actress

=== Best Performance by an Actress in a Motion Picture – Drama ===
Audrey Hepburn – Roman Holiday

=== Best Performance by an Actor in a Motion Picture – Comedy or Musical ===
David Niven – The Moon is Blue

=== Best Performance by an Actress in a Motion Picture – Comedy or Musical ===
Ethel Merman – Call Me Madam

=== Best Performance by an Actor in a Supporting Role in a Motion Picture ===
Frank Sinatra – From Here to Eternity

=== Best Performance by an Actress in a Supporting Role in a Motion Picture ===
Grace Kelly – Mogambo

=== Best Director – Motion Picture ===
Fred Zinnemann – From Here to Eternity

=== Best Screenplay – Motion Picture ===
Lili – Helen Deutsch

=== Best Documentary ===
A Queen Is Crowned

=== Henrietta Award (World Film Favorites) ===
Alan Ladd together with Robert Taylor

Marilyn Monroe

=== Special Achievement Award ===
Walt Disney for artistic merit in The Living Desert

=== Cecil B. DeMille Award ===
Darryl F. Zanuck

=== Promoting International Understanding ===
Little Boy Lost- directed by George Seton

=== New Star of the Year Actor ===
(Three way tie)

The Glory Brigade – Richard Egan

The Kid from Left Field – Richard Egan

So Big – Steve Forrest

The Man from the Alamo – Hugh O'Brian

=== New Star of the Year Actress ===
(Three way tie)

Forever Female – Pat Crowley

The Egyptian – Bella Darvi

It Came from Outer Space – Barbara Rush

Money From Home – Pat Crowley

Hell and High Water – Bella Darvi

=== Honor Award ===
Jack Cummings for producer at MGM for 30 years

Guy Madison for best western star
