= The Fighting Ranger =

The Fighting Ranger is the title of several films:

- The Fighting Ranger (1922 film), a 1922 American film starring and produced by Ranger Bill Miller
- The Fighting Ranger (serial), a 1925 film serial directed by Jay Marchant
- The Fighting Ranger (1926 film), a 1926 film directed by Paul Hurst
- The Fighting Ranger (1934 film), a 1934 film directed by George B. Seitz
- The Fighting Ranger (1948 film), a 1948 film directed by Lambert Hillyer
