= Chief Henry Red Eagle =

Algonquin actor, entertainer and wilderness guide

- Portrait of Chief Henry Red Eagle
- Born: Henry Perley; 1885
- Died: November 15, 1972 (aged 87); Greenville, Maine, U.S.

Henry Perley (1885 – November 15, 1972) was an Algonquin actor, entertainer, wilderness guide, and author. He is commonly known by his pseudonym, Chief Henry Red Eagle. Perley became the youngest licensed guide in the state of Maine at the age of 14. He attended Greenville High School, and during that time earned money by making snowshoes and working in lumber yards. He was not only the first full-blooded Indian to graduate from Greenville High School, but was also class president and graduated valedictorian of his class of 1902.

Perley's family roots can be traced back to the Maliseet Reservation in Tobique, New Brunswick, Canada. His parents, Gabriel and Philomen Tomah Perley, were known as Canadian Malecites, who migrated due to lack of game in the 1870s. Henry was the oldest of four siblings. He met his wife Wanna Eagle, a professional diver and swimmer, while working at Coney Island's Dreamland. Wanna returned to Greenville, Maine with Perley, where she established the Eagle Haven recovery swim camp on Sugar Island for polio victims. Perley died at the age of 87 in Greenville, Maine on November 15, 1972, and is buried in the Greenville Cemetery.

== Performance career ==
Upon graduation, he worked at the L.A. Harris Drugstore for several years before joining traveling shows throughout the United States and Great Britain in the 1910s. Perley made his first appearance in traveling shows with the Kickapoo Indian Medicine Show, where he performed in full tribal regalia. He then followed an Indian troupe to Great Britain where he performed in 1911 and 1912. After returning to the United States, he joined Buffalo Bill's Wild West Show and the Barnum and Bailey Circus. Perley often played the role of Indians stereotyped as savages during the early 1900s.

During his time working with Buffalo Bill's Wild West Show and Barnum and Bailey's Circus, Perley attracted much attention from Hollywood talent scouts looking to bring "authenticity" to their productions. He appeared in numerous silent films with actors and actresses such as Mary Pickford, the Gish Sisters, Rudolph Valentino, and Richard Dix.

The recognition Perley gained from appearing in the silent films landed him parts in six different Broadway plays, including Cole Porter's 1916 musical comedy See America First. He also appeared in Lynn Riggs and Cole Porter's Lo, The Poor Indian. Before retiring from performing, he appeared as part of an Indian show at the Chicago World's Fair.

== Writing career ==
Perley began his writing career under the pseudonym "Henry Red Eagle" in 1910, when he began writing short stories for pulp magazines such as Argosy, Top-Notch Stories, and All-Story Weekly. In the 1930s Perley moved back to the Moosehead Lake Region, where he worked as a wilderness guide and worked seasonally as a counselor at Camp Morgan, in Washington NH. He became well-established as a renowned storyteller who advocated for environmental conservation. He eventually retired from his position at the camp in 1966. During this time he wrote for more local publications such as In the Maine Woods and the Moosehead Gazette. Perley's stories encompassed themes of lumbering and adventures of wilderness guides. Focusing on the New England, he often highlighted the Native American presence in these areas to counteract the myth that they had disappeared from the northeast of the United States.

In 1997, twenty five years after Perley's death, his niece and granddaughter published a volume of some of his works entitled Aboriginally Yours.

== Partial filmography ==
- Tongues of Flame (1924)
