= Molly of the Follies =

1919 film directed by Edward Sloman

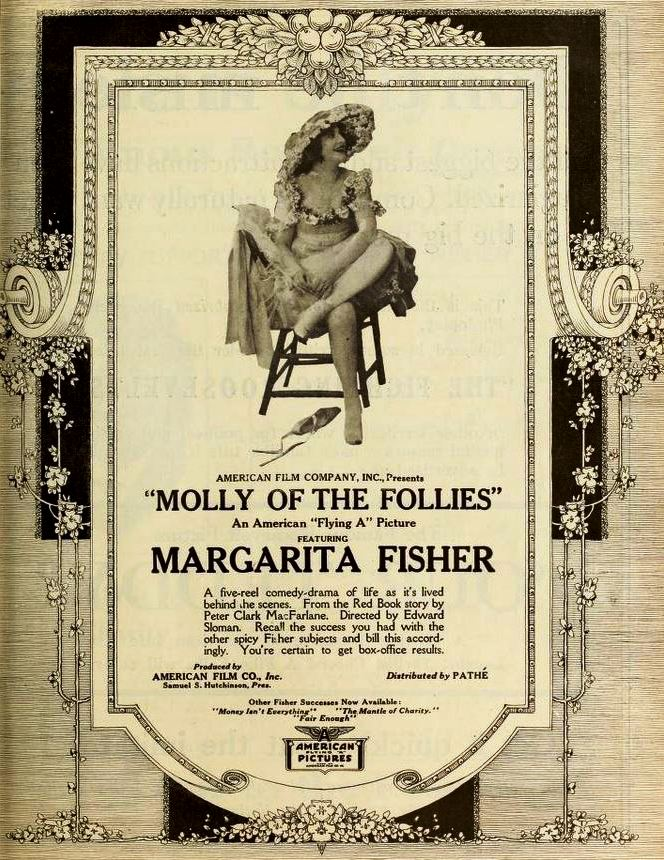
- Ad for the film with Margarita Fisher
- Directed by: Edward Sloman
- Based on: The Side-Show Girl by Peter Clark MacFarlane
- Production company: American Film Manufacturing Company
- Distributed by: Pathé Exchange
- Release date: February 16, 1919
- Country: United States

Molly of the Follies is a 1919 American comedy, silent black and white film directed by Edward Sloman. It is based on the story The Side-Show Girl by Peter Clark MacFarlane.

== Cast ==
- Margarita Fisher as Molly Malone
- Jack Mower as Joe Holmquist
- Lule Warrenton as Kate Malone
- Millard L. Webb as Milton Wallace
- J. Farrell MacDonald as Swannick
- Mary Lee Wise as Emily Ewing / Aunt Henrietta
