= Max O. Miller =

American film producer

Max Otto Miller was an American film producer and inventor of the Miller Stereoscopic Process, an early 3-D process to make and project pictures using a conventional camera lens with a concave spherical lens attached to increase field without increasing object distance. It included a special design for the aperture plate and projection of the picture through a double convexed spherical lens of shorter focal length. The method used 35 mm film printed single strip anaglyphic. It was used in films including the 1925 silent western movie The Ship of Souls. Miller also produced the 1924 film A Pair of Hellions. Director and photographer Max B. Miller was his son.
