= Blacks Britannica =

1978 American documentary film

Blacks Britannica was a 1978 American documentary film directed and produced by David Koff and Musindo Mwinyipembe. An analysis of the Black British experience of racism in Britain, it featured contributions by Colin Prescod, Darcus Howe, Jessica Huntley, Gus John, Claudia Jones, Courtney Hay, the Manchester community worker Ron Phillips, Tony Sealy and Steel Pulse.

== Making of the film ==
Koff and Mwinyipembe, who had spent much of her childhood in Britain, became interested in the phenomenon of British racism. In the wake of riots against over-policing of the 1976 and 1977 Notting Hill Carnival, they saw racial discrimination in Britain as similar in degree to that in the United States. They wanted to understand how it had developed so quickly: "from, say, 1958 to 1978 ... one had a 20 year span of time in which a pattern of institutional racism developed in Britain but at the same time a very clear response to that racism was also beginning to manifest itself.

They initially proposed a documentary about the British black community to the Boston public television station WGBH in September 1977. To make the documentary, Koff and Mwinyipembe worked closely with Colin Prescod and other black British intellectuals and activists. By the end of May 1978, according to Koff, the film was ready to show to WGBH. However, it faced immediate opposition from WGBH executives such as David Fanning and Peter McGhee:

There was a very immediate and hostile reaction. Everyone felt that it was "revolutionary, that the audience just wouldn't be able to cope with a film that came out so clearly, as they said, with a "call for revolution."

It was officially agreed that Koff and Mwinyipembe should continue preparing the film for national television release on July 13, 1978.

== Censorship ==
After submitting the final cut of the film in late June Koff and Mwinyipembe learned that WGBH had decided to cancel the July 13 broadcast, and 're-edit' the film for release. Accusing WGBH of censorship, Koff and Mwinyipembe organized a London press conference, and private screenings of the original film. Blacks Britannica also went on public exhibition at one London cinema, until WGBH secured an injunction against it.

WGBH released a statement by David Fanning objecting to the "arrangement of the material within the film, which, when viewed out of context by an American audience, would be confusing." They showcased their own re-edit to the press, blocking the original production team from attending viewings. The re-edit removed the beginning and end framing of the original film, removed provocative material such as and restructured the sequence of other material. The result was nearly five minutes shorter, with around 80 changes. The original film had presented an analysis "clearly from the black perspective", ascribing political responsibility for the situation to the British state in a post-colonial situation where capitalism was encountering limits. By contrast, the re-edited version presented what Mwinyipembe characterized as "the point of view of the state itself, laying the blame on blacks". All of the original production team disassociated themselves, and were not included in the credits for the re-edited version. Colin Prescod, outraged after managing to see the re-edit, demanded that the company remove all his material. WGBH ignored Prescod's request, and his legal attempt to block publication was unsuccessful.

Lawrence O’Keeffe, deputy director of the British Information Service (BIS) in New York, played a critical role in the suppression of Blacks Britannica. After reviewing the film, O’Keeffe described it as “dangerous” due to its depiction of Britain as a state steeped in systemic racism and plagued by violent social unrest. He specifically objected to how the film portrayed the British government and police as oppressive forces targeting Black communities. His report to the Foreign Office urged immediate action, resulting in the film’s ban from UK distribution. This intervention underscored how state-aligned institutions sought to control Britain’s international image by silencing media that exposed racial injustice and depicted Black political resistance as a legitimate response to state violence.

== Reception ==
The critic Peter Biskind saw Blacks Britannica as approaching "British racism from an uncompromising Marxist perspective, showing how it is used to create a permanent underclass and to set the working class at war with itself". WBGH's recut version provided "an object lesson in the anatomy of censorship." In December 1978 Blacks Britannica won the special prize of the International Organization of Journalists at the Leipzig Film Festival. Joel Dreyfuss, writing for Jump Cut in November 1979, called the film "a relentless and engrossing indictment of racism toward black immigrants to England, told from an obvious Marxist perspective."

In 2025 Blacks Britannia was covered by the British Film Institute with a detailed view of the film being publicly seen as "too incendiary" in 1978.

== Credits ==
- Producer & Director: David Koff
- Associate Producer: Musindo Mwinyipembe
- Editor: Tom Scott Robson
- Assistant Editor: Neil Gibson
- Photography: William Brayne, Mike Davis, Charles Stewart
- Music: Steel Pulse
- Sound Recording: Albert Bailey: Neil Kingsbury, Michael Lax
- Dubbing Mix: Tony Anscombe
- Research: Margaret Henry
