= The Black Man's Land Trilogy =

1973 Kenyan documentary

The Black Man's Land Trilogy is a series of documentary films on colonialism, nationalism and revolution in Africa, filmed in Kenya in 1970 and released in 1973, and still widely used in African studies programs internationally. The three titles are White Man's Country, Mau Mau, and Kenyatta.

John J. O'Connor of the New York Times called it "A solid historical document skewed, valuably, to a distinctive African point of view."

== Credits ==
- Produced and directed by Anthony Howarth and David R. Koff
- Written by David R. Koff
- Photographed by Bruce Parsons and Mohinder Dhillon
- Sound recorded by Ivan Sharrock
- Edited by Roger Buck
- Music by Peter Frampton (White Man's Country)
- Narration and voice-overs by Msindo Mwinyipembe with Keefe West as the voice of Kenyatta
- Produced by Anthony David Productions, Inc.
