= Golden Globe Cecil B. DeMille Award =

Honorary entertainment award

Cecil B. DeMille Award
- The Cecil B. DeMille Award statuette
- Awarded for: "outstanding contributions to the world of entertainment"
- Country: United States
- Presented by: Hollywood Foreign Press Association
- First award: 1952
- Currently held by: Helen Mirren (2026)
- Website: goldenglobes.com

The Cecil B. DeMille Award is an honorary Golden Globe Award bestowed by the Hollywood Foreign Press Association (HFPA) for "outstanding contributions to the world of entertainment". The HFPA board of directors selects the honorees from a variety of actors, directors, writers and producers who have made a significant mark in the film industry. It was first presented at the 9th Golden Globe Awards ceremony in February 1952 and is named in honor of its first recipient, director Cecil B. DeMille. The HFPA chose DeMille due to his prestige in the industry and his "internationally recognized and respected name". DeMille received the award the year his penultimate film, The Greatest Show on Earth, premiered. A year later in 1953, the award was presented to producer Walt Disney.

The award has been presented annually since 1952, with exceptions being 1976, 2008, 2022, and 2024. The second incident was due to the 2007–08 Writers Guild of America strike's cancellation of that year's ceremony. The award that year was meant to honor director Steven Spielberg, but due to the cancellation of the ceremony, the award was presented to him the following year. The third occurrence resulted from various media companies, actors, and other creatives boycotting the awards in protest over its lack of action to increase the membership diversity of the HFPA. In 2024, the award was shelved to make way for additional categories at that year's ceremony.

The youngest honoree was actress Judy Garland, at age 39 in 1962. Garland was also the first female honoree. The oldest honoree was producer Samuel Goldwyn, at age 93 in 1973. In 1982, Sidney Poitier became the first African-American recipient. In 2018, Oprah Winfrey became the first African-American woman to receive the honor. As of 2025, 71 honorees have received the Cecil B. DeMille Award: 18 women and 53 men. The award has notably been presented to two members of the same family: with Jane Fonda receiving the award in 2021, 41 years after it was presented to her father Henry Fonda.

== List of honorees ==
Year of ceremony, name of honoree, nationality, and his or her official HFPA description
Year	Image	Honorees	Nationality	Description	Ref.
1952	Cecil B. DeMille circa 1920	Cecil B. DeMille	USA	"A Hollywood pioneer, he directed and produced films such as The Ten Commandments (1923), The King of Kings (1927), The Greatest Show on Earth (1952) and The Ten Commandments (1956)."	
1953	Walt Disney in 1946	Walt Disney (Note: Stanley Kramer and Adolph Zukor received nominations for the award.)	USA	"In 1928, he created Steamboat Willie introducing Mickey Mouse, and from that point there was no stopping the king of family entertainment in the U.S."	
1954	Darryl F. Zanuck in 1964	Darryl F. Zanuck	USA	"Child actor at 8, World War I soldier at 15 (he lied about his age), bantamweight boxer, screenwriter, producer and co-founder of 20th Century Fox."	
1955	Jean Hersholt circa 1929	Jean Hersholt (Note: Stanley Kramer and Joan Crawford were nominated for the award.)	Denmark	"A Dane who came to Hollywood in 1914 when he was 28 and became a leading character actor and well-known humanitarian."	
1956	Jack Warner in 1955	Jack L. Warner	Canada	"Youngest of twelve children of Jewish immigrants from Poland who, with three brothers, established Warner Bros. which he ran with a firm hand until 1967."	
1957	Mervyn LeRoy in 1958	Mervyn LeRoy	USA	"Child actor and newsboy who started in the wardrobe department in 1919 and became a top director/producer."	
1958	An image of Buddy Adler	Buddy Adler	USA	"Began as a writer and always looked for the strong story, as evidenced in the films during his time as the head of production for 20th Century Fox."	
1959	Publicity photo of Maurice Chevalier	Maurice Chevalier	France	"The beloved Frenchman came to Hollywood in 1929 but was denied re-entry in 1935 due to his political views. By 1959, he was back, however."	
1960	Bing Crosby in 1951	Bing Crosby	USA	"Vocalist-drummer turned singer turned actor – the world loved that memorable voice and personality, and so did the HFPA."	
1961	Fred Astaire in You'll Never Get Rich (1941)	Fred Astaire	USA	"One of the immortals; began his career at age 7, danced with Ginger Rogers in ten films and then with Rita Hayworth, Eleanor Powell and Cyd Charisse."	
1962	Judy Garland in 1946	Judy Garland	USA	"Born in a trunk, working in films since 1935. When she received the award, A Star Is Born and her dramatic vignette in Judgment at Nuremberg were fresh in everyone's memory."	
1963	Bob Hope in 1978	Bob Hope	USA	"From vaudeville to movies where seven Road pictures with Bing Crosby and Dorothy Lamour as well as parodies and comedies made the world love him."	
1964		Joseph E. Levine	USA	"Born in direst poverty, a school drop-out at 14. As producer and founder of Embassy Pictures, he knew how to create excitement around his movies."	
1965	James Stewart in 1948	James Stewart	USA	"An intriguing leading man who came to represent the finest of American character traits."	
1966	John Wayne in 1965	John Wayne	USA	"He became the cinematic symbol of the strong man of few words who could solve every tricky situation and problem."	
1967	Charlton Heston in The President's Lady (1953)	Charlton Heston	USA	"Since his debut as Mark Antony in Julius Caesar in 1950, he remained the quintessential portrayer of heroes."	
1968	Kirk Douglas circa 1955	Kirk Douglas	USA	"An actor in films since 1946, a producer of films such as Spartacus, he was also the U.S. Goodwill Ambassador since 1963."	
1969	Gregory Peck in 1948	Gregory Peck	USA	"He combined his acting (To Kill a Mockingbird) with being active in charitable, civil rights and film industry causes."	
1970	Joan Crawford in 1936	Joan Crawford	USA	"From 1925 and throughout the '60s, she was the reigning queen of the Hollywood filmscape."	
1971	Frank Sinatra in 1959	Frank Sinatra	USA	"A singing/acting legend, loved and revered by countless fans all over the world."	
1972	Alfred Hitchcock in 1956	Alfred Hitchcock	UK	"Hailed as the unmatched master of the thriller genre, first during his so-called British period, then in American films."	
1973	Samuel Goldwyn in 1919	Samuel Goldwyn	Poland	"A true Hollywood pioneer also known for his Goldwynisms such as 'Anyone seeing a psychiatrist should have his head examined.'"	
1974	Bette Davis, c. 1930s	Bette Davis	USA	"She began her screen career in 1931 and remained active for nearly 60 years, playing willful, liberated, spitefully independent females."	
1975	–	Hal B. Wallis	USA	"From motion picture theater manager to assistant to head of publicity at Warner Bros. to becoming one of Hollywood's most successful producers."	
1976	Not awarded				
1977	–	Walter Mirisch	USA	"A Harvard graduate who worked his way up the administrative ladder, formed the Mirisch Company, Inc., with two brothers."	
1978	Red Skelton in 1960	Red Skelton	USA	"The son of a circus clown who died before he was born, he was the star of many MGM comedies, combining these with superstardom on television."	
1979	Lucille Ball in 1955	Lucille Ball	USA	"Hollywood's greatest female clown... and the world still proclaims I Love Lucy."	
1980	Henry Fonda in 1959	Henry Fonda	USA	"When the HFPA honored him, there were memorable roles to look back on, except one – his last... On Golden Pond hit the screens the following year."	
1981	Gene Kelly in 1943	Gene Kelly	USA	"He danced, choreographed, sang and acted his way into our hearts from 1942 (For Me and My Gal) and on (Singin' in the Rain, On the Town, An American in Paris)."	
1982	Sidney Poitier in 1968	Sidney Poitier	Bahamas; USA	"His charismatic screen persona brought him into definite leading man status (To Sir, with Love, In the Heat of the Night, Guess Who's Coming to Dinner). By the time of this award, he had also directed films for ten years."	
1983	Laurence Olivier in 1973	Laurence Olivier	UK	"Lord Olivier acted from age 9 and was especially known for making Shakespearean plays and characters come alive."	
1984	Paul Newman in 1963	Paul Newman	USA	"An enduring superstar (Hud, Cool Hand Luke, The Sting, Butch Cassidy and the Sundance Kid) with intelligence and humor saturating his roles, who had also demonstrated a distinct flair for directing."	
1985	Elizabeth Taylor in 1956	Elizabeth Taylor	UK; USA	"Having made her Hollywood screen debut at age 10, she became part of the world's cinematic royalty, from National Velvet in 1944 to Who's Afraid of Virginia Woolf? in 1966 – and beyond."	
1986	Barbara Stanwyck in 1939	Barbara Stanwyck	USA	"Cecil B. DeMille's favorite actress, equally at ease in comedy and drama—this was the year she left films to concentrate on television."	
1987	Anthony Quinn in 1988	Anthony Quinn	Mexico; USA	"Born in Mexico, he entered films in 1936 after a brief stage experience. In addition to his acting (Zorba the Greek, Lawrence of Arabia, La Strada), he was an accomplished painter and sculptor."	
1988	Clint Eastwood in 2010	Clint Eastwood	USA	"The 'Man with No Name' who ended up by being known by just about everyone on Earth. Versatile as an actor and also as a top director."	
1989	Doris Day in Midnight Lace (1960)	Doris Day	USA	"A singer whose voice sold millions of copies and opened the door to a movie career in comedy, then also in drama as in The Man Who Knew Too Much."	
1990	Audrey Hepburn in 1956	Audrey Hepburn	UK	"She came to represent grace, radiance and soulfulness—her appearance brought to mind delicate china but with the endurance of stainless steel."	
1991	Jack Lemmon in 1968	Jack Lemmon	USA	"This Harvard-educated, piano-playing actor with a remarkably broad range had by this time made some forty-four motion pictures."	
1992	Robert Mitchum in 1949	Robert Mitchum	USA	"A rugged leading man for more than four decades, whom Deborah Kerr said was a hundred times greater as an actor than he himself believed."	
1993	Lauren Bacall in 1945	Lauren Bacall	USA	"Being publicized as 'The Look' early on, she soon proved to be much more than that—having 'cinema personality to burn,' to quote James Agee."	
1994	Robert Redford in 2012	Robert Redford	USA	"A movie hero with boyish looks whose strong ideas and ideals led into producing, directing, and the establishment of the Sundance Institute."	
1995	Sophia Loren in 1962	Sophia Loren	Italy	"The slave girl in Quo Vadis in 1951 went on to impress in a succession of roles (who can forget Two Women?) in more than eighty films in Italy and Hollywood."	
1996	Sean Connery in 1983	Sean Connery	UK	"The handsome Scotsman began acting in films and on British TV in 1954. After being James Bond, he went on creating strong men in scores of films."	
1997	Dustin Hoffman in 2013	Dustin Hoffman	USA	"Erupting on the screen in The Graduate (1967), he has not stopped acting with body, soul and heart since."	
1998	Shirley MacLaine in 1960	Shirley MacLaine	USA	"A Renaissance woman who acts (comedy and drama), dances, sings, and writes about her spiritual wanderings, always ready to go out on a limb."	
1999	Jack Nicholson in 2002	Jack Nicholson	USA	"A living legend who doesn't think of himself as such, an enduring superstar simply because he is a terrific actor."	
2000	Barbra Streisand in 1966	Barbra Streisand	USA	"Singer, actress, film director, producer, writer, and composer whose popularity has endured and grown for nearly four decades."	
2001	Al Pacino in 2004	Al Pacino	USA	"One of the greatest actors in all of film history, Al Pacino established himself during one of film's greatest decades, the 70s, and has become an enduring and iconic figure in the world of American movies."	
2002	Harrison Ford in 2008	Harrison Ford	USA	"Ruggedly handsome, tightlipped leading man whose filmic output includes starring roles in four of the 10 highest-grossing films of all time: Star Wars (1977), The Empire Strikes Back (1980), Raiders of the Lost Ark (1981), and Return of the Jedi (1983)."	
2003	Gene Hackman in 1972	Gene Hackman	USA	"His tremendous ability with 'ordinary guy' roles has been rightly praised, sometimes at the expense of his equally impressive comic timing and the undercurrent of eccentricity that sometimes floats to the surface of his straightest roles."	
2004	Michael Douglas in 2013	Michael Douglas	USA	"A Hollywood icon who has not allowed his star-studded pedigree to impede him from becoming one of the industry's greatest."	
2005	Robin Williams in 2011	Robin Williams	USA	"Educated at Juilliard, his talent has carried him gracefully through roles hilarious, dramatic and bizarre."	
2006	Anthony Hopkins in 2001	Anthony Hopkins	UK	"His reserved character and personality belie his explosive energy on screen and his outstanding power of expression."	
2007	Warren Beatty in 2001	Warren Beatty	USA	"One of the most fascinating characters in the history of Hollywood, Warren Beatty received five Golden Globes, including one as Best Actor (Comedy or Musical) for Heaven Can Wait and another as Best Director for Reds."	
2008	Not awarded (Note: The 2008 awards ceremony was cancelled due to the 2007–08 Writers Guild of America strike; the HFPA deferred the award to the 2009 ceremony.)				
2009	Steven Spielberg in 2023	Steven Spielberg	USA	"Director, producer, studio founder (DreamWorks), Spielberg has received Golden Globes for Schindler's List, Saving Private Ryan and E.T. the Extra-Terrestrial."	
2010	Martin Scorsese in 2010	Martin Scorsese	USA	"Scorsese received two Golden Globe Awards for Best Director of a Motion Picture for The Departed and Gangs of New York. He received five additional Golden Globe nominations, including four as Best Director (Casino, The Age of Innocence, Goodfellas and Raging Bull) and one for Best Screenplay for Goodfellas (with Nicholas Pileggi)."	
2011	Robert De Niro in 2011	Robert De Niro	USA	"An actors' actor, from Mean Streets and The Godfather Part II to Silver Linings Playbook and Joy. Nominated for eight Golden Globes, winner as Best Actor/Drama for Raging Bull."	
2012	Morgan Freeman in 2018	Morgan Freeman	USA	"A stellar career spanning over forty years in film, stage and television. One of the most respected figures in the entertainment industry."	
2013	Jodie Foster in 2011	Jodie Foster	USA	"From child star to movie superstar and beyond: director, producer, industry leader, icon. Her acceptance speech at 70th Golden Globe Awards became the highlights of the evening."	
2014	Woody Allen in 2015	Woody Allen (Note: Woody Allen's award was accepted by Diane Keaton.)	USA	"A king of comedy who moved at ease into drama and psychological observation throughout a massive career spanning seven decades. Eight times a Golden Globe nominee, winner twice, both times as a screenwriter, for The Purple Rose of Cairo and Midnight in Paris."	
2015	George Clooney in 2016	George Clooney	USA	"Actor, writer, director, producer and humanitarian. Ten Golden Globe nominations, three wins: O Brother, Where Art Thou? (Actor – Motion Picture Comedy or Musical), Syriana (Supporting Actor) and The Descendants (Actor – Motion Picture Drama)."	
2016	Denzel Washington in 2000	Denzel Washington	USA	"Washington's achievements as a performer and a filmmaker have earned him seven Golden Globe Award nominations in two categories, resulting in two wins."	
2017	Meryl Streep in 2016	Meryl Streep	USA	"With eight Golden Globes and 29 nominations, Meryl Streep is an icon of the performing arts."	
2018	Oprah Winfrey in 2014	Oprah Winfrey	USA	"Acclaimed actress, producer, television star, entrepreneur, and philanthropist, Oprah Winfrey is a Golden Globe nominee for her work in The Color Purple."	
2019	Jeff Bridges in 2017	Jeff Bridges	USA	"Part of an illustrious Hollywood family, Jeff Bridges built a long, eclectic and celebrated career. A Golden Globe winner and four-time Golden Globe nominee, Bridges is also a musician and passionate philanthropist."	
2020	Tom Hanks in 2019	Tom Hanks	USA	"Actor, director, producer, writer, winner of eight Golden Globes."	
2021	Jane Fonda in 2015	Jane Fonda	USA	"Actor, author, and producer, winner of eight Golden Globes and 15 nominations."	
2022	Not awarded (Note: The 2022 awards ceremony was cancelled due a boycott stemming from various media companies, actors, and other creatives over its lack of action to increase the membership diversity of the HFPA. Furthermore, broadcaster NBC announced in May 2021 that the network would refuse to broadcast the ceremony in support of the boycott.)				
2023		Eddie Murphy	USA	"Actor, comedian, writer, producer, singer and one of the 100 Greatest Stand-ups of All Time."	
2024	Not awarded (Note: The 2024 award was shelved to make way for additional categories during the ceremony.)				
2025		Viola Davis	USA	"A revered artist, activist, philanthropist, best-selling author and an EGOT."	
2026		Helen Mirren	UK	"A force of nature and her career is nothing short of extraordinary. Her transcendent performances and commitment to her craft continue to inspire generations of artists and audiences alike."	

== Statistics ==
Winners by nationality
Country	Winners
USA	60
UK	8
Bahamas	1
Canada	1
Denmark	1
France	1
Italy	1
Mexico	1
Poland	1
