= David Koff =

Film director/writer and social activist (1939–2014)

- Born: David Richard Koff; September 24, 1939; Philadelphia, United States
- Died: March 6, 2014 (aged 74); Hastings-on-Hudson, New York, United States
- Other name: Richard Wakohozi
- Education: Stanford University; University of California, Berkeley
- Occupations: Documentary filmmaker, social activist, writer, researcher, editor
- Notable work: The Black Man's Land Trilogy; People of the Wind; Blacks Britannica
- Children: Clea Koff

David Richard Koff (September 24, 1939 – March 6, 2014) was an American maker of documentary films, social activist, writer, researcher, and editor. His interest in social and economic justice has shaped a career largely spent exploring human rights, colonialism, resistance movements, racism, labor unions, and the oppression and exploitation of undocumented workers in America. However, he veered from political concerns long enough to write and co-produce the film People of the Wind, for which, in 1976, he was nominated for an Academy Award for Best Feature Documentary.

== Early years: from the U.S. to Africa ==
Born in Philadelphia, Koff grew up in Van Nuys, California. After graduating from Stanford University with an honors degree in political science in 1961, Koff traveled to West Africa, teaching in Sierra Leone and participating in a voluntary work-camp project in Ghana. As a graduate student at University of California, Berkeley, in 1964, he returned to Africa, this time to East Africa, where he did academic research as well as writing and editing at the Nairobi-based East African Publishing House (EAPH). He was the uncredited ghostwriter of Field Marshal John Okello's memoir, Revolution in Zanzibar (EAPH, 1967), and, under the pseudonym Richard Wakohozi worked closely with Waruhiu Itote (General China) on his memoir, Mau Mau General (EAPH, 1967). Koff also traveled to Uganda, Tanzania, Zanzibar and Madagascar. Based in England from late 1969 to mid-1974, he returned to East Africa to film a series of documentary films for four months in 1970, then moved back to Nairobi in late 1974 to work as an editor for Transafrica Publishers.

== The Black Man's Land Trilogy ==
Koff's early films reflect this period. In addition to many short projects, he produced and directed (with partner Anthony Howarth) and wrote The Black Man's Land Trilogy, released in 1972–73, narrated by Tanzanian broadcaster Msindo Mwinyipembe and with music by Peter Frampton. The three films, still widely used in university African Studies programs, are White Man's Country, Mau Mau, and Kenyatta. The first explores the early stages of European settlement and colonial rule, and African resistance to it. The second focuses on the state of emergency declared by the British in Kenya in 1952, including the creation of the myth of a Mau Mau terrorist group to justify the suppression of the African nationalist movement. The third film is a critical biographical portrait of Kenya's first president, Jomo Kenyatta. Koff's use of newsreels, photographs and then-contemporaneous interviews with those who lived through this tumultuous period, has been praised for its authenticity and archival value. In particular, material from the Trilogy was included in Taking Root: The Vision of Wangari Maathai, a 2007 film about the Nobel Peace Prize-winning Kenyan environmental activist, made by Lisa Merton and Alan Dater|

== People of the Wind ==
In 1976, Koff joined again with Howarth to make a documentary of a different kind, People of the Wind. The film follows the Bakhtiari, nomadic pastoralists of Iran, as they make their way from winter to summer pastures. People of the Wind was nominated in 1976 for an Academy Award as Best Feature Documentary. It was narrated by actor James Mason.

== Blacks Britannica ==
In 1978, Koff returned to England for six months to make the film Blacks Britannica. Originally commissioned by the Boston public television station WGBH, the film later "raised hackles" at the station due to its perceived overtly political content. The ensuing legal battle over censorship, the right to make final cuts, and airing and distribution, was widely debated in the media at the time.

In Blacks Britannica, Koff uses the black lens to explore the ways that black Britons are racially excluded, terrorized, and politically and economically barred from society. Blacks Britannica plays on the preexisting title "Encyclopædia Britannica". The encyclopedia is seen as a treasured bound collection of information that covers a wide array of topics be that history, geography, context, social cues, culture, etcetera, and to have a Blacks Britannica means not only that they were excluded from the popular one, but it places black folks at the center of the story. Specifically, the film addresses the ever-so present tragedies of systemic racism and police brutality. Clips show videos of British police participating in segregation movements and arresting young Blacks for "suspected person of loitering with intent to commit an arrestable offense". Blacks Britannica itself is a videographic collection of stories, histories, cues, and context that debunks the information about Britain society that is prioritized, and emphasizes their right to call themselves black Brits.

== Occupied Palestine ==
Koff next turned his attention to the Middle East, where he made the even more controversial Occupied Palestine, perhaps the first film to look critically at the roots of conflict between Zionism and the Palestinian national movement for control of the land of historical Palestine. The film's American premiere at the 1981 San Francisco International Film Festival was interrupted by a bomb threat and the film subsequently engendered significant media debate. When it was broadcast on national public television in the United States in 1986, stations in New York and Washington DC, among other cities, refused to air the program. In 2013, the London Palestine Film Festival selected Occupied Palestine as its gala opening night film, calling it "trailblazing," a "masterwork of political cinema" and "a singular work of engaged filmmaking and a unique record of an overlooked chapter in the course of the conflict." Occupied Palestine was also an official selection of the 2013 Boston Palestine Film Festival.

== Labor movement activity and films ==
After returning to the U.S. in the 1980s, Koff worked as a strategic research analyst, filmmaker, and tactician with the Hotel Employees and Restaurant Employees International Union, HERE, a position that included speech writing, the creation of many short in-house strategic organizing videos, and developing film archives of various actions (such as the 2005 "Banquet in the Streets", demonstrations, and campaigns, the largest of which was the 2003 Immigrant Workers Freedom Ride. He served as founder and executive producer of the Immigrant Workers Freedom Ride Documentary Project.

Other projects included The Immigrant Workers Freedom Ride, Koff's Windows, a film with the families and colleagues of immigrant workers killed at the World Trade Center on 9/11, which premiered at the 2002 Latino International Film Festival and was an official selection of the 2013 Atlanta International Documentary Film Festival (DocuFest). Another recent film, The New Haven Raids / Les Redadas de New Haven, with music by Ry Cooder, has been described as "from the frontlines of a human and civil rights crisis that is worldwide", and was selected by Cineculture as part of the spring 2008 series.

== Later life ==
In 2006 Koff returned full-time to documentary filmmaking and, with independent producer and director Lyn Goldfarb, formed Organizing Video Productions OVP). OVP works primarily with unions to make short films that organizers and rank and file leaders can use as tools to build their movement.

Koff moved from California to Vermont in 2002, where he lived with the writer Crescent Dragonwagon. His novel Threat, a science fiction thriller, Koff self-published as e-book in 2012. It should have been part of a trilogy, The Barren Spheres Trilogy, followed by the books Promise and Loss.

Koff's daughter, Clea Koff, is a forensic anthropologist and writer, whose memoir of her work in Rwanda and the former Yugoslavia for the United Nations International Criminal Tribunal, The Bone Woman, has been published in many languages. Her debut mystery fiction novel, Freezing, was published in 2011.

Koff died by suicide on March 6, 2014, at Hastings-on-Hudson, New York, at the age of 74. He suffered from depression for several years.
