= Tongues of Flame =

1924 film

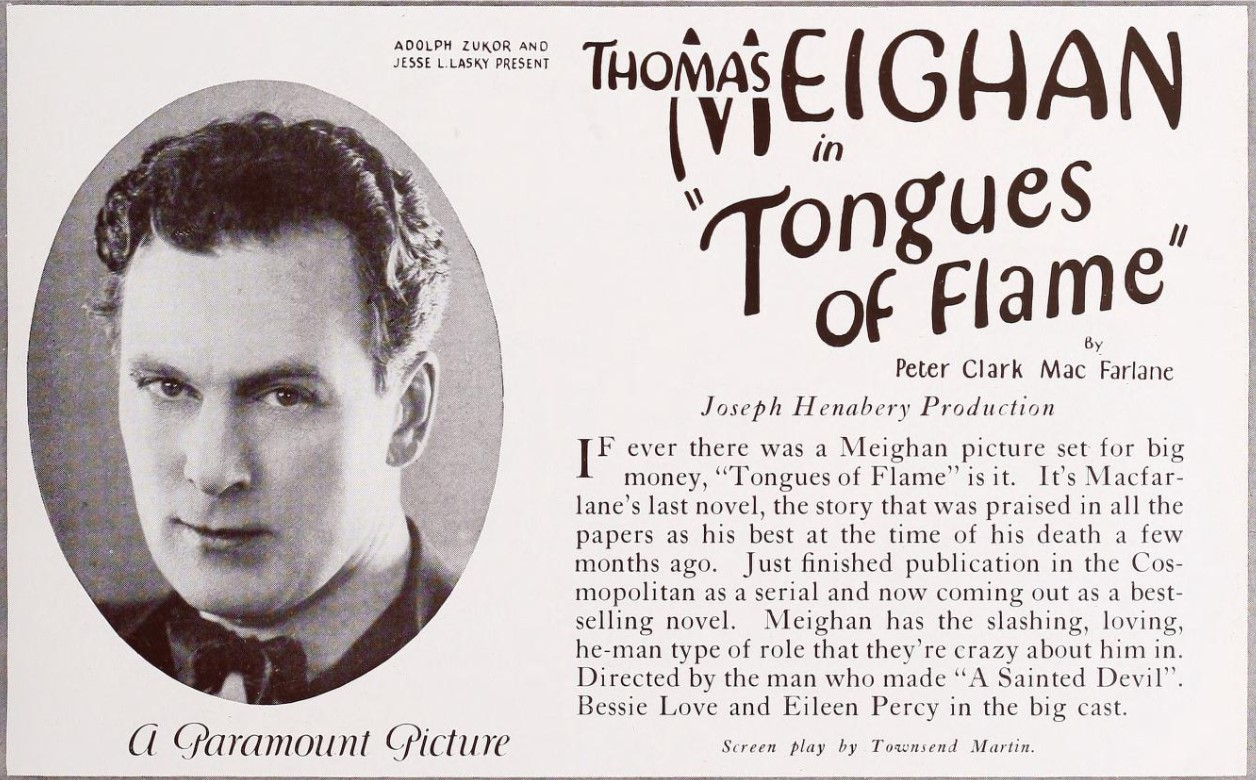
- Advertisement
- Directed by: Joseph Henabery
- Screenplay by: Townsend Martin
- Based on: Tongues of Flame by Peter Clark MacFarlane
- Produced by: Adolph Zukor; Jesse L. Lasky
- Starring: Thomas Meighan; Bessie Love
- Cinematography: Faxon M. Dean
- Production company: Famous Players–Lasky
- Distributed by: Paramount Pictures
- Release date: December 15, 1924 (U.S.)
- Running time: 70 minutes
- Country: United States
- Language: Silent (English intertitles)

Tongues of Flame is a 1924 American silent melodrama produced by Famous Players–Lasky and distributed through Paramount Pictures. It is based on a novel by Peter Clark MacFarlane and was directed by Joseph Henabery. The film starred Thomas Meighan and Bessie Love.

== Plot ==
The Native American Siwash people have been displaced from their land and live on a reservation. Wealthy Boland attempts to buy the reservation from the Siwash, who consult honest attorney Harrington for advice. Harrington looks into the contract and advises the Siwash to accept it. However, after the sale goes through, Boland drills for oil on the land, violating the contract. This angers Harrington, who exposes Boland's fraud. In retaliation, Boland has Harrington arrested on false charges.

A local court looks into the surveys associated with Boland's contracts, and returns all the Siwash native lands to them. Harrington is released from prison, and falls in love with the Siwash schoolteacher Lahleet.

== Cast ==
- Thomas Meighan as Henry Harrington
- Bessie Love as Lahleet
- Eileen Percy as Billie Boland
- Berton Churchill as Boland
- John Miltern as Scanlon
- Leslie Stowe as Hornblower
- Nick Thompson as Adam John
- Jerry Devine as Mickey
- Kate Mayhew as Mrs. Vickers
- Cyril Ring as Clayton
- Chief Henry Red Eagle as Indian sergeant

== Production ==
The picture was filmed at Great Neck and Manhasset Bay on Long Island, New York.

== Reception ==
The film received generally negative reviews, although Bessie Love's performance was praised.

== Preservation ==
With no prints of Tongues of Flame located in any film archives, it is a lost film.

== See also ==
- Whitewashing in film
