= Golden Globe Award for Best Documentary Film =

Golden Globe Award

Golden Globe for Best Documentary Film
- Awarded for: Best Documentary Motion Picture
- Location: United States
- Presented by: Hollywood Foreign Press Association
- Currently held by: Altars of the World (1976)
- Website: www.goldenglobes.com

The Golden Globe Award for Best Documentary Film was a Golden Globe Award that was introduced for the 11th Golden Globe Awards, followed by the 30th Golden Globe Awards before discontinuation after the 34th Golden Globe Awards.

== History ==
The award was first given to A Queen is Crowned (1953), which details the Coronation of Queen Elizabeth II. It was last given to Altars of the World (1976).

== Winners and nominees ==
1953

- A Queen is Crowned

1972

- Elvis on Tour
- Walls of Fire
- Marjoe
- Russia
- Sapporo Orinpikku (Sapporo Winter Olympics)

1973

- Visions of Eight
- Love
- The Movies That Made Us
- The Second Gun
- Wattstax

1974

- Animals Are Beautiful People
- Birds Do It, Bees Do It
- Hearts and Minds
- I Am a Dancer
- Janis

1975

- Youthquake!
- Brother Can You Spare a Dime?
- The Gentleman Tramp
- Mustang: The House That Joe Built
- The Other Half of the Sky: A China Memoir
- UFOs: Past, Present, and Future

1976

- Altars of the World
- People of the Wind
- The Memory of Justice
- Wings of an Eagle
- That's Entertainment, Part II

== See also ==
- Academy Award for Best Documentary Feature
