= The Lost Bible =

2015 book by Igor Bergler

- Author: Igor Bergler
- Language: Romanian
- Publisher: RAO
- Publication date: 1 October 2015
- Publication place: Romania
- Pages: 556
- ISBN: 9786066098939

The Lost Bible is a 2015 book by Igor Bergler. It is the most widely sold Romanian novel of the last 20 years. Romanian literary critic Mihai Iovănel named it "the best thriller published so far by a Romanian author" in 2016. It won the most important award at Romania's number one publishing event, the Gaudeamus Book Fair, being designated by 125,000 readers as "The most coveted and best-selling book of the fair" both in 2015 and 2016.

== Plot ==
Professor Baker is in the middle of a conspiracy of planetary proportions that runs for more than half a millennium. Helped by the interpol agent Christa Wolf and by the clues left by his grandfather before he died, Baker must discover the message hidden in the first printed bible, the Gutenberg Bible. The story is full of mystery, adventure and historic references that reveals a new face of Vlad the Impaler (Romanian:Vlad Țepeș, a.k.a. "Dracula").

== Reception ==
The Lost Bible sold more than 82.000 copies in its first year, becoming the best sold fiction book of a Romanian author in the last 20 years. Meanwhile, it surpassed 100,000 sold copies. The book has become the first book in Romanian history to exceeded 10,000 copies sold in preorder. 3,200 copies walked off the shelves in the first weekend of sales.

The Lost Bible was the signature book of the Gaudeamus Book Fair, Bucharest (2015), where 125,000 visitors voted it the most desired book at the fair and took home 1,600 copies in just four days. The novel is under contract with Trident Media group and featured on its hot list at the London Book Fair.

In 2015 and 2016, The Lost Bible was honored at the Gaudeamus Book Fair, designated by 125,000 readers as "The most coveted and best-selling book of the fair", alongside the Harry Potter series.

== Further stories ==
The Lost Bible is part of the Charles Baker Collection. Two more books in this series, Lincoln’s Best Kept Secret and Richard the Third’s Lost Hunch, are in preparation.

The Lost Bible’s English translator, Jean Harris, writes:

If Eco plays with the detective story, at the lowest level "The Lost Bible" is an action thriller with the accent on horror, occasionally Gothic. Essentially, though, it's a conspiracy novel composed of infinitely small puzzle pieces whose sense can't be guessed till the end.... On this pretext of a novel with great mass appeal, Bergler has based a complex construction that betrays a much greater ambition, evident in the novel as a whole.... For the wider audience, though, the book's most important quality is its overwhelmingly visual character. Although full of information, stuffed with references and games at many levels, "The Lost Bible" isn't a book to read but to see, just like a favorite movie. "The Lost Bible", Translator's Afterward.
