= A Queen Is Crowned =

1953 British documentary film by Michael Waldman

- Film poster
- Directed by: Michael Waldman
- Written by: Christopher Fry
- Produced by: Castleton Knight
- Narrated by: Laurence Olivier
- Music by: Guy Warrack
- Production company: The Rank Organisation
- Distributed by: General Film Distributors
- Release date: 2 June 1953
- Running time: 79 minutes
- Country: United Kingdom
- Language: English
- Box office: $602,702 (US)

A Queen Is Crowned is a 1953 British Technicolor documentary film written by Christopher Fry. The film documents the 1953 Coronation of Queen Elizabeth II, with a narration of events by Laurence Olivier. It was nominated for the Academy Award for Best Documentary Feature and was the first winner of the now-defunct Golden Globe Award for Best Documentary Film. The film was one of the most popular at the British box office in 1953.

== Cast ==
- Laurence Olivier as Narrator
- Queen Elizabeth II as Herself
- Philip, Duke of Edinburgh as Himself
- Queen Elizabeth the Queen Mother as Herself
- Prince Charles, Duke of Cornwall as Himself
- Jawaharlal Nehru as Himself

== Release ==
It was the first film ever shown on the Scottish islands of Eigg and Rùm, although played on the latter island without sound as the generator was not strong enough.

== See also ==
- Royal Journey
- Coronation of Queen Elizabeth II
