= Peter Clark MacFarlane =

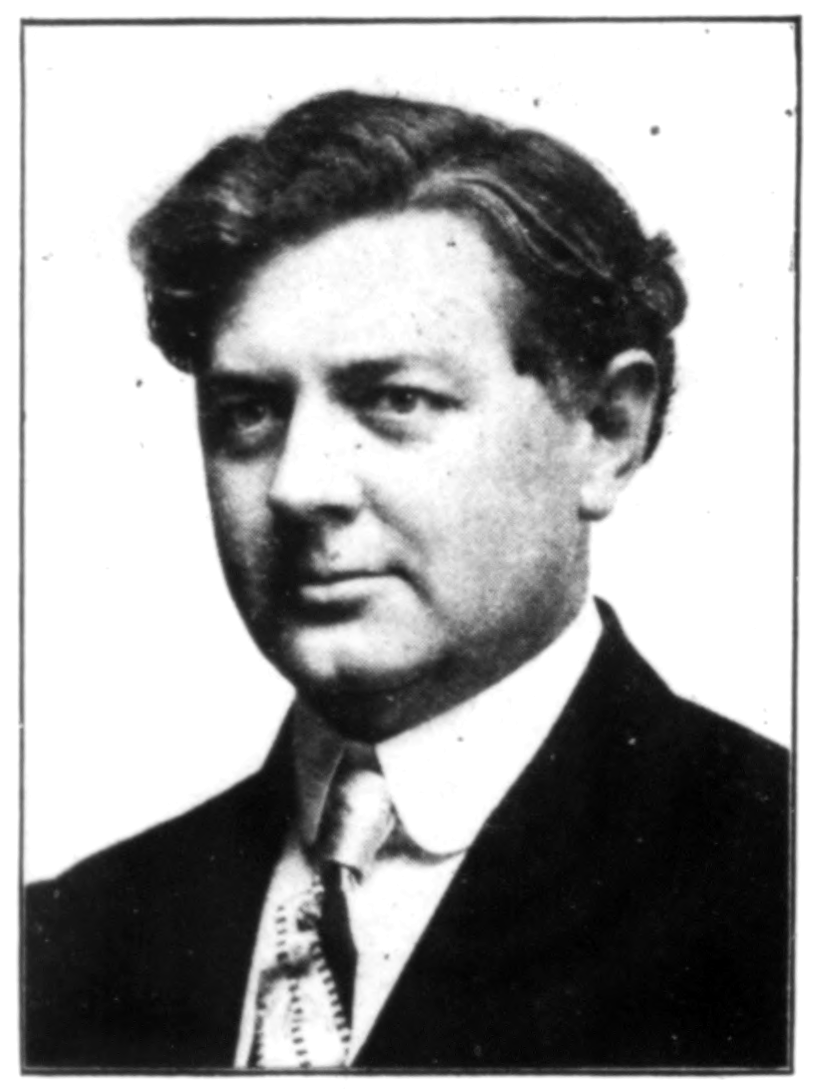
- Born: March 8, 1871; St. Clair County, Missouri
- Died: June 9, 1924 (aged 53); San Francisco, California
- Occupation: Novelist

Peter Clark MacFarlane (March 8, 1871 – June 9, 1924) was a novelist in the United States. The 1919 comedy film Molly of the Follies is based on his story "The Side-Show Girl". The 1924 film Tongues of Flame was adapted from his novel of the same name.

MacFarlane was born in Saint Clair County, Missouri on March 8, 1871. His initial employment was as a railroad clerk. He studied at Florida Agricultural College and then studied theology at a seminary in Berkeley, California, graduating in 1905. He took a position as a pastor in Alameda, California and was a minister for seven years. He also served as Secretary of the Brotherhood of Disciples of Christ. He left ministry to become an actor and lecturer.

In 1912 he wrote a critique of then-governor and Democratic Party presidential candidate Woodrow Wilson. In 1922 he was one of two speakers at a San Jose rally in support of Senator Johnson. MacFarlane corresponded with Theodore Roosevelt. Hiram Johnson considered MacFarlane among the best orators of his time.

With a goal of improving his writing, he joined the United States military during World War 1, entering Germany with the Second army division, then transferring to the Seventy-Seventh for action at Vesle, and then serving with the Marines at St. Mihiel. He spent 1921 and 1922 lecturing on the Chautauqua circuit.

MacFarlane shot himself in the head at the San Francisco morgue on June 9, 1924, leaving a note discussing his incurable kidney disease and mental toil regarding self-expression.

MacFarlane was frequently published in The American Magazine, Collier's, and the Saturday Evening Post where his articles on politics received significant attention.

MacFarlane was married twice. His first marriage to Emma D. Garfield ended with her death in 1908. He was married to his second wife Florence E. Judson at the time of his death.

== Bibliography ==
- The Quest of the Yellow Pearl
- The Centurion's Story
- Those Who Have Come Back
- Tongues of Flame
- The Crack in the Bell
- Held to Answer
- The Exploits of Bilge and Ma
