= Youthquake! =

Documentary film (1976)

Youthquake! is a 1976 documentary directed by Max B. Miller. It examines the influence of rock music on religious beliefs. It won the Golden Globe Award for Best Documentary Film at the 33rd Golden Globe Awards.
