= Ranger Bill Miller =

American actor (1878–1939)

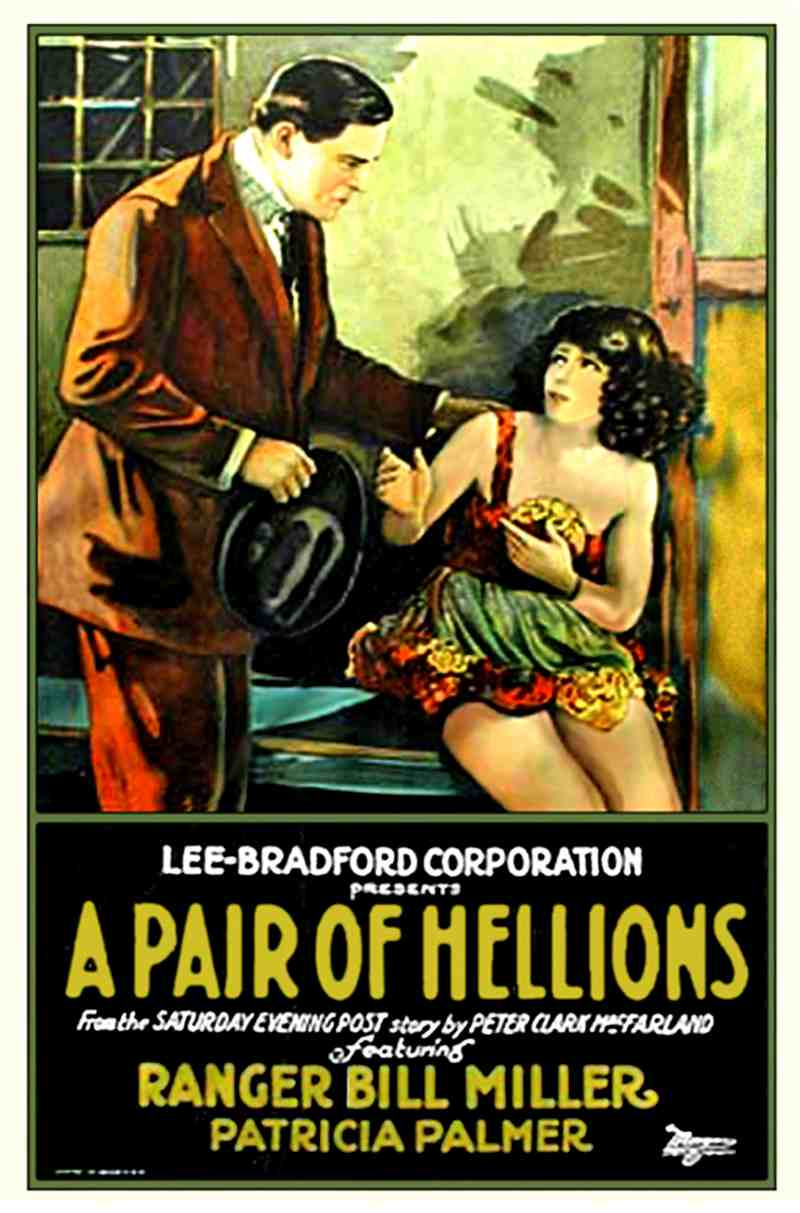
Poster for A Pair of Hellions (1924)

William Joseph "Ranger Bill" Miller (March 5, 1878 – November 12, 1939) was an American actor.

Miller was born in Kutztown, Pennsylvania. Prior to films, he was a Texas Ranger, and toured with Buffalo Bill's Wild West Show. He falsely claimed he was the adopted son of Buffalo Bill Cody, but this has been denied by both Cody's and Miller's descendants. He produced and appeared in the 1922 film The Fighting Ranger, and wrote and directed Guilty the same year. He had one son, Wendell. He died of a stroke in Los Angeles, California.

== Filmography ==
- The Fighting Ranger (1922)
- Guilty (1922)
- The Web of the Law (1923)
- A Pair of Hellions (1924)
- Heartbound (1925)
