= Altars of the World =

- Directed by: Lew Ayres
- Release date: 1976
- Running time: 150 minutes
- Country: United States
- Language: English
- Budget: $85,000

Altars of the World is a 1976 American documentary film. The film was created as a shorter version of the 1955 American documentary Altars of the East. Altars of the World was the last recipient of the Golden Globe Award for Best Documentary Film before the award was retired in 1977.

== Synopsis ==
Altars of the World is about the various religions of the world including Islam, Jainism and Sikhism. Throughout the documentary, the film features the religious practices and locations of global religions while providing interviews.

== Production ==
Actor Lew Ayres claimed he was inspired to create a film about world religions in the mid-1950s after having a religious experience with God. Originally titled Altars of the East, the documentary had a budget of $85,000 and took two years to be completed. Ayers and film technician Bob Duncan spent the first year filming the documentary while Ayers took another year to edit the film. An additional two years of filming was conducted in the mid-1970s after Ayers chose to create a shorter version of Altars of the East in 1973.

== Release ==
Altars of the East was released in 1955 as a nine hour long trilogy of films. Ayres released a version of Altars of the East reduced to a two and a half hour film under the name Altars of the World in 1976. After the documentary's theatrical debut on January 30, 1976, Altars of the World was later split into two VHS tapes titled Altars of the World: The Western Religions and Altars of the World: The Eastern Religions. Both of these tapes were released on May 25, 1999. DVD copies of the documentary were made available on December 9, 2003.

== Critical response ==
On the VHS tapes, Rob Ferrier of AllMovie said The Western Religions would be interesting for people who wanted to learn about the global influence of religion. On the other hand, Ferrier's colleague Clarke Fountain felt The Eastern Religions would be useful for viewers studying religious similarities but not for others learning about Christian based faiths.

== Accolades ==
Altars of the World was awarded the 1977 Golden Globe Award for Best Documentary Film. It was the last documentary to be presented this Golden Globe award when the category was discontinued in 1977.
