= Clea Koff =

Anthropologist

Clea Koff (born 1972) is a British-born American forensic anthropologist and author who worked several years for the United Nations International Criminal Tribunal for Rwanda (ICTR; 2 missions) and the International Criminal Tribunal for the former Yugoslavia (5 missions) in Rwanda, Bosnia, Croatia, Serbia, and in 2000 in Kosovo.

== Early life ==
Koff, who is mixed-race and Jewish, was born in 1972 to a Tanzanian mother, Msindo Mwinyipembe, and an American father, David Koff, both documentary filmmakers focused on human rights issues. Her parents took her and her older brother, Kimera, with them around the world. She spent her childhood in England, Kenya, Tanzania, Somalia, and the United States. By the time she was a teenager she had decided to study human osteology, which she did first in California. She earned her bachelor's degree in anthropology from Stanford University.

== Graduate school ==
Koff went on to the master's program in forensic anthropology at the University of Arizona. She completed her master's degree in 1999 at the University of Nebraska–Lincoln, after combining her studies with working for the UN between 1996 and 2000. As a 23-year-old graduate student studying prehistoric skeletons in California, Koff joined a small team of UN scientists exhuming victims of the genocide in Rwanda. Her job was to find evidence to bring the perpetrators to trial, and to help relatives to identify their loved ones.

== Books ==
Koff captured the events in her memoir The Bone Woman: Among the dead in Rwanda, Bosnia, Croatia and Kosovo (Random House) which was published in 2004 in the United States, United Kingdom, Australia, the Netherlands, Spain, Germany, Argentina, and Canada, 2005 in France and Denmark, 2006 in Norway, Italy, and Portugal, and 2007 in Poland.

Koff's crime fiction debut, Freezing, part of the Jayne & Steelie Mystery Series, was published by Severn House in the UK in August 2011 and in the US in December 2011. French rights for the book have been acquired by Editions Héloïse d'Ormesson. Passing is the title of the second book in the series, which is not yet published.

Koff is represented by Ellen Levine, Executive Vice President of Trident Media Group.

== Missing Persons Identification Resource Center ==
Koff founded in 2005 The Missing Persons Identification Resource Center (MPID), a non-profit organization, based in Los Angeles, which is about "essentially linking families with missing persons [in the US] with the Coroner's Office which hold thousands of unidentified bodies". The center closed in 2012.

When remains of Mitrice Richardson were recovered in Dark Canyon, Koff consulted on the case of the 24-year-old woman who went missing after being released from the Lost Hills Sheriff's Station. Koff raised objections regarding the handling of the remains during the investigation, and criticized the Los Angeles Sheriff's department suggestion that Richardson's clothing was removed by animals. Koff, with members of Richardson's family, found a finger bone of Richardson's at the site months after the coroner's second search of the area.
