= People of the Wind =

1976 film

- Theatrical release poster
- Produced by: Anthony Howarth; David Koff
- Narrated by: James Mason
- Cinematography: Michael Dodds
- Edited by: Carolyn Hicks
- Music by: G.T. Moore and Shusha Guppy
- Distributed by: Carolyn Films
- Release date: 1976
- Running time: 110 minutes
- Country: United States
- Language: English

The People of the Wind is also the title of a science fiction novel by Poul Anderson

People of the Wind is a 1976 American documentary film about the Bakhtiari people, produced by Anthony Howarth and David Koff. It was nominated for an Academy Award for Best Documentary Feature and also for a Golden Globe.

== Cast ==
- James Mason as narrator
