= Marjorie Best =

American costume designer

- Born: April 10, 1903; Jacksonville, Illinois, United States
- Died: June 14, 1997 (aged 94); Toluca Lake, California, United States
- Occupation: costume designer
- Years active: 1938–1965

Marjorie Best (10 April 1903 – 14 June 1997) was an American Hollywood costume designer known for her period designs.

Best was born in Jacksonville, Illinois, and studied at the Chouinard Art Institute. She taught school briefly before going to work for the Western Costume Company in 1926. She later moved to United Costumers. When that company was purchased by Warner Bros. in 1936, she was given a position in the studio's wardrobe department.

Her first film as a costume designer was Silver River (1948). She earned an Oscar for costume design in 1949 for her collaboration on the Errol Flynn film Adventures of Don Juan. She was nominated in 1956 for Giant, in 1960 for Sunrise at Campobello, and in 1965 for The Greatest Story Ever Told, the same year she retired.

Best died on June 14, 1997, in Toluca Lake, California, of a heart ailment.

== Academy Award nominations and wins ==
Year	Category	Title	Result	Notes	Ref.
1950	Best Costume Design, Color	Adventures of Don Juan	Won	Shared with Leah Rhodes and Travilla	
1957	Best Costume Design, Color	Giant	Nominated	Shared with Moss Mabry	
1961	Best Costume Design, Color	Sunrise at Campobello	Nominated		
1966	Best Costume Design, Color	The Greatest Story Ever Told	Nominated	Shared with Vittorio Nino Novarese	
