= Elois Jenssen =

American costume designer (1922–2004)

- Born: November 5, 1922; Palo Alto, California, U.S.
- Died: February 14, 2004 (aged 81); Los Angeles, California, U.S.
- Occupation: Costume designer
- Years active: 1943–1986

Elois Jenssen (November 5, 1922 – February 14, 2004) was an American film and television costume designer. She earned an Academy Award for design work in the Cecil B. DeMille production Samson and Delilah (1949) and an Academy Award nomination for her work on the Walt Disney Studios film Tron (1982).

== Background ==
Jenssen was born in Palo Alto, California. She attended the Westlake School for Girls before moving to Paris to study fashion at The New School's Parsons School of Design division. She returned to California after the start of World War II and enrolled at the Chouinard Art Institute.

== Career ==
She began her film career as an assistant costume designer in Hunt Stromberg's production company and received her first screen credit designing Hedy Lamarr's gowns for Dishonored Lady in 1947. She was designer on the film Lured starring Lucille Ball and thus began an association that ultimately lead to designing for I Love Lucy. In 1948, her design for a white fleece overcoat, electrically heated by batteries carried in two side pockets (with an extension cord that could be plugged in on planes or trains), was featured in a futuristic fashion show sponsored by the Los Angeles Fashion Group.

In 1951, Lucille Ball approached Jenssen and asked her if she would be interested in designing costumes for a new situation comedy she and her husband Desi Arnaz were readying for CBS. Under exclusive contract to 20th Century Fox at the time, she was unable to accept the offer, but after leaving the studio to freelance, she spent a season designing clothing for Ann Sothern on Private Secretary, then contacted Ball to see if the position on I Love Lucy was available. She was hired at $100 per episode, considerably less than her feature film salary, one week before the filming of the 1953-54 season began, and the following season her salary increased to $150. When she held out for $200 the next year, cost-conscious executives at Desilu replaced her. Her later television credits included designs for Julie Newmar in My Living Doll and Eleanor Parker in Bracken's World.

== Additional credits ==
- Samson and Delilah (1949)
- Cry Danger (1951)
- Phone Call from a Stranger (1952)
- We're Not Married! (1952)
- Forever, Darling (1956)
- Tron (1982)

== Awards and nominations ==
- 1950 Academy Award for Best Costume Design, Color (Samson and Delilah, winner) (shared with Edith Head, Dorothy Jeakins, Gile Steele and Gwen Wakeling)
- 1983 Academy Award for Best Costume Design (Tron, nominee) (shared with Rosanna Norton)
- 1983 Saturn Award for Best Costumes (Tron, winner) (shared with Rosanna Norton)
