= Academy Award for Best Costume Design =

Annual Academy Award for achievement in film costume design

- Country: United States
- Presented by: Academy of Motion Picture Arts and Sciences (AMPAS)
- First award: March 24, 1949; 77 years ago (for films released in 1948)
- Most recent winner: Kate Hawley; Frankenstein (2025)
- Website: oscars.org

The Academy Award for Best Costume Design is one of the Academy Awards presented annually by the Academy of Motion Picture Arts and Sciences (AMPAS) for achievement in film costume design.

The award was first given in 1949, for films made in 1948. Initially, separate award categories were established for black-and-white films and color films. Since the merger of the two categories in 1967, the Academy has traditionally avoided giving out the award to films with a contemporary setting.

== Award ==
The Academy Award for Best Costume Design is given out annually by the Academy of Motion Picture Arts & Sciences for the best achievement of film costume design of the previous year. Films that are eligible for the award must meet a series of criteria, including the requirement that the costumes must have been "conceived" by a costume designer. For this particular criteria, each submission is reviewed by the costume designer members of the Art Directors Branch prior to the ballot process. Further rules include that the nominee(s) be only the principal costume designer(s), that the five films that receive the highest number of votes will become the ceremony's nominations for final voting, and that the final voting will only be undertaken by active and life members of the academy.

== History ==
The Academy Award for Best Costume Design was first given out at the 21st Academy Awards, held on March 24, 1949. The award had two subcategories, one for films in black and white and one for films in color. At the 30th Academy Awards, held on March 26, 1958, these two subcategories were merged into one, which was the result of the academy reducing the number of competitive categories from 30 to 24. The 32nd Academy Awards saw the category again be split into two for recognition of both black and white and color film. Eight years later, the Academy Award for Best Costume Design, along with two other awards, were each combined into their own single category recognizing achievement in film.

From 1949 to 1966, most Academy Awards for Best Costume Design in Black and White were given to a contemporary movie. On the other hand, epics, fantasies, and musicals dominated the color category. Since the merger into one singular category for color films in 1967, films set in modern times have won only three times. The three contemporary-set winners have been Travels with My Aunt, All That Jazz, and The Adventures of Priscilla, Queen of the Desert. All other winners during this period have been set in the past or in a science-fiction or fantasy setting.

== Winners and nominees ==
indicates the winner

=== 1940s ===
Year	Film	Costume designer(s)
1948 (21st)	Black-and-White	
1948 (21st)	Hamlet	Roger K. Furse
1948 (21st)	B.F.'s Daughter	Irene
1948 (21st)	Color	
1948 (21st)	Joan of Arc	Dorothy Jeakins and Karinska
1948 (21st)	The Emperor Waltz	Edith Head and Gile Steele
1949 (22nd)	Black-and-White	
1949 (22nd)	The Heiress	Edith Head and Gile Steele
1949 (22nd)	Prince of Foxes	Vittorio Nino Novarese
1949 (22nd)	Color	
1949 (22nd)	Adventures of Don Juan	Leah Rhodes, Travilla and Marjorie Best
1949 (22nd)	Mother Is a Freshman	Kay Nelson

=== 1950s ===
Year	Film	Costume designer(s)
1950 (23rd)	Black-and-White	
1950 (23rd)	All About Eve	Edith Head and Charles LeMaire
1950 (23rd)	Born Yesterday	Jean Louis
1950 (23rd)	The Magnificent Yankee	Walter Plunkett
1950 (23rd)	Color	
1950 (23rd)	Samson and Delilah	Edith Head, Dorothy Jeakins, Elois Jenssen, Gile Steele and Gwen Wakeling
1950 (23rd)	The Black Rose	Michael Whittaker
1950 (23rd)	That Forsyte Woman	Walter Plunkett and Valles
1951 (24th)	Black-and-White	
1951 (24th)	A Place in the Sun	Edith Head
1951 (24th)	Kind Lady	Walter Plunkett and Gile Steele (posthumously)
1951 (24th)	The Model and the Marriage Broker	Charles LeMaire and Renié
1951 (24th)	The Mudlark	Edward Stevenson and Margaret Furse
1951 (24th)	A Streetcar Named Desire	Lucinda Ballard
1951 (24th)	Color	
1951 (24th)	An American in Paris	Orry-Kelly, Walter Plunkett and Irene Sharaff
1951 (24th)	David and Bathsheba	Charles LeMaire and Edward Stevenson
1951 (24th)	The Great Caruso	Helen Rose and Gile Steele (posthumously)
1951 (24th)	Quo Vadis	Herschel McCoy
1951 (24th)	Tales of Hoffmann	Hein Heckroth
1952 (25th)	Black-and-White	
1952 (25th)	The Bad and the Beautiful	Helen Rose
1952 (25th)	Affair in Trinidad	Jean Louis
1952 (25th)	Carrie	Edith Head
1952 (25th)	My Cousin Rachel	Charles LeMaire and Dorothy Jeakins
1952 (25th)	Sudden Fear	Sheila O'Brien
1952 (25th)	Color	
1952 (25th)	Moulin Rouge	Marcel Vertès
1952 (25th)	The Greatest Show on Earth	Edith Head, Dorothy Jeakins and Miles White
1952 (25th)	Hans Christian Andersen	Clavé, Mary Wills and Madame Karinska
1952 (25th)	The Merry Widow	Helen Rose and Gile Steele (posthumously)
1952 (25th)	With a Song in My Heart	Charles LeMaire
1953 (26th)	Black-and-White	
1953 (26th)	Roman Holiday	Edith Head
1953 (26th)	The Actress	Walter Plunkett
1953 (26th)	Dream Wife	Helen Rose and Herschel McCoy
1953 (26th)	From Here to Eternity	Jean Louis
1953 (26th)	The President's Lady	Charles LeMaire and Renié
1953 (26th)	Color	
1953 (26th)	The Robe	Charles LeMaire and Emile Santiago
1953 (26th)	The Band Wagon	Mary Ann Nyberg
1953 (26th)	Call Me Madam	Irene Sharaff
1953 (26th)	How to Marry a Millionaire	Charles LeMaire and Travilla
1953 (26th)	Young Bess	Walter Plunkett
1954 (27th)	Black-and-White	
1954 (27th)	Sabrina	Edith Head
1954 (27th)	The Earrings of Madame de...	Georges Annenkov and Rosine Delamare
1954 (27th)	Executive Suite	Helen Rose
1954 (27th)	Indiscretion of an American Wife	Christian Dior
1954 (27th)	It Should Happen to You	Jean Louis
1954 (27th)	Color	
1954 (27th)	Gate of Hell	Sanzo Wada
1954 (27th)	Brigadoon	Irene Sharaff
1954 (27th)	Desiree	Charles LeMaire and René Hubert
1954 (27th)	A Star Is Born	Jean Louis, Mary Ann Nyberg and Irene Sharaff
1954 (27th)	There's No Business Like Show Business	Charles LeMaire, William Travilla and Miles White
1955 (28th)	Black-and-White	
1955 (28th)	I'll Cry Tomorrow	Helen Rose
1955 (28th)	The Pickwick Papers	Beatrice Dawson
1955 (28th)	Queen Bee	Jean Louis
1955 (28th)	The Rose Tattoo	Edith Head
1955 (28th)	Ugetsu	Tadaoto Kainosho
1955 (28th)	Color	
1955 (28th)	Love Is a Many-Splendored Thing	Charles LeMaire
1955 (28th)	Guys and Dolls	Irene Sharaff
1955 (28th)	Interrupted Melody	Helen Rose
1955 (28th)	To Catch a Thief	Edith Head
1955 (28th)	The Virgin Queen	Charles LeMaire and Mary Wills
1956 (29th)	Black-and-White	
1956 (29th)	The Solid Gold Cadillac	Jean Louis
1956 (29th)	The Power and the Prize	Helen Rose
1956 (29th)	The Proud and Profane	Edith Head
1956 (29th)	Seven Samurai	Kohei Ezaki
1956 (29th)	Teenage Rebel	Charles LeMaire and Mary Wills
1956 (29th)	Color	
1956 (29th)	The King and I	Irene Sharaff
1956 (29th)	Around the World in 80 Days	Miles White
1956 (29th)	Giant	Moss Mabry and Marjorie Best
1956 (29th)	The Ten Commandments	Edith Head, Ralph Jester, John Jensen, Dorothy Jeakins and Arnold Friberg
1956 (29th)	War and Peace	Maria De Matteis
1957 (30th) (Note: In 1957 and 1958, black-and-white and color films competed in a combined Best Costume Design category.)	Les Girls	Orry-Kelly
1957 (30th)	An Affair to Remember	Charles LeMaire
1957 (30th)	Funny Face	Edith Head and Hubert de Givenchy
1957 (30th)	Pal Joey	Jean Louis
1957 (30th)	Raintree County	Walter Plunkett
1958 (31st)	Gigi	Cecil Beaton
1958 (31st)	Bell, Book and Candle	Jean Louis
1958 (31st)	The Buccaneer	Ralph Jester, Edith Head and John Jensen
1958 (31st)	A Certain Smile	Charles LeMaire and Mary Wills
1958 (31st)	Some Came Running	Walter Plunkett
1959 (32nd)	Black-and-White	
1959 (32nd)	Some Like It Hot	Orry-Kelly
1959 (32nd)	Career	Edith Head
1959 (32nd)	The Diary of Anne Frank	Charles LeMaire and Mary Wills
1959 (32nd)	The Gazebo	Helen Rose
1959 (32nd)	The Young Philadelphians	Howard Shoup
1959 (32nd)	Color	
1959 (32nd)	Ben-Hur	Elizabeth Haffenden
1959 (32nd)	The Best of Everything	Adele Palmer
1959 (32nd)	The Big Fisherman	Renié
1959 (32nd)	The Five Pennies	Edith Head
1959 (32nd)	Porgy and Bess	Irene Sharaff

=== 1960s ===
Year	Film	Costume designer(s)
1960 (33rd)	Black-and-White	
1960 (33rd)	The Facts of Life	Edith Head and Edward Stevenson
1960 (33rd)	Never on Sunday	Deni Vachlioti
1960 (33rd)	The Rise and Fall of Legs Diamond	Howard Shoup
1960 (33rd)	Seven Thieves	Bill Thomas
1960 (33rd)	The Virgin Spring	Marik Vos
1960 (33rd)	Color	
1960 (33rd)	Spartacus	Valles and Bill Thomas
1960 (33rd)	Can-Can	Irene Sharaff
1960 (33rd)	Midnight Lace	Irene
1960 (33rd)	Pepe	Edith Head
1960 (33rd)	Sunrise at Campobello	Marjorie Best
1961 (34th)	Black-and-White	
1961 (34th)	La Dolce Vita	Piero Gherardi
1961 (34th)	The Children's Hour	Dorothy Jeakins
1961 (34th)	Claudelle Inglish	Howard Shoup
1961 (34th)	Judgment at Nuremberg	Jean Louis
1961 (34th)	Yojimbo	Yoshirō Muraki
1961 (34th)	Color	
1961 (34th)	West Side Story	Irene Sharaff
1961 (34th)	Babes in Toyland	Bill Thomas
1961 (34th)	Back Street	Jean Louis
1961 (34th)	Flower Drum Song	Irene Sharaff
1961 (34th)	Pocketful of Miracles	Edith Head and Walter Plunkett
1962 (35th)	Black-and-White	
1962 (35th)	What Ever Happened to Baby Jane?	Norma Koch
1962 (35th)	Days of Wine and Roses	Don Feld
1962 (35th)	The Man Who Shot Liberty Valance	Edith Head
1962 (35th)	The Miracle Worker	Ruth Morley
1962 (35th)	Phaedra	Denny Vachlioti
1962 (35th)	Color	
1962 (35th)	The Wonderful World of the Brothers Grimm	Mary Wills
1962 (35th)	Bon Voyage!	Bill Thomas
1962 (35th)	Gypsy	Orry-Kelly
1962 (35th)	The Music Man	Dorothy Jeakins
1962 (35th)	My Geisha	Edith Head
1963 (36th)	Black-and-White	
1963 (36th)	8½	Piero Gherardi
1963 (36th)	Love with the Proper Stranger	Edith Head
1963 (36th)	The Stripper	Travilla
1963 (36th)	Toys in the Attic	Bill Thomas
1963 (36th)	Wives and Lovers	Edith Head
1963 (36th)	Color	
1963 (36th)	Cleopatra	Renié, Vittorio Nino Novarese and Irene Sharaff
1963 (36th)	The Cardinal	Donald Brooks
1963 (36th)	How the West Was Won	Walter Plunkett
1963 (36th)	The Leopard	Piero Tosi
1963 (36th)	A New Kind of Love	Edith Head
1964 (37th)	Black-and-White	
1964 (37th)	The Night of the Iguana	Dorothy Jeakins
1964 (37th)	A House Is Not a Home	Edith Head
1964 (37th)	Hush...Hush, Sweet Charlotte	Norma Koch
1964 (37th)	Kisses for My President	Howard Shoup
1964 (37th)	The Visit	René Hubert
1964 (37th)	Color	
1964 (37th)	My Fair Lady	Cecil Beaton
1964 (37th)	Becket	Margaret Furse
1964 (37th)	Mary Poppins	Tony Walton
1964 (37th)	The Unsinkable Molly Brown	Morton Haack
1964 (37th)	What a Way to Go!	Edith Head and Moss Mabry
1965 (38th)	Black-and-White	
1965 (38th)	Darling	Julie Harris
1965 (38th)	Morituri	Moss Mabry
1965 (38th)	A Rage to Live	Howard Shoup
1965 (38th)	Ship of Fools	Jean Louis and Bill Thomas
1965 (38th)	The Slender Thread	Edith Head
1965 (38th)	Color	
1965 (38th)	Doctor Zhivago	Phyllis Dalton
1965 (38th)	The Agony and the Ecstasy	Vittorio Nino Novarese
1965 (38th)	The Greatest Story Ever Told	Marjorie Best and Vittorio Nino Novarese
1965 (38th)	Inside Daisy Clover	Edith Head and Bill Thomas
1965 (38th)	The Sound of Music	Dorothy Jeakins
1966 (39th)	Black-and-White	
1966 (39th)	Who's Afraid of Virginia Woolf?	Irene Sharaff
1966 (39th)	The Gospel According to St. Matthew	Danilo Donati
1966 (39th)	Mandragola	Danilo Donati
1966 (39th)	Mister Buddwing	Helen Rose
1966 (39th)	Morgan!	Jocelyn Rickards
1966 (39th)	Color	
1966 (39th)	A Man for All Seasons	Elizabeth Haffenden and Joan Bridge
1966 (39th)	Gambit	Jean Louis
1966 (39th)	Juliet of the Spirits	Piero Gherardi
1966 (39th)	Hawaii	Dorothy Jeakins
1966 (39th)	The Oscar	Edith Head
1967 (40th)	Camelot	John Truscott
1967 (40th)	Bonnie and Clyde	Theadora Van Runkle
1967 (40th)	The Happiest Millionaire	Bill Thomas
1967 (40th)	The Taming of the Shrew	Danilo Donati and Irene Sharaff
1967 (40th)	Thoroughly Modern Millie	Jean Louis
1968 (41st)	Romeo and Juliet	Danilo Donati
1968 (41st)	The Lion in Winter	Margaret Furse
1968 (41st)	Oliver!	Phyllis Dalton
1968 (41st)	Planet of the Apes	Morton Haack
1968 (41st)	Star!	Donald Brooks
1969 (42nd)	Anne of the Thousand Days	Margaret Furse
1969 (42nd)	Gaily, Gaily	Ray Aghayan
1969 (42nd)	Hello, Dolly!	Irene Sharaff
1969 (42nd)	Sweet Charity	Edith Head
1969 (42nd)	They Shoot Horses, Don't They?	Donfeld

=== 1970s ===
Year	Film	Costume designer(s)
1970 (43rd)	Cromwell	Vittorio Nino Novarese
1970 (43rd)	Airport	Edith Head
1970 (43rd)	Darling Lili	Jack Bear and Donald Brooks
1970 (43rd)	The Hawaiians	Bill Thomas
1970 (43rd)	Scrooge	Margaret Furse
1971 (44th)	Nicholas and Alexandra	Yvonne Blake and Antonio Castillo
1971 (44th)	Bedknobs and Broomsticks	Bill Thomas
1971 (44th)	Death in Venice	Piero Tosi
1971 (44th)	Mary, Queen of Scots	Margaret Furse
1971 (44th)	What's the Matter with Helen?	Morton Haack
1972 (45th)	Travels with My Aunt	Anthony Powell
1972 (45th)	The Godfather	Anna Hill Johnstone
1972 (45th)	Lady Sings the Blues	Ray Aghayan, Norma Koch and Bob Mackie
1972 (45th)	The Poseidon Adventure	Paul Zastupnevich
1972 (45th)	Young Winston	Anthony Mendleson
1973 (46th)	The Sting	Edith Head
1973 (46th)	Cries and Whispers	Marik Vos
1973 (46th)	Ludwig	Piero Tosi
1973 (46th)	Tom Sawyer	Donfeld
1973 (46th)	The Way We Were	Dorothy Jeakins and Moss Mabry
1974 (47th)	The Great Gatsby	Theoni V. Aldredge
1974 (47th)	Chinatown	Anthea Sylbert
1974 (47th)	Daisy Miller	John Furniss
1974 (47th)	The Godfather Part II	Theadora Van Runkle
1974 (47th)	Murder on the Orient Express	Tony Walton
1975 (48th)	Barry Lyndon	Milena Canonero and Ulla-Britt Söderlund
1975 (48th)	The Four Musketeers	Yvonne Blake and Ron Talsky (Note: Yvonne Blake publicly complained about sharing a nomination with Ron Talsky for The Four Musketeers. She alleged that he "only designed one creation for Raquel Welch" for the preceding film The Three Musketeers. "Talsky was in no way involved creatively on the second picture," she said, but he retained his Oscar nomination because of his on-screen credit as costume designer for Welch.)
1975 (48th)	Funny Lady	Ray Aghayan and Bob Mackie
1975 (48th)	The Magic Flute	Karin Erskine and Henny Noremark
1975 (48th)	The Man Who Would Be King	Edith Head
1976 (49th)	Fellini's Casanova	Danilo Donati
1976 (49th)	Bound for Glory	William Ware Theiss
1976 (49th)	The Incredible Sarah	Anthony Mendleson
1976 (49th)	The Passover Plot	Mary Wills
1976 (49th)	The Seven-Per-Cent Solution	Alan Barrett
1977 (50th)	Star Wars	John Mollo
1977 (50th)	Airport '77	Edith Head and Burton Miller
1977 (50th)	Julia	Anthea Sylbert
1977 (50th)	A Little Night Music	Florence Klotz
1977 (50th)	The Other Side of Midnight	Irene Sharaff
1978 (51st)	Death on the Nile	Anthony Powell
1978 (51st)	Caravans	Renié
1978 (51st)	Days of Heaven	Patricia Norris
1978 (51st)	The Swarm	Paul Zastupnevich
1978 (51st)	The Wiz	Tony Walton
1979 (52nd)	All That Jazz	Albert Wolsky
1979 (52nd)	Agatha	Shirley Ann Russell
1979 (52nd)	Butch and Sundance: The Early Days	William Ware Theiss
1979 (52nd)	La Cage aux Folles	Ambra Danon and Piero Tosi
1979 (52nd)	The Europeans	Judy Moorcroft

=== 1980s ===
Year	Film	Costume designer(s)
1980 (53rd)	Tess	Anthony Powell
1980 (53rd)	The Elephant Man	Patricia Norris
1980 (53rd)	My Brilliant Career	Anna Senior
1980 (53rd)	Somewhere in Time	Jean-Pierre Dorleac
1980 (53rd)	When Time Ran Out	Paul Zastupnevich
1981 (54th)	Chariots of Fire	Milena Canonero
1981 (54th)	The French Lieutenant's Woman	Tom Rand
1981 (54th)	Pennies from Heaven	Bob Mackie
1981 (54th)	Ragtime	Anna Hill Johnstone
1981 (54th)	Reds	Shirley Ann Russell
1982 (55th)	Gandhi	Bhanu Athaiya and John Mollo
1982 (55th)	Sophie's Choice	Albert Wolsky
1982 (55th)	La Traviata	Piero Tosi
1982 (55th)	Tron	Elois Jenssen and Rosanna Norton
1982 (55th)	Victor/Victoria	Patricia Norris
1983 (56th)	Fanny and Alexander	Marik Vos-Lundh
1983 (56th)	Cross Creek	Joe I. Tompkins
1983 (56th)	Heart Like a Wheel	William Ware Theiss
1983 (56th)	The Return of Martin Guerre	Anne-Marie Marchand
1983 (56th)	Zelig	Santo Loquasto
1984 (57th)	Amadeus	Theodor Pištěk
1984 (57th)	2010	Patricia Norris
1984 (57th)	The Bostonians	Jenny Beavan and John Bright
1984 (57th)	A Passage to India	Judy Moorcroft
1984 (57th)	Places in the Heart	Ann Roth
1985 (58th)	Ran	Emi Wada
1985 (58th)	The Color Purple	Aggie Guerard Rodgers
1985 (58th)	The Journey of Natty Gann	Albert Wolsky
1985 (58th)	Out of Africa	Milena Canonero
1985 (58th)	Prizzi's Honor	Donfeld
1986 (59th)	A Room with a View	Jenny Beavan and John Bright
1986 (59th)	The Mission	Enrico Sabbatini
1986 (59th)	Otello	Anna Anni and Maurizio Millenotti
1986 (59th)	Peggy Sue Got Married	Theadora Van Runkle
1986 (59th)	Pirates	Anthony Powell
1987 (60th)	The Last Emperor	James Acheson
1987 (60th)	The Dead	Dorothy Jeakins
1987 (60th)	Empire of the Sun	Bob Ringwood
1987 (60th)	Maurice	Jenny Beavan and John Bright
1987 (60th)	The Untouchables	Marilyn Vance-Straker
1988 (61st)	Dangerous Liaisons	James Acheson
1988 (61st)	Coming to America	Deborah Nadoolman
1988 (61st)	A Handful of Dust	Jane Robinson
1988 (61st)	Sunset	Patricia Norris
1988 (61st)	Tucker: The Man and His Dream	Milena Canonero
1989 (62nd)	Henry V	Phyllis Dalton
1989 (62nd)	The Adventures of Baron Munchausen	Gabriella Pescucci
1989 (62nd)	Driving Miss Daisy	Elizabeth McBride
1989 (62nd)	Harlem Nights	Joe I. Tompkins
1989 (62nd)	Valmont	Theodor Pištěk

=== 1990s ===
Year	Film	Costume designer(s)
1990 (63rd)	Cyrano de Bergerac	Franca Squarciapino
1990 (63rd)	Avalon	Gloria Gresham
1990 (63rd)	Dances With Wolves	Elsa Zamparelli
1990 (63rd)	Dick Tracy	Milena Canonero
1990 (63rd)	Hamlet	Maurizio Millenotti
1991 (64th)	Bugsy	Albert Wolsky
1991 (64th)	The Addams Family	Ruth Myers
1991 (64th)	Barton Fink	Richard Hornung
1991 (64th)	Hook	Anthony Powell
1991 (64th)	Madame Bovary	Corinne Jorry
1992 (65th)	Bram Stoker's Dracula	Eiko Ishioka
1992 (65th)	Enchanted April	Sheena Napier
1992 (65th)	Howards End	Jenny Beavan and John Bright
1992 (65th)	Malcolm X	Ruth E. Carter
1992 (65th)	Toys	Albert Wolsky
1993 (66th)	The Age of Innocence	Gabriella Pescucci
1993 (66th)	Orlando	Sandy Powell
1993 (66th)	The Piano	Janet Patterson
1993 (66th)	The Remains of the Day	Jenny Beavan and John Bright
1993 (66th)	Schindler's List	Anna B. Sheppard
1994 (67th)	The Adventures of Priscilla, Queen of the Desert	Tim Chappel and Lizzy Gardiner
1994 (67th)	Bullets Over Broadway	Jeffrey Kurland
1994 (67th)	Little Women	Colleen Atwood
1994 (67th)	Maverick	April Ferry
1994 (67th)	Queen Margot	Moidele Bickel
1995 (68th)	Restoration	James Acheson
1995 (68th)	12 Monkeys	Julie Weiss
1995 (68th)	Braveheart	Charles Knode
1995 (68th)	Richard III	Shuna Harwood
1995 (68th)	Sense and Sensibility	Jenny Beavan and John Bright
1996 (69th)	The English Patient	Ann Roth
1996 (69th)	Angels & Insects	Paul Brown
1996 (69th)	Emma	Ruth Myers
1996 (69th)	Hamlet	Alexandra Byrne
1996 (69th)	The Portrait of a Lady	Janet Patterson
1997 (70th)	Titanic	Deborah Lynn Scott
1997 (70th)	Amistad	Ruth E. Carter
1997 (70th)	Kundun	Dante Ferretti
1997 (70th)	Oscar and Lucinda	Janet Patterson
1997 (70th)	The Wings of the Dove	Sandy Powell
1998 (71st)	Shakespeare in Love	Sandy Powell
1998 (71st)	Beloved	Colleen Atwood
1998 (71st)	Elizabeth	Alexandra Byrne
1998 (71st)	Pleasantville	Judianna Makovsky
1998 (71st)	Velvet Goldmine	Sandy Powell
1999 (72nd)	Topsy-Turvy	Lindy Hemming
1999 (72nd)	Anna and the King	Jenny Beavan
1999 (72nd)	Sleepy Hollow	Colleen Atwood
1999 (72nd)	The Talented Mr. Ripley	Gary Jones and Ann Roth
1999 (72nd)	Titus	Milena Canonero

=== 2000s ===
Year	Film	Costume designer(s)
2000 (73rd)	Gladiator	Janty Yates
2000 (73rd)	102 Dalmatians	Anthony Powell
2000 (73rd)	Crouching Tiger, Hidden Dragon	Tim Yip
2000 (73rd)	How the Grinch Stole Christmas	Rita Ryack
2000 (73rd)	Quills	Jacqueline West
2001 (74th)	Moulin Rouge!	Catherine Martin and Angus Strathie
2001 (74th)	The Affair of the Necklace	Milena Canonero
2001 (74th)	Gosford Park	Jenny Beavan
2001 (74th)	Harry Potter and the Sorcerer's Stone	Judianna Makovsky
2001 (74th)	The Lord of the Rings: The Fellowship of the Ring	Ngila Dickson and Richard Taylor
2002 (75th)	Chicago	Colleen Atwood
2002 (75th)	Frida	Julie Weiss
2002 (75th)	Gangs of New York	Sandy Powell
2002 (75th)	The Hours	Ann Roth
2002 (75th)	The Pianist	Anna B. Sheppard
2003 (76th)	The Lord of the Rings: The Return of the King	Ngila Dickson and Richard Taylor
2003 (76th)	Girl with a Pearl Earring	Dien van Straalen
2003 (76th)	The Last Samurai	Ngila Dickson
2003 (76th)	Master and Commander: The Far Side of the World	Wendy Stites
2003 (76th)	Seabiscuit	Judianna Makovsky
2004 (77th)	The Aviator	Sandy Powell
2004 (77th)	Finding Neverland	Alexandra Byrne
2004 (77th)	Lemony Snicket's A Series of Unfortunate Events	Colleen Atwood
2004 (77th)	Ray	Sharen Davis
2004 (77th)	Troy	Bob Ringwood
2005 (78th)	Memoirs of a Geisha	Colleen Atwood
2005 (78th)	Charlie and the Chocolate Factory	Gabriella Pescucci
2005 (78th)	Mrs Henderson Presents	Sandy Powell
2005 (78th)	Pride & Prejudice	Jacqueline Durran
2005 (78th)	Walk the Line	Arianne Phillips
2006 (79th)	Marie Antoinette	Milena Canonero
2006 (79th)	Curse of the Golden Flower	Chung Man Yee
2006 (79th)	The Devil Wears Prada	Patricia Field
2006 (79th)	Dreamgirls	Sharen Davis
2006 (79th)	The Queen	Consolata Boyle
2007 (80th)	Elizabeth: The Golden Age	Alexandra Byrne
2007 (80th)	Across the Universe	Albert Wolsky
2007 (80th)	Atonement	Jacqueline Durran
2007 (80th)	La Vie en Rose	Marit Allen (posthumously)
2007 (80th)	Sweeney Todd: The Demon Barber of Fleet Street	Colleen Atwood
2008 (81st)	The Duchess	Michael O'Connor
2008 (81st)	Australia	Catherine Martin
2008 (81st)	The Curious Case of Benjamin Button	Jacqueline West
2008 (81st)	Milk	Danny Glicker
2008 (81st)	Revolutionary Road	Albert Wolsky
2009 (82nd)	The Young Victoria	Sandy Powell
2009 (82nd)	Bright Star	Janet Patterson
2009 (82nd)	Coco Before Chanel	Catherine Leterrier
2009 (82nd)	The Imaginarium of Doctor Parnassus	Monique Prudhomme
2009 (82nd)	Nine	Colleen Atwood

=== 2010s ===
Year	Film	Costume designer(s)
2010 (83rd)	Alice in Wonderland	Colleen Atwood
2010 (83rd)	I Am Love	Antonella Cannarozzi
2010 (83rd)	The King's Speech	Jenny Beavan
2010 (83rd)	The Tempest	Sandy Powell
2010 (83rd)	True Grit	Mary Zophres
2011 (84th)	The Artist	Mark Bridges
2011 (84th)	Anonymous	Lisy Christl
2011 (84th)	Hugo	Sandy Powell
2011 (84th)	Jane Eyre	Michael O'Connor
2011 (84th)	W.E.	Arianne Phillips
2012 (85th)	Anna Karenina	Jacqueline Durran
2012 (85th)	Les Misérables	Paco Delgado
2012 (85th)	Lincoln	Joanna Johnston
2012 (85th)	Mirror Mirror	Eiko Ishioka (posthumously)
2012 (85th)	Snow White and the Huntsman	Colleen Atwood
2013 (86th)	The Great Gatsby	Catherine Martin
2013 (86th)	American Hustle	Michael Wilkinson
2013 (86th)	The Grandmaster	William Chang Suk Ping
2013 (86th)	The Invisible Woman	Michael O'Connor
2013 (86th)	12 Years a Slave	Patricia Norris
2014 (87th)	The Grand Budapest Hotel	Milena Canonero
2014 (87th)	Inherent Vice	Mark Bridges
2014 (87th)	Into the Woods	Colleen Atwood
2014 (87th)	Maleficent	Anna B. Sheppard and Jane Clive
2014 (87th)	Mr. Turner	Jacqueline Durran
2015 (88th)	Mad Max: Fury Road	Jenny Beavan
2015 (88th)	Carol	Sandy Powell
2015 (88th)	Cinderella	Sandy Powell
2015 (88th)	The Danish Girl	Paco Delgado
2015 (88th)	The Revenant	Jacqueline West
2016 (89th)	Fantastic Beasts and Where to Find Them	Colleen Atwood
2016 (89th)	Allied	Joanna Johnston
2016 (89th)	Florence Foster Jenkins	Consolata Boyle
2016 (89th)	Jackie	Madeline Fontaine
2016 (89th)	La La Land	Mary Zophres
2017 (90th)	Phantom Thread	Mark Bridges
2017 (90th)	Beauty and the Beast	Jacqueline Durran
2017 (90th)	Darkest Hour	Jacqueline Durran
2017 (90th)	The Shape of Water	Luis Sequeira
2017 (90th)	Victoria & Abdul	Consolata Boyle
2018 (91st)	Black Panther	Ruth E. Carter
2018 (91st)	The Ballad of Buster Scruggs	Mary Zophres
2018 (91st)	The Favourite	Sandy Powell
2018 (91st)	Mary Poppins Returns	Sandy Powell
2018 (91st)	Mary Queen of Scots	Alexandra Byrne
2019 (92nd)	Little Women	Jacqueline Durran
2019 (92nd)	The Irishman	Sandy Powell and Christopher Peterson
2019 (92nd)	Jojo Rabbit	Mayes C. Rubeo
2019 (92nd)	Joker	Mark Bridges
2019 (92nd)	Once Upon a Time in Hollywood	Arianne Phillips

=== 2020s ===
Year	Film	Costume designer(s)
2020/21 (93rd)	Ma Rainey's Black Bottom	Ann Roth
2020/21 (93rd)	Emma	Alexandra Byrne
2020/21 (93rd)	Mank	Trish Summerville
2020/21 (93rd)	Mulan	Bina Daigeler
2020/21 (93rd)	Pinocchio	Massimo Cantini Parrini
2021 (94th)	Cruella	Jenny Beavan
2021 (94th)	Cyrano	Massimo Cantini Parrini and Jacqueline Durran
2021 (94th)	Dune	Jacqueline West and Bob Morgan
2021 (94th)	Nightmare Alley	Luis Sequeira
2021 (94th)	West Side Story	Paul Tazewell
2022 (95th)	Black Panther: Wakanda Forever	Ruth E. Carter
2022 (95th)	Babylon	Mary Zophres
2022 (95th)	Elvis	Catherine Martin
2022 (95th)	Everything Everywhere All at Once	Shirley Kurata
2022 (95th)	Mrs. Harris Goes to Paris	Jenny Beavan
2023 (96th)	Poor Things	Holly Waddington
2023 (96th)	Barbie	Jacqueline Durran
2023 (96th)	Killers of the Flower Moon	Jacqueline West
2023 (96th)	Napoleon	Janty Yates and Dave Crossman
2023 (96th)	Oppenheimer	Ellen Mirojnick
2024 (97th)	Wicked	Paul Tazewell
2024 (97th)	A Complete Unknown	Arianne Phillips
2024 (97th)	Conclave	Lisy Christl
2024 (97th)	Gladiator II	Janty Yates and Dave Crossman
2024 (97th)	Nosferatu	Linda Muir
2025 (98th)	Frankenstein	Kate Hawley
2025 (98th)	Avatar: Fire and Ash	Deborah L. Scott
2025 (98th)	Hamnet	Malgosia Turzanska
2025 (98th)	Marty Supreme	Miyako Bellizzi
2025 (98th)	Sinners	Ruth E. Carter

== Shortlisted finalists ==
Finalists for Best Costume Design were selected by branch members, who voted for ten finalists which were screened to determine the five nominees.

Year	Finalists	Ref
1965	Black-and-White: Mirage; Color: Do Not Disturb, Marriage on the Rocks, Never Too Late, Shenandoah, Strange Bedfellows	
1966	Black-and-White: Before Dawn, Love and Marriage, Red Beard; Color: An American Dream, Follow Me, Boys!, The Sand Pebbles, 7 Women, Way...Way Out	
1967	Doctor Dolittle, Hotel, More Than a Miracle, Valley of the Dolls, The Way West	
1968	Funny Girl, Great Catherine, The One and Only, Genuine, Original Family Band, The Sea Gull, War and Peace	
1969	Bob & Carol & Ted & Alice, Goodbye, Mr. Chips, Oh! What a Lovely War, The Reivers, The Royal Hunt of the Sun	
1970	Beneath the Planet of the Apes, The Great White Hope, Little Big Man, Myra Breckinridge, Rio Lobo	
1971	The Grissom Gang, The Love Machine, Plaza Suite	
1972	Cabaret, Fellini's Roma, Pete 'n' Tillie, Savage Messiah, 1776	
1973	The Iceman Cometh, Jesus Christ Superstar, The Nelson Affair, The New Land, Oklahoma Crude	
1974	Airport 1975, Earthquake, The Front Page, The Island at the Top of the World, The Towering Inferno	
1975	Amarcord, The Day of the Locust, Hard Times, Once Is Not Enough, Tommy	
1976	Buffalo Bill and the Indians, or Sitting Bull's History Lesson, Logan's Run, Silent Movie, Swashbuckler, Voyage of the Damned	
1977	High Anxiety, The Island of Dr. Moreau, The Last Remake of Beau Geste, 1900, The Slipper and the Rose	
1978	Autumn Sonata, The Big Fix, Goin' South, Grease, House Calls	
1979	The Black Hole, Hair, The Rose, Star Trek: The Motion Picture, Sunburn	

== Superlatives ==
Category	Name	Superlative	Notes
Most Awards	Edith Head	8 awards	Awards resulted from 35 nominations
Most Nominations	Edith Head	35 nominations	Nominations resulted in 8 awards
Most Nominations (without ever winning)	Patricia Norris	6 nominations	Nominations resulted in no awards

=== Age superlatives ===
Record	Designer	Film	Age
Oldest winner	Ann Roth	Ma Rainey's Black Bottom	89 years, 177 days
Oldest nominee	Ann Roth	Ma Rainey's Black Bottom	89 years, 136 days
Youngest winner	Elois Jenssen	Samson and Delilah	28 years, 144 days
Youngest nominee	Elois Jenssen	Samson and Delilah	28 years, 99 days

== Multiple wins and nominations ==
The following 97 designers have received multiple nominations for the Academy Award for Best Costume Design. This list is sorted by the number of total awards (with the number of total nominations listed in parentheses).

- 8: Edith Head (35)
- 5: Irene Sharaff (15)
- 4: Colleen Atwood (12)
- 4: Milena Canonero (9)
- 3: Charles LeMaire (16)
- 3: Sandy Powell (15)
- 3: Jenny Beavan (12)
- 3: Dorothy Jeakins (12)
- 3: Anthony Powell (6)
- 3: Orry-Kelly (4)
- 3: James Acheson (3)
- 2: Helen Rose (10)
- 2: Jacqueline Durran (9)
- 2: Albert Wolsky (7)
- 2: Gile Steele (6)
- 2: Ruth E. Carter (5)
- 2: Danilo Donati (5)
- 2: Vittorio Nino Novarese (5)
- 2: Ann Roth (5)
- 2: Mark Bridges (4)
- 2: Catherine Martin (4)
- 2: Phyllis Dalton (3)
- 2: Piero Gherardi (3)
- 2: Cecil Beaton (2)
- 2: Elizabeth Haffenden (2)
- 2: John Mollo (2)
- 1: Jean Louis (14)
- 1: Walter Plunkett (10)
- 1: Bill Thomas (10)
- 1: Mary Wills (7)
- 1: John Bright (6)
- 1: Alexandra Byrne (6)
- 1: Margaret Furse (6)
- 1: Renie Conley (5)
- 1: Marjorie Best (4)
- 1: William Travilla (4)
- 1: Ngila Dickson (3)
- 1: Norma Koch (3)
- 1: Michael O'Connor (3)
- 1: Gabriella Pescucci (3)
- 1: Edward Stevenson (3)
- 1: Marik Vos (3)
- 1: Janty Yates (3)
- 1: Yvonne Blake (2)
- 1: Eiko Ishioka (2)
- 1: Elois Jenssen (2)
- 1: Barbara Karinska (2)
- 1: Theodor Pištěk (2)
- 1: Deborah L. Scott (2)
- 1: Richard Taylor (2)
- 1: Paul Tazewell (2)
- 1: Arlington Valles (2)
- 0: Patricia Norris (6)
- 0: Howard Shoup (5)
- 0: Piero Tosi (5)
- 0: Jacqueline West (5)
- 0: Donfeld (4)
- 0: Moss Mabry (4)
- 0: Janet Patterson (4)
- 0: Arianne Phillips (4)
- 0: Mary Zophres (4)
- 0: Ray Aghayan (3)
- 0: Consolata Boyle (3)
- 0: Donald Brooks (3)
- 0: Morton Haack (3)
- 0: Bob Mackie (3)
- 0: Judianna Makovsky (3)
- 0: Anna B. Sheppard (3)
- 0: William Ware Theiss (3)
- 0: Theadora Van Runkle (3)
- 0: Tony Walton (3)
- 0: Miles White (3)
- 0: Paul Zastupnevich (3)
- 0: Lisy Christl (2)
- 0: Dave Crossman (2)
- 0: Sharen Davis (2)
- 0: Paco Delgado (2)
- 0: René Hubert (2)
- 0: John Jensen (2)
- 0: Ralph Jester (2)
- 0: Joanna Johnston (2)
- 0: Anna Hill Johnstone (2)
- 0: Irene Lentz (2)
- 0: Anthony Mendleson (2)
- 0: Herschel McCoy (2)
- 0: Maurizio Millenotti (2)
- 0: Judy Moorcroft (2)
- 0: Ruth Myers (2)
- 0: Mary Ann Nyberg (2)
- 0: Massimo Cantini Parrini (2)
- 0: Bob Ringwood (2)
- 0: Shirley Ann Russell (2)
- 0: Luis Sequeira (2)
- 0: Anthea Sylbert (2)
- 0: Joe I. Tompkins (2)
- 0: Deni (or Denny) Vachlioti (2)
- 0: Julie Weiss (2)

== See also ==
- BAFTA Award for Best Costume Design
- Costume Designers Guild Awards
- Critics' Choice Movie Award for Best Costume Design
- Saturn Award for Best Costume Design
- List of Academy Award–nominated films
