= Mary Wills (costume designer) =

American costume designer (1914–1997)

Mary Wills (July 4, 1914 – February 7, 1997) was an American costume designer.

Wills was born in Prescott, Arizona. In the 1930s, her family moved to Albuquerque, New Mexico.

Willis studied at the University of Arizona before completing her bachelor's degree at the University of New Mexico. She began her career creating sets and costumes at the University of New Mexico in Albuquerque. She went on to earn a master's degree at the Yale University Art and Drama School.

Her first job in Hollywood was working as a sketch artist on Gone with the Wind.

She was nominated for an Oscar seven times, earning the Academy Award for her colorful designs for The Wonderful World of the Brothers Grimm in 1962. In addition to designing for film, she has also worked on live shows, including Shipstads & Johnson's Ice Follies and the New Buffalo Bill Wild West Show.

Wills died in Sedona, Arizona, at age 82 of renal failure. Her original sketches are part of the collection at Los Angeles County Museum of Art.

== Academy Award nominations and wins ==
Year	Category	Title	Result	Notes	Ref.
1953	Best Costume Design, Color	Hans Christian Andersen	Nominated	Shared with Clavé and Madame Karinska	
1956	Best Costume Design, Color	The Virgin Queen	Nominated	Shared with Charles LeMaire	
1957	Best Costume Design, Black-and-White	Teenage Rebel	Nominated	Shared with Charles LeMaire	
1959	Best Costume Design, Black-and-White or Color	A Certain Smile	Nominated	Shared with Charles LeMaire	
1960	Best Costume Design, Black-and-White	The Diary of Anne Frank	Nominated	Shared with Charles LeMaire	
1963	Best Costume Design, Color	The Wonderful World of the Brothers Grimm	Won		
1977	Best Costume Design	The Passover Plot	Nominated		
