= René Hubert (costume designer) =

Swiss costume designer

- Born: October 7, 1895; Frauenfeld, Switzerland
- Died: June 1976 (aged 80); New York City
- Other name: Rene Hubert
- Occupation: Costume Designer
- Years active: 1925–1964

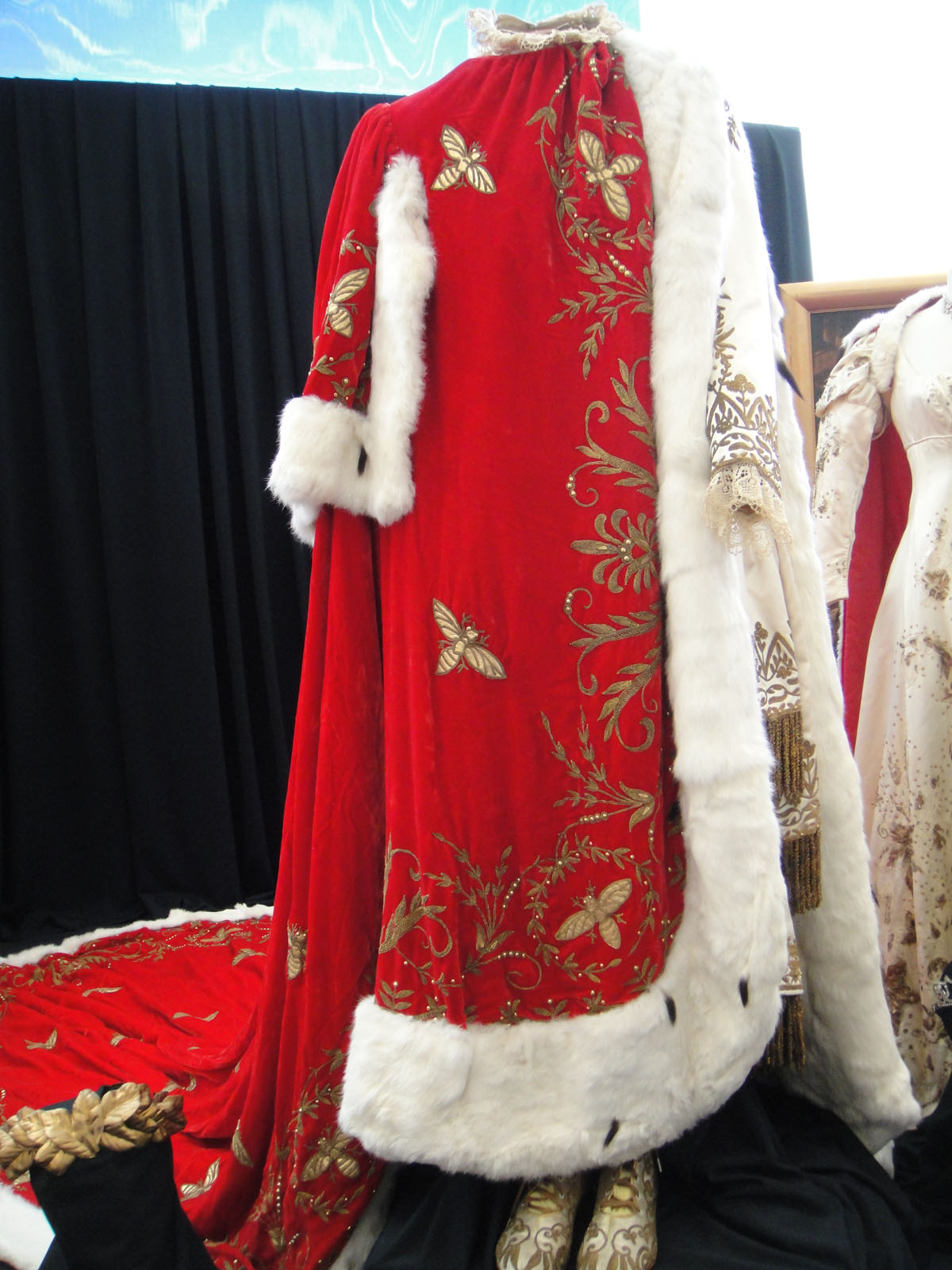
Design for Marlon Brando in Désirée (1954) - "Napoleon Bonaparte" coronation costume

René Hubert (October 7, 1895 – June, 1976) was a Swiss costume designer. He was nominated for two Academy Awards for his work on costumes.

He designed for many films from 1925 to 1964; he often designed for Gloria Swanson. Shirley Temple danced the 'Hula' in the film "Curly Top" wearing a grass skirt ensemble designed by René Hubert.

== Oscar nominations ==
- 27th Academy Awards—In the category of Best Costumes-Color. Nominated for Désirée, nomination shared with Charles LeMaire. Lost to Gate of Hell.
- 37th Academy Awards—In the category of Best Costumes-Black and White. Nominated for The Visit. Lost to The Night of the Iguana.
