= Emile Santiago =

American costume designer (1899–1995)

- Born: February 21, 1899; Bloomsburg, Pennsylvania, USA
- Died: June 23, 1995 (aged 96)
- Occupation: Costume Designer
- Years active: 1952-1958

Emile Santiago (February 21, 1899 –June 23, 1995) was an American costume designer who won an Oscar for the film The Robe in the category Best Costume design-Color during the 1953 Academy Awards, that she won along with Charles LeMaire.

== Filmography ==
- The Big Country (1958)
- Strange Lady in Town (1955)
- The Robe (1953)
- Salome (1953)
- Androcles and the Lion (1952)
