= Arlington Valles =

British-born American costume designer (1886–1970)

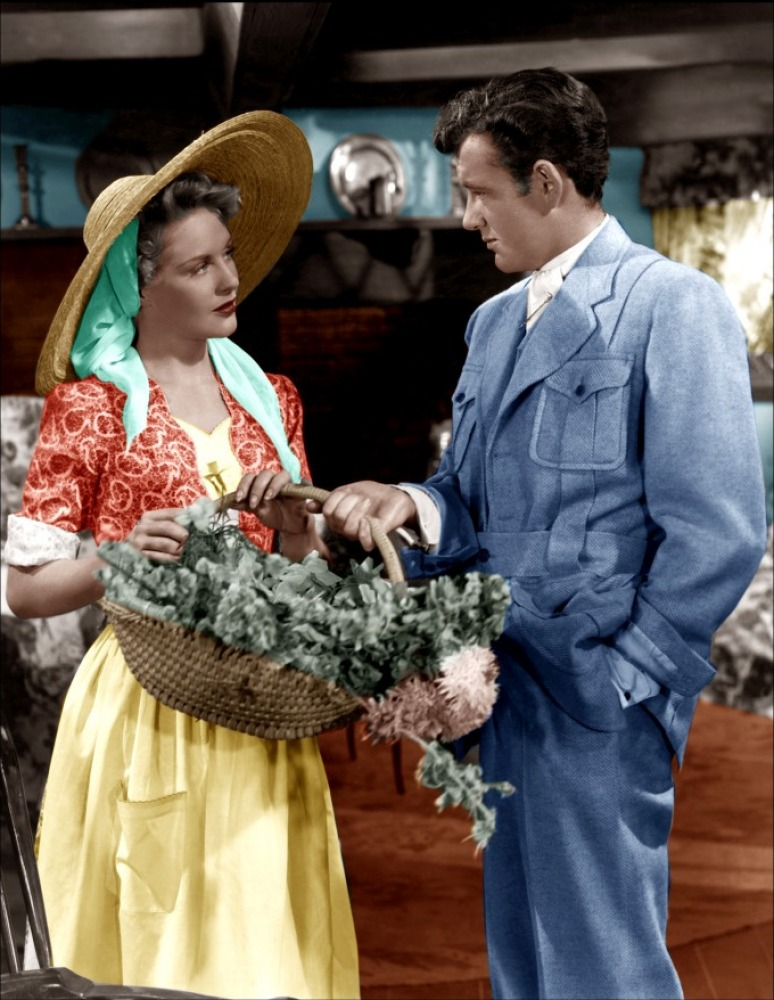
Till the Clouds Roll By 1.jpg

Fred Arlington Valles (4 May 1886 - April 1970) was a Hollywood costume designer, also professionally known as Valles and J. Arlington Valles.

Valles primarily worked at MGM, including as the head of men's wardrobe design. He first provided costumes for the 1938 version of A Christmas Carol. His work includes National Velvet (1944), Albert Lewin's The Picture of Dorian Gray (1945), The Yearling (1946) and That Forsyte Woman (1949) for which he received an Academy Award nomination in 1951.

In 1961, his costume work on Spartacus earned an Academy Award for Best Costume Design, Color, shared with Bill Thomas.

Valles died on 12 April 1970 in Los Angeles, California, aged 83.
