= Theadora Van Runkle =

American costume designer (1928–2011)

- Born: Dorothy Schweppe; March 27, 1928; Pittsburgh, Pennsylvania
- Died: November 4, 2011 (aged 83); Los Angeles
- Occupation: Costume designer
- Years active: 1967-1999
- Known for: Her influence on fashion and over-the-top costume design
- Notable work: Bullitt; Bonnie and Clyde; Troop Beverly Hills

Theadora Van Runkle (born Dorothy Schweppe; March 27, 1928 – November 4, 2011) was an American costume designer.

== Early life ==
She was born Dorothy Schweppe in Pittsburgh, Pennsylvania, as the illegitimate daughter of Courtney Bradstreet Schweppe (1885–1958), a reported member of the Schweppes beverage family, and Eltsy Adair (1909–2005). The couple did not stay together, and Eltsy moved to California while Dorothy was still an infant, and raised her on her own.

While in her twenties Dorothy began to call herself Theadora (which is the two parts of her name, Doro-thy, fancifully transposed) and became a department store fashion illustrator. For a month she worked as a sketch artist for Dorothy Jeakins, an Oscar-winning costume designer. Although she only worked for Jeakins for one month, soon after she departed, Jeakins called her and told her she had recommended her to work on Bonnie and Clyde.

== Personal life ==
She had two children with her first husband, Robert Lorimer Van Runkle, whom she divorced. Her second marriage to photographer Bruce McBroom also ended in divorce.

== Career ==
The first films for which Theadora Van Runkle designed costumes were Bonnie and Clyde (1967), The Thomas Crown Affair (1968) and The Arrangement (1969), all of which starred Faye Dunaway. Van Runkle also designed the gown Dunaway wore to the 1968 Oscars, as well as Dunaway's complete off-screen wardrobe at the time.

Van Runkle was nominated for an Oscar for three of her projects: 1967's Bonnie and Clyde, The Godfather Part II in 1974, and Peggy Sue Got Married in 1986. Although not nominated for her work on Troop Beverly Hills, in the film, the central character (played by Shelley Long) references Van Runkle by name. After being complimented on her dress, Long declares, "It's a Van Runkle, isn't it fabulous?"

In 1983, she won an Emmy Award for her work on "Wizards and Warriors," a fantasy TV series.

She was the recipient of the Costume Designer Guild's Lifetime Achievement Award in 2002.

== Fashion influence ==
Van Runkle rejected the advice of Edith Head to "do everything in chiffon" when she started her work on Bonnie and Clyde. Instead she followed her instincts to create an image of the "romantic and tragic Depression-era gangsters." At first Dunaway did not want to wear the fluid, easy to wear and pack clothing and calf-length skirts, but as soon as the movie was released "maxiskirts replaced miniskirts, the production of traditional French berets increased, and "women all around America began to search vintage stores and their grandmothers' closets for 1930s vintage pieces." Beatty's double-breasted suits, worn by his character Clyde, also brought the 1930s back in style for 1970s menswear.

A similar thing happened after Van Runkle's work on The Thomas Crown Affair and Bullit. She collaborated with Steve McQueen to create clothes that made McQueen "the king of cool." According to Bauer, "The costume design for both of these films had an immediate and lasting impact on fashion."

== Influence on actors ==
Van Runkle was able to distill the character into the costume design. According to Shelley Long, who played the leading role of Phyllis Nefler in Troop Beverly Hills, "When I put the dress on, I knew who Phyllis was, and that was perfect, and that had never happened to me before, where a costumer showed me who my character was."

== Death ==
Theadora Van Runkle died at Cedars-Sinai Medical Center in Los Angeles of lung cancer on November 4, 2011. She was survived by her son, Maxim Yorick Van Runkle, her daughter, Felicity Van Runkle, and her grandson, Michael Teo Van Runkle.

== Filmography ==
=== Film ===
- Bonnie and Clyde (1967)
- I Love You, Alice B. Toklas (1968)
- Bullitt (1968)
- A Place for Lovers (1968), credited as "Costume Designer for Miss Dunaway"'
- The Thomas Crown Affair (1968), credited as "Wardrobe Designer for Miss Dunaway"
- The Arrangement (1969)
- The Reivers (1969)
- Myra Breckinridge (1970)
- Johnny Got His Gun (1971)
- Ace Eli and Rodger of the Skies (1973)
- Kid Blue (1973)
- Mame (1974)
- The Godfather Part II (1974)
- Nickelodeon (1976)
- New York, New York (1977)
- Heaven Can Wait (1978), credited as "Costumes for Julie Christie and Dyan Cannon"
- Same Time, Next Year (1978)
- The Jerk (1979)
- Heartbeeps (1981), credited as "Costumes for Miss Peters"
- S.O.B. (1981)
- The Best Little Whorehouse in Texas (1982)
- Rhinestone (1984)
- Peggy Sue Got Married (1986)
- Wildfire (1988)
- Everybody's All-American (1988)
- Troop Beverly Hills (1989)
- Stella (1990)
- The Butcher's Wife (1991)
- Leap of Faith (1992)
- Kiss of Death (1995)
- Goodbye Lover (1998)
- I'm Losing You (1998)

=== Television ===
- Wizards and Warriors (1983)
- White Dwarf (1995)
- The Last Don (1997)
- That Championship Season (1999)
