= A Certain Smile (film) =

1958 film

- Theatrical poster
- Directed by: Jean Negulesco
- Written by: Frances Goodrich; Albert Hackett; Françoise Sagan
- Produced by: Henry Ephron
- Starring: Rossano Brazzi; Joan Fontaine
- Cinematography: Milton Krasner
- Edited by: Louis R. Loeffler
- Music by: Alfred Newman
- Distributed by: Twentieth Century-Fox
- Release date: July 31, 1958
- Running time: 104 minutes
- Country: United States
- Language: English
- Budget: $2.3 million
- Box office: $1.3 million (US rentals)

A Certain Smile is a 1958 American drama film directed by Jean Negulesco, based on the book of the same name by Françoise Sagan.

== Plot ==
In Paris, beautiful Dominique Vallon is involved with a young man, Bertrand Griot, until suddenly entering into an unwise week-long romance with his wealthy and married uncle, Luc Ferrand.

== Cast ==
- Rossano Brazzi as Luc Ferrand
- Joan Fontaine as Françoise Ferrand
- Bradford Dillman as Bertrand Griot
- Christine Carère as Dominique Vallon
- Eduard Franz as M. Vallon
- Katherine Locke as Mme. Vallon
- Kathryn Givney as Mme. Griot
- Steven Geray as Denis
- Johnny Mathis as Himself
- Trude Wyler as Mme. Denis
- Sandy Livingston as Catherine
- Renate Hoy as Mlle. Minot
- Muzaffer Tema as Pierre

== Production ==
Christine Carère was cast in the main role, although she didn't know any English at the time. She was brought to Hollywood and trained for ten months before filming. The Production Code Administration only authorized the film after substantial changes to the novel's story line. Negulesco later agreed "that A Certain Smile has not much of Sagan. She herself did not like it and she also wrote an article against it. She was right in saying that that was not her book."

== Awards and nominations ==
Award	Category	Nominee(s)	Result
Academy Awards	Best Art Direction	Art Direction: Lyle R. Wheeler and John DeCuir; Set Decoration: Walter M. Scott and Paul S. Fox	Nominated
Academy Awards	Best Costume Design	Charles LeMaire and Mary Wills	Nominated
Academy Awards	Best Song	"A Certain Smile"; Music by Sammy Fain; Lyrics by Paul Francis Webster	Nominated
Laurel Awards	Best Song	"A Certain Smile"; Music by Sammy Fain; Lyrics by Paul Francis Webster	5th Place

== Bibliography ==
- Solomon, Aubrey (1989). Twentieth Century Fox: A Corporate and Financial History. The Scarecrow Filmmakers Series. Lanham, Maryland: Scarecrow Press. ISBN 978-0-8108-4244-1.
