= Ron Talsky =

American costume designer

- Born: Ronald Albert Talsky; November 7, 1934; Los Angeles, California, U.S.
- Died: September 9, 1995 (aged 60); Los Angeles, California, U.S.
- Occupation: Costume Designer
- Years active: 1960–1996 (last film released posthumously)

Ron Talsky (November 7, 1934 – September 9, 1995) was an American costume designer who worked on both film and TV. He was known for the television show Remington Steele.

He was nominated at the 48th Academy Awards in the category of Best Costumes along with Yvonne Blake for their work on The Four Musketeers.

== Selected filmography ==
- The Alamo (1960)
- How the West was Won (1962)
- The Man Who Shot Liberty Valance (1962)
- McLintock! (1963)
- The Three Musketeers (1973)
- The Four Musketeers (1975)
- The Deep (1977)
- The Bear (1984)
- Bonanza: The Return (1993)
- Bonanza: Under Attack (1995)
