= Joe I. Tompkins =

American costume designer

- Occupation: Costume designer

Joe I. Tompkins is an American costume designer. He was nominated for two Academy Awards in the category Best Costume Design for the films Cross Creek and Harlem Nights.

== Selected filmography ==
- Cross Creek (1983)
- Harlem Nights (1989)
