= Marik Vos-Lundh =

Swedish costume, production and set designer (1923–1994)

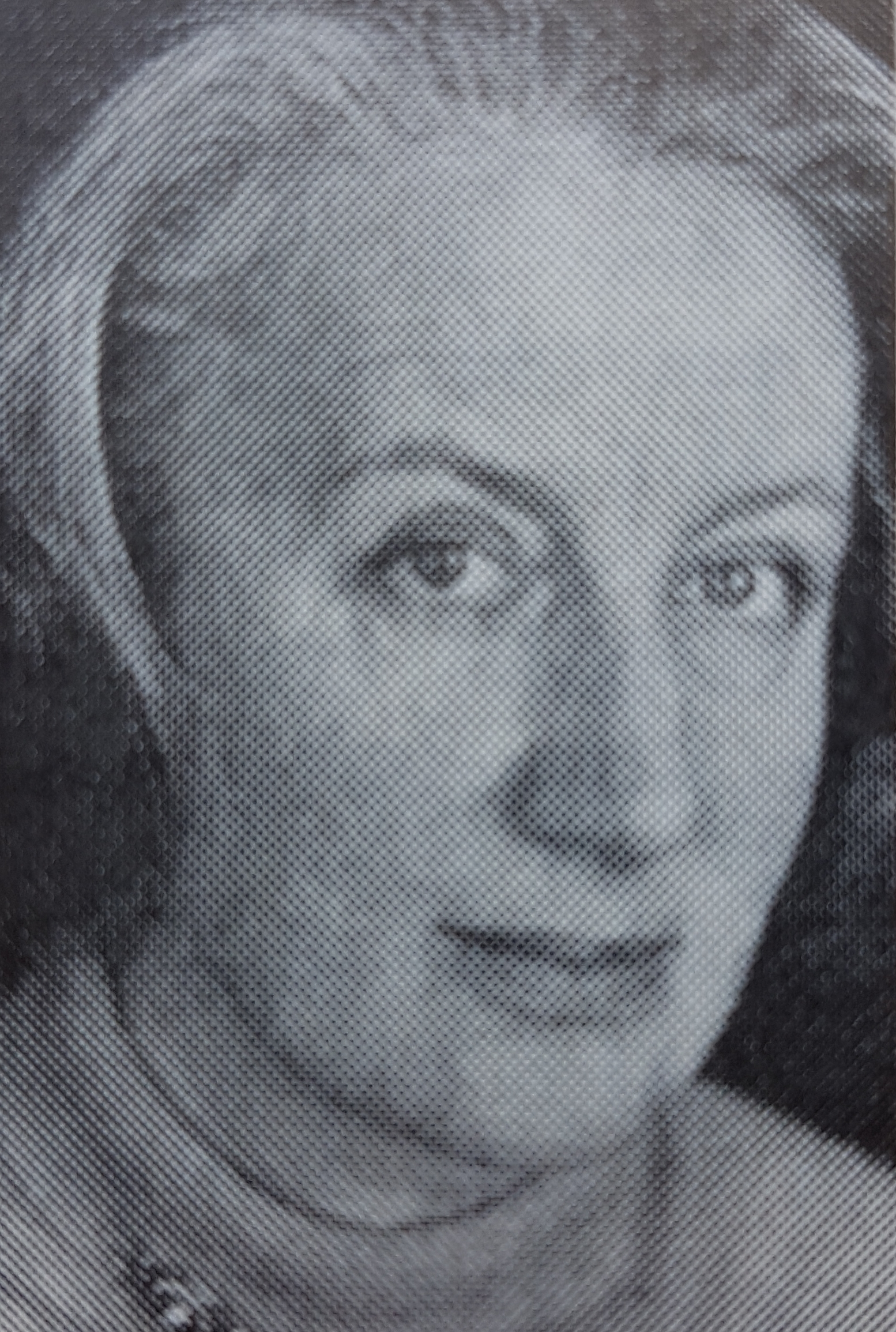
- Born: Marie-Anne Ericsson; June 3, 1923; Petrograd, Russian SFSR, Soviet Union
- Died: July 13, 1994 (aged 71); Gotland, Sweden
- Other name: Marik Vos
- Occupations: Costume designer; production designer; scenic designer
- Years active: 1946–1982
- Spouses: Bengt Olof Vos (m. 1947; div. 1959); Börje Lundh (m. 1962; died 1972)

Marie-Anne "Marik" Vos-Lundh (née Ericsson; 3 June 1923 – 13 July 1994) was a Swedish costume designer, production designer, and set designer, best known for her frequent collaborations with director Ingmar Bergman. She has been nominated for the Academy Award for Best Costume Design three times for her work on Bergman's films, winning for Fanny and Alexander (1982).

== Early life and education ==
Vos-Lundh was born on June 3, 1923, in Petrograd, Russian SFSR, Soviet Union, to a Russian mother and a Swedish father. In 1932, her family emigrated to Sweden. At the age of twelve, she decided to become a set designer after being fully captivated by theater since her childhood. In spite of the 1940s' lack of professional training in scenic design, she pursued courses that she believed would improve her crafting skills. She enrolled at the Konstfack, University of Arts, Crafts and Design in 1939 to study decorative painting, perspective theory, and watercolor; she graduated in 1943. Between 1942 and 1944, she also attended the Otte Skölds School of Painting and worked at the Royal Dramatic Theatre (a.k.a. Dramaten) to immerse herself in scenography.

== Career ==
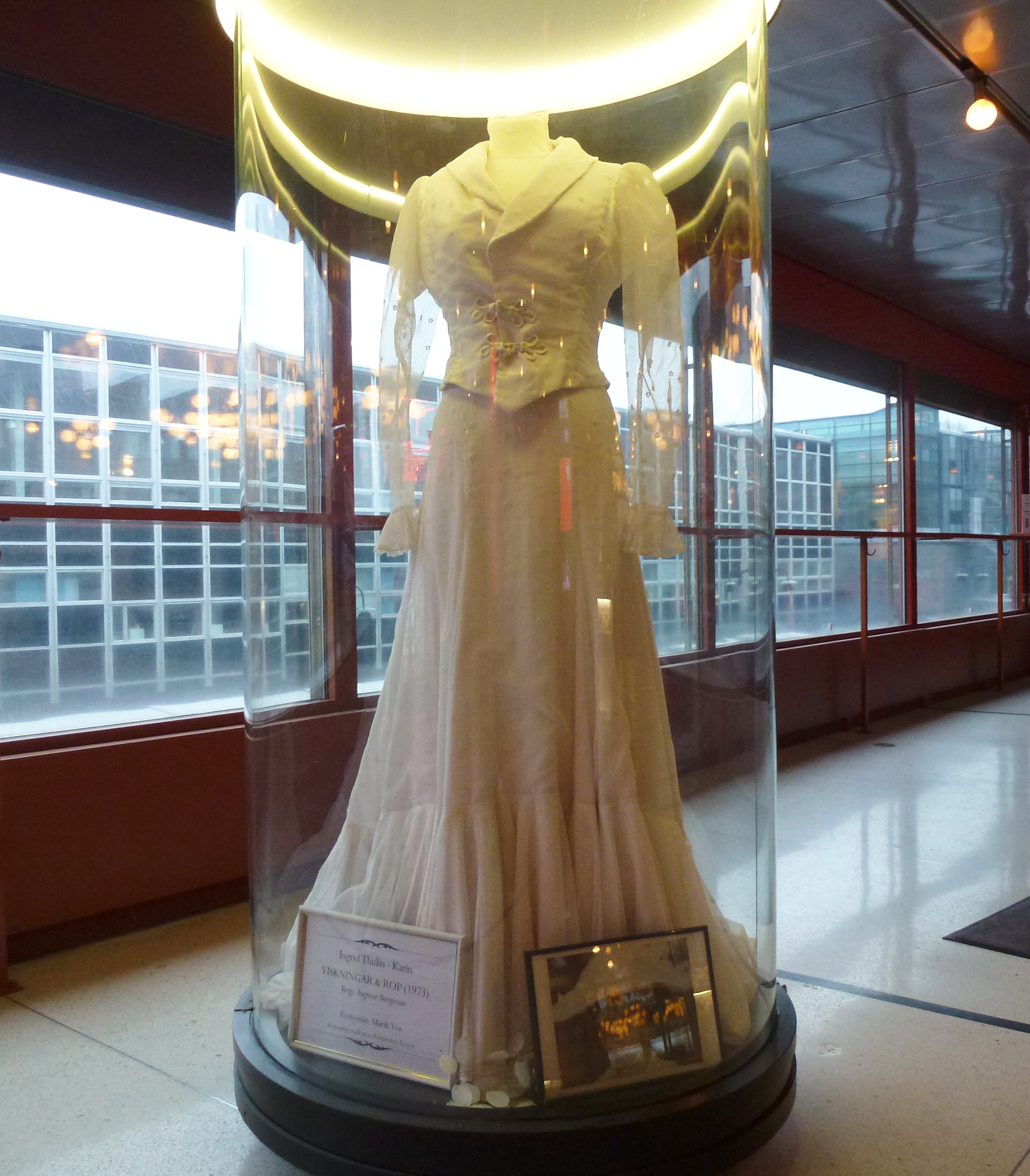
White dresses worn by Ingrid Thulin in Cries and Whispers, designed by Vos-Lundh. White gowns contrasted against a crimson red background was a key color motif in the film.

Vos-Lundh began her professional career in 1944 when she joined the Dramaten, a faithful commitment that lasted for 40 years. Her first major theater credit came with creating the sets for Olof Molander's 1946 production of Anton Chekhov's The Cherry Orchard. Throughout the subsequent years, she alternated between designing the sets and costumes for over 120 different stage productions. Eventually, she was appointed the Dramaten's decoration manager in 1963 and its production manager in the following year.

Vos-Lundh collaborated with many renowned directors throughout her distinguished theater career, including Alf Sjöberg, Mimi Pollak, Rune Carlsten, Bengt Ekerot, Per-Axel Branner, and Ingmar Bergman, among others. Their long-lasting professional collaboration with Bergman in particular has brought her craftsmanship to the attention of the global audience. It all started on Dramaten's stage when she was tasked with providing the costumes and set design for the director's 1961 production of Chekhov's The Seagull.

Despite enjoying a celebrated theatre career, perhaps Vos-Lundh's most memorable work which brought her international recognition may well have been her various contributions on some of the most critically acclaimed Bergman films. She became the first Swedish designer to receive an Academy Award for creating the costumes on medieval-set drama, The Virgin Spring (1960). Vos-Lundh continued to work with the director on The Silence (1963) and Hour of the Wolf (1968), the latter being her first film effort in production rather than costume design.

Over the course of the pair's well-established creative partnership, Vos-Lundh and Bergman have developed a similar view on utilizing the color scheme in costuming and art direction as a cinematic technique that affects the film's perception or even determines its themes. This premise has been successfully implemented in the period chamber drama, Cries and Whispers (1972). She was responsible for designing the crimson-blood interiors as well as the contrasting white and black turn-of-the-century gowns. Vos-Lundh's impeccable work on the film's aesthetic became instantly recognizable and earned her another Oscar nomination for costume design.

Vos-Lundh and Bergman reunited again about a decade later for his semi-autobiographical family saga, Fanny and Alexander (1982). Working on that highly ambitious and deeply personal director's project, which turned out to be the biggest challenge of her own illustrious career, she was charged with designing a total of 250 costumes for the principal actors, along with over 1000 outfits for the extras. During the pre-production, Bergman instructed her to imagine the world through the children's eyes; therefore, she allowed herself some artistic liberties not necessarily loyal to period-typical wardrobes and created the film's magical reality instead of replicating more authentic clothes. Vos-Lundh received high praise for her immaculate work, along with winning the Academy Award for Best Costume Design. She became just the second Swedish designer to win in the category. In 1984, Vos-Lundh detailed her experiences making costumes for the film in the book Dräkterna i dramat: mitt år med Fanny och Alexander.

== Other ventures ==
Besides her acclaimed professional work on stage and screen, Vos-Lundh was known for her community activism. She was elected a member of the Nya Idun, a Swedish women's cultural association, in 1960, and she served as the society's chairman from 1977 to 1980.

In the 1980s, after leaving Stockholm to settle down in Vamlingbo, she became involved in Suderlamm, a local environmental protection project that included wool production and created further job opportunities for women. Among other activities, she also participated in her community's religious life, serving as a churchwarden at Vamlingbo Church.

== Selected film credits ==
Year	Title	Director	Credited as		Notes
Year	Title	Director	Costume Designer	Production Designer	Notes
1960	The Virgin Spring	Ingmar Bergman	Yes	No	
1962	Adventures of Nils Holgersson	Kenne Fant	Yes	No	
1963	The Silence	Ingmar Bergman	Yes	No	
1968	Hour of the Wolf	Ingmar Bergman	No	Yes	
1972	Cries and Whispers	Ingmar Bergman	Yes	Yes	
1982	Fanny and Alexander	Ingmar Bergman	Yes	No	Also released in a longer television version

== Awards and nominations ==
Award	Year (Note: Indicates the year of ceremony. Each year is linked to the article about the awards held that year, wherever possible.)	Category	Work	Result	Ref.
Academy Awards	1961	Best Costume Design – Black and White	The Virgin Spring	Nominated	
Academy Awards	1974	Best Costume Design	Cries and Whispers	Nominated	
Academy Awards	1984	Best Costume Design	Fanny and Alexander	Won	
British Academy Film Awards	1984	Best Costume Design	Fanny and Alexander	Nominated	
