= Patricia Norris =

American costume and production designer (1931–2015)

- Born: March 22, 1931; Los Angeles, California, U.S.
- Died: February 20, 2015 (aged 83); Westlake Village, California, U.S.
- Occupations: Costume designer; production designer
- Children: 4

Patricia Norris (March 22, 1931 – February 20, 2015) was an American costume designer and production designer. She has received various accolades, including a Costume Designers Guild Award and an Emmy Award, in addition to nominations for six Academy Awards.

== Career ==
Norris's first credit as costume designer was for The Late Liz (1971). She went on to design costumes for several iconic films of the 1970s and 1980s, including Capricorn One (1977), Days of Heaven (1978), Victor/Victoria (1982) and Scarface (1983). In 1980, she designed the costumes for The Elephant Man, the first of many collaborations with director David Lynch. For her next project with Lynch, Blue Velvet, she received her first credit as production designer, taking responsibility for the entirety of the film's decor, not just the costumes. Norris continued to work on all of Lynch's films, up to The Straight Story (1999). In later years, Norris collaborated with Plan B Entertainment on The Assassination of Jesse James by the Coward Robert Ford (2007), Killing Them Softly (2012), and 12 Years a Slave (2013).

== Awards ==
She was nominated six times for the Academy Award for Best Costume Design: for Days of Heaven, The Elephant Man, Victor/Victoria, 2010: The Year We Make Contact, Sunset and 12 Years a Slave. She won the Primetime Emmy Award for Outstanding Costumes for a Series and was nominated for the Primetime Emmy Award for Outstanding Art Direction for a Single-Camera Series for Twin Peaks (Episode: Pilot). She also won the Costume Designers Guild Award for Excellence in Period Film for 12 Years a Slave.

In 2010, she received a Lifetime Achievement Award from the Art Directors Guild. She was the only person to receive Lifetime Achievement Awards from both the Costume Designers Guild and the Art Directors Guild.
