= Heart Like a Wheel (film) =

1983 film by Jonathan Kaplan

- Directed by: Jonathan Kaplan
- Written by: Ken Friedman; David E. Peckinpah
- Produced by: Lamar Card; Marty Katz; Charles Roven; Arne Schmidt; Michael Nolin (produced in association with)
- Starring: Bonnie Bedelia; Beau Bridges
- Cinematography: Tak Fujimoto
- Edited by: O. Nicholas Brown
- Music by: Laurence Rosenthal
- Production company: Aurora Productions
- Distributed by: 20th Century Fox
- Release date: April 1, 1983
- Running time: 113 minutes
- Country: United States
- Language: English
- Budget: $7.5 million
- Box office: $272,278

Heart Like a Wheel is a 1983 American biographical drama sports film directed by Jonathan Kaplan and based on the life of drag racing driver Shirley Muldowney. It stars Bonnie Bedelia as Shirley Muldowney and Beau Bridges as drag racing driver Connie Kalitta.

The film garnered two award nominations: Bedelia for a Golden Globe Award for Best Actress - Motion Picture Drama, and William Theiss for an Oscar for Best Costume Design.

== Plot ==
In 1956, Schenectady, New York, waitress Shirley Roque marries auto mechanic Jack Muldowney over the mild objections of her singer father Tex, who wants her to be self-sufficient rather than having to rely on a husband. Jack buys a gas station, Shirley becomes a housewife, and they have a son.

For fun, Jack races his hot rod against others on deserted stretches of road late at night. One time, Shirley talks him into letting her drive. She wins and continues winning. A chance encounter with professional driver "Big Daddy" Don Garlits inspires her to look for sponsorship from one of the major car manufacturers, despite her husband's skepticism. As this is the late 1950s, a pretty housewife is not taken seriously, especially since no women are professional drivers, but when she returns home, Jack tells her that he can build her a dragster.

In 1966, she is ready. She still needs to get three signatures before she can get her National Hot Rod Association (NHRA) license, nearly impossible in the macho racing world. Finally, Garlits (seeing an opportunity to broaden the sport's popularity) signs, followed by funny car driver Connie Kalitta, who has his own reasons; Connie talks a reluctant third driver into going along. In her first attempt to qualify for a race, she sets a track record. Later, during a dinner with their respective spouses, Connie gets her alone, makes a pass at her, and she slaps him in the face.

Shirley becomes successful, racing on weekends, but when Connie decides to move up to Top Fuel dragsters, she wants to buy his funny car and compete year-round. This exhausts Jack's tolerance for Shirley's racing activity, as he feels neglected, and they separate.

Connie and Shirley become involved romantically, despite his continual philandering. In a 1973 race, Shirley's funny car is destroyed, and she is seriously burned. When Connie is suspended indefinitely by the NHRA for fighting on her behalf, she tells him that she is going to Top Fuel. He becomes her crew chief. She wins her first NHRA national event in 1976, then the World Championship in 1977. Finally, tired of Connie's womanizing, she drops him from her team. Angry, he successfully pursues reinstatement by the NHRA.

Shirley, with little sponsorship and an inexperienced crew, has two lean years, but she rebounds in 1980. She races against Connie in that year's NHRA championship final. She is victorious, and they reconcile. Jack, her ex-husband (who had watched the victory on TV), gives her a private cheer.

== Cast ==
- Bonnie Bedelia as Shirley Muldowney
- Beau Bridges as Connie Kalitta
- Leo Rossi as Jack Muldowney
- Hoyt Axton as "Tex" Roque
- Bill McKinney as "Big Daddy" Don Garlits
- Anthony Edwards as John Muldowney, Shirley and Jack's Son
- Tiffany Brissette as Little Shirley
- Ellen Geer as Marianne Kalitta, Connie's Wife
- Tom Duffield as Rahn Tobler

The film also marked the film debut of character actor Leonard Termo, who had a small role as Good Joe.

== Reception ==
Rolling Stone's Michael Sragow gave Heart Like a Wheel a mostly positive review, deeming it "flawed but energetic". He remarked that compared to other film biographies, the storyline and depiction of the core subject matter (drag racing) are lacking in drama and clarity, but in part because of that, are much more true to life. For this reason, he felt that drag racing enthusiasts would get more out of the film than those unfamiliar with the sport. He praised the acting as the movie's strongest point, particularly the performances by Bedelia and Bridges. Audiences polled by CinemaScore gave the film an average grade of "B+" on an A+ to F scale.

=== Muldowney's reaction ===
Muldowney would rather have had Jamie Lee Curtis play her; she called Bedelia "a snot", and stated, "When she was promoting the movie on TV shows, she would tell interviewers she didn't even like racing. She got out of [sic] race car like she was getting up from the dinner table." Although Muldowney acted as creative consultant on the production, she has mixed feelings about the film itself, stating, "No, the movie did not capture my life very well at all, but more importantly, I thought the movie was very, very good for the sport."

== Accolades ==
The film was nominated for the American Film Institute's 2008 AFI's 10 Top 10 list in the sports film category.

== Legacy ==
A loose racing video game adaptation of the film was developed by Micro Computer Technologies for the Atari 2600, but publisher Fox Video Games cancelled its release due to the film's presumed poor box-office performance. It was programmed by Jim Collas, who later joined Gateway 2000 and led its Amiga subsidiary until 1999 after acquiring the brand. A surviving prototype exists without any identifiable information outside from its publisher, leading it to be unidentified until its existence was confirmed by Collas years after its release.
