= Donfeld =

American costume designer (1934–2007)

- Born: Donald Lee Feld; July 3, 1934; Los Angeles, California, U.S.
- Died: February 3, 2007 (aged 72); Temple City, California, U.S.
- Other name: Don Feld
- Education: Chouinard Art Institute
- Occupation: Costume designer
- Years active: 1961–1993

Donfeld (born Donald Lee Feld; July 3, 1934 – February 3, 2007) was a four-time Oscar-nominated American costume designer known for his work on films such as Spaceballs, Prizzi's Honor and The Great Race.

In addition, he made the costumes for the action adventure fantasy television series Wonder Woman, for which he was nominated for an Emmy Award in 1978.

Donfeld attended Chouinard Art Institute before he went to work for Capitol Records at age 19, designing album cover art. He stated he changed his name early in his career, because his last name was often misspelled in print. One of his first Hollywood assignments in the late 1950s, was to create costumes for Academy Award show production numbers.

Along with his costume work, he was known for his draftsman’s skills. One colleague stated "His costume sketches are works of art.”

== Oscar nominations ==
All four nominations were in the category of Best Costumes.

- 35th Academy Awards-Nominated for Days of Wine and Roses (for B/W costumes). Lost to What Ever Happened to Baby Jane?.
- 42nd Academy Awards-Nominated for They Shoot Horses, Don't They?. Lost to Anne of the Thousand Days.
- 46th Academy Awards-Nominated for Tom Sawyer. Lost to The Sting.
- 58th Academy Awards-Nominated for Prizzi's Honor. Lost to Ran.

== Selected filmography ==
- Days of Wine and Roses (1962)
- Mr. Hobbs Takes a Vacation (1962)
- Robin and the 7 Hoods (1964)
- The Great Race (1965)
- They Shoot Horses, Don't They? (1969)
- The April Fools (1969)
- Diamonds Are Forever (1971), costumes of "Tiffany Case" (Jill St. John)
- Tom Sawyer (1973)
- Huckleberry Finn (1974)
- The China Syndrome (1979)
- Prizzi's Honor (1985)
- Spaceballs (1987)
- Father Hood (1993)

== Television work ==
Costume designer for Herb Alpert & The Tijuana Brass TV Specials, "Wonder Woman", "The Beat of the Brass", and "Singer Presents"
