= The Four Musketeers (1974 film) =

- Theatrical poster
- Directed by: Richard Lester
- Written by: George MacDonald Fraser
- Based on: The Three Musketeers; 1844 novel by Alexandre Dumas père
- Produced by: Alexander Salkind; Ilya Salkind; Michael Salkind
- Starring: Oliver Reed; Raquel Welch; Richard Chamberlain; Michael York; Frank Finlay; Christopher Lee; Geraldine Chaplin; Jean-Pierre Cassel; Simon Ward; Faye Dunaway; Charlton Heston
- Cinematography: David Watkin
- Edited by: John Victor Smith
- Music by: Lalo Schifrin
- Production companies: Film Trust S.A. Este Films
- Distributed by: Fox-Rank
- Release dates: 31 October 1974 (West Germany); 1 September 1975 (United Kingdom)
- Running time: 108 minutes
- Country: United Kingdom
- Language: English
- Box office: $8,760,000 (US/ Canada)

The Four Musketeers (also known as The Four Musketeers: The Revenge of Milady) is a 1974 British swashbuckler film and sequel to the 1973 film The Three Musketeers, covering the second half of Dumas' 1844 novel The Three Musketeers.

Fifteen years after completion of The Four Musketeers, much of the cast and crew reassembled to film The Return of the Musketeers (1989), loosely based on Dumas' Twenty Years After (1845).

== Plot ==
During the Anglo-French War (1627–29), which involved suppression of the Protestant rebels of La Rochelle, Cardinal Richelieu continues the machinations he began in The Three Musketeers by ordering the Count de Rochefort to kidnap Constance Bonacieux, dressmaker to Queen Anne of France. The evil Milady de Winter, who wants revenge on junior musketeer d'Artagnan, seduces him to keep him occupied. He soon discovers her true nature, however, and also that she was once married to his fellow musketeer Athos, who had supposedly killed her after discovering that she was a branded criminal.

The trio of musketeers — Athos, Porthos, and Aramis — rescue Constance from imprisonment in Rochefort's abode of Saint Cloud and take her to safety in the convent of Armentières. De Winter sends d'Artagnan poisoned wine and a note intended to trick him into thinking that the trio have been imprisoned for drunkenness. On his way to bail them out, d'Artagnan is attacked by Rochefort and his men. The trio join the fight, and Rochefort flees. One of his men is captured and tortured for information, revealing that Richelieu is going to the Dovecote Inn near La Rochelle, but then drinks the poisoned wine and dies, revealing de Winter's trap. The trio then proceed to the inn where they spy on Richelieu. The Cardinal orders de Winter to threaten the Duke of Buckingham with exposure of his affair with the Queen, to discourage him from sending a relief force to aid the rebels; she is to kill the Duke if he does not comply. In return, de Winter asks for a warrant, so she can kill d'Artagnan and Constance. Richelieu reluctantly signs one, wording it in a way that leaves no evidence against himself: "By my order and for the good of the state, the bearer has done what has been done."

After revealing himself to de Winter, Athos takes the death warrant from her and later tells d'Artagnan of the plot. D'Artagnan sends his servant Planchet to warn the Duke. In England, de Winter asks Buckingham not to help the rebels, but he refuses. De Winter tries to assassinate him, but she is captured. Buckingham has his servant John Felton lock her away in the Tower of London, but she seduces Felton and convinces him that Buckingham is his enemy. Felton helps her to escape and return to France, then murders Buckingham before Planchet can warn him. Soon after, La Rochelle surrenders.

Rochefort and de Winter are still intent on killing d'Artagnan and Constance. With a force of guards, they occupy the convent at Armentières and battle all four musketeers when they arrive. While Rochefort and his men hold the musketeers at bay, de Winter strangles Constance. Athos captures de Winter; D'Artagnan duels Rochefort and apparently kills him with a lunge through the chest (though it is revealed in the sequel The Return of the Musketeers that he actually survived the wound). The four musketeers sentence de Winter to death by beheading, and they hire an executioner to carry out the punishment. Afterward, they are arrested by the Cardinal's guards.

Richelieu charges d'Artagnan with murder for killing a valuable servant of the State, but d'Artagnan shows him the signed death warrant which, due to its ambiguous phrasing, appears to authorize d'Artagnan's actions. Defeated and quite impressed at d'Artagnan's achievement, the Cardinal offers him a commission for either him or one of his three friends to become an officer. Athos, Porthos, and Aramis all reject it, and d'Artagnan is promoted to Lieutenant of the Musketeers.

== Cast ==
- Oliver Reed as Athos
- Raquel Welch as Constance Bonacieux
- Richard Chamberlain as Aramis
- Michael York as d'Artagnan
- Frank Finlay as Porthos
- Christopher Lee as the Count de Rochefort
- Geraldine Chaplin as Anne of Austria
- Jean-Pierre Cassel as Louis XIII
- Roy Kinnear as Planchet
- Michael Gothard as Felton
- Nicole Calfan as Kitty
- Ángel del Pozo as Jussac
- Eduardo Fajardo as General
- Simon Ward as the Duke of Buckingham
- Faye Dunaway as Milady de Winter
- Charlton Heston as Cardinal Richelieu
- Sybil Danning as Eugenie
- Gitty Djamal as Beatrice
- Jack Watson as Busigny
- Bob Todd as Firing Squad Officer
- Leon Greene as Swiss Officer
- Norman Chappell as Submarine inventor

== Production ==
During production on The Three Musketeers, the producers realized that the project was too lengthy to complete as intended — as a roadshow epic with intermission — and still achieve their announced release date. They split the project into two films, released as The Three Musketeers and The Four Musketeers six months apart. The actors were angry that their work was being used to make a separate film, while they were only being paid for one. Lawsuits were filed to gain the salaries and benefits associated with a second film that was not mentioned in the original contracts. All SAG actors' contracts now have what is known as the "Salkind clause", which stipulates how many films are being made.

== Reception and awards ==
The film received mostly positive reviews. On the review aggregator website Rotten Tomatoes, 75% of 28 critics' reviews are positive.

It was also nominated at the 48th Academy Awards for Best Costumes (Yvonne Blake and Ron Talsky).

== Releases ==
The original negatives by StudioCanal were used to master The Criterion Collection's new 4K Blu-ray restoration, although Criterion chose to retain the mono soundtrack, rather than a multi-channel remix.
