= Seven Thieves =

1960 film by Henry Hathaway

- Film poster
- Directed by: Henry Hathaway
- Screenplay by: Sydney Boehm
- Based on: The Lions at the Kill; 1959 novel by Max Catto
- Produced by: Sydney Boehm
- Starring: Edward G. Robinson; Rod Steiger; Joan Collins; Eli Wallach
- Cinematography: Sam Leavitt
- Edited by: Dorothy Spencer
- Music by: Dominic Frontiere
- Distributed by: Twentieth Century Fox Film Corporation
- Release date: March 12, 1960 (New York City)
- Running time: 102 min
- Language: English/French
- Budget: $1,650,000

Seven Thieves is a 1960 American heist crime drama film shot in CinemaScope. It stars Edward G. Robinson, Rod Steiger, Joan Collins and Eli Wallach.

Directed by Henry Hathaway and produced by Sydney Boehm, it was adapted for the screen by Sydney Boehm, based on the 1959 novel The Lions At The Kill by Max Catto. Technical advisor was Candy Barr, who, as choreographer, taught dance routines to Collins.

Seven Thieves received an Academy Award nomination for Best Costume Design Black-and-White (Bill Thomas).

== Plot ==
A discredited expatriate American professor, Theo Wilkins, has called on a young protégé and sophisticated thief, Paul Mason, to come over from the US to the south of France and help him pull off one final heist. He has masterminded a caper to steal $4,000,000 in French francs from the underground vault of the casino of Monte Carlo, Monaco. Wilkins has recruited a team of thieves – including Melanie, an exotic dancer – but he needs someone he can trust, Mason, to keep them all in line during the crime.

The heist takes place on the night of a grand celebration at the casino. Melanie's protector, the saxophone player Pancho, and Wilkins enter the casino in the guises of (respectively) "Baron von Roelitz," an aristocrat with a disability who uses a wheelchair, and his physician, "Dr. Vidal." At the same time, Melanie, the safecracker Louis and Mason attend the party with invitations procured by the gang's inside man at the casino, the meek assistant to the director, Le May, who is under Melanie's spell.

Mason and Louis step out on a ledge through a window which Melanie has opened for them and then closed behind them, and make their way along the narrow ledge high above the sea to the casino director's office. From there, they descend by elevator to the vault four floors below. They cut through a barred gate in front of the vault and drill through the lock, secure the cash and make their way back to the director's elevator.

Pancho's part of the plan is to ingest a cyanide capsule to simulate a heart attack. Afraid, he fails to do so, necessitating that Wilkins inject him with cyanide instead. Pancho collapses and Wilkins maneuvers the casino director, in the name of "discretion," into transporting "the baron" to his office. Here, Wilkins pretends to phone for an ambulance, and informs the director that the baron is dead. They leave the office with the inert baron in it.

Immediately re-entering the director's office, Louis and Mason stash the money in the hollow seat of the baron's wheelchair. They then return along the ledge to the window into the casino, which Melanie has reopened for them, narrowly avoiding being caught by casino security. Louis and Melanie depart the party together, while Mason makes his way out separately.

The "ambulance" summoned by Wilkins is in reality part of the plan, and is driven by the last accomplice, Fritz. Pancho is strapped into the wheelchair, taken to the side entrance of the casino and loaded into the ambulance. The conspirators then make their getaway. Just as Pancho is regaining consciousness in the back of the ambulance, Wilkins, smiling in the excitement of his success, peacefully and unexpectedly dies. Mason and Melanie drive him back to his hotel. While driving back to the hideout, Mason breaks down and Melanie realizes that Wilkins was his father.

Mason and Melanie decide they want no part of the stolen money. They return to the hideout, where the others are squabbling over how to split the take. Mason examines the money and discovers that it is brand new currency and that all the serial numbers are on file with the Bank of France, which will make it next to impossible to spend. Mason and Melanie, realizing that the others will be unable to resist spending the cash, will be caught and will implicate them, forcibly take the cash away and return it to the casino. Ironically, while returning the money they hit it big on the roulette table. Thus the two of them, who by now have decided to take their chances in life together, emerge as the only members of the gang to come out ahead.

== Cast ==
- Edward G. Robinson – Professor Theo Wilkins
- Rod Steiger – Paul Mason
- Joan Collins – Melanie
- Eli Wallach – Pancho
- Alexander Scourby – Raymond Le May
- Michael Dante – Louis Antonizzi
- Berry Kroeger – Hugo Baumer aka Fritz
- Sebastian Cabot – Director of Casino

== Production ==
Hathaway wanted to cast Dean Martin and William Powell but was unable to. Instead he was given Rod Steiger "who was hot at the time" but who Hathaway says "was too heavy, too intense." According to the director, Steiger refused to take direction for the first few days and Hathaway threatened to leave. After Steiger and studio head Buddy Adler watched the rushes, Steiger agreed to take direction and the first few days were reshot.
