= Herschel McCoy =

American motion picture costume designer

- Born: Herschel Denman McCoy; August 6, 1912; Wiggins, Mississippi, U.S.
- Died: February 3, 1956 (aged 43); Los Angeles, California, U.S.
- Occupation: costume designer
- Years active: 1936–1955

Herschel McCoy (August 6, 1912 – February 3, 1956) was an American motion picture costume designer with credits on more than 150 feature films from 1936 to 1955. He was nominated twice for the Academy Award for Best Costume Design.

McCoy's early efforts were largely focused on B movies, such as several entries in the Charlie Chan and Mr. Moto canons. He had just graduated to major studio productions like an uncredited assist on Joan of Arc (1948), Quo Vadis (1951), and Dream Wife (1953) when he died suddenly in 1956 at the age of 43. For the last two films, McCoy was nominated for the Academy Award for Best Costume Design.

McCoy's drawings for twenty-two of his designs are in the collection of the Los Angeles County Museum of Art.
