= Morton Haack =

American costume designer (1924–1987)

- Born: June 26, 1924; Los Angeles, California, USA
- Died: March 22, 1987 (aged 62); Rome, Italy
- Occupation: Costume Designer
- Years active: 1958-1973

Morton Haack (June 26, 1924 – March 22, 1987) was an American costume designer who was perhaps best known for his work on the original Planet of the Apes.

== Academy Award nominations ==
Year	Category	Nominated work	Result	Ref.
1964	Best Costume Design — Color	The Unsinkable Molly Brown	Nominated	
1968	Best Costume Design	Planet of the Apes	Nominated	
1971	Best Costume Design	What's the Matter with Helen?	Nominated	

== Filmography ==
- Massacre in Rome (1973) (production designer)
- What's the Matter with Helen? (1971)
- Beneath the Planet of the Apes (1970)
- Buona Sera, Mrs. Campbell (1968)
- Planet of the Apes (1968)
- Games (1967)
- Walk Don't Run (1966)
- The Unsinkable Molly Brown (1964)
- Billy Rose's Jumbo (1962)
- Come September (1961)
- Please Don't Eat the Daisies (1960)
- Money, Women and Guns (1958)
- Wild Heritage (1958)
