= William Ware Theiss =

American costume designer

- Born: November 20, 1931; Medford, Massachusetts, US
- Died: December 15, 1992 (aged 61); Los Angeles, California, US
- Education: Stanford University (BA)
- Occupation: Costume designer
- Years active: 1960–1988

William Ware Theiss (/θaɪs/; November 20, 1931 – December 15, 1992) was an American costume designer for television and film.

His film credits as costume designer include Spartacus, Harold and Maude, Bound for Glory, Pete's Dragon (uncredited), Who'll Stop the Rain, Butch and Sundance: The Early Days, The Man with One Red Shoe, and Heart Like a Wheel. His television credits include Star Trek and Star Trek: The Next Generation, for which he won an Emmy Award for Best Costume Design.

In the course of his career, Theiss was most famous for creating alluring female costuming that censors typically could not credibly forbid, employing what came to be called the "Theiss Titillation Theory": "The sexiness of an outfit is directly proportional to the perceived possibility that a vital piece of it might fall off."

== Early life ==
Theiss was born in Medford, Massachusetts, the son of Harold Hetherington Theiss and Helen Theiss, and was named for his paternal great-grandfather, William Hodgson, and his paternal great-grandmother's family, Ellen (Ware) Hodgson. He attended Lowell High School in San Francisco. He attended Art Center College of Design at Stanford University, graduating with a Bachelor of Arts, minoring in sciences, biology and chemistry before a four-year stint in the United States Navy. He eventually moved to Los Angeles. His first Hollywood job was as a personal secretary to Cary Grant, whose ex-wife, actress Dyan Cannon, Theiss cited as having considerable influence on his career.

== Career ==
Following six months at Revue/Universal Studios as an apprentice artist in the Advertising Art Department, Theiss worked at CBS in the Wardrobe Department on two televised soap operas. The film The Pink Panther (1963) was his first as a designer, although he is credited as "wardrobe consultant". He returned to television as a wardrobe man for shows including Hollywood Palace, My Favorite Martian, and The Farmer's Daughter. In the fall of 1964, he was costume designer for "The World of Ray Bradbury" on stage.

In 1964, he was brought to the attention of Gene Roddenberry by his friend D. C. Fontana. Roddenberry then hired Theiss as costume designer for Star Trek. The "Theiss Titillation Theory"—which claims that "the degree to which a costume is considered sexy is directly proportional to how accident-prone it appears to be"—is named after him. A key example of this idea in practice is the female android costume in the Star Trek episode "What Are Little Girls Made Of?" in which the revealing top portion consists only of two crossing straps of material that connect in one piece to trousers, and—Theiss's personal favorite—the pink gown featured in the episode "Who Mourns for Adonais?": a backless dress in which the front of the dress was held up by the weight of the train which fell over the shoulder to the floor.

In the 1970s and early 1980s, he designed costumes for at least a dozen TV movies, including Genesis II and The B.R.A.T. Patrol, as well as for over a dozen motion pictures, including three Academy Award for Best Costume Design nominations for 1976's Bound for Glory, 1979's Butch and Sundance: The Early Days, and 1983's Heart Like a Wheel. His final credit was as costume designer for Star Trek: The Next Generation, for which he won an Emmy Award for Outstanding Costume Design for a Series for the episode "The Big Goodbye".

== Illness and death ==
Theiss died of complications from AIDS on December 15, 1992, age 61.
