= That Forsyte Woman =

1949 film by Compton Bennett

- 1949 theatrical poster
- Directed by: Compton Bennett
- Written by: Jan Lustig; Ivan Tors; James B. Williams; Arthur Wimperis (additional dialogue)
- Based on: The Man of Property; 1906 novel by John Galsworthy
- Produced by: Leon Gordon
- Starring: Errol Flynn; Greer Garson; Walter Pidgeon; Robert Young; Janet Leigh
- Cinematography: Joseph Ruttenberg
- Edited by: Frederick Y. Smith
- Music by: Bronisław Kaper
- Distributed by: Metro-Goldwyn-Mayer
- Release date: November 3, 1949
- Running time: 112 minutes
- Country: United States
- Language: English
- Budget: $2,612,000
- Box office: $3,710,000

That Forsyte Woman (released in the United Kingdom as The Forsyte Saga) is a 1949 American romantic drama film directed by Compton Bennett and starring Greer Garson, Errol Flynn, Walter Pidgeon, Robert Young and Janet Leigh. It is an adaptation of the 1906 novel The Man of Property, the first book in The Forsyte Saga by John Galsworthy.

Walter Plunkett and Arlington Valles were nominated for an Oscar for Best Costume Design, Color. The original music score was composed by Bronisław Kaper.

Filmink magazine wrote that the movie featured "perhaps Flynn’s most famous 'capital-A-Acting' performance".

== Plot ==
Irene is married to Soames Forsyte, a Victorian "man of property." Irene married without love, after having many proposals. Soames is preoccupied with material possessions, and considers Irene to be one of them. Irene eventually rebels against Soames' treatment of her.

Irene falls in love with unconventional architect Philip Bosinney, who is engaged to Soames' niece June. June happens to be one of Irene's closest friends. Soames learns of Irene's affair with Bosinney, and rather than allowing Irene to leave him, he slaps her. When Soames and Bosinney discover that Irene has run away, Bosinney rushes out in the foggy London streets after her. Bosinney is run over in an accident.

After Irene learns of Bosinney's death, she takes refuge with Soames' younger brother, Jolyon. Jolyon is June's estranged father, but has sympathy for Irene's plight. Irene and Young Jolyon eventually marry, after Irene spurns Soames' attempts at reconciliation.

== Cast ==
- Errol Flynn as Soames Forsyte
- Greer Garson as Irene Forsyte
- Walter Pidgeon as Young Jolyon Forsyte
- Robert Young as Philip Bosinney
- Janet Leigh as June Forsyte
- Harry Davenport as Old Jolyon Forsyte
- Aubrey Mather as James Forsyte
- Gerald Oliver Smith as Wilson
- Lumsden Hare as Roger Forsyte
- Stanley Logan as Swithin Forsyte
- Halliwell Hobbes as Nicholas Forsyte
- Matt Moore as Timothy Forsyte
- Florence Auer as Ann Forsyte Heyman
- Phyllis Morris as Julia Forsyte Small
- Marjorie Eaton as Hester Forsyte
- Lilian Bond as Maid
- Evelyn Beresford as Mrs. Taylor

== Background ==
Metro-Goldwyn-Mayer bought the film rights to The Forsyte Saga in 1937 after much negotiating over a long period of time. Initial plans were to make an all-star film in the vein of Dinner at Eight or Grand Hotel, with Norma Shearer, Joan Crawford and Franchot Tone mentioned as possible stars. Joseph L. Mankiewicz was assigned to the project, which at one stage was going to be turned into two films.

James Hilton wrote a screenplay in 1938 and in 1939, and it was reported the film would be made as a vehicle for Myrna Loy. Clark Gable was going to star as Soames as his follow-up performance to Gone with the Wind. This did not proceed.

In July 1940, it was announced Greer Garson would star in the film, which would most likely use many of the supporting cast from MGM's 1940 version of Pride and Prejudice (which had starred Garson). Again, no film was made

In 1945, it was announced that Robert Lord was going to produce the first in a series of proposed movies based on the series from a script by Robert Nathan. Deborah Kerr and Garson were named as possible leads. Eventually, Garson was set for the female lead. She had reservations about the script and threatened to withdraw but changed her mind after further work on it. Compton Bennett signed to direct, and producing duties were taken over by Leon Gordon, who said the film would mostly concentrate on the story of A Man of Property (written between 1903 and 1906).

(When the script went to credit arbitration with the Writers Guild of America, it was revealed that 13 writers had done 17 adaptations in all. The writers included James Hilton, Richard Llewellyn, Robert Nathan, Ivan Tors, Robert Lord, Lawrence Weingarten, John Balderston, Arthur Wimperis, Ann Cunningham, Franclien McConnell, John Collier, Jan Lustig and J.B. Williams. Under guild rules at the time, only three writers could be credited. These ended up being Tors, Lustig and Williams.)

MGM wanted Michael Wilding for one of the leads but were unable to get him. In November, it was announced Errol Flynn would join the cast – he was under contract to Warners, but MGM had had a one-picture call on his services ever since Warner Bros borrowed William Powell from MGM for Life with Father. Robert Young, Janet Leigh and Walter Pidgeon rounded out the main stars.

Reportedly, Flynn was cast as the bohemian artist Jolyon and Pidgeon as the stuffy banker Soames. When they met on the set, and discovered that they both were tired of being typecast, they decided to switch roles. (This casting was publicly confirmed in December.)

Filming took place from December 1948 to March 1949. Flynn and Garson were recalled for reshoots in June.

Robert Young later claimed he developed his English accent from listening to records of Maurice Evans and Laurence Olivier.

Flynn and Garson got along surprisingly well during filming and discussed making another film together, such as a project about female pirate Mary Burns. However, this movie was not made.

== Release ==
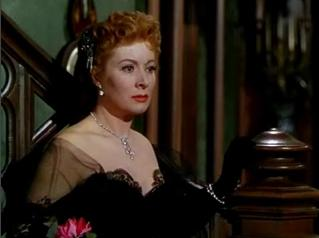
Greer Garson in That Forsyte Woman

In August 1949, it was announced the film's U.S. title would be That Forsyte Woman.

The movie was selected for the Royal Command Performance of 1949. This happened on 17 November, attended by the King, the Queen, and the two princesses.

== Reception ==
The Washington Post wrote, "while it's long, talkative and musty, there is a certain lush sincerity about it." The Los Angeles Times wrote the casting of Errol Flynn as Soames "is about the only neat trick with which the filmmakers have succeeded in enlivening a photographed novel and one that is virtually without other surprises."

Bosley Crowther panned the film in his November 11, 1949 review for The New York Times, beginning with what he saw as the betrayal of Irene, “One of the most intriguing characters in the English fiction of our times….And, to be quite blunt about it, Miss Garson and M-G-M have done just about as cruelly by her as anyone could possibly do. …(making) a production out of her and (letting) the real lady go hang. …the script is a lot of lifeless rhetoric and the direction by Compton Bennett is absurd….”

That Forsyte Woman ranked ninth among popular film at the British box office in 1949. It recorded admissions of 1,341,629 in France.

According to MGM records, the film made $1,855,000 in the U.S. and Canada and $1,855,000 overseas, ultimately earning the studio a loss of $574,000.
