= Morituri (1965 film) =

1965 film by Bernhard Wicki

- original movie poster
- Directed by: Bernhard Wicki
- Screenplay by: Daniel Taradash
- Based on: Morituri (1958 novel) by Werner Jörg Lüddecke
- Produced by: Aaron Rosenberg
- Starring: Marlon Brando; Yul Brynner; Janet Margolin; Trevor Howard; Wally Cox
- Cinematography: Conrad L. Hall
- Edited by: Joseph Silver
- Music by: Jerry Goldsmith
- Production company: Arcola-Colony Productions
- Distributed by: Twentieth Century-Fox
- Release date: August 25, 1965
- Running time: 123 minutes
- Country: United States
- Language: English
- Budget: $6,290,000
- Box office: $3,000,000

Morituri (also known as The Saboteur: Code Name Morituri) is a 1965 American war thriller film directed by Bernhard Wicki, written by Daniel Taradash, and starring Marlon Brando, Yul Brynner, Janet Margolin and Trevor Howard. The cinematography was by Conrad L. Hall, and the film musical score was composed by Jerry Goldsmith.

Based on a 1958 novel of the same title by German writer Werner Jörg Lüddecke, the film centers on a German pacificist (Brando) blackmailed by the Allies into sabotaging a Nazi-controlled merchant ship, whose captain is having his own second thoughts about the war effort. The title of the film is from the Latin expression "Morituri te salutant" (“Those who are about to die salute you”), attributed to Roman gladiators.

Released by 20th Century Fox on August 25, 1965, Morituri received generally positive reviews but was a commercial flop. It was nominated for two Oscars in the 38th Academy Awards, for Best Black-and-White Cinematography and Best Black-and-White Costume Design.

== Plot ==
Robert Crain is a wealthy German engineer and pacifist who fled to India under a fabricated Swiss identity after being conscripted into the Wehrmacht at the start of World War II. He is blackmailed by Colonel Statter of British Army Intelligence into participating in a plan to seize a shipment of rubber, which is in short supply and essential for both sides' war efforts, that will soon be carried by the German merchant ship Ingo from Japan to Nazi-occupied Bordeaux. All German merchant ships are under orders to scuttle themselves to prevent the capture of their cargoes by Allied forces, so Crain's task is to use his engineering knowledge to disable the scuttling charges on the Ingo before the Allies move to take the ship. Crain is provided with fake documentation and a cover story: he is Standartenführer Hans Keil, a high-ranking SS officer needing to return to Germany.

Aboard the Ingo, Crain finds the captain, Mueller, to be a patriotic German whose humanistic inclinations are at odds with Nazi principles. The first officer, Kruse, is a fanatical Party member who keeps a close eye on the captain, and the crew is a mix of Nazi loyalists and political prisoners who were pressed into service due to labor shortages. Crain begins covertly locating and disarming the scuttling charges. To deflect suspicion about his movements, he uses the charges to convince Kruse, who is unaware of the scuttling protocol, that he is secretly tasked with protecting the ship from a saboteur, and stokes Kruse's doubts about the captain's loyalties. Later, after one of the prisoners tries to kill Crain, he enlists them in a plan to have the Allies take the ship, while also winning Mueller's grudging trust by persuading him not to fire the scuttling charges when the ship is almost torpedoed by a Japanese submarine due to its disguise as a British merchantman.

That submarine has two German Naval officers aboard, along with a number of American prisoners and Esther, a young German-Jewish woman who has been raped and tortured by her Nazi captors. Complications arise when the submarine meets with the ship to transfer Esther and the prisoners. Despite the horrors Esther was subjected to, she is still openly defiant of every German she encounters on board the ship, including Mueller and Crain. When Mueller is alone with her, he is able to overcome her expectation that he too is a brutalizer, adding that he will assist her to escape once the ship gets to Europe, a hope that is soon dashed when Kruse also learns that she is Jewish. Later Crain persuades her to join in his plot, but she is disgusted by his lack of commitment to the anti-Nazi cause.

The two German Naval officers, who are familiar with military personnel and operations in the Far East, become suspicious of Crain's SS identity and return to the submarine to check on his credentials by radioing to Berlin, giving Crain less than 24 hours to complete his mission. While awaiting the Naval officers' report Captain Mueller hears that his son, a German Navy officer, has been decorated for sinking an Allied hospital ship. Disgusted by this, Mueller becomes drunk and reveals in a rage the full extent of his anti-Nazi beliefs, which gives Kruse a reason to declare the captain unfit and take command of the ship. Meanwhile, about to be exposed, Crain organizes a mutiny. For it to have any chance of success the American prisoners would need to participate, but when Esther appeals to them for help they only agree on condition that they can have sex with her, and she accepts.

Just before the mutiny occurs, Kruse receives the submarine radio message that Crain's SS identity is false, and arms the loyal part of the crew. The mutiny is then easily defeated and the mutineers are assembled at gunpoint. Esther is thrown to the deck. Unable to bear any more, she throws herself at Kruse who shoots her. Mueller maintains he is "no traitor" and refuses to aid him - Crain is able to elude his pursuers long enough to detonate the scuttling charges he had not yet disabled. The surviving crew abandon ship, during which the anti-Nazi German sailors make sure the wounded Kruse drowns, as they laugh at him. Crain and Mueller are then the only persons left on board. Barrels of lard in the ship's hold spill open, expand and act as a stopper, temporarily keeping the ship afloat. Crain asks the captain to radio the Allies for rescue, and is surprised when he does so.

== Cast ==
- Marlon Brando as Robert Crain / Hans Keil
- Yul Brynner as Captain Mueller
- Janet Margolin as Esther Levy
- Trevor Howard as Colonel Statter
- Martin Benrath as Kruse
- Hans Christian Blech as "Donkeyman"
- Wally Cox as Dr. Ambach
- Max Haufler as Branner
- Rainer Penkert as Milkereit
- William Redfield as Baldwin
- Oscar Beregi Jr. as Admiral Wendel (credited as Oscar Beregi)
- Martin Brandt as Nissen
- Charles De Vries as Kurz
- Carl Esmond as Busch
- Martin Kosleck as Wilke
- Norbert Schiller as Steward
- Robert Sorrells as Koeniger
- Ivan Triesault as Lieutenant Brandt
- Harold Dyrenforth as Cornelson
- Eric Braeden as Radio Officer
- Henry Rowland, Wilhelm von Homburg, Roy N. Sickner, and Rick Traeger as Ingo Crew Members
- George Takei as Japanese Junior Officer

== Title ==
The title, Morituri, is the plural of a Latin future participle meaning "about to die," and is taken from a salutation attributed to Roman gladiators by Suetonius, "Ave Imperator, morituri te salutant" ("Hail, Emperor, those who are about to die salute you").

== Production ==
=== Casting ===
Gregory Peck, Charlton Heston, and Robert Stack were all considered to play Crane. Lee J. Cobb was originally cast to play the Captain (called 'Asmann' in early drafts), but was replaced by Yul Brynner before filming began.

Martin Ritt was originally attached to direct, but was fired due to disagreements with producer Aaron Rosenberg and Marlon Brando.

=== Filming ===
Much of the film was shot on an actual, repurposed World War II-era German freighter called the Blue Dolphin. The rest of the film was shot at the 20th Century Fox backlot in Hollywood.

== Reception ==
=== Box office ===
The film did not do well on its original release and was a financial disaster. In an attempt to increase its commercial appeal, the film was reissued in 1965 under a new title as Saboteur: Code Name Morituri.

According to Fox records, the film needed to earn $10,500,000 in rentals to break even and made $4,045,000.

=== Critical response ===
Critic Bosley Crowther of the New York Times criticized it for being "turgid." He praised Brando's performance, however, saying:

It is a role that calls for Mr. Brando to play a slyly deceptive game, conning the suspicious ship's officers into trusting him while he sneaks around defusing the explosive charges, and then to risk his neck in several ways while he secretly musters a gang of prisoners and dissatisfied crewmen to take control of the ship.

And he plays it with evident enjoyment, milking the moments of suspense with all his beautiful skill at holding pauses and letting tense thought churn behind his bland eyes. Again he speaks with a juicy German accent, as he did in "The Young Lions," and affects the elegant air of a fellow who packs an iron fist in a silken glove.

But, alas, the melodrama is as turgid as that title they have given the film, and anxiety over the fate of Mr. Brando is dissipated in a vastly cluttered plot.

On review aggregator Rotten Tomatoes, Morituri holds a score of 75% based on 8 reviews, with an average rating of 7.3/10.

=== Awards and nominations ===
The film was nominated for two Oscars in the 38th Academy Awards (1966) for best black-and-white cinematography (Conrad L. Hall) and best black-and-white costume design (Moss Mabry).

== Meet Marlon Brando ==
After having appeared in a series of box office disappointments, Brando agreed to promote Morituri for the studio by participating in a day-long press junket at the Hampshire House in New York City. This event was the subject of Meet Marlon Brando (1966), a 29-minute black-and-white documentary film directed by Albert and David Maysles and Charlotte Zwerin. Brando was praised for his performance in the documentary by critic Howard Thompson who wrote, "The actor was never more appealing than in this candid-camera cameo, his best performance."

The documentary premiered at the New York Film Festival in 1966. Since then, it has aired on French television but was not shown in its entirety in the United States until specialised streaming service Fandor made it available on November 15, 2013.
