= Bill Thomas (costume designer) =

American costume designer (1921–2000)

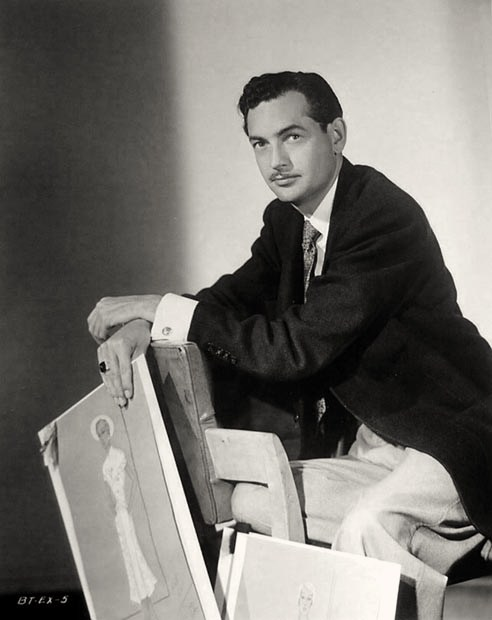
- Bill Thomas (1951)
- Born: William Thomas; October 13, 1921; Chicago, Illinois, USA
- Died: May 30, 2000 (aged 78); Beverly Hills, Los Angeles, California, USA
- Occupation: Costume Designer
- Years active: 1950-1983

Bill Thomas (October 13, 1921 – May 30, 2000) was an Academy Award-winning American costume designer with over 180 credits, best known for films such as Babes in Toyland, Spartacus and The Happiest Millionaire. He was nominated ten times for the Academy Award for Best Costume Design, winning once for Spartacus.

In 2006 he was inducted into the Costume Designers Guild Hall of Fame.

== Academy Award nominations and wins ==
Year	Category	Nominated work	Result	Ref.
1960	Best Costume Design — Black and White	Seven Thieves	Nominated	
1960	Best Costume Design — Color	Spartacus	Won	
1961	Best Costume Design — Color	Babes in Toyland	Nominated	
1962	Best Costume Design — Color	Bon Voyage!	Nominated	
1963	Best Costume Design — Black and White	Toys in the Attic	Nominated	
1965	Best Costume Design — Black and White	Ship of Fools	Nominated	
1965	Best Costume Design — Color	Inside Daisy Clover	Nominated	
1967	Best Costume Design	The Happiest Millionaire	Nominated	
1970	Best Costume Design	The Hawaiians	Nominated	
1971	Best Costume Design	Bedknobs and Broomsticks	Nominated	
