= Gile Steele =

American costume designer (1908–1952)

- Born: September 24, 1908; Cleveland, Ohio, USA
- Died: March 16, 1952 (aged 43); Santa Monica, California, U.S.
- Resting place: Forest Lawn Memorial Park (Glendale, California)
- Occupation: Costume Designer
- Years active: 1938–1952
- Known for: Costume Designer at Metro-Goldwyn-Mayer and Paramount Pictures
- Awards: Academy Award for Best Costume Design x 2

Gile Steele (September 24, 1908 — January 16, 1952) was a Hollywood costume designer.

His career began at MGM in 1938 with one of his first assignments being the Norma Shearer film Marie Antoinette. He also worked on many of the company's prestige pictures including Pride and Prejudice and Boom Town (both 1940), Blossoms in the Dust and Dr. Jekyll and Mr. Hyde (both 1941), Mrs. Miniver (1942) and Madame Curie (1943). He was one of the first nominees when the category for Best Costume Design was introduced at the Academy Awards in 1948 for his work on The Emperor Waltz.

He won the Oscar for Best Costume design for The Heiress in 1949 and Samson and Delilah in 1950.

Steele was also an amateur painter of some note.

He went to Chouinard Art Institute in Los Angeles, circa 1927.

== Death ==
Steele died around midnight on the evening of January 15-16, 1952. He was driving on Sepulveda Blvd. in Santa Monica when a wall of floodwater 15 feet (4.6 m) high swept his car from the road and deposited it 150 feet (46 m) away in a stormwater drainage area. He drowned before rescuers could get to him.

Steele was divorced. He was survived by his former wife, Barbara Spencer, and his three young children.
