= Leah Rhodes =

American costume designer

Leah Rhodes (July 21, 1902 in Port Arthur, Texas – October 17, 1986) was an American costume designer.

Rhodes was born Leah Margaret Montgomery in Port Arthur, Texas. As a young woman, Rhodes worked as a sign painted and window designer in Port Arthur and San Antonio. In 1921, she married auto mechanic Russel Spurgeon Rhodes. Five years later the couple moved to the San Fernando Valley where Russel managed a car dealership.

After moving to California, Rhodes began working as a buyer and shopper for Warner Brothers. Eventually, she became Orry-Kelly's chief assistant. When Orry-Kelly enlisted in the army, Rhodes took over Bette Davis's wardrobe for Old Acquaintances.

Rhodes gained more attention after working on The Big Sleep in 1946. This led to films like Key Largo (1948), Adventures of Don Juan (1949) (for which she won the Academy Award for Best Costume Design), White Heat (1949) and Strangers on a Train (1951). Her last film was the Howard Hawks Western Rio Lobo, in 1970.
