= Yvonne Blake =

British and Spanish costume designer (1940–2018)

The Most Excellent Yvonne Blake
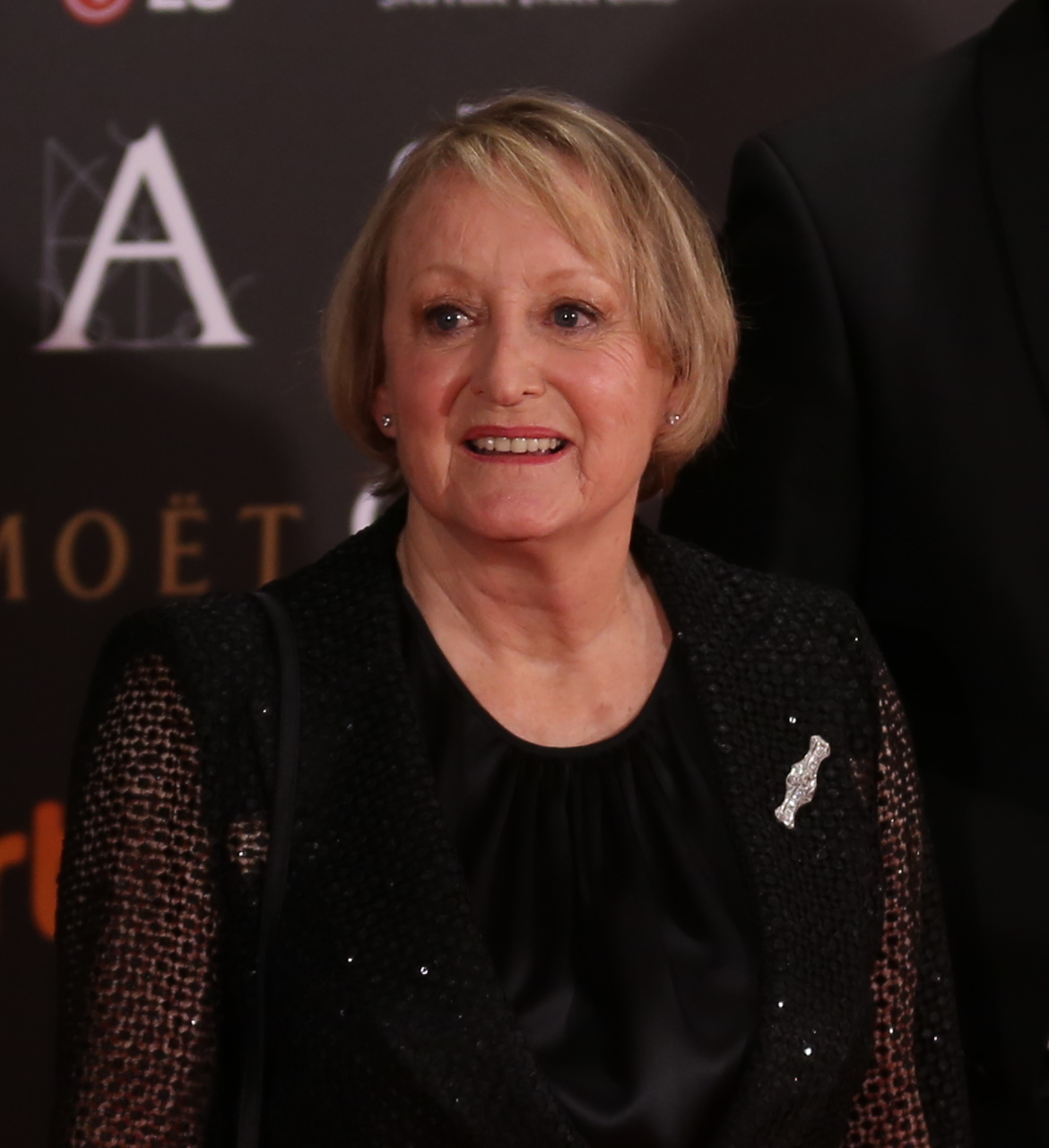
- Blake at the 31st Goya Awards in 2017
- Born: Yvonne Ann Blake; 17 April 1940; Manchester, England
- Died: 17 July 2018 (aged 78); Madrid, Spain
- Occupation: Costume designer
- Years active: 1966–2011
- Spouse: Gil Carretero (m. 1970)
- Children: 1

Yvonne Ann Blake (17 April 1940 – 17 July 2018) was a British and Spanish costume designer. She was best known for creating the costumes for superhero films Superman (1978) as well as its sequel Superman II (1980). Her accolades include an Academy Award and four Goya Awards, in addition to nominations for four BAFTA Awards and two Emmy Awards.

== Early life and education ==
Blake was born in Manchester, England, on 17 April 1940. At 16, she won a one-year scholarship to study art, design, and sculpture at Manchester's Regional College of Art and then acquired an internship at London's costume house Bermans.

== Career ==
Blake began her career as an assistant costume designer at Hammer Film Productions, working on the thriller drama film Never Take Sweets from a Stranger (1960) and the horror film The Shadow of the Cat (1961). She received her first major screen credits for designing costumes in Daniel Mann's 1966 drama film Judith, starring Sophia Loren.

Blake went to Spain for the first time in 1968. She was preparing wardrobes for Richard Quine's 1969 Western comedy film A Talent for Loving, and while on the sets, she was introduced to then-assistant director, Spaniard Gil Carretero, whom she later married.

In 1970, Hollywood film producer Sam Spiegel approached her to collaborate with director Franklin J. Schaffner on creating the costumes for his epic period drama Nicholas and Alexandra (1971), about the last of the Romanovs. Blake, then-29-year-old, signed on the project, which she recalled as the biggest challenge of her career. During extensive preparations for that large-scale production, she was in charge of several departments and caught in the middle of a creative team conflict. Blake felt extremely exhausted at the end of the filming and even considered quitting the profession altogether. Despite various obstacles, her efforts, along with those of fellow collaborator Antonio Castillo, ultimately paid off, winning them the Academy Award for Best Costume Design. Accepting an Oscar, she said "If it wasn’t for the Russian Revolution, I wouldn’t be here."

Even though she enjoyed continued success in period dramas, her greatest achievement was designing costumes for Richard Donner's landmark superhero film Superman (1978).

=== Spanish Film Academy presidency ===
In October 2016, Blake was elected president of the Academy of Cinematographic Arts and Sciences of Spain. From that position, she fought to broaden the academy's horizons and encourage cooperation with international associations. Blake arranged a meeting between the American Academy of Motion Picture Arts and Sciences and its Spanish counterpart on the one-year anniversary of her election. She was also among the driving forces behind the Federation of Ibero-American Film Academies.

Blake suffered a stroke in January 2018 and had been on medical leave from the presidency, with Mariano Barroso served as interim president in her absence. He was later elected in his own right in June of that year.

== Illness and death ==
Blake died of complications from a stroke in Madrid on 17 July 2018, at age 78.

== Awards and nominations ==
Major associations

Academy Awards

Year	Category	Nominated work	Result	Ref.
1972	Best Costume Design	Nicholas and Alexandra	Won	
1976	Best Costume Design	The Four Musketeers	Nominated	

BAFTA Awards

Year	Category	Nominated work	Result	Ref.
British Academy Film Awards
1972	Best Costume Design	Nicholas and Alexandra	Nominated	
1974	Best Costume Design	Jesus Christ Superstar	Nominated	
1975	Best Costume Design	The Three Musketeers	Nominated	
1976	Best Costume Design	The Four Musketeers	Nominated	

Emmy Awards

Year	Category	Nominated work	Result	Ref.
Primetime Emmy Awards
1987	Outstanding Costumes for a Miniseries, Movie, or Special	Casanova	Nominated	
2002	Outstanding Costumes for a Miniseries, Movie, or Special	James Dean	Nominated	

Miscellaneous awards

List of Yvonne Blake other awards and nominations
Award	Year (Note: Indicates the year of ceremony. Each year is linked to the article about the awards held that year, wherever possible.)	Category	Title	Result	Ref.
Goya Awards	1989	Best Costume Design	Rowing with the Wind	Won	
Goya Awards	1992	Best Costume Design	Don Juan in Hell	Nominated	
Goya Awards	1993	Best Costume Design	The Anonymous Queen	Nominated	
Goya Awards	1995	Best Costume Design	Cradle Song	Won	
Goya Awards	2004	Best Costume Design	Carmen	Won	
Goya Awards	2005	Best Costume Design	The Bridge of San Luis Rey	Won	
Goya Awards	2007	Best Costume Design	Goya's Ghosts	Nominated	
Satellite Awards	2007	Best Costume Design	Goya's Ghosts	Nominated	
Saturn Awards	1979	Best Costume Design	Superman	Nominated	

== Other honours ==
- Medal of Merit in Labour in Gold (Kingdom of Spain, 14 November 2011).
- National Cinematography Prize (Kingdom of Spain, 17 September 2012).

== See also ==
- List of British Academy Award nominees and winners
- List of Spanish Academy Award winners and nominees
