= Moss Mabry =

American costume designer (1918–2006)

- Born: July 5, 1918; Marianna, Florida, USA
- Died: January 25, 2006 (aged 87); Oceanside, California, US
- Education: University of Florida
- Occupation: Academy Award-nominated costume designer

Moss Mabry (July 5, 1918 – January 25, 2006) was an American costume designer.

== Biography ==
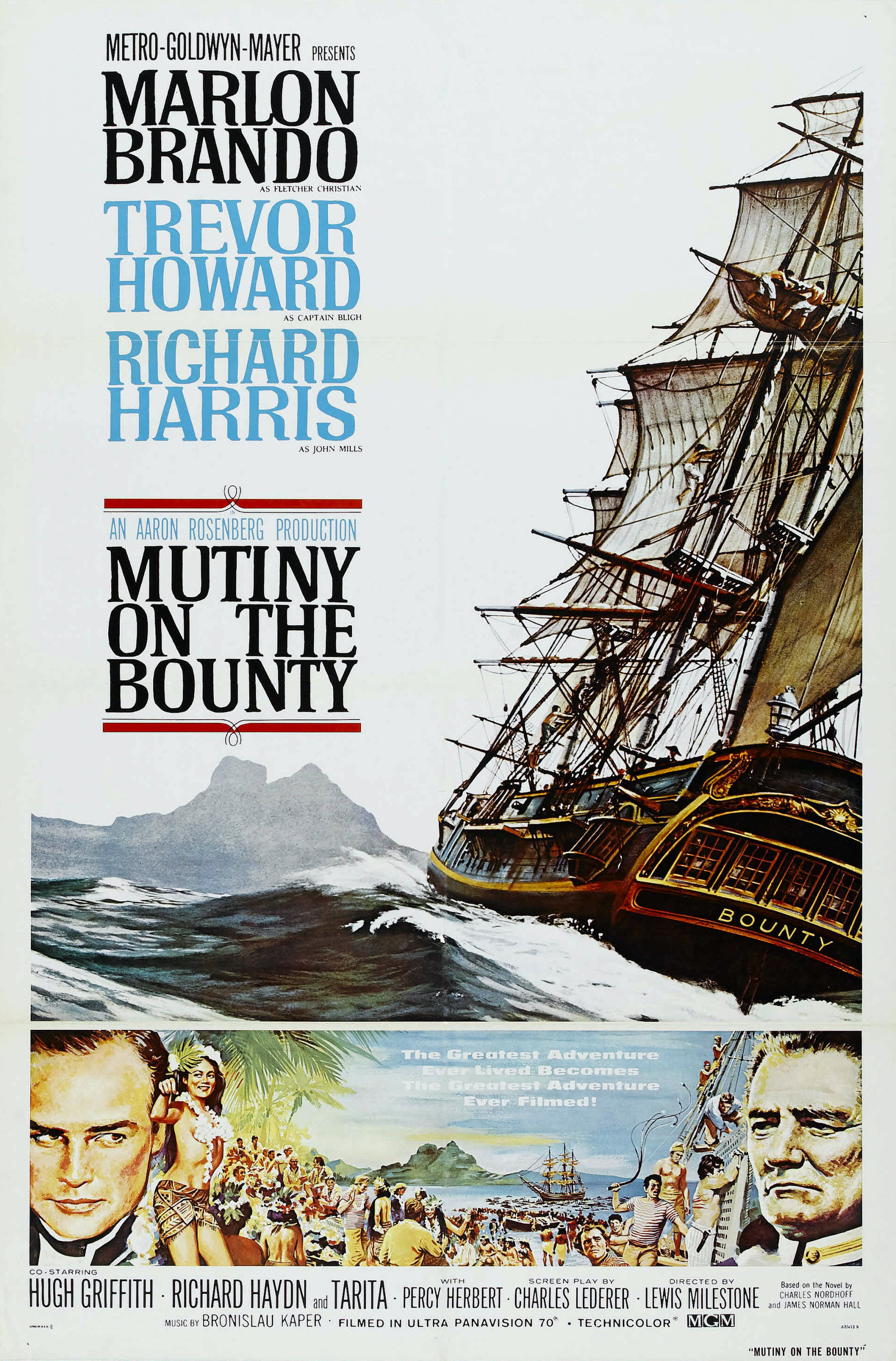
Poster for Mutiny on the Bounty

He started off designing costumes for his high school plays, but actually studied mechanical engineering at the University of Florida. He later went to Hollywood to attend art school, eventually signing a contract with Warner Bros. Some of the films he worked on included Dial M for Murder and Them! (both 1954), The Manchurian Candidate and Mutiny on the Bounty (both 1962), The Silencers, Murderers' Row (both 1966), The Detective (1968), Bob & Carol & Ted & Alice (1969), The Shootist and King Kong (both 1976).

Mabry received four Academy Award nominations throughout his career: for Giant in 1956, What a Way to Go! in 1964, spy thriller Morituri in 1965 and The Way We Were in 1973.

One of his most iconic designs was the red jacket sported by James Dean in Rebel Without a Cause (1955). Mabry declared that his most difficult filmic assignment was the multiple costume changes required for Elizabeth Taylor in "Giant" (1956), which called for 42 changes of clothing.

In 1949, Mabry was on the Groucho Marx program "You Bet Your Life." He and his fellow contestant shared the grand prize of $2000.
