= Dorothy Jeakins =

American costume designer (1914–1995)

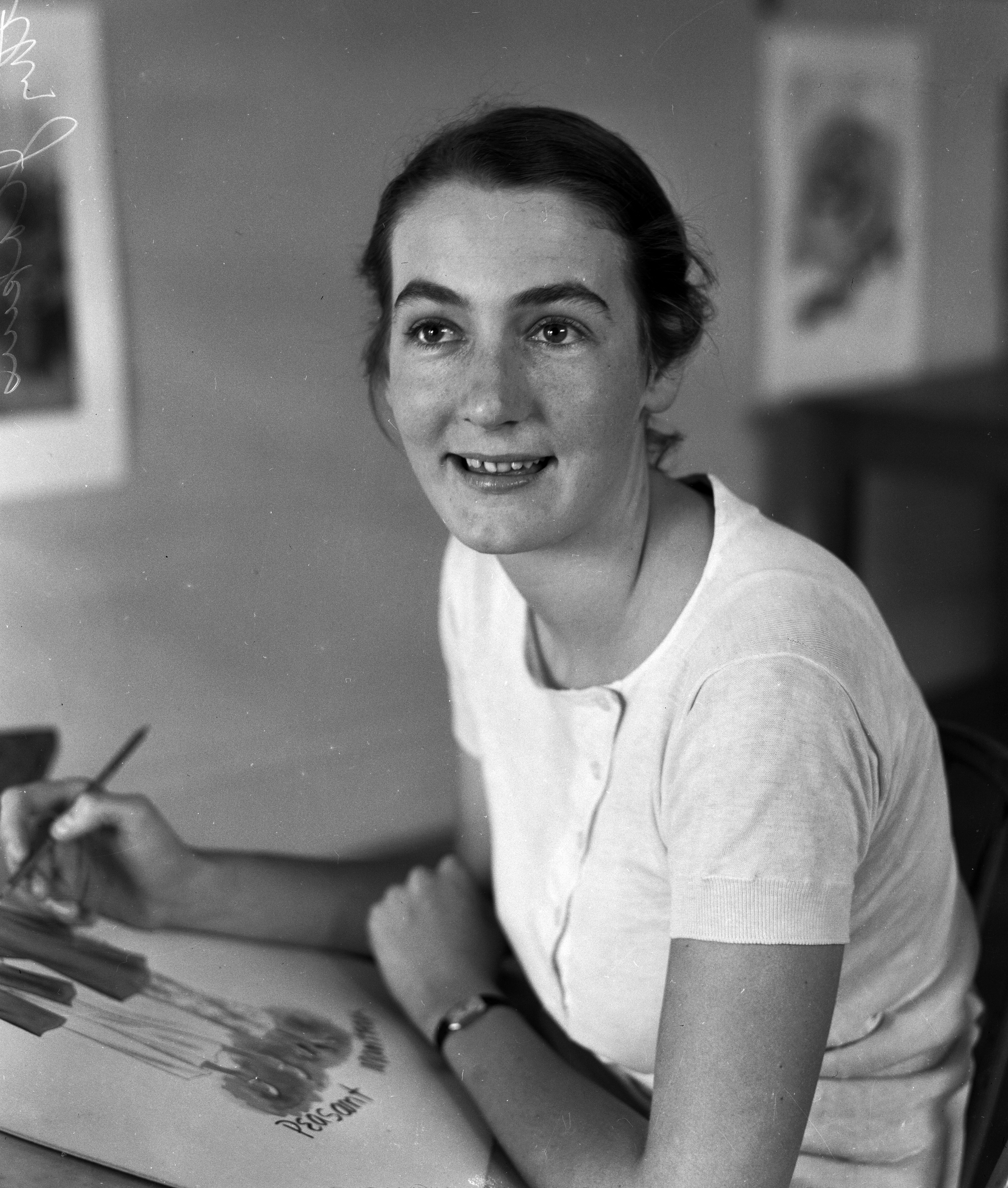
- Jeakins in 1934
- Born: January 11, 1914; San Diego, California, U.S.
- Died: November 21, 1995 (aged 81); Santa Barbara, California, U.S.
- Years active: 1948–1987
- Spouse: Ray Dannenbaum (November 20, 1939–?)
- Parents: George Tyndall Jeakins (father); Sophia Maria (von Kempf) Jeakins (mother)
- Awards: Oscar (1948, 1949, & 1964)

Dorothy Jeakins (January 11, 1914 – November 21, 1995) was an American costume designer.

== Biography ==
Born in San Diego, California, she went to public school in Los Angeles from first grade through high school. When she was a senior at Fairfax High School, she was offered a scholarship to study at the Otis Art Institute (now known as Otis College of Art and Design). She also attended the Art Students League of Los Angeles, under Stanton Macdonald-Wright. She was later awarded an Honorary Doctorate from Otis College in 1987.

Jeakins got her start working on WPA projects and as a Disney artist in the 1930s. Her fashion career began as a designer at I. Magnin's, where she was spotted by director Victor Fleming. Hired as a sketch artist for Joan of Arc (1948), Jeakins worked on the costumes along with Barbara Karinska and shared an Oscar with her in the color category. This was the first Oscar ever awarded for costumes, besides the black and white category.

Jeakins was unusual in that she freelanced, never signing a long-term contract with any one studio. She worked steadily for the next thirty-nine years, winning another two Oscars, for Samson and Delilah (1949, shared with Edith Head and others), and The Night of the Iguana (1964), and another 12 nominations. She designed period costumes for The Ten Commandments (1956), The Music Man (1962), The Sound of Music (1965), Little Big Man (1970), The Way We Were (1973), Young Frankenstein (1974) and The Dead (1987). Her modern-dress excursions included Niagara (1953), Three Coins in the Fountain (1954), South Pacific (1958) and On Golden Pond (1981).

Jeakins also worked on stage productions, including South Pacific (in which Motley was the principal costume designer), King Lear, Winesburg, Ohio and The World of Suzie Wong (for which she received her third Tony nomination), and such television productions as the 1957 production of Annie Get Your Gun, and Mayerling. For ten years beginning in 1953, she served as designer for the Los Angeles Civic Light Opera. In 1961 she was awarded a Guggenheim Fellowship to study in Japan. She spent a year there, studying theater costume. From 1967 to 1970, Ms. Jeakins was Curator of Costumes and Textiles at the Los Angeles County Museum of Art. In 1987, she was awarded the Women in Film Crystal Award for outstanding women who, through their endurance and the excellence of their work, have helped to expand the role of women within the entertainment industry. Jeakins, who retired in 1990, once summed up her designing: "I can put my world down to two words: Make beauty. It's my cue and my private passion."

== Filmography ==
Year	Title	Role	Notes
1965	The Sound of Music	Sister Augusta	Uncredited
1966	Hawaii	Hepzibah Hale	(final film role)

== Accolades ==
Association	Year	Category	Title	Result	Ref.
Academy Awards	1949	Best Costume Design, Color	Joan of Arc	Won	
Academy Awards	1951	Best Costume Design, Color	Samson and Delilah	Won	
Academy Awards	1953	Best Costume Design, Color	The Greatest Show on Earth	Nominated	
Academy Awards	1953	Best Costume Design, Black-and-White	My Cousin Rachel	Nominated	
Academy Awards	1957	Best Costume Design, Color	The Ten Commandments	Nominated	
Academy Awards	1962	Best Costume Design, Black-and-White	The Children's Hour	Nominated	
Academy Awards	1963	Best Costume Design, Color	The Music Man	Nominated	
Academy Awards	1965	Best Costume Design, Black-and-White	The Night of the Iguana	Won	
Academy Awards	1966	Best Costume Design, Color	The Sound of Music	Nominated	
Academy Awards	1967	Best Costume Design, Color	Hawaii	Nominated	
Academy Awards	1974	Best Costume Design	The Way We Were	Nominated	
Academy Awards	1988	Best Costume Design	The Dead	Nominated	
Tony Awards	1957	Best Costume Design	Major Barbara	Nominated	
Tony Awards	1957	Best Costume Design	Too Late the Phalarope	Nominated	
Tony Awards	1959	Best Costume Design	The World of Suzie Wong	Nominated	

== Sources ==
- Dorothy Jeakins at IMDb
- Oral History Interview with Dorothy Jeakins from the Smithsonian Archives of American Art, 1964.
