= Charles LeMaire =

American costume designer (1897–1985)

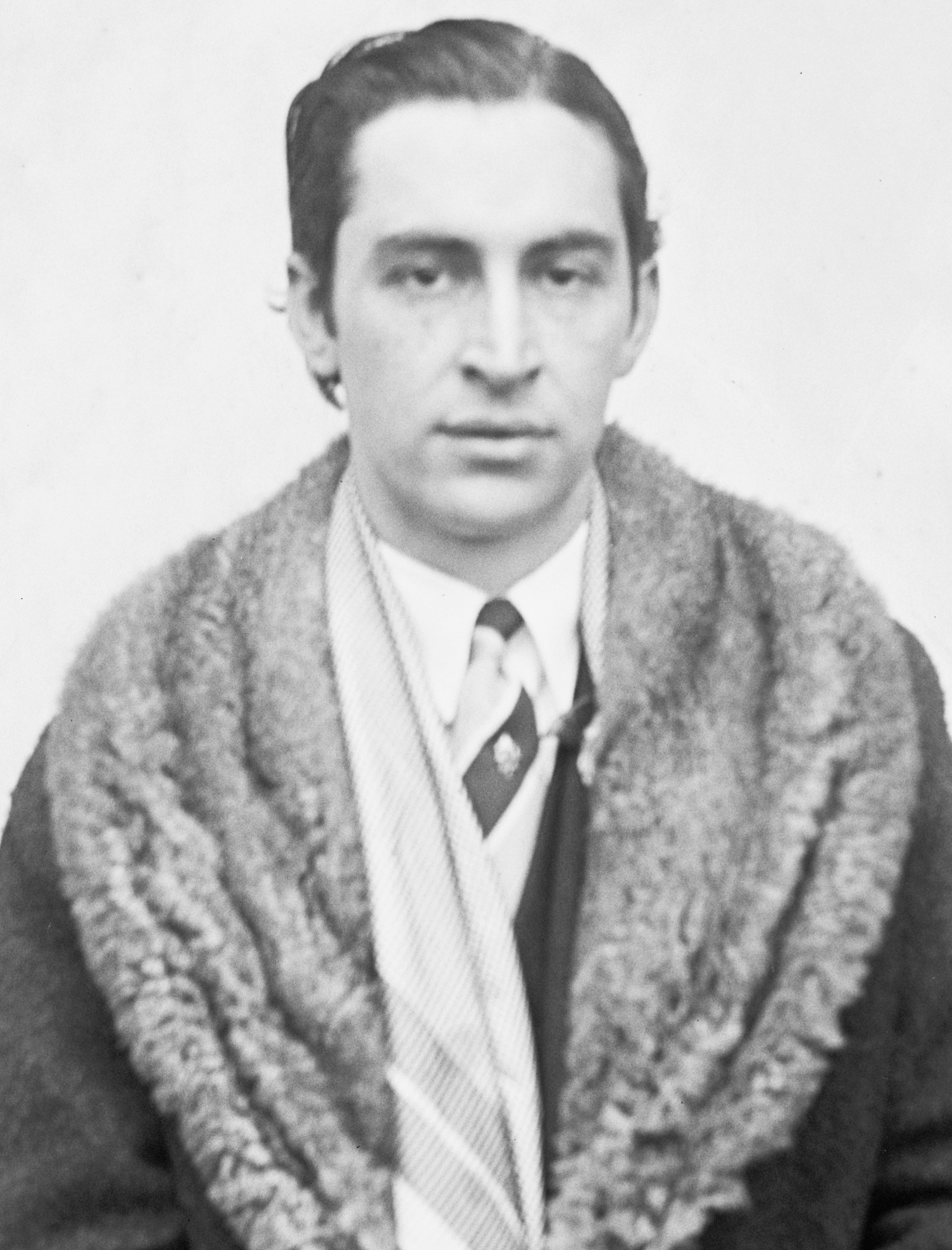
- Born: April 22, 1897; Chicago, Illinois, U.S.
- Died: June 8, 1985 (aged 88); Palm Springs, California, U.S.
- Known for: Costume designer
- Awards: Academy Awards

Charles LeMaire (April 22, 1897 – June 8, 1985) was an American costume designer.

Born in Chicago, Illinois, LeMaire began his career as a vaudeville performer, altrough he was a costume designer on such Broadway productions as Ziegfeld Follies, The Five O'Clock Girl, and Melody. He went into Hollywood film industry by 1925. LeMaire was instrumental in persuading the Academy of Motion Picture Arts and Sciences to institute a costume design Oscar. In a career spanning 37 years and nearly 300 films, he earned a total of three Academy Awards and an additional 13 nominations.

LeMaire married Beatrice Hayman Goetz (1892-1978), in Beverly Hills, California on November 27, 1943. He died of heart failure in 1985.

== Filmography ==
- Take a Chance (1933)
- The Razor's Edge (1946)
- Gentleman's Agreement (1947)
- Miracle on 34th Street (1947)
- A Letter to Three Wives (1949)
- The Gunfighter (1950)
- All About Eve (1950)^{1}
- David and Bathsheba (1951)
- The Day the Earth Stood Still (1951)
- The Robe (1953)^{1}
- Désirée (1954)^{2}
- Three Coins in the Fountain (1954)
- Love Is a Many-Splendored Thing (1955)^{1}
- Carousel (1956)
- An Affair to Remember (1957)
- Walk on the Wild Side (1962)

^1 Oscar win ^2 Oscar nomination
