= BAFTA Award for Best Costume Design =

British film industry award

- Awarded for: Best Costume Design
- Location: United Kingdom
- Presented by: British Academy of Film and Television Arts
- Currently held by: Kate Hawley for Frankenstein (2025)
- Website: https://www.bafta.org/

The BAFTA Award for Best Costume Design is a film award presented by the British Academy of Film and Television Arts (BAFTA) at the annual British Academy Film Awards to recognize a designer who has delivered outstanding costume design in a film.

BAFTA is a British organisation that hosts annual awards shows for film, television, and video games (and formerly also for children's film and television). Since 1964, selected costume designers have been awarded with the BAFTA award for Best Costume Design at an annual ceremony.

In the following lists, the titles and names in bold with a gold background are the winners and recipients respectively; those not in bold are the nominees. The years given are those in which the films under consideration were released, not the year of the ceremony, which always takes place the following year.

== Winners and nominees ==
indicates the winner

=== 1960s ===
Year	Film	Designer
**1964** (18th)	Best British Costume Design – Black and White	
**1964** (18th)	**The Pumpkin Eater**	**Motley**
**1964** (18th)	Of Human Bondage	Beatrice Dawson
**1964** (18th)	Psyche 59	Julie Harris
**1964** (18th)	Best British Costume Design – Colour	
**1964** (18th)	**Becket**	**Margaret Furse**
**1964** (18th)	The Long Ships	Anthony Mendleson
**1964** (18th)	Woman of Straw	Beatrice Dawson
**1964** (18th)	The Yellow Rolls-Royce	Anthony Mendleson
**1965** (19th)	Best British Costume Design – Black and White	
**1965** (19th)	**Not awarded**	
**1965** (19th)	Best British Costume Design – Colour	
**1965** (19th)	**Those Magnificent Men in Their Flying Machines**	**Osbert Lancaster and Dinah Greet**
**1965** (19th)	The Amorous Adventures of Moll Flanders	Elizabeth Haffenden and Joan Bridge
**1965** (19th)	Help!	Julie Harris
**1965** (19th)	A Shot in the Dark	Margaret Furse
**1965** (19th)	Young Cassidy	Margaret Furse
**1966** (20th)	Best British Costume Design – Black and White	
**1966** (20th)	**Not awarded**	
**1966** (20th)	Best British Costume Design – Colour	
**1966** (20th)	**The Wrong Box**	**Julie Harris**
**1966** (20th)	Arabesque	Christian Dior
**1966** (20th)	The Blue Max	John Furniss
**1966** (20th)	Romeo and Juliet	Nicholas Georgiadis
**1967** (21st)	Best British Costume Design – Black and White	
**1967** (21st)	**Mademoiselle**	**Jocelyn Rickards**
**1967** (21st)	The Sailor from Gibraltar	Jocelyn Rickards
**1967** (21st)	Best British Costume Design – Colour	
**1967** (21st)	**A Man for All Seasons**	**Elizabeth Haffenden and Joan Bridge**
**1967** (21st)	Casino Royale	Julie Harris
**1967** (21st)	Far from the Madding Crowd	Alan Barrett
**1967** (21st)	Half a Sixpence	Elizabeth Haffenden and Joan Bridge
Best Costume Design
**1968** (22nd)	**Romeo and Juliet**	**Danilo Donati**
**1968** (22nd)	The Charge of the Light Brigade	David Walker
**1968** (22nd)	The Lion in Winter	Margaret Furse
**1968** (22nd)	Oliver!	Phyllis Dalton
**1969** (23rd)	**Oh! What a Lovely War**	**Anthony Mendleson**
**1969** (23rd)	Funny Girl	Irene Sharaff
**1969** (23rd)	Isadora	Ruth Myers
**1969** (23rd)	Women in Love	Shirley Ann Russell

=== 1970s ===
Year	Film	Designer
**1970** (24th)	**Waterloo**	**Maria De Matteis**
**1970** (24th)	Anne of the Thousand Days	Margaret Furse
**1970** (24th)	Cromwell	Vittorio Nino Novarese
**1970** (24th)	Ryan's Daughter	Jocelyn Rickards
**1971** (25th)	**Death in Venice**	**Piero Tosi**
**1971** (25th)	The Go-Between	John Furniss
**1971** (25th)	Nicholas and Alexandra	Yvonne Blake and Antonio Castillo
**1971** (25th)	The Tales of Beatrix Potter	Christine Edzard
**1972** (26th)	**Alice's Adventures in Wonderland** / **Macbeth** / **Young Winston**	**Anthony Mendleson ^{[A]}**
**1972** (26th)	Cabaret	Charlotte Flemming
**1972** (26th)	The Godfather	Anna Hill Johnstone
**1973** (27th)	**The Hireling**	**Phyllis Dalton**
**1973** (27th)	Brother Sun, Sister Moon	Danilo Donati
**1973** (27th)	A Doll's House	Beatrice Dawson
**1973** (27th)	Jesus Christ Superstar	Yvonne Blake
**1974** (28th)	**The Great Gatsby**	**Theoni V. Aldredge**
**1974** (28th)	Chinatown	Anthea Sylbert
**1974** (28th)	Murder on the Orient Express	Tony Walton
**1974** (28th)	The Three Musketeers	Yvonne Blake
**1975** (29th)	**The Day of the Locust**	**Ann Roth**
**1975** (29th)	Barry Lyndon	Ulla-Britt Söderlund and Milena Canonero
**1975** (29th)	The Four Musketeers	Yvonne Blake
**1975** (29th)	The Man Who Would Be King	Edith Head
**1976** (30th)	**The Marquise of O**	**Moidele Bickel**
**1976** (30th)	Bugsy Malone	Monica Howe
**1976** (30th)	Picnic at Hanging Rock	Judith Dorsman
**1976** (30th)	The Slipper and the Rose	Julie Harris
**1977** (31st)	**Fellini's Casanova**	**Danilo Donati**
**1977** (31st)	Joseph Andrews	Michael Annals and Patrick Wheatley
**1977** (31st)	New York, New York	Theadora Van Runkle
**1977** (31st)	Valentino	Shirley Ann Russell
**1978** (32nd)	**Death on the Nile**	**Anthony Powell**
**1978** (32nd)	The Duellists	Tom Rand
**1978** (32nd)	Julia	Anthea Sylbert, Joan Bridge and Annalisa Nasalli-Rocca
**1978** (32nd)	Star Wars	John Mollo
**1979** (33rd)	**Yanks**	**Shirley Ann Russell**
**1979** (33rd)	Agatha	Shirley Ann Russell
**1979** (33rd)	Alien	John Mollo
**1979** (33rd)	The Europeans	Judy Moorcroft

=== 1980s ===
Year	Film	Designer
**1980** (34th)	**Kagemusha**	**Seiichiro Momosawa**
**1980** (34th)	All That Jazz	Albert Wolsky
**1980** (34th)	Don Giovanni	Frantz Salieri
**1980** (34th)	Flash Gordon	Danilo Donati
**1981** (35th)	**Chariots of Fire**	**Milena Canonero**
**1981** (35th)	Excalibur	Bob Ringwood
**1981** (35th)	The French Lieutenant's Woman	Tom Rand
**1981** (35th)	Tess	Anthony Powell
**1982** (36th)	**Blade Runner**	**Michael Kaplan and Charles Knode**
**1982** (36th)	Gandhi	Bhanu Athaiya and John Mollo
**1982** (36th)	Reds	Shirley Ann Russell
**1983** (37th)	**La Traviata**	**Piero Tosi**
**1983** (37th)	Fanny and Alexander	Marik Vos-Lundh
**1983** (37th)	Heat and Dust	Barbara Lane
**1983** (37th)	Tootsie	Ruth Morley
**1984** (38th)	**Once Upon a Time in America**	**Gabriella Pescucci**
**1984** (38th)	The Bostonians	Jenny Beavan and John Bright
**1984** (38th)	The Company of Wolves	Elizabeth Waller
**1984** (38th)	Swann in Love	Yvonne Sassinot de Nesle
**1985** (39th)	**The Cotton Club**	**Milena Canonero**
**1985** (39th)	Amadeus	Theodor Pištěk
**1985** (39th)	Legend	Charles Knode
**1985** (39th)	A Passage to India	Judy Moorcroft
**1986** (40th)	**A Room with a View**	**Jenny Beavan and John Bright**
**1986** (40th)	The Mission	Enrico Sabbatini
**1986** (40th)	Out of Africa	Milena Canonero
**1986** (40th)	Ran	Emi Wada
**1987** (41st)	**Radio Days**	**Jeffrey Kurland**
**1987** (41st)	Hope and Glory	Shirley Ann Russell
**1987** (41st)	Little Dorrit	Sands Films
**1987** (41st)	The Untouchables	Marilyn Vance-Straker
**1988** (42nd)	**The Last Emperor**	**James Acheson**
**1988** (42nd)	The Dressmaker	Judy Moorcroft
**1988** (42nd)	Empire of the Sun	Bob Ringwood
**1988** (42nd)	White Mischief	Marit Allen
**1989** (43rd)	**The Adventures of Baron Munchausen**	**Gabriella Pescucci**
**1989** (43rd)	Batman	Bob Ringwood
**1989** (43rd)	Dangerous Liaisons	James Acheson
**1989** (43rd)	Henry V	Phyllis Dalton

=== 1990s ===
Year	Film	Designer
**1990** (44th)	**Goodfellas**	**Richard Bruno**
**1990** (44th)	Cinema Paradiso	Beatrice Bulgari
**1990** (44th)	Dick Tracy	Milena Canonero
**1990** (44th)	Pretty Woman	Marilyn Vance-Straker
**1991** (45th)	**Cyrano de Bergerac**	**Franca Squarciapino**
**1991** (45th)	Edward Scissorhands	Colleen Atwood
**1991** (45th)	Robin Hood: Prince of Thieves	John Bloomfield
**1991** (45th)	Valmont	Theodor Pištěk
**1992** (46th)	**Strictly Ballroom**	**Catherine Martin and Angus Strathie**
**1992** (46th)	Chaplin	Ellen Mirojnick and John Mollo
**1992** (46th)	Howards End	Jenny Beavan and John Bright
**1992** (46th)	The Last of the Mohicans	Elsa Zamparelli
**1993** (47th)	**The Piano**	**Janet Patterson**
**1993** (47th)	Bram Stoker's Dracula	Eiko Ishioka
**1993** (47th)	Much Ado About Nothing	Phyllis Dalton
**1993** (47th)	Orlando	Sandy Powell
**1993** (47th)	Schindler's List	Anna B. Sheppard
**1994** (48th)	**The Adventures of Priscilla, Queen of the Desert**	**Tim Chappel and Lizzy Gardiner**
**1994** (48th)	Four Weddings and a Funeral	Lindy Hemming
**1994** (48th)	Interview with the Vampire	Sandy Powell
**1994** (48th)	Little Women	Colleen Atwood
**1995** (49th)	**Braveheart**	**Charles Knode**
**1995** (49th)	The Madness of King George	Mark Thompson
**1995** (49th)	Restoration	James Acheson
**1995** (49th)	Sense and Sensibility	Jenny Beavan and John Bright
**1996** (50th)	**Richard III**	**Shuna Harwood**
**1996** (50th)	The English Patient	Ann Roth
**1996** (50th)	Evita	Penny Rose
**1996** (50th)	Hamlet	Alexandra Byrne
**1997** (51st)	**Mrs Brown**	**Deirdre Clancy**
**1997** (51st)	L.A. Confidential	Ruth Myers
**1997** (51st)	Titanic	Deborah Lynn Scott
**1997** (51st)	The Wings of the Dove	Sandy Powell
**1998** (52nd)	**Velvet Goldmine**	**Sandy Powell**
**1998** (52nd)	Elizabeth	Alexandra Byrne
**1998** (52nd)	The Mask of Zorro	Graciela Mazón
**1998** (52nd)	Shakespeare in Love	Sandy Powell
**1999** (53rd)	**Sleepy Hollow**	**Colleen Atwood**
**1999** (53rd)	The End of the Affair	Sandy Powell
**1999** (53rd)	An Ideal Husband	Caroline Harris
**1999** (53rd)	Tea with Mussolini	Anna Anni, Jenny Beavan and Alberto Spiazzi

=== 2000s ===
Year	Film	Designer
**2000** (54th)	**Crouching Tiger, Hidden Dragon**	**Timmy Yip**
**2000** (54th)	Chocolat	Renee Ehrlich Kalfus
**2000** (54th)	Gladiator	Janty Yates
**2000** (54th)	The House of Mirth	Monica Howe
**2000** (54th)	Quills	Jacqueline West
**2001** (55th)	**Gosford Park**	**Jenny Beavan**
**2001** (55th)	Harry Potter and the Philosopher's Stone	Judianna Makovsky
**2001** (55th)	The Lord of the Rings: The Fellowship of the Ring	Ngila Dickson and Richard Taylor
**2001** (55th)	Moulin Rouge!	Catherine Martin and Angus Strathie
**2001** (55th)	Planet of the Apes	Colleen Atwood
**2002** (56th)	**The Lord of the Rings: The Two Towers**	**Ngila Dickson and Richard Taylor**
**2002** (56th)	Catch Me If You Can	Mary Zophres
**2002** (56th)	Chicago	Colleen Atwood
**2002** (56th)	Frida	Julie Weiss
**2002** (56th)	Gangs of New York	Sandy Powell
**2003** (57th)	**Master and Commander: The Far Side of the World**	**Wendy Stites**
**2003** (57th)	Cold Mountain	Carlo Poggioli and Ann Roth
**2003** (57th)	Girl with a Pearl Earring	Dien van Straalen
**2003** (57th)	The Lord of the Rings: The Return of the King	Ngila Dickson and Richard Taylor
**2003** (57th)	Pirates of the Caribbean: The Curse of the Black Pearl	Penny Rose
**2004** (58th)	**Vera Drake**	**Jacqueline Durran**
**2004** (58th)	The Aviator	Sandy Powell
**2004** (58th)	Finding Neverland	Alexandra Byrne
**2004** (58th)	House of Flying Daggers	Emi Wada
**2004** (58th)	The Merchant of Venice	Sammy Sheldon
**2005** (59th)	**Memoirs of a Geisha**	**Colleen Atwood**
**2005** (59th)	Charlie and the Chocolate Factory	Gabriella Pescucci
**2005** (59th)	The Chronicles of Narnia: The Lion, the Witch and the Wardrobe	Isis Mussenden
**2005** (59th)	Mrs Henderson Presents	Sandy Powell
**2005** (59th)	Pride & Prejudice	Jacqueline Durran
**2006** (60th)	**Pan's Labyrinth**	**Lala Huete**
**2006** (60th)	The Devil Wears Prada	Patricia Field
**2006** (60th)	Marie Antoinette	Milena Canonero
**2006** (60th)	Pirates of the Caribbean: Dead Man's Chest	Penny Rose
**2006** (60th)	The Queen	Consolata Boyle
**2007** (61st)	**La Vie en Rose**	**Marit Allen**
**2007** (61st)	Atonement	Jacqueline Durran
**2007** (61st)	Elizabeth: The Golden Age	Alexandra Byrne
**2007** (61st)	Lust, Caution	Lai Pan
**2007** (61st)	Sweeney Todd: The Demon Barber of Fleet Street	Colleen Atwood
**2008** (62nd)	**The Duchess**	**Michael O'Connor**
**2008** (62nd)	Changeling	Deborah Hopper
**2008** (62nd)	The Curious Case of Benjamin Button	Jacqueline West
**2008** (62nd)	The Dark Knight	Lindy Hemming
**2008** (62nd)	Revolutionary Road	Albert Wolsky
**2009** (63rd)	**The Young Victoria**	**Sandy Powell**
**2009** (63rd)	Bright Star	Janet Patterson
**2009** (63rd)	Coco Before Chanel	Catherine Leterrier
**2009** (63rd)	An Education	Odile Dicks-Mireaux
**2009** (63rd)	A Single Man	Arianne Phillips

=== 2010s ===
Year	Film	Designer
**2010** (64th)	**Alice in Wonderland**	**Colleen Atwood**
**2010** (64th)	Black Swan	Amy Westcott
**2010** (64th)	The King's Speech	Jenny Beavan
**2010** (64th)	Made in Dagenham	Louise Stjernsward
**2010** (64th)	True Grit	Mary Zophres
**2011** (65th)	**The Artist**	**Mark Bridges**
**2011** (65th)	Hugo	Sandy Powell
**2011** (65th)	Jane Eyre	Michael O'Connor
**2011** (65th)	My Week with Marilyn	Jill Taylor
**2011** (65th)	Tinker Tailor Soldier Spy	Jacqueline Durran
**2012** (66th)	**Anna Karenina**	**Jacqueline Durran**
**2012** (66th)	Great Expectations	Beatrix Aruna Pasztor
**2012** (66th)	Les Misérables	Paco Delgado
**2012** (66th)	Lincoln	Joanna Johnston
**2012** (66th)	Snow White and the Huntsman	Colleen Atwood
**2013** (67th)	**The Great Gatsby**	**Catherine Martin**
**2013** (67th)	American Hustle	Michael Wilkinson
**2013** (67th)	Behind the Candelabra	Ellen Mirojnick
**2013** (67th)	The Invisible Woman	Michael O'Connor
**2013** (67th)	Saving Mr. Banks	Daniel Orlandi
**2014** (68th)	**The Grand Budapest Hotel**	**Milena Canonero**
**2014** (68th)	The Imitation Game	Sammy Sheldon Differ
**2014** (68th)	Into the Woods	Colleen Atwood
**2014** (68th)	Mr. Turner	Jacqueline Durran
**2014** (68th)	The Theory of Everything	Steven Noble
**2015** (69th)	**Mad Max: Fury Road**	**Jenny Beavan**
**2015** (69th)	Brooklyn	Odile Dicks-Mireaux
**2015** (69th)	Carol	Sandy Powell
**2015** (69th)	Cinderella	Sandy Powell
**2015** (69th)	The Danish Girl	Paco Delgado
**2016** (70th)	**Jackie**	**Madeline Fontaine**
**2016** (70th)	Allied	Joanna Johnston
**2016** (70th)	Fantastic Beasts and Where to Find Them	Colleen Atwood
**2016** (70th)	Florence Foster Jenkins	Consolata Boyle
**2016** (70th)	La La Land	Mary Zophres
**2017** (71st)	**Phantom Thread**	**Mark Bridges**
**2017** (71st)	Beauty and the Beast	Jacqueline Durran
**2017** (71st)	Darkest Hour	Jacqueline Durran
**2017** (71st)	I, Tonya	Jennifer Johnson
**2017** (71st)	The Shape of Water	Luis Sequeira
**2018** (72nd)	**The Favourite**	**Sandy Powell**
**2018** (72nd)	The Ballad of Buster Scruggs	Mary Zophres
**2018** (72nd)	Bohemian Rhapsody	Julian Day
**2018** (72nd)	Mary Poppins Returns	Sandy Powell
**2018** (72nd)	Mary Queen of Scots	Alexandra Byrne
**2019** (73rd)	**Little Women**	**Jacqueline Durran**
**2019** (73rd)	The Irishman	Sandy Powell and Christopher Peterson
**2019** (73rd)	Jojo Rabbit	Mayes C. Rubeo
**2019** (73rd)	Judy	Jany Temime
**2019** (73rd)	Once Upon a Time in Hollywood	Arianne Phillips

=== 2020s ===
Year	Film	Designer
**2020** (74th)	**Ma Rainey's Black Bottom**	**Ann Roth**
**2020** (74th)	Ammonite	Michael O'Connor
**2020** (74th)	The Dig	Alice Babidge
**2020** (74th)	Emma	Alexandra Byrne
**2020** (74th)	Mank	Trish Summerville
**2021** (75th)	**Cruella**	**Jenny Beavan**
**2021** (75th)	Cyrano	Massimo Cantini Parrini
**2021** (75th)	Dune	Robert Morgan and Jacqueline West
**2021** (75th)	The French Dispatch	Milena Canonero
**2021** (75th)	Nightmare Alley	Luis Sequeira
**2022** (76th)	**Elvis**	**Catherine Martin**
**2022** (76th)	All Quiet on the Western Front	Lisy Christl
**2022** (76th)	Amsterdam	J.R. Hawbaker and Albert Wolsky
**2022** (76th)	Babylon	Mary Zophres
**2022** (76th)	Mrs. Harris Goes to Paris	Jenny Beavan
**2023** (77th)	**Poor Things**	**Holly Waddington**
**2023** (77th)	Barbie	Jacqueline Durran
**2023** (77th)	Killers of the Flower Moon	Jacqueline West
**2023** (77th)	Napoleon	Dave Crossman and Janty Yates
**2023** (77th)	Oppenheimer	Ellen Mirojnick
**2024** (78th)	**Wicked**	**Paul Tazewell**
**2024** (78th)	Blitz	Jacqueline Durran
**2024** (78th)	A Complete Unknown	Arianne Phillips
**2024** (78th)	Conclave	Lisy Christl
**2024** (78th)	Nosferatu	Linda Muir
**2025** (79th)	**Frankenstein**	**Kate Hawley**
**2025** (79th)	Hamnet	Malgosia Turzanska
**2025** (79th)	Marty Supreme	Miyako Bellizzi
**2025** (79th)	Sinners	Ruth E. Carter
**2025** (79th)	Wicked: For Good	Paul Tazewell

== Multiple wins and nominations ==
=== Multiple nominations ===
16 nominations

- Sandy Powell

11 nominations

- Colleen Atwood
- Jacqueline Durran

10 nominations

- Jenny Beavan

8 nominations

- Milena Canonero

6 nominations

- Alexandra Byrne
- Shirley Ann Russell

5 nominations

- Margaret Furse
- Julie Harris
- Mary Zophres

4 nominations

- Yvonne Blake
- Joan Bridge
- John Bright
- Phyllis Dalton
- Danilo Donati
- Catherine Martin
- Anthony Mendleson
- John Mollo
- Michael O'Connor
- Ann Roth
- Jacqueline West

3 nominations

- James Acheson
- Beatrice Dawson
- Ngila Dickson
- Elizabeth Haffenden
- Charles Knode
- Ellen Mirojnick
- Judy Moorcroft
- Gabriella Pescucci
- Arianne Phillips
- Jocelyn Rickards
- Bob Ringwood
- Penny Rose
- Richard Taylor
- Albert Wolsky

2 nominations

- Marit Allen
- Consolata Boyle
- Mark Bridges
- Lisy Christl
- Paco Delgado
- Odile Dicks-Mireaux
- John Furniss
- Lindy Hemming
- Monica Howe
- Joanna Johnston
- Ruth Myers
- Janet Patterson
- Theodor Pištěk
- Anthony Powell
- Tom Rand
- Luis Sequeira
- Sammy Sheldon Differ
- Angus Strathie
- Anthea Sylbert
- Paul Tazewell
- Piero Tosi
- Marilyn Vance-Straker
- Emi Wada
- Janty Yates

=== Multiple wins ===
4 wins

- Jenny Beavan

3 wins

- Colleen Atwood
- Milena Canonero
- Jacqueline Durran
- Catherine Martin
- Sandy Powell

2 wins

- Mark Bridges
- Danilo Donati
- Charles Knode
- Anthony Mendleson
- Gabriella Pescucci
- Ann Roth
- Piero Tosi

== See also ==
- Academy Award for Best Costume Design
- Costume Designers Guild Awards
- Critics' Choice Movie Award for Best Costume Design
- Satellite Award for Best Costume Design
- Saturn Award for Best Costume Design

== Notes ==
A^{1} : According to the BAFTAs database, Anthony Mendleson received a single joint award for three different films.
