= Barbara Lane =

Barbara Lane may refer to:

- Barbara Lane (engineer), Irish fire protection engineer
- Barbara G. Lane (1941–2023), American art historian
- Barbara Lane (costume designer) (born 1936), British costume designer
