= Moidele Bickel =

German costume designer (1937–2016)

- Born: 6 March 1937; Munich, Bavaria, Germany
- Died: 16 May 2016 (aged 79); Berlin, Germany
- Other name: Bernadette Vilard
- Occupation: Costume designer
- Years active: 1972–2016

Moidele Bickel (6 March 1937 – 16 May 2016) was a German costume designer. She has received various accolades, including a BAFTA Award and a César Award, in addition to a nomination for an Academy Award.

== Career ==
Bickel was born and raised in Munich, Bavaria. She began her career creating costumes for various productions at the Theater am Turm in Frankfurt. In 1970, she moved to Berlin and began frequent collaboration with renowned director Peter Stein on his many theater and opera productions, a partnership that lasted 22 years. They first worked together at the Schaubühne am Halleschen Ufer before relocating to the newly renovated venue at Schaubühne am Lehniner Platz in 1981.

Beside her work on various stage designs, Bickel was known for her extensive career in German as well as international film productions. In particular, she won the BAFTA Award for Best Costume Design for Éric Rohmer's historical drama film The Marquise of O (1976) and received a nomination for the Academy Award for Best Costume Design for another period piece, Patrice Chéreau's Queen Margot (1994).

== Awards and nominations ==
Association	Year (Note: Indicates the year of ceremony. Each year is linked to the article about the awards held that year, wherever possible.)	Category	Work	Result	Ref.
Academy Awards	1995	Best Costume Design	Queen Margot (Note: Film title used in nomination)	Nominated	
British Academy Film Awards	1977	Best Costume Design	The Marquise of O	Won	
César Awards	1995	Best Costume Design	La Reine Margot	Won	
David di Donatello Awards	1995	Best Costumes	La Reine Margot	Nominated	
German Film Awards	2010	Best Costume Design	The White Ribbon	Won	

== Death and legacy ==
Bickel died on 16 May 2016, at the age of 79 at her home in Berlin.
