= Julie Harris (costume designer) =

British costume designer (1921–2015)

- Born: Diana Julie Harris; 26 March 1921; London, England
- Died: 30 May 2015 (aged 94); London, England
- Occupation: Costume designer
- Years active: 1947–1991

Diana Julie Harris (26 March 1921 – 30 May 2015) was a British costume designer. Her accolades include an Academy Award and a BAFTA Award.

== Career ==
Born in London in 1921, Harris began her career in 1947 at Gainsborough Pictures with Holiday Camp, the forerunner of the Huggett family film series. During her early career, she was mentored by Elizabeth Haffenden, and went on to work for the Rank Organisation, until that studio wound down its business in the 1950s.

Over the next 30 years, she worked with actors such as Jayne Mansfield, Joan Crawford, Bette Davis, Lauren Bacall and Alan Ladd and directors Alfred Hitchcock, Joseph Losey, Billy Wilder and John Schlesinger. She made a "mink bikini" (actually made out of rabbit fur) for Diana Dors. She worked steadily on feature films throughout the next three decades, hitting her stride in the 1960s, before shifting her attention to television movies until her retirement in 1991.

Harris won the Oscar for Best Costume Design for Darling in 1965, and the BAFTA Award for Best Costume Design for The Wrong Box in 1967. She also worked on the Beatles' first two live action feature films, A Hard Day's Night (1964), and Help! (1965), quipping that "I must be one of the few people who can claim they have seen John, Paul, George and Ringo naked." She also worked on the James Bond film Live and Let Die (1973) with Roger Moore, and the spoof Casino Royale (1967) with David Niven. Harris also designed costumes for the Carry On film Carry On Cleo (1964), a sword and sandal spoof set in ancient Rome and Egypt, described as "perhaps the best" of the series.

Harris died after a brief illness from a chest infection, aged 94, on 30 May 2015.

== Filmography ==
=== Film ===
Year	Title	Director	Notes
1948	The Calendar	Arthur Crabtree	
1948	Good-Time Girl	David MacDonald	
1949	Once Upon a Dream	Ralph Thomas	
1950	The Body Said No!	Val Guest	
1950	Trio	Ken Annakin; Harold French	
1951	Mister Drake's Duck	Val Guest	
1951	Hotel Sahara	Ken Annakin	
1951	Another Man's Poison	Irving Rapper	
1952	So Little Time	Compton Bennett	
1952	Something Money Can't Buy	Pat Jackson	
1952	Made in Heaven	John Paddy Carstairs	
1953	The Net	Anthony Asquith	
1953	Desperate Moment	Compton Bennett	
1953	South of Algiers	Jack Lee	
1953	Always a Bride	Ralph Smart	
1954	You Know What Sailors Are	Ken Annakin	
1954	The Seekers	Ken Annakin	
1955	The Prisoner	Peter Glenville	
1955	Value for Money	Ken Annakin	
1955	Cast a Dark Shadow	Lewis Gilbert	
1955	Simon and Laura	Muriel Box	
1956	The March Hare	George More O'Ferrall	
1956	Reach for the Sky	Lewis Gilbert	
1956	It's a Wonderful World	Val Guest	
1956	House of Secrets	Guy Green	
1957	Miracle in Soho	Julian Amyes	
1957	The Story of Esther Costello	David Miller	
1958	The Sheriff of Fractured Jaw	Raoul Walsh	
1959	Sapphire	Basil Dearden	
1960	Swiss Family Robinson	Ken Annakin	
1961	The Greengage Summer	Lewis Gilbert	
1961	The Naked Edge	Michael Anderson	
1962	All Night Long	Basil Dearden	
1962	We Joined the Navy	Wendy Toye	
1962	The Fast Lady	Ken Annakin	
1963	The Cracksman	Peter Graham Scott	
1963	Tamahine	Philip Leacock	
1963	Kali Yug: Goddess of Vengeance	Mario Camerini	
1964	Father Came Too!	Peter Graham Scott	
1964	The Chalk Garden	Ronald Neame	
1964	Psyche 59	Alexander Singer	
1964	A Hard Day's Night	Richard Lester	
1964	Carry On Cleo	Gerald Thomas	
1965	Help!	Richard Lester	
1965	Darling	John Schlesinger	
1966	The Wrong Box	Bryan Forbes	
1967	Casino Royale	John Huston; Ken Hughes; Val Guest; Robert Parrish; Joseph McGrath	
1967	The Whisperers	Bryan Forbes	
1968	Prudence and the Pill	Fielder Cook	
1968	Deadfall	Bryan Forbes	
1968	Decline and Fall... of a Birdwatcher	John Krish	
1969	Goodbye, Mr. Chips	Herbert Ross	
1970	The Private Life of Sherlock Holmes	Billy Wilder	
1972	Follow Me!	Carol Reed	
1973	Live and Let Die	Guy Hamilton	
1974	The Land That Time Forgot	Kevin Connor	
1975	Rollerball	Norman Jewison	
1976	The Slipper and the Rose	Bryan Forbes	
1977	Candleshoe	Norman Tokar	
1978	The Sailor's Return	Jack Gold	
1979	Dracula	John Badham	
1979	Lost and Found	Melvin Frank	
1981	The Great Muppet Caper	Jim Henson	

=== Television ===
Year	Title	Notes
1983	The Hound of the Baskervilles	Television film
1983	The Sign of Four	Television film
1984	Arch of Triumph	Television film
1987	A Hazard of Hearts	Television film
1991	A Perfect Hero	6 episodes

== Awards and nominations ==
Award	Year (Note: Indicates the year of ceremony. Each year is linked to the article about the awards held that year, wherever possible.)	Category	Work	Result	Ref.
Academy Awards	1966	Best Costume Design – Black-and-White	Darling	Won	
British Academy Film Awards	1965	Best British Costume Design – Black and White	Psyche 59	Nominated	
British Academy Film Awards	1966	Best British Costume Design – Colour	Help!	Nominated	
British Academy Film Awards	1967	Best British Costume Design – Colour	The Wrong Box	Won	
British Academy Film Awards	1968	Best British Costume Design – Colour	Casino Royale	Nominated	
British Academy Film Awards	1977	Best Costume Design	The Slipper and the Rose	Nominated	
Saturn Awards	1978	Best Costumes	The Slipper and the Rose	Nominated	
