= 30th British Academy Film Awards =

1977 film awards ceremony

- Date: 24 March 1977
- Site: Wembley Conference Centre
- Hosted by: Esther Rantzen; Roger Moore

Highlights
- Best Film: One Flew Over the Cuckoo's Nest
- Best Actor: Jack Nicholson; One Flew Over the Cuckoo's Nest
- Best Actress: Louise Fletcher; One Flew Over the Cuckoo's Nest
- Most awards: One Flew Over the Cuckoo's Nest (6)
- Most nominations: All the President's Men and One Flew Over the Cuckoo's Nest (10)

The 30th British Academy Film Awards, more commonly known as the BAFTAs, took place on 24 March 1977 at the Wembley Conference Centre in London, honouring the best national and foreign films of 1976. Presented by the British Academy of Film and Television Arts, accolades were handed out for the best feature-length film and documentaries of any nationality that were screened at British cinemas in 1976.

Miloš Forman's One Flew Over the Cuckoo's Nest won the award for Best Film, Direction (Forman), Actor (Jack Nicholson), Actress (Louise Fletcher), Supporting Actor (Brad Dourif) and Editing (Richard Chew, Lynzee Klingman and Sheldon Kahn). The film received a total of 6 awards. Jodie Foster received Best Supporting Actress for her performances in Bugsy Malone and Taxi Driver.

The ceremony was hosted by Esther Rantzen and Roger Moore.

== Winners and nominees ==
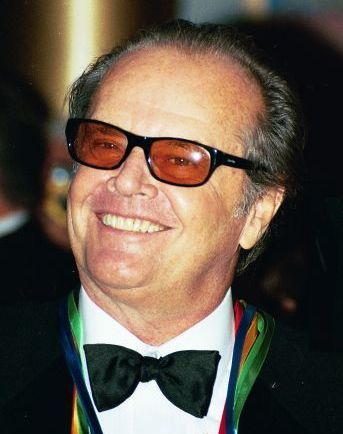
Jack Nicholson, Best Actor winner

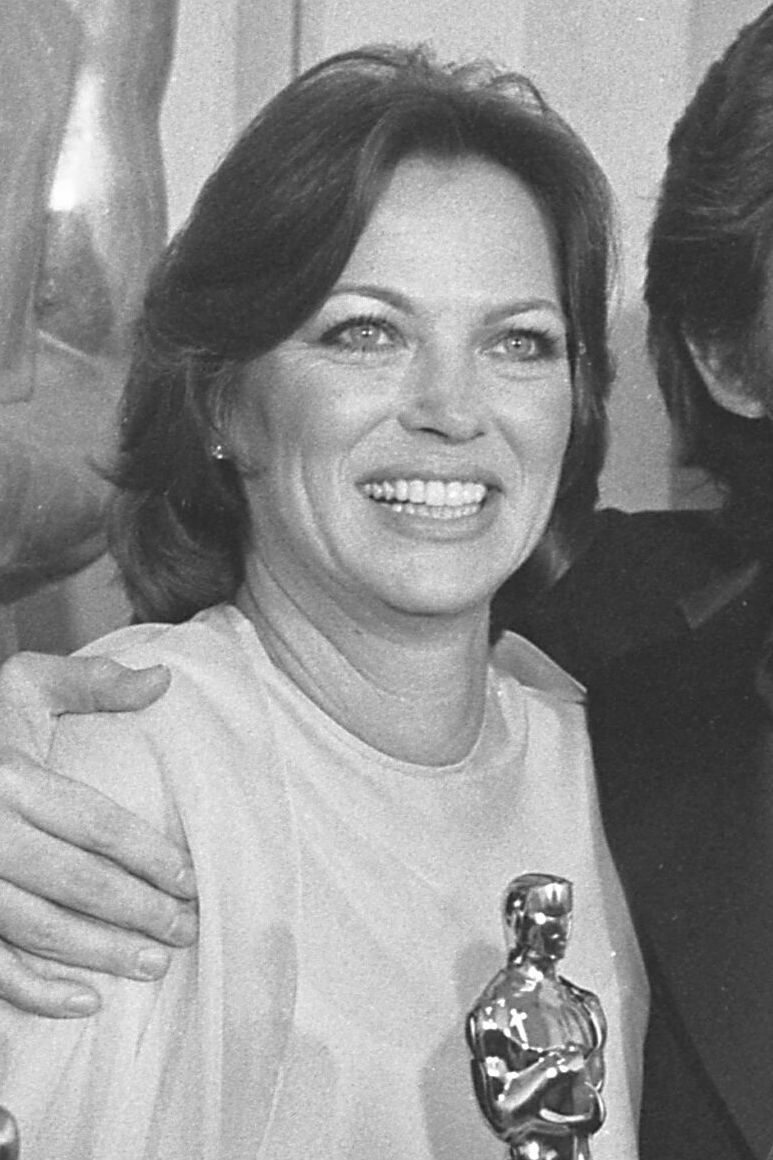
Louise Fletcher, Best Actress winner

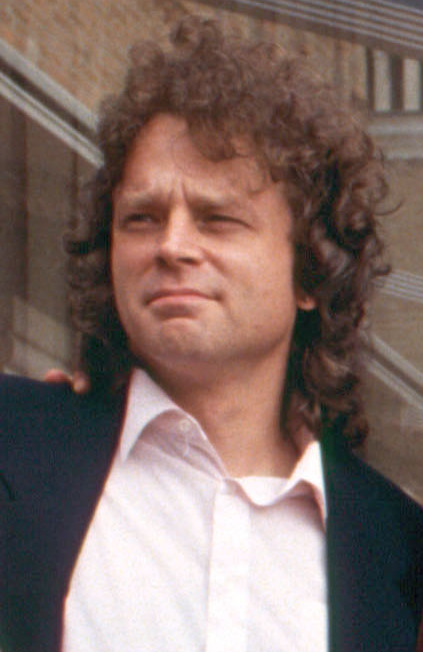
Brad Dourif, Best Supporting Actor winner

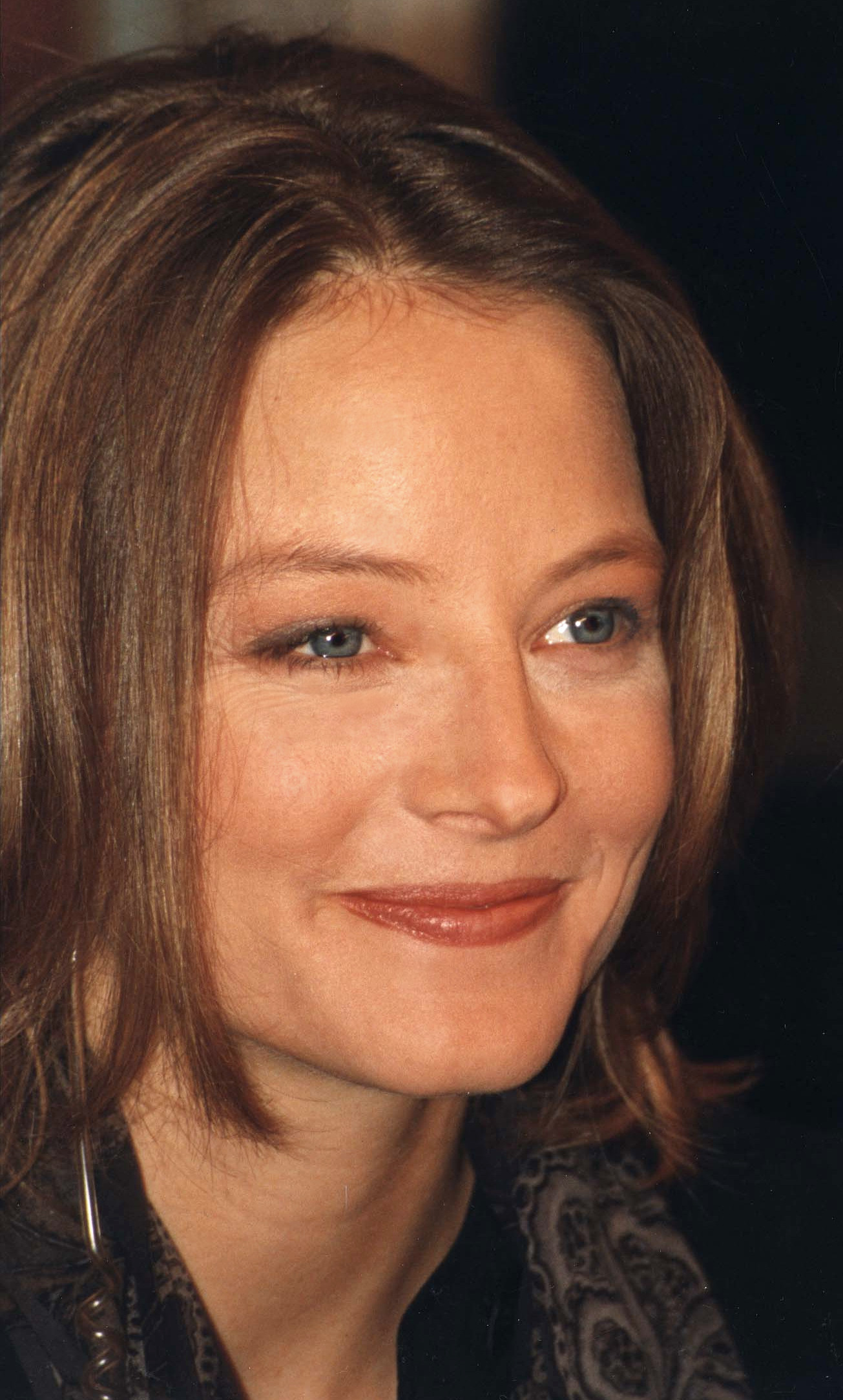
Jodie Foster, Best Supporting Actress winner

=== BAFTA Fellowship ===
- **Denis Forman**

=== Awards ===
Winners are listed first and highlighted in boldface.

| **Best Film**: **One Flew Over the Cuckoo's Nest – Miloš Forman**; All the President's Men – Alan J. Pakula; Bugsy Malone – Alan Parker; Taxi Driver – Martin Scorsese | **Best Direction**: **Miloš Forman – One Flew Over the Cuckoo's Nest**; Alan J. Pakula – All the President's Men; Alan Parker – Bugsy Malone; Martin Scorsese – Taxi Driver |
| **Best Actor in a Leading Role**: **Jack Nicholson – One Flew Over the Cuckoo's Nest as Randle "R.P." McMurphy**; Dustin Hoffman – All the President's Men as Carl Bernstein; Dustin Hoffman – Marathon Man as Thomas "Babe" Levy; Robert De Niro – Taxi Driver as Travis Bickle; Walter Matthau – The Bad News Bears as Morris Buttermaker; Walter Matthau – The Sunshine Boys as Willy Clark | **Best Actress in a Leading Role**: **Louise Fletcher – One Flew Over the Cuckoo's Nest as Nurse Ratched**; Lauren Bacall – The Shootist as Bond Rogers; Liv Ullmann – Face to Face as Jenny Isaksson; Rita Moreno – The Ritz as Googie Gomez |
| **Best Actor in a Supporting Role**: **Brad Dourif – One Flew Over the Cuckoo's Nest as Billy Bibbit**; Jason Robards – All the President's Men as Ben Bradlee; Martin Balsam – All the President's Men as Howard Simons; Michael Hordern – The Slipper and the Rose as King | **Best Actress in a Supporting Role**: **Jodie Foster – Bugsy Malone as Tallulah**; **Jodie Foster – Taxi Driver as Iris**; Annette Crosbie – The Slipper and the Rose as Fairy Godmother; Billie Whitelaw – The Omen as Mrs. Baylock; Vivien Merchant – The Homecoming as Ruth |
| **Best Screenplay**: **Bugsy Malone – Alan Parker**; All the President's Men – William Goldman; One Flew Over the Cuckoo's Nest – Lawrence Hauben and Bo Goldman; The Sunshine Boys – Neil Simon | **Best Cinematography**: **Picnic at Hanging Rock – Russell Boyd**; Aces High – Gerry Fisher and Peter Allwork; All the President's Men – Gordon Willis; One Flew Over the Cuckoo's Nest – Haskell Wexler, Bill Butler and William A. Fraker |
| **Best Costume Design**: **The Marquise of O (Die Marquise von O...) – Moidele Bickel**; Bugsy Malone – Monica Howe; Picnic at Hanging Rock – Judy Dorsman; The Slipper and the Rose – Julie Harris | **Best Editing**: **One Flew Over the Cuckoo's Nest – Richard Chew, Lynzee Klingman and Sheldon Kahn**; All the President's Men – Robert L. Wolfe; Marathon Man – Jim Clark; Taxi Driver – Marcia Lucas, Tom Rolf and Melvin Shapiro |
| **Best Original Music**: **Taxi Driver – Bernard Herrmann** (posthumous); Bugsy Malone – Paul Williams; One Flew Over the Cuckoo's Nest – Jack Nitzsche; The Slipper and the Rose – Richard M. Sherman and Robert B. Sherman | **Best Production Design**: **Bugsy Malone – Geoffrey Kirkland**; All the President's Men – George C. Jenkins; King Kong – Mario Chiari and Dale Hennesy; The Slipper and the Rose – Ray Simm |
| **Best Soundtrack**: **Bugsy Malone – Les Wiggins, Clive Winter and Ken Baker**; All the President's Men – Milton Burrow, Jim Webb, Les Fresholtz, Arthur Piantadosi and Dick Alexander; One Flew Over the Cuckoo's Nest – Mary McGlone, Robert Rutledge, Veronica Selver, Larry Jost and Mark Berger; Picnic at Hanging Rock – Greg Bell and Dan Connelly | **Best Documentary**: **The Canadians (Los Canadienses) – Albert Kish**; White Rock – Tony Maylam |
| **Best Short Factual Film**: **The End of the Road – John Armstrong**; Energy in Perspective – Peter De Normanville; The Speed Sailors – John Spencer | **Best Specialised Film**: **Hydraulics – Anthony Searle**; For the Want of a Nail – Joe Mendoza; Let's Sleep on It – Christopher Rolling; Proteins – Lawrence Crabb; Slender Chance – Michael Crosfield |
**Most Promising Newcomer to Leading Film Roles**: **Jodie Foster – Bugsy Malone / Taxi Driver as Tallulah and Iris, respectively**

== Statistics ==
Films that received multiple nominations
| Nominations | Film |
|---|---|
| 10 | All the President's Men |
| 10 | One Flew Over the Cuckoo's Nest |
| 9 | Bugsy Malone |
| 7 | Taxi Driver |
| 5 | The Slipper and the Rose |
| 3 | Picnic at Hanging Rock |
| 2 | Marathon Man |
| 2 | The Sunshine Boys |

Films that received multiple awards
| Awards | Film |
|---|---|
| 6 | One Flew Over the Cuckoo's Nest |
| 5 | Bugsy Malone |
| 3 | Taxi Driver |

== See also ==
- 49th Academy Awards
- 2nd César Awards
- 29th Directors Guild of America Awards
- 34th Golden Globe Awards
- 3rd Saturn Awards
- 29th Writers Guild of America Awards
