= Jill Taylor =

Jill Taylor may refer to:

- Jill Taylor (costume designer) (born 1957), costume designer for film
- Jill Taylor (Home Improvement), a character in the TV sitcom Home Improvement
- Jill Taylor (model) (born 1951), Playboy model
- Jill Bolte Taylor (born 1959), neuroanatomist and author
