= Arabesque (film) =

1966 American comedy film by Stanley Donen

- Theatrical release poster by Robert McGinnis
- Directed by: Stanley Donen
- Screenplay by: Julian Mitchell; Stanley Price; Peter Stone (Note: Credited as Pierre Marton)
- Based on: The Cipher by Alex Gordon
- Produced by: Stanley Donen
- Starring: Gregory Peck; Sophia Loren; Alan Badel; Kieron Moore
- Cinematography: Christopher Challis
- Edited by: Frederick Wilson
- Music by: Henry Mancini
- Production company: Stanley Donen Enterprises
- Distributed by: Universal Pictures
- Release dates: May 5, 1966 (New York City); May 24, 1966 (United States)
- Running time: 105 minutes
- Country: United States
- Language: English
- Budget: $4.8 million
- Box office: $5 million (U.S. and Canada rentals)

Arabesque is a 1966 American spy comedy thriller film produced and directed by Stanley Donen and starring Gregory Peck and Sophia Loren. The screenplay by Julian Mitchell, Stanley Price, and Peter Stone is based on the 1961 novel The Cipher by Alex Gordon (pseudonym of Gordon Cotler). The film, along with Donen's immediately prior film Charade (1963), is usually described as being "Hitchcockian". It features as a protagonist an innocent and ordinary man thrust into dangerous and extraordinary situations. It was the last film of that genre which Donen would make.

Arabesque was filmed in Technicolor and Panavision and was distributed by Universal Pictures.

== Plot ==
Major Sloane murders Professor Ragheeb, an expert in ancient hieroglyphs at Oxford University, and steals a hieroglyph-encrypted message. Sloane then asks American professor David Pollock, who has taken over Ragheeb's class, to meet with shipping magnate Nejim Beshraavi on a lucrative business matter, but David declines. He is later approached by Hassan Jena, the prime minister of a Middle Eastern country, and his ambassador to the United Kingdom, Mohammed Lufti. Jena convinces David to accept Beshraavi's proposition.

In Beshraavi's London mansion, he offers David $30,000 to decode Ragheeb's message. Beshraavi's girlfriend Yasmin Azir secretly warns David that Beshraavi had Ragheeb killed and plans to do the same to David once he deciphers it. David hides the cipher inside a candy wrapper, placing it into a bag of candies, and pretends to hold Yasmin at knifepoint, allowing them to flee the mansion. As they seek refuge at a nearby zoological garden, David struggles with one of Beshraavi's henchmen, whom a man named Webster eventually kills. Webster then knocks David unconscious.

David awakes in a moving panel van with Webster, Yasmin, and another conspirator, Yussef Kassim, who are all after the cipher. David, seeing the bag of candies in the van, lies that Beshraavi has the cipher. Unable to extract any useful information from David, even after administering a truth serum, Webster and Yussef push him out of the van. Yussef tells Yasmin to double-cross Beshraavi.

The next morning, Yasmin tells Beshraavi that Yussef, for whom the cipher was originally intended, presumably killed David and the henchman without the message being decoded. Beshraavi deduces that David has the cipher. Yasmin later visits David, convincing him that she hates Yussef and merely pretends to help him because his boss Ali, an Arab general who is orchestrating a military takeover, is holding her mother and sisters hostage. Yasmin urges David to solve the cipher so she can report back to the embassy, which will ensure their safety.

David and Yasmin go to the construction site that Yussef uses as his front, where Webster finds the bag of candies in the van and eventually discovers the cipher. The pair then learn that Webster plans to meet with Beshraavi at Ascot Racecourse to betray Yussef. At Ascot, Yasmin is with Beshraavi while David spots Webster making a transaction with Sloane, who hands over an envelope of money. When David knocks the cipher out of Webster's hand, Sloane attempts to stab David, accidentally killing Webster.

Newspaper headlines implicate David as Webster's killer. David visits Mrs. Ragheeb, asking her about the cipher and informing her of her husband's murder. Mrs. Ragheeb reveals that Yasmin has no mother or sisters, and that Ali is actually her father. That night, David lies to Yasmin that he does not have the cipher but claims he has decoded the message, fabricating a nonsensical translation. Later, David follows Yasmin to Yussef's construction site where Yussef, who is operating a wrecking ball, attempts to kill Yasmin. David rushes to her aid and causes Yussef to be electrocuted by a live wire.

The hieroglyphs turn out to be a nursery rhyme. (Note: More specifically, "Goosey Goosey Gander".) After David gets the note wet, the ink washes away, leaving a microdot. It reads "Beshraavi plans assassinate Jena twelve thirty June eighteenth", which is in twenty minutes. Shortly after Jena lands at the airport for his press conference, David shoves past a group of security guards and knocks Jena onto the ground, saving him from being shot by Sloane. Lufti then kills Jena with a pistol. However, the man who was shot turns out to be an imposter.

The real Jena has been abducted by Beshraavi and locked in the back of a truck. David and Yasmin hide in the truck and free Jena as the van arrives at Beshraavi's country estate. David, Yasmin, and Jena escape on horseback from his stables while being pursued through crop fields by a combine harvester with blades. Beshraavi and Sloane approach them in a helicopter. While crossing the disused Crumlin Viaduct, David drops a ladder into the helicopter's rotors as Beshraavi and Sloane pass underneath, causing them to crash and burn. Back at Oxford, David and Yasmin enjoy a romantic boat ride together.

== Cast ==
- Gregory Peck as Prof. David Pollock
- Sophia Loren as Yasmin Azir
- Alan Badel as Nejim Beshraavi
- Kieron Moore as Yussef Kasim
- Carl Duering as Prime Minister Hassan Jena
- John Merivale as Maj. Sylvester Pennington Sloane
- Duncan Lamont as Kyle Webster
- George Coulouris as Ragheeb
- Ernest Clark as Beauchamp
- Harold Kasket as Mohammed Lufti
- Gordon Griffin as Fanshaw (uncredited)

== Production ==
The original working title for the film was "Crisscross", which was later changed to "Cipher" before becoming Arabesque.

Producer/director Stanley Donen wanted Cary Grant for the role of Pollock after working with him in his previous film Charade, and the dialogue for Pollock was written with Grant in mind. However, Donen was later quoted as saying,

[Grant] didn't want to be in it ... It wasn't a good script and I didn't want to make it, but Gregory Peck and Sophia Loren, whom I loved, wanted to be in it and the studio implored me to make it, because, they said, 'It's ridiculous not to make a film with Peck and Sophia.' They said it would make money, and they were right.

Donen later estimated that $400,000 was spent on the script alone and cinematographer Christopher Challis recalled that the film went through several rewrites. Challis said that "The more the script was rewritten, the worse it got." With Peck and Loren already contracted to do the film, Challis recalled that Donen told him "Our only hope is to make it so visually exciting the audience will never have time to work out what the hell is going on".

Peter Stone, who was brought in very late to make improvements in the dialogue, said that Donen "shot it better than he ever shot any picture. Everything was shot as though it were a reflection in a Rolls-Royce headlamp." Donen described his technique in shooting the film:

I had hoped to avoid any sign of the studio manner this time, so I tried something like the "living camera" technique. The hand-held camera had been used a lot lately, especially in Europe, but the trouble had been too much wobble because the operator has to carry the sheer weight of the camera while he's working. One of our boys had the idea of suspending the camera ... to give the operator all the mobility of the hand camera without the weight ... Arabesque is sort of going to the extreme until it almost makes you sick. Granted, we did do some interesting photographic things.

Peck said about Donen that

Stanley had a terrific instinct, like a choreographer, which, of course, he had been. (Note: Donen had started his film career as the co-director and co-choreographer of Gene Kelly, with whom he had worked on Broadway.) But even in an ordinary dramatic sequence he'd use the body to punctuate what was happening — standing, relaxing, everything, it was all choreographed. If you look at the picture, we were always moving, because Stanley just wanted to keep the ball in the air the entire time, and he used every camera trick you could think of. He also loved filming Sophia's decolletage and her rear end.

As with Donen's Charade, Henry Mancini composed the score and Maurice Binder designed the main titles.

Sophia Loren's request for 20 different pairs of shoes for her character led to her lover in the film being described as having a foot fetish. In a chase scene, Peck, who had been injured years earlier in a horse-riding accident, could not run fast enough to keep up with Loren, who kept pulling ahead. Peck implored his co-star to run slower, reminding her that he was supposed to be rescuing her, but Loren asked Donen to make Peck run faster. Since Peck was in pain, Donen had to persuade Loren to run slower to make filming the scene possible.

Many internal and external scenes were shot at Tyringham Hall in Buckinghamshire. At the time the building was a disaster recovery site owned by the ANZ Banking Group and was largely unused and unfurnished. The railway bridge action scene was filmed on the historic Crumlin Viaduct in Crumlin, Caerphilly, which was being dismantled at the time.

Loren's character drove a Mercedes-Benz 230SL. The Rolls-Royce Phantom IV which appears in the film was originally owned by Prince Henry, Duke of Gloucester - it is one of only eighteen Phantom IV examples ever built.

== Reception ==
=== Box office ===
By January 1967, Arabesque earned $5 million in distributor rentals from the United States and Canada.

=== Critical reaction ===
Whitney Williams of Variety wrote, "Arabesque packs certain salable ingredients, such as the names of Gregory Peck and Sophia Loren and a foreign intrigue theme which fits into the current cycle, but doesn't always progress on a true entertainment course. Fault lies in a shadowy plot line and confusing characters, particularly in the miscasting of Peck in a cute role." Philip K. Scheuer of the Los Angeles Times felt: "Despite all the optical mumbo-jumbo, however, Donen still doesn't seem able to differentiate between what is fodder for humor and what isn't--and let's face it, Gregory Peck is no comedian." Brendan Gill of The New Yorker wrote: "Mr. Peck is, as always, handsome, and Miss Loren is, as always, beautiful, while the millionaire, played by Alan Badel, snarls and threatens with the requisite authority, but there my compliments come to an end [...] Mr. Donen is awfully coy about the extent of Miss Loren's nakedness and can do nothing to conceal Mr. Peck's professional discomfiture at finding himself in such a situation."

Clifford Terry for The Chicago Tribune wrote a mixed review, stating, "The picture is admittedly handsome, with expensive costuming competing with glittering locales, but Director Stanley Donen seems more concerned with camera than story angles, as he creates blurry and distorted montages by shooting thru mirrors, chandeliers, and even sunglasses." Time magazine similarly observed: "To mask weaknesses and justify the movie's title, Donen puts his camera to a series of Olympian trials, filming at dizzying angles through, under, or into the reflections of sunglasses, grillwork, optical tools, windshields, mirrors, table tops, television screens and the chromium trim of a Rolls-Royce."

Grace Glueck of The New York Times wrote, "Arabesque provides those, all right—Op photography, lush décor, gimmicky locations and hair-raising pursuits. And, of course, Sophia Loren, a stunning bit of animated scenery who is not called upon to act but to Dior. She manages to accomplish this seductively, both in and out of a series of lavish costumes and through such tribulations as murder, boudoir scenes with a fetishist lover, and pursuit, in a construction pit, by a steel wrecking ball." Wanda Hale of the New York Daily News praised the film and wrote "Arabesque is the spoofingest spoof yet on espionage adventure with a handsome pair you'd least expect to take part in the wild, wonderful nonsense—Gregory Peck and Sophia Loren. The dignified Peck and the elegant Loren let themselves go on a mad, mirthful spree to amaze and amuse appreciative audiences." Boxoffice Magazine called it "a spy adventure par excellence" and wrote that it was "in the best Alfred Hitchcock vein and ranks among the year's best."

On the review aggregator website Rotten Tomatoes, 78% of 55 critics' reviews are positive. The website's consensus reads: "Slickly made and effortlessly charming, Arabesque favors cinematic flair and star power over substance, resulting in an enjoyably lightweight thriller."

=== Accolades ===
Award	Category	Recipient	Result
BAFTA Film Awards	Best Cinematography	Christopher Challis	Won
BAFTA Film Awards	Best Costume Design	Christian Dior	Nominated
BAFTA Film Awards	Best Editing	Frederick Wilson	Nominated
Bambi Award	Best Actress	Sophia Loren	Won
Grammy Award	Best Original Score Written for a Motion Picture or Television Show	Henry Mancini	Nominated
Laurel Award	Best Action Sequence	Gregory Peck	5th Place

== See also ==
- List of American films of 1966

== Bibliography ==
- Harris, Warren G. (1998). Sophia Loren: A Biography. Simon & Schuster. ISBN 978-0-684-80273-2.
- Silverman, Stephen M. (1996). Dancing On the Ceiling: Stanley Donen and His Movies. Alfred P. Knopf. ISBN 0-679-41412-6.
