= Monica Howe =

British costume designer

Monica Howe is a British costume designer. She received nominations for two BAFTA Awards. Her career includes social realist and literary adaptations for both TV and cinema releases from 1974–2000.

== Career ==
Howe's first film costume design project was Bugsy Malone, a musical about American gangsters featuring only child actors, directed by Alan Parker. The costumes for Bugsy Malone were nominated for a BAFTA Best Costume Design award, and several were later acquired by the BFI for the Museum of the Moving Image on the South Bank in London.

The actors in the film had an average of twelve, which gave an added complexity to the costume design. Press at the time recorded, "Howe and her army of helpers had to supply nearly 500 cut-down but absolutely authentic 1920s costumes". Despite the ages of the performers, the filmmakers wanted to make the film as "uncompromised as possible - the cars, the spurge-guns, the clothes", according to Executive Producer David Puttnam. Bespoke costume for principal cast were made by theatrical costumiers Wallace & McMurray.

For the film Breaking Glass (1980), Monica Howe worked with co-designer Lorna Hillyard to dress actor Hazel O'Connor as Kate, a pop star in the dystopian late 1970s music industry. The film historian Claire Monk has observed that the designers, "excel in providing Kate with a succession of on- and off-stage looks which draw credibly on new wave trends (from Gary Numan to Blondie) while expressing her transformation to glossy product".

The following year, Howe designed costumes for The BBC television adaptation of D H Lawrence's The Trespasser (1981). A decade later, she costumed another literary adaption, E M Forster's Where Angels Fear to Tread (1991), starring Helena Bonham Carter and Helen Mirren.

In 1983, Howe did the costumes for ‘Tales Out of School’, a series of four films about contemporary England, education and unemployment, written for television by David Leland, and shown on ITV: The Birth of a Nation (directed by Mike Newell); Flying into the Wind; RHINO; and Made in Britain. In the last of the four, Howe dressed actor Tim Roth in his breakout role as a young skinhead.

Monica Howe had a long-standing collaboration with the director Terence Davies. Her first project with Davies was designing costumes for Distant Voices, Still Lives, an acclaimed period film that is a "highly stylised" vision of the 1950s. Later collaborations with the director included The Long Day Closes; The Neon Bible and The House of Mirth. Davies's biographer, Monica Everett, explained that Monica Howe was chosen for her considerable skill and experience, and also the ‘affinities’ with Davies, having grown up around the same time. Davies himself described Howe as "a costume designer of genius".

Howe's final film credit was for The House of Mirth (2000), the Terence Davies-directed adaptation of Edith Wharton’s story of hypocrisy and predatory practices in Old New York. Howe's costumes achieved widespread acclaim from contemporary critics. The Denver Post wrote: "Wearing costume designer Monica Howe's gorgeously outsized hats (you could sit in one!) and tapered outfits, [actor Gillian] Anderson looks as if she's an elegant artwork". And they have remained popular among fans of period costuming: "mournful veils, gauzy flounces, and apparitions of blood-red eveningwear indicate a more theatrical understanding of social mores", or simply described as "gorgeous". In academic critique, Howe's costumes have been described as a "remarkable" translation of historic fashion to film.

== Awards and nominations ==
Award	Year	Category	Work	Result	Ref.
British Academy Film Awards	1977	Best Costume Design	Bugsy Malone	Nominated	
British Academy Film Awards	2001	Best Costume Design	The House of Mirth	Nominated	
Satellite Awards	2001	Best Costume Design	The House of Mirth	Nominated	
