= 20th British Academy Film Awards =

1967 film awards ceremony

- Date: 27 April 1967

Highlights
- Best Film: Who's Afraid of Virginia Woolf?
- Best British Film: The Spy Who Came in from the Cold
- Most awards: The Spy Who Came in from the Cold (4)
- Most nominations: Alfie, Morgan – A Suitable Case for Treatment, and The Spy Who Came in from the Cold (6)

The 20th British Academy Film Awards, given by the British Academy of Film and Television Arts on 27 April 1967, honoured the best films of 1966.

== Winners and nominees ==
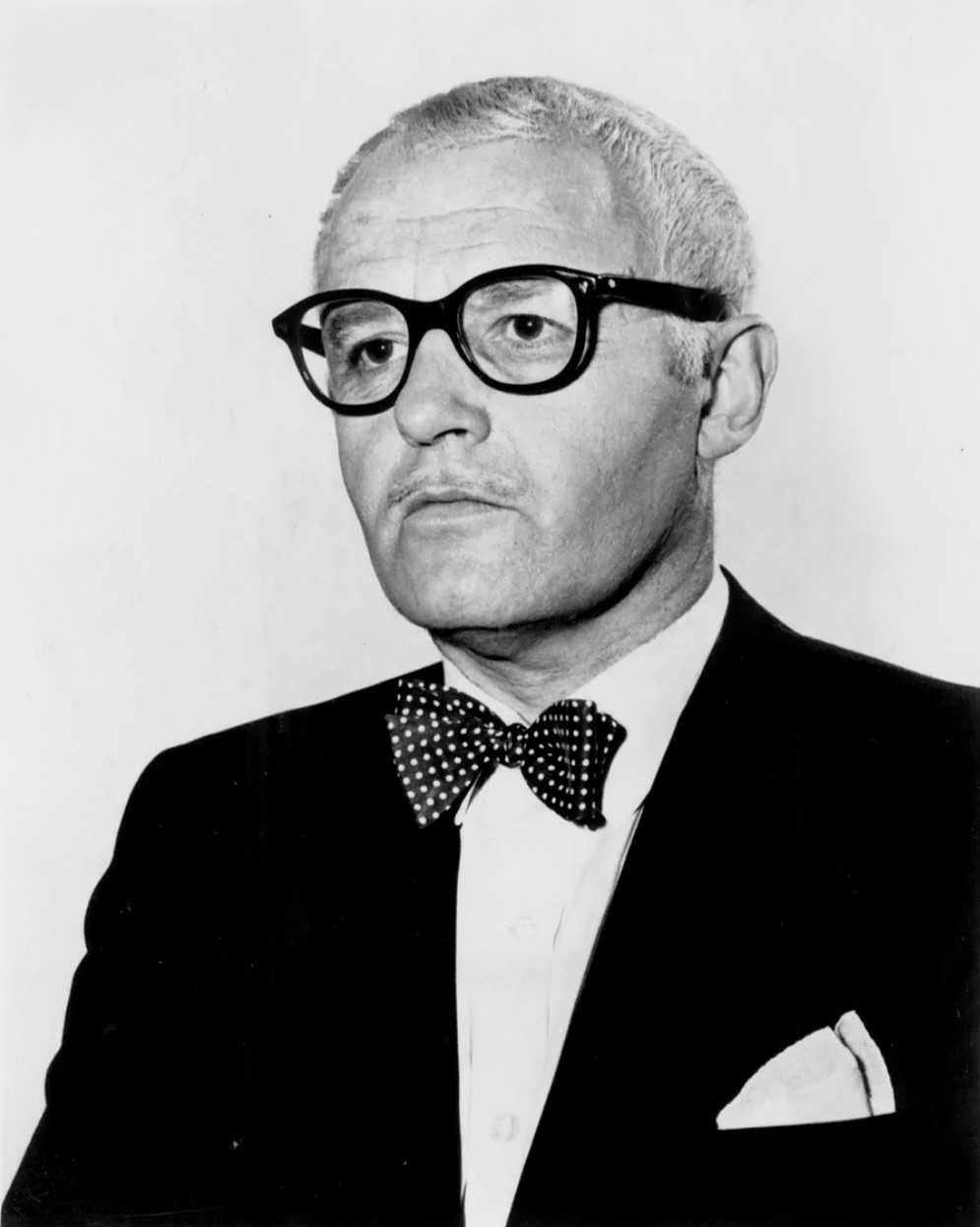
Rod Steiger, Best Foreign Actor winner

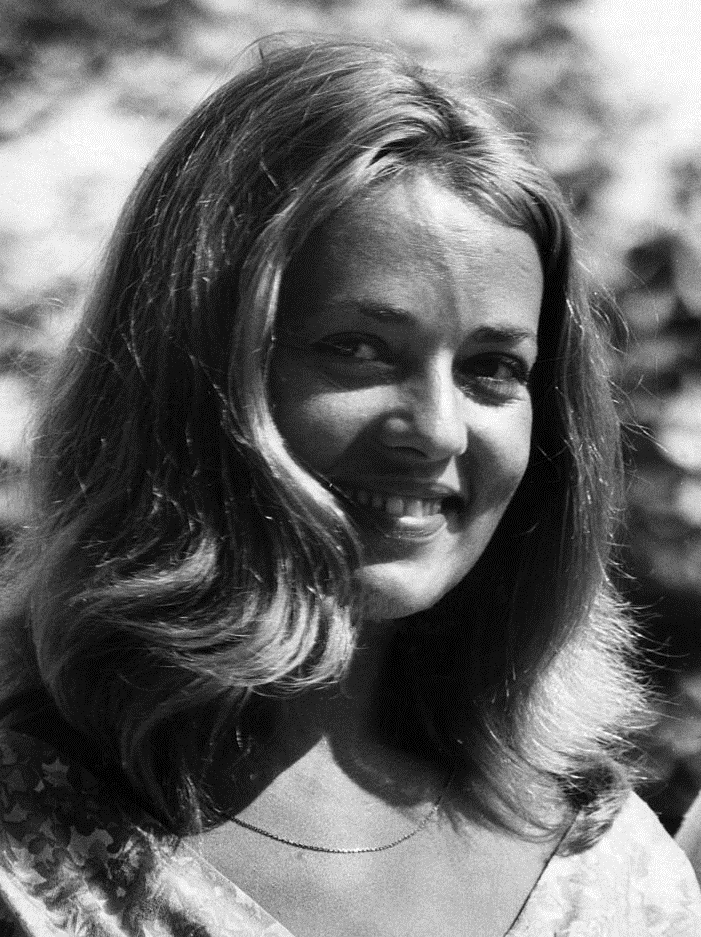
Jeanne Moreau, Best Foreign Actress winner

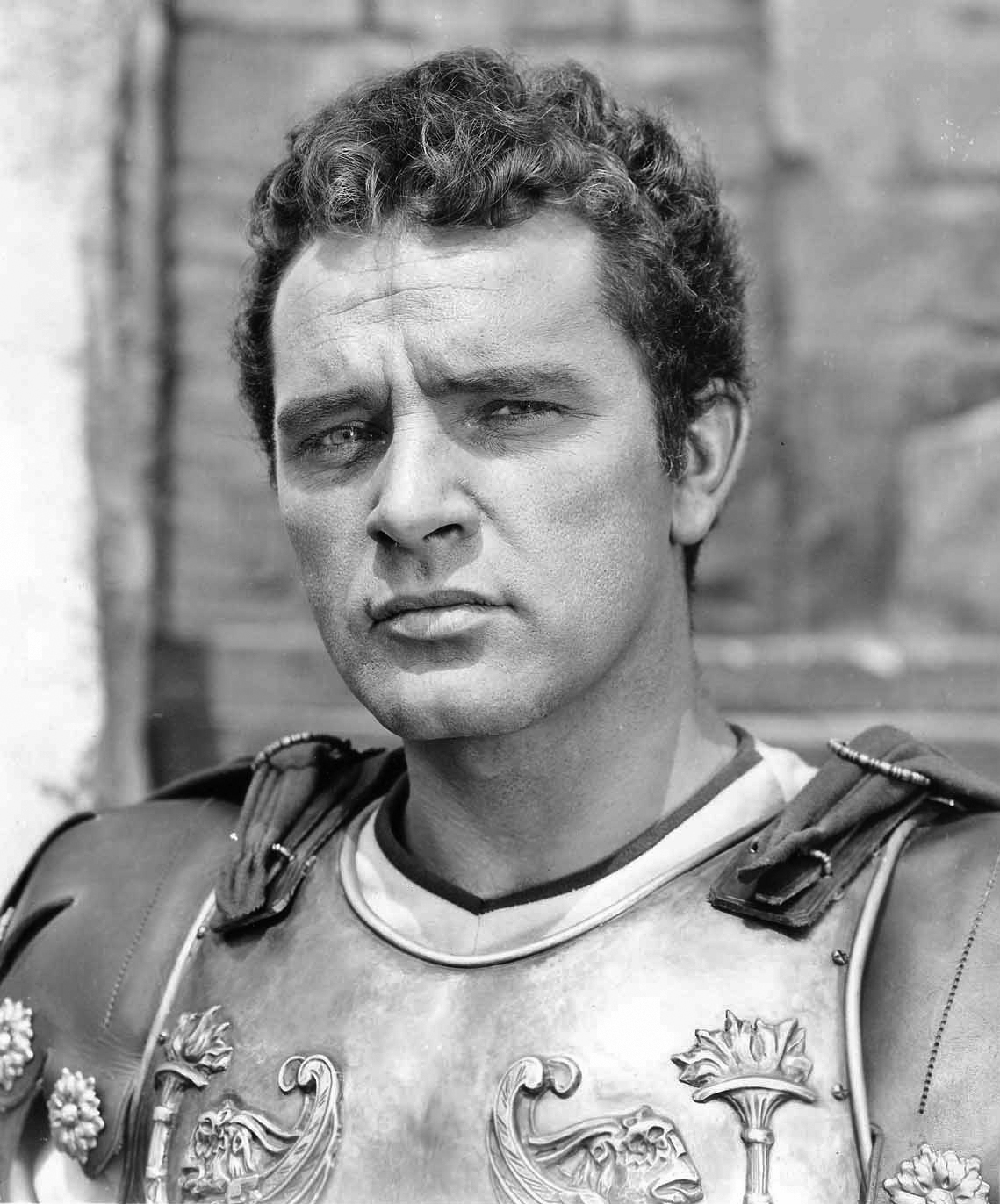
Richard Burton, Best British Actor winner

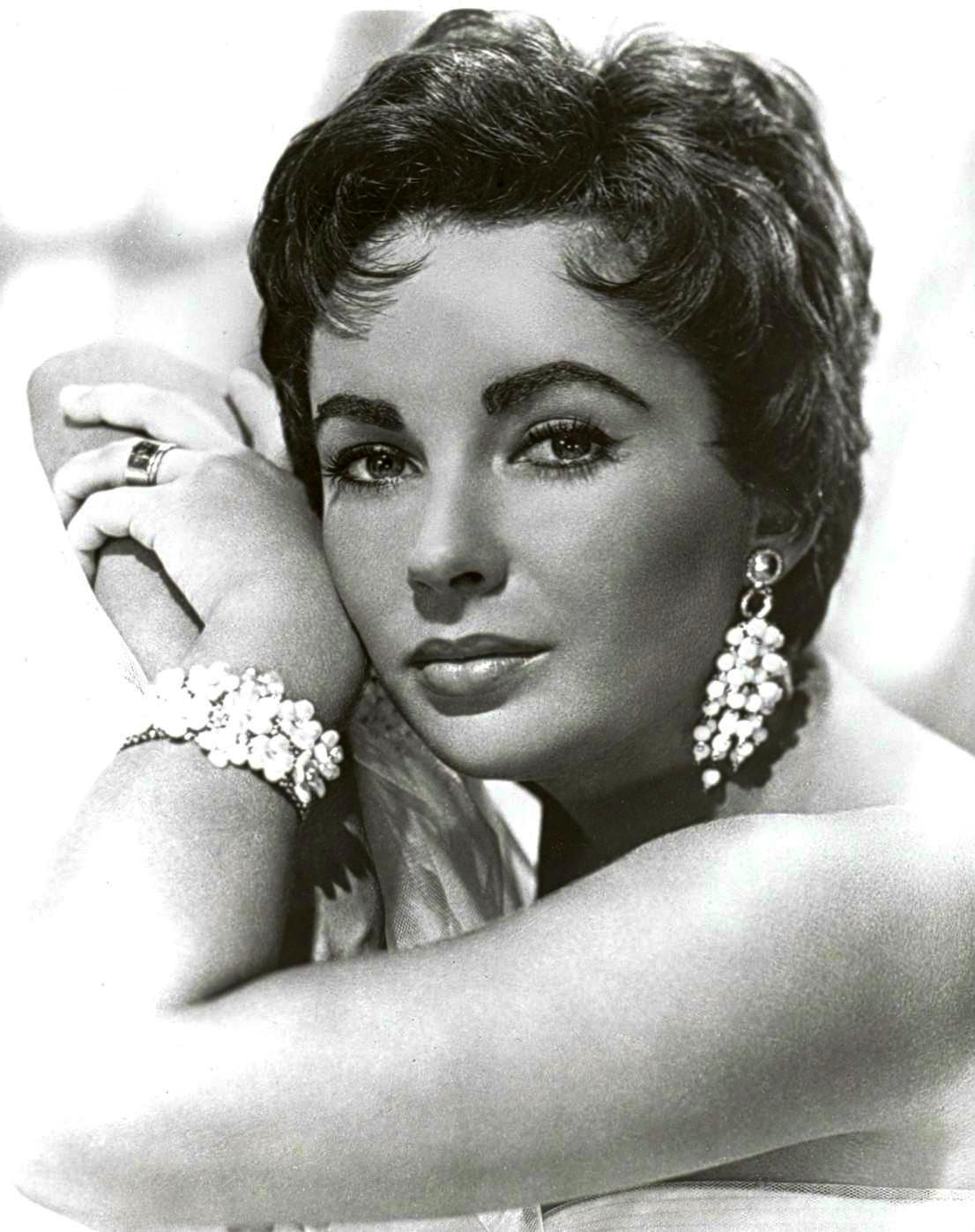
Elizabeth Taylor, Best British Actress winner

Best Film Who's Afraid of Virginia Woolf? – Mike Nichols: Doctor Zhivago – David Lean; Morgan – A Suitable Case for Treatment – Karel Reisz; The Spy Who Came In from the Cold – Martin Ritt	Best Documentary Goal! The World Cup – Abidine Dino and Ross Devenish: Buster Keaton Rides Again – John Spotton; I'm Going to Ask You to Get Up Out of Your Seat – Richard Cawston; Matadar – Kevin Billington
Best Short Film The War Game – Peter Watkins: A River Must Live – Alan Pendry; Sudden Summer – Richard Taylor; The Tortoise and the Hare – Hugh Hudson	Best Specialised Film Exploring Chemistry – Robert Parker: The Radio Sky – Michael Crisfield; Visual Aids – Richard Need
Best Foreign Actor Rod Steiger – The Pawnbroker as Sol Nazerman: Jean-Paul Belmondo – Pierrot le Fou as Ferdinand Griffon; Oskar Werner – The Spy Who Came In from the Cold as Fiedler; Sidney Poitier – A Patch of Blue as Gordon Ralfe	Best Foreign Actress Jeanne Moreau – Viva Maria! as Maria I: Brigitte Bardot – Viva Maria! as Marie Fitzgerald O'Malley; Joan Hackett – The Group as Dottie Renfrew Latham; Simone Signoret – The Sleeping Car Murders as Eliane Darres
Best British Actor Richard Burton – The Spy Who Came In from the Cold as Alec Leamas; Richard Burton – Who's Afraid of Virginia Woolf? as George: David Warner – Morgan – A Suitable Case for Treatment as Morgan Delt; Michael Caine – Alfie as Alfie Elkins; Ralph Richardson – Doctor Zhivago as Alexander Maximovich Gromeko; Ralph Richardson – Khartoum as William Ewart Gladstone; Ralph Richardson – The Wrong Box as Joseph Finsbury	Best British Actress Elizabeth Taylor – Who's Afraid of Virginia Woolf? as Martha: Julie Christie – Doctor Zhivago as Lara Antipova; Julie Christie – Fahrenheit 451 as Linda Montag/Clarrisse; Lynn Redgrave – Georgy Girl as Georgina Parkin; Vanessa Redgrave – Morgan – A Suitable Case for Treatment as Leonie Delt
Best British Film The Spy Who Came In from the Cold – Martin Ritt: Alfie – Lewis Gilbert; Georgy Girl – Silvio Narizzano; Morgan – A Suitable Case for Treatment – Karel Reisz	Best British Screenplay Morgan – A Suitable Case for Treatment – David Mercer: Alfie – Bill Naughton; It Happened Here – Kevin Brownlow and Andrew Mollo; The Quiller Memorandum – Harold Pinter
Best British Art Direction, Black and White The Spy Who Came In from the Cold – Tambi Larsen: Bunny Lake Is Missing – Donald M. Ashton; Georgy Girl – Tony Woollard; Life at the Top – Ted Marshall	Best British Art Direction, Colour The Blue Max – Wilfred Shingleton: Khartoum – John Howell; The Quiller Memorandum – Maurice Carter; The Wrong Box – Ray Simm
Best British Cinematography, Black and White The Spy Who Came In from the Cold – Oswald Morris: Bunny Lake Is Missing – Denys Coop; Cul-de-sac – Gilbert Taylor; Georgy Girl – Kenneth Higgins	Best British Cinematography, Colour Arabesque – Christopher Challis: Alfie – Otto Heller; The Blue Max – Douglas Slocombe; Modesty Blaise – Jack Hildyard
Best British Costume Design The Wrong Box – Julie Harris: Arabesque – Christian Dior; The Blue Max – John Furniss; Romeo and Juliet – Nicholas Georgiadis	Best Editing Morgan – A Suitable Case for Treatment – Tom Priestley: Alfie – Thelma Connell; Arabesque – Freddie Wilson; The Quiller Memorandum – Freddie Wilson
Most Promising Newcomer to Leading Film Roles Vivien Merchant – Alfie as Lily Clamacraft: Alan Arkin – The Russians Are Coming the Russians Are Coming as Yuri Rozanov; Frank Finlay – Othello as Iago; Jeremy Kemp – The Blue Max as Leutnant Willi Von Klugermann	United Nations Award The War Game – Peter Watkins: The Pawnbroker – Sidney Lumet; The Russians Are Coming the Russians Are Coming – Norman Jewison; Vietnam – People and War – Jo Menell

== Statistics ==
Films that received multiple nominations
Nominations	Film
6	Alfie
6	Morgan – A Suitable Case for Treatment
6	The Spy Who Came In from the Cold
4	The Blue Max
4	Georgy Girl
3	Arabesque
3	Doctor Zhivago
3	The Quiller Memorandum
3	Who's Afraid of Virginia Woolf?
3	The Wrong Box
2	Bunny Lake Is Missing
2	Khartoum
2	The Pawnbroker
2	The Russians Are Coming, the Russians Are Coming
2	Viva Maria!
2	The War Game

Films that received multiple awards
Awards	Film
4	The Spy Who Came In from the Cold
3	Who's Afraid of Virginia Woolf?
2	Morgan – A Suitable Case for Treatment
2	The War Game

== See also ==
- 39th Academy Awards
- 19th Directors Guild of America Awards
- 24th Golden Globe Awards
- 19th Writers Guild of America Awards
