= Tom Rand (costume designer) =

British costume designer

- Born: UK
- Occupation: Costume designer
- Years active: 1976–present

Tom Rand is a British costume designer. He received nominations for an Academy Award and two BAFTA Awards.

== Filmography ==
Year	Title	Director	Notes
1977	The Duellists	Ridley Scott	
1981	The French Lieutenant's Woman	Karel Reisz	
1983	The Pirates of Penzance	Wilford Leach	
1985	The Shooting Party	Alan Bridges	
1985	Eleni	Peter Yates	
1988	Young Toscanini	Franco Zeffirelli	
1990	Strike It Rich	James Scott	
1992	The Power of One	John G. Avildsen	
1993	The Temp	Tom Holland	
1993	Heart of Darkness	Nicolas Roeg	Television film
1994	A Business Affair	Charlotte Brändström	
1994	Princess Caraboo	Michael Austin	
1995	Innocent Lies	Patrick Dewolf	
2002	The Count of Monte Cristo	Kevin Reynolds	

== Awards and nominations ==
Award	Year (Note: Indicates the year of ceremony. Each year is linked to the article about the awards held that year, wherever possible.)	Category	Work	Result	Ref.
Academy Awards	1982	Best Costume Design	The French Lieutenant's Woman	Nominated	
British Academy Film Awards	1979	Best Costume Design	The Duellists	Nominated	
British Academy Film Awards	1982	Best Costume Design	The French Lieutenant's Woman	Nominated	
Saturn Awards	1984	Best Costumes	The Pirates of Penzance	Nominated	
