= Gordon Griffin =

English actor, singer, and composer (born 1942)

Gordon Griffin MBE
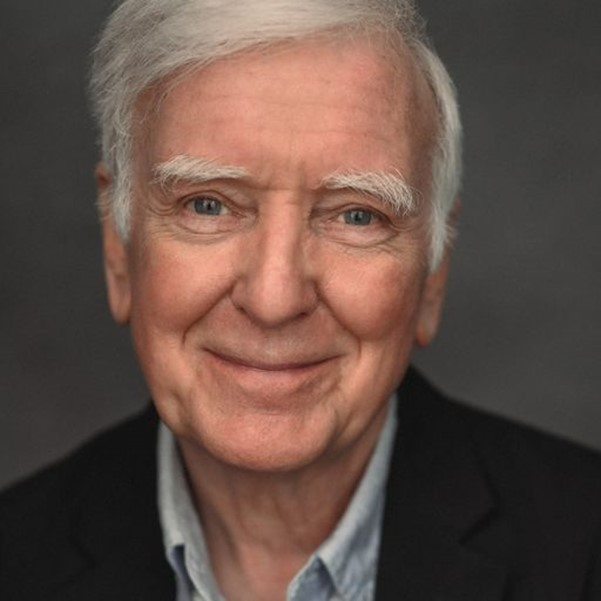
- Griffin in 2023
- Born: Gordon Cuthbert Griffin; 19 December 1942 (age 83); Gilsland, Northumberland, England
- Occupation: Actor
- Years active: 1963–present
- Website: www.gordongriffin.com

Gordon Cuthbert Griffin (born 19 December 1942) is an English actor, audiobook reader, casting director, dialogue coach, singer, composer and lyricist.

== Early life ==
Griffin comes from Newcastle-upon-Tyne, though he was actually born in Gilsland in Northumberland. He trained at Rose Bruford College.

== Career ==
As a stage actor, he has half a century's experience of working in theatres up and down the British Isles, and in English-speaking productions overseas. He took part in the first national tour of Godspell, and played in Julius Caesar and in Murder in the Cathedral at Chichester Festival Theatre. Other UK regional theatres where he has performed include Derby Playhouse and the Octagon Theatre, Bolton.

For twenty years he has been casting director for The English Theatre of Hamburg, and has cast over fifty plays, including The Importance of Being Earnest, Twelfth Night, As You Like It, Arms and the Man, Candida, Blithe Spirit, The Caretaker, Private Lives and The Circle, as well as the plays of LaBute and David Mamet.

As a cabaret singer, he has performed with his singing partner Francoise Geller in the UK and elsewhere. He has composed music and lyrics for productions such as The Circle, Educating Rita, When the Reaper Calls, Over the River, Through the Woods and April in Paris.

His first film job, in Arabesque, required him to play a scene with Gregory Peck and Sophia Loren.

On television, he has been a presenter on Play School, played Inky in two series of Chips' Comic for Channel 4, and spoke the first line in the first episode of Byker Grove.

Gordon has worked as a dialect coach on Byker Grove and Kavanagh QC.

Through doing radio drama, he realised that he could display great versatility with his voice alone, accessing a greater range of parts than would otherwise be possible: for example, in the late 1960s, when, well into his twenties, he took over the part of Billy, the eldest grandson in The Dales, formerly Mrs Dale's Diary.

He 'got in on the ground floor' when audiobooks started to be recorded. For many years he has been a voiceover specialist, and has recorded nearly a thousand audiobooks, mostly unabridged. The subjects have been as varied as Homer's Odyssey, George Orwell's Nineteen Eighty-Four and novels by H. G. Wells and Jules Verne, as well as more modern writers like Hilary Mantel and Melvyn Bragg. In addition, he has recorded many titles in the Golden Age of Murder series for the British Library, and non-fiction titles such as Elegy: The First Day on the Somme, and Breakfast is a Dangerous Meal by Terence Kealey, among many others. AudioFile Magazine wrote: "Griffin is not just a narrator, but an artist of the Spoken Word. He is in the top five of the most borrowed audiobook narrators in the world." In 2015-2016, his 2015 reading of The Death Season by Kate Ellis was the sixth most borrowed adult audiobook from UK public libraries, as reported by the Public Lending Right office.

His more unusual audio recordings include having been the courteous voice advising alighting passengers to "Mind the gap, please" on the London Underground.

In 2017, Gordon was appointed MBE in the Queen's Birthday Honours List "For services to People with Sight Impairment".

In 2020, Griffin published his memoir, Speaking Volumes.

== Selected screen credits ==
- Fanshawe in Arabesque
- Len in Doctor in the House
- Dr Ericson (lead) in Tableau of Love
- Sam in Doomwatch
- Alistair in Apocalypse Watch
- Vicar (lead) in The Gingerbread House
- John Major in Westminster on Trial
- Mr Flanders in The Fragile Heart
- Michael Warner in Byker Grove (7 episodes)
- Francy Nolan in When the Boat Comes In
- Cyril Collier in The Likely Lads
- Doug in A Family at War
