= Phyllis Dalton =

English costume designer (1925–2025)

Phyllis Dalton MBE
- in 1967
- Born: Phyllis Margaret Dalton; 16 October 1925; Chiswick, Middlesex, England
- Died: 9 January 2025 (aged 99); Somerset, England
- Occupation: Costume designer
- Years active: 1951–1993
- Spouses: James Whiteley (m. 1969; div. 1976); Christopher Synge Barton

Phyllis Margaret Dalton MBE (16 October 1925 – 9 January 2025) was an English costume designer. Her accolades include two Academy Awards, a British Academy Film Award, an Emmy Award, and she has also received the BAFTA Special Award for Craft.

Dalton collaborated with directors David Lean, Carol Reed, Rob Reiner, and Kenneth Branagh. She received three nominations for the Academy Award for Best Costume Design, and won twice for Doctor Zhivago (1965) and Henry V (1989). She was also nominated for the BAFTA Award for Best Costume Design four times, winning for The Hireling (1973).

== Life and career ==
=== Early years ===
Dalton was born in Chiswick on 16 October 1925. As a teenager she studied at the Ealing School of Art. After the outbreak of World War II she began training as a Wren at the code-breaking facility Bletchley Park which she said she found to be "unbelievably boring".

=== Career ===
In 1946, after being "demobbed" her grandmother entered her into a competition at Vogue Magazine where she won the opportunity to work as an assistant in the wardrobe department at Gainsborough Studios in Islington. Once there, she began cutting her teeth on films like Brian Desmond Hurst's A Christmas Carol; Alfred Hitchcock's The Man Who Knew Too Much and on Anatole Litvak's Anastasia.

Dalton gained notoriety as a costumer in the latter part of the 1950s, making a name for herself on films like Island in the Sun (1957), directed by Robert Rossen, starring James Mason and Joan Fontaine; and Our Man in Havana (1959), directed by Carol Reed, starring Alec Guinness and Noël Coward.

She worked with David Lean on the films: Lawrence of Arabia in 1962, starring Peter O'Toole and Omar Sharif; and again three years later on Dr. Zhivago starring Sharif and Julie Christie, for which she won her first Academy Award. For this particular film, Dalton and her team ended up making 3,000 individual costumes and putting together 35,000 individual items of clothing for the extras. The characters of Zhivago (Sharif) and Lara (Christie) each had approximately 90 costume combinations, and the other six other principal characters had an average of fifteen costume changes each. Because this was before CGI, by the time principal photography ended it was estimated the costume dept. had used up a total of 984 yards of fabric, 300,000 yards of thread, 1 million buttons and 7,000 safety pins.

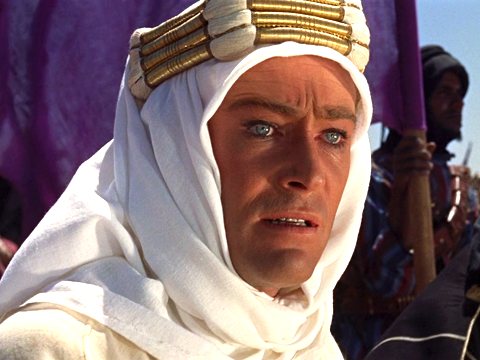
Peter O'Toole in one of Dalton's costumes for Lawrence: the sheikh's white robes and keffiyeh given to him by Sherif Ali. Lawrence of Arabia (1962)

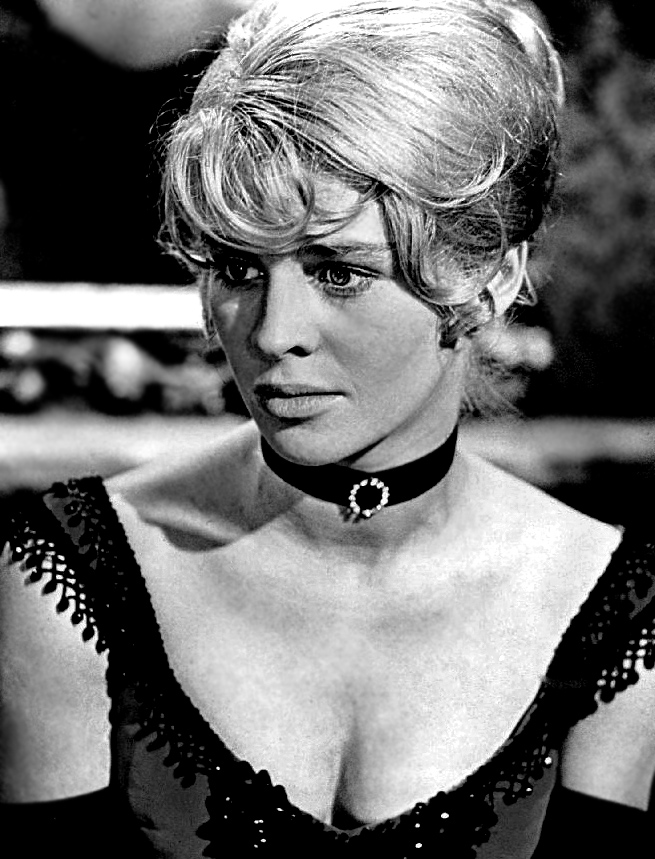
Julie Christie in one of Dalton's designs for Dr. Zhivago (1965)

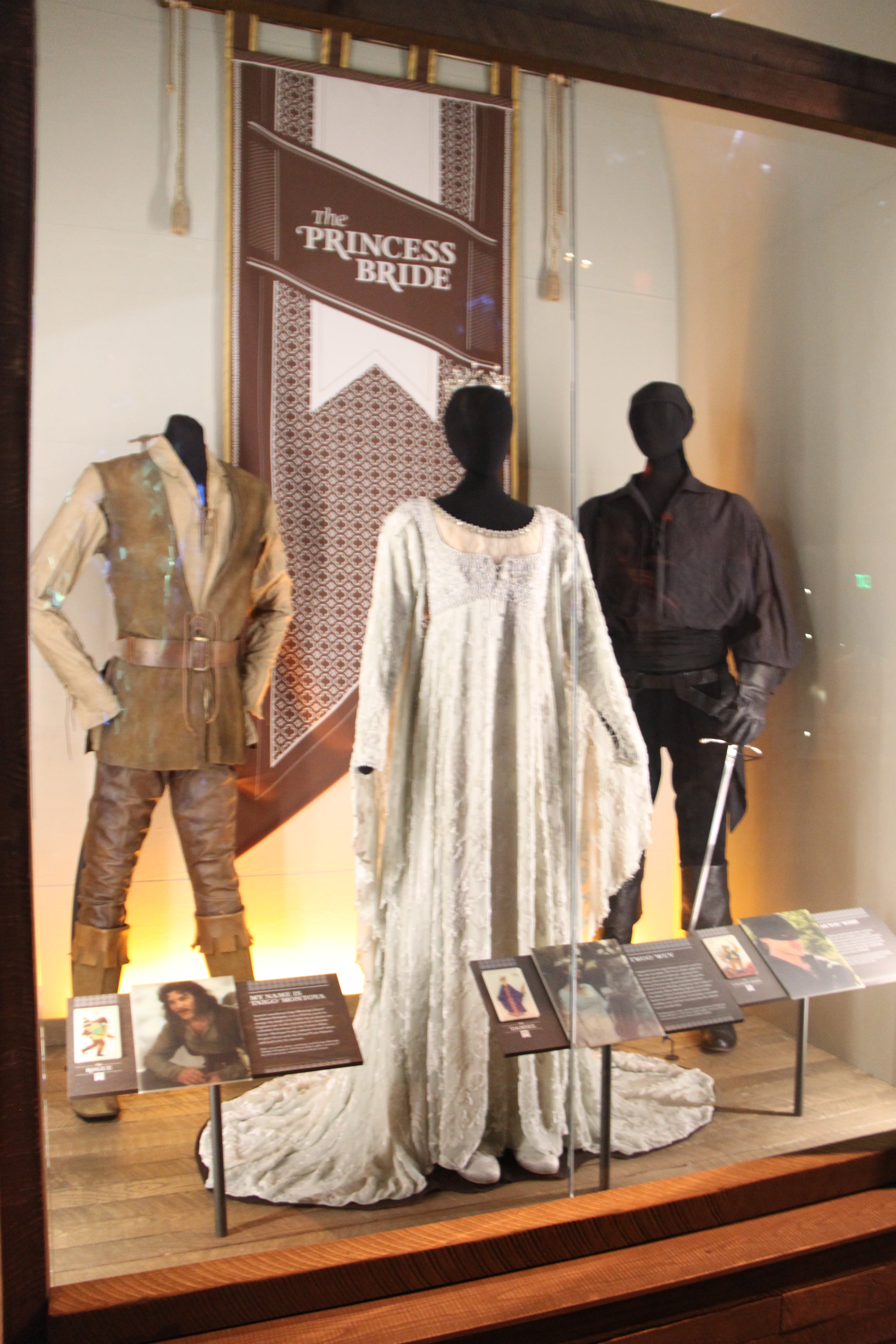
Dalton's costumes for Montoya, Buttercup and Westley for The Princess Bride (1987) on display at the EMP Museum, Seattle

In all, Dalton has designed costumes for more than forty films. Other notable ones include Lord Jim (1965) again with O'Toole and directed by Richard Brooks, Oliver! (1968) with Ron Moody and Oliver Reed directed by Carol Reed; and The Princess Bride (1987) directed by Rob Reiner with Cary Elwes and Robin Wright. Other wearers of her creations include Elizabeth Taylor, Kim Novak, Maggie Smith, Emma Thompson, Robin Williams, Keanu Reeves, Denzel Washington and Michael Palin.

Her body of work also includes Rob Roy: The Highland Rogue (1953), John Paul Jones (1959), The World of Suzie Wong (1960), The Message and Voyage of the Damned (both 1976), The Mirror Crack'd and The Awakening (both 1980), A Private Function (1984), and her last credited work, Much Ado About Nothing (1993).

A BAFTA tribute was held in 2012 to celebrate Dalton's contribution to British cinema.

=== Personal life and death ===
Dalton was married twice; in 1969 she married theatre producer James Whiteley, and they divorced in 1976. She then married Christopher Synge Barton, and became a stepmother to his son. Dalton lived in Somerset and died at home on 9 January 2025, at the age of 99.

== Filmography ==
=== Film ===
Year	Title	Director	Notes
1951	The Dark Man	Jeffrey Dell	
1953	Rob Roy: The Highland Rogue	Harold French	
1955	Passage Home	Roy Ward Baker	
1956	Zarak	Terence Young	
1957	Island in the Sun	Robert Rossen	
1958	Carve Her Name with Pride	Lewis Gilbert	
1959	John Paul Jones	John Farrow	
1959	Our Man in Havana	Carol Reed	
1960	The World of Suzie Wong	Richard Quine	
1961	Fury at Smugglers' Bay	John Gilling	
1962	Lawrence of Arabia	David Lean	
1965	Lord Jim	Richard Brooks	
1965	Doctor Zhivago	David Lean	
1968	Oliver!	Carol Reed	
1970	Fragment of Fear	Richard C. Sarafian	
1973	The Hireling	Alan Bridges	
1976	The Message	Moustapha Akkad	
1976	Voyage of the Damned	Stuart Rosenberg	
1978	The Water Babies	Lionel Jeffries	
1979	Eagle's Wing	Anthony Harvey	
1980	The Awakening	Mike Newell	
1980	The Mirror Crack'd	Guy Hamilton	
1984	A Private Function	Malcolm Mowbray	
1987	The Princess Bride	Rob Reiner	
1988	Stealing Heaven	Clive Donner	
1989	Henry V	Kenneth Branagh	
1991	Dead Again	Kenneth Branagh	
1993	Much Ado About Nothing	Kenneth Branagh	

=== Television ===
Year	Title	Notes
1982	The Hunchback of Notre Dame	Television film
1982	The Scarlet Pimpernel	Television film
1985	Merlin and the Sword	Television film
1986	The Last Days of Patton	Television film
1990	The Plot to Kill Hitler	Television film

== Awards and honours ==
Dalton was appointed a Member of the Order of the British Empire (MBE) in the 2002 Birthday Honours for services to the film industry.

=== Awards and nominations ===
Award	Year (Note: Indicates the year of ceremony. Each year is linked to the article about the awards held that year, wherever possible.)	Category	Work	Result	Ref.
Academy Awards	1966	Best Costume Design – Color	Doctor Zhivago	Won	
Academy Awards	1969	Best Costume Design	Oliver!	Nominated	
Academy Awards	1990	Best Costume Design	Henry V	Won	
British Academy Film Awards	1969	Best Costume Design	Oliver!	Nominated	
British Academy Film Awards	1974	Best Costume Design	The Hireling	Won	
British Academy Film Awards	1990	Best Costume Design	Henry V	Nominated	
British Academy Film Awards	1994	Best Costume Design	Much Ado About Nothing	Nominated	
British Academy Film Awards	1994	BAFTA Special Award for Craft	—N/a	Honored	
Primetime Emmy Awards	1983	Outstanding Costume Design for a Limited Series or a Special	The Scarlet Pimpernel	Won	
Saturn Awards	1988	Best Costume Design	The Princess Bride	Won	

== See also ==
- List of Academy Award winners and nominees from Great Britain
