= Rob Roy: The Highland Rogue =

1953 film by Harold French

- Theatrical release poster
- Directed by: Harold French
- Written by: Lawrence Edward Watkin
- Produced by: Perce Pearce; Walt Disney
- Starring: Richard Todd; Glynis Johns; James Robertson Justice; Michael Gough; Finlay Currie; Geoffrey Keen
- Cinematography: Guy Green
- Edited by: Geoffrey Foot
- Music by: Cedric Thorpe Davie
- Production company: RKO-Walt Disney British Productions
- Distributed by: RKO Radio Pictures
- Release dates: 26 October 1953 (London); 27 February 1954 (United States)
- Running time: 81 minutes
- Countries: United Kingdom; United States
- Language: English
- Budget: $1.8 million
- Box office: $1,050,000

Rob Roy: The Highland Rogue is a 1953 adventure film produced by RKO-Walt Disney British Productions which is about Rob Roy MacGregor. It was the last Disney film released through RKO Radio Pictures.

== Plot ==
The film begins in the early 18th century with Rob Roy leading his McGregor clansmen against King George I's forces commanded by the Scottish Duke of Argyll.

While determined to establish order in the Highlands, Argyll is sympathetic to "the bonny blue bonnets" whom he is fighting, even refusing to unleash German mercenaries against them. A final charge by royal dragoons scatters the clansmen but honour appears satisfied and Rob Roy returns to his village to wed his beloved Helen.

The wedding celebrations are interrupted by fencibles – the private army of the Duke of Montrose who has been appointed as the King's Secretary of State for Scotland and who lacks Argyll's regard for the highlanders. All clans involved in the Jacobite rising of 1715 are pardoned except for the McGregors.

Rob Roy is arrested and the Clan McGregor is deprived of the right to use its name. Rob Roy escapes, leaping a waterfall and subsequently leads McGregor opposition to the increasingly repressive regime imposed by Montrose through his agent Killearn. During a skirmish with the fencibles McGregor's mother is killed. A fort is stormed by the clan and its garrison of royal soldiers taken prisoner.

The Duke of Argyll goes to King George to plead the case for leniency for the Clan McGregor, who have been forced into rebellion. Montrose urges repression.

At this crucial point, Rob Roy appears at the royal court, heralded by a piper. Rob Roy's self-evident qualities quickly convince the king to pardon him and his clan. After an exchange of compliments: "Rob Roy – you are a great rogue"; "and you sire are a great king", the McGregor returns to his people and his wife.

== Cast ==
- Richard Todd as Rob Roy MacGregor
- Glynis Johns as Helen Mary MacPherson MacGregor
- James Robertson Justice as John Campbell, 2nd Duke of Argyll.
- Michael Gough as Duke of Montrose
- Finlay Currie as Hamish MacPherson
- Jean Taylor Smith as Lady Margaret Campbell MacGregor, of Glengyll
- Geoffrey Keen as Killearn
- Archie Duncan as Dugal MacGregor
- Russell Waters as Hugh MacGregor
- Marjorie Fielding as Maggie MacPherson
- Eric Pohlmann as King George I
- Ina De La Haye as Countess von Pahlen
- Michael Goodliffe as Sir Robert Walpole
- Martin Boddey as General Cadogan
- Ewen Solon as Maj. Gen. Wightman
- Ian MacNaughton as Callum MacGregor
- Ted Follows as Douglas MacGregor
- May Hallatt as Ballad Hawker
- Hamilton Keene as Fort Commandant
- Henry Hewitt as Lord Parker
- Malcolm Keen as Duke of Marlborough
- David Keir as Servant to Argyll

== Production ==
=== Proposed Gainsborough versions ===
In 1938, Gainsborough Pictures announced plans to make a Rob Roy film starring Will Fyffe, Margaret Lockwood and Michael Redgrave directed by Carol Reed. Leslie Arliss and Curt Siodmak wrote a script. The film was postponed due to World War II. In 1945, J. Arthur Rank, who by then owned Gainsborough, announced that he would make a film of the story, and that Stewart Granger would star in it, but the film was not made.

=== Development ===
Disney had enjoyed success with its first live-action film, Treasure Island (1950), shot in England. He followed it up with two more costume adventure tales, The Story of Robin Hood and His Merrie Men and The Sword and the Rose, both directed by Ken Annakin and starring Richard Todd.

In September 1952, Disney announced that Todd would star in a film about Rob Roy immediately after Sword and the Rose and that the film would have a budget of approximately $1.8 million. The story would be based on "history and legend" rather than the novel by Sir Walter Scott. He was considering making a film about King Arthur afterwards. Another report said the script would be based on a book by Daniel Dafoe. When the Rank Organisation refused to loan director Ken Annakin out to Disney again, Disney chose Harold French (who had worked with Annakin on some Somerset Maugham portmanteau films) to direct the film. Rob Roy was filmed just as Sword and the Rose was released.

Actor Richard Todd's fee was £15,000. In a promotional interview for the film, he said that Roy "instituted the first protection racket". Glynis Johns was cast in March 1953. The other lead was James Robertson Justice, who had just made The Sword and the Rose with Johns and Todd.

Walt Disney liked history because, in his comment, "it's universal. Subjects like Robin Hood and the Tudors appeal to everyone. And costumes don't date, you know. I can release these films over and over again and they won't get the kind of laugh you get from modern subjects made ten years back". The costumes for Rob Roy were designed by British designer Phyllis Dalton, and supplied by the London costumiers Nathan's. They sourced thousands of yards of tartan from Alex Macnaughton, a weaver in Pitlochry.

=== Shooting ===
Studio scenes were shot at Elstree Studios.

Location filming took place in Scotland, including at Corriegrennan and Aberfoyle. Richard Todd related in his autobiography that the extras were soldiers of the Argyll and Sutherland Highlanders who had just returned from the Korean War. Todd also sheepishly admitted that his first scene (leading a charge) led to an injury when he stepped in a rabbit hole. As well as providing thrilling battle scenes for the viewers, the soldiers used the opportunity to enthusiastically get back at their non-commissioned officers. The soldiers only received their normal pay of seven shillings a day, whereas the War Office received 25 shillings a day. Questions about these payments were raised in the Parliament of the United Kingdom.

== Release ==
The film premiered during the Royal Command Performance Film Gala on 26 October 1953 at the Odeon Leicester Square in London. It was later released by Walt Disney Home Video through VHS on 19 October 1985.

== Reception ==
=== Critical ===
The New York Times critic Bosley Crowther described it as "a fine lot of fighting among the hills, shooting of rifles, banging of claymores, skirling of pipes and buzzing of burrs, filmed and recorded in color on the actual Scottish countryside. And while Mr. Todd is not precisely the Rob Roy that history records, he is indeed a satisfactory fabrication until a better Rob Roy comes along".

=== Box office ===
In June 1954, Walt Disney admitted that the box office returns of this and The Sword in the Rose were "not up to expectations" in the US, but they performed better in other countries and were expected to return their costs. He pulled back on making costume pictures as a result.

According to Kinematograph Weekly, the film was a "money maker" at the British box office in 1954.
