= John Furniss (costume designer) =

British costume designer (born 1935)

- Born: 1935 (age 90–91); London, England
- Other name: John Furness
- Occupation: Costume designer
- Years active: 1966–1978

John Furniss is a British costume designer. He received nominations for an Academy Award and two BAFTA Awards.

== Partial filmography ==
- International Velvet (1978)
- Wombling Free (1977)
- Escape from the Dark (1976)
- Paper Tiger (1975)
- Daisy Miller (1974) (as John Furness)
- Undercovers Hero (1974)
- A Doll's House (1973)
- England Made Me (1973)
- Endless Night (1972)
- Sleuth (1972)
- Cry of the Penguins (1971)
- The Go-Between (1970)
- The Kremlin Letter (1970)
- Those Daring Young Men in Their Jaunty Jalopies (1969)
- The Valley of Gwangi (1969)
- The Long Duel (1967)
- The Viking Queen (1967)
- The Blue Max (1966)
- Eye of the Devil (1966) (as John Furness)

== Awards and nominations ==
Award	Year (Note: Indicates the year of ceremony. Each year is linked to the article about the awards held that year, wherever possible.)	Category	Work	Result	Ref.
Academy Awards	1975	Best Costume Design	Daisy Miller	Nominated	
British Academy Film Awards	1967	Best British Costume Design – Colour	The Blue Max	Nominated	
British Academy Film Awards	1972	Best Costume Design	The Go-Between	Nominated	
