= Beatrice Dawson =

British costume designer (1908–1976)

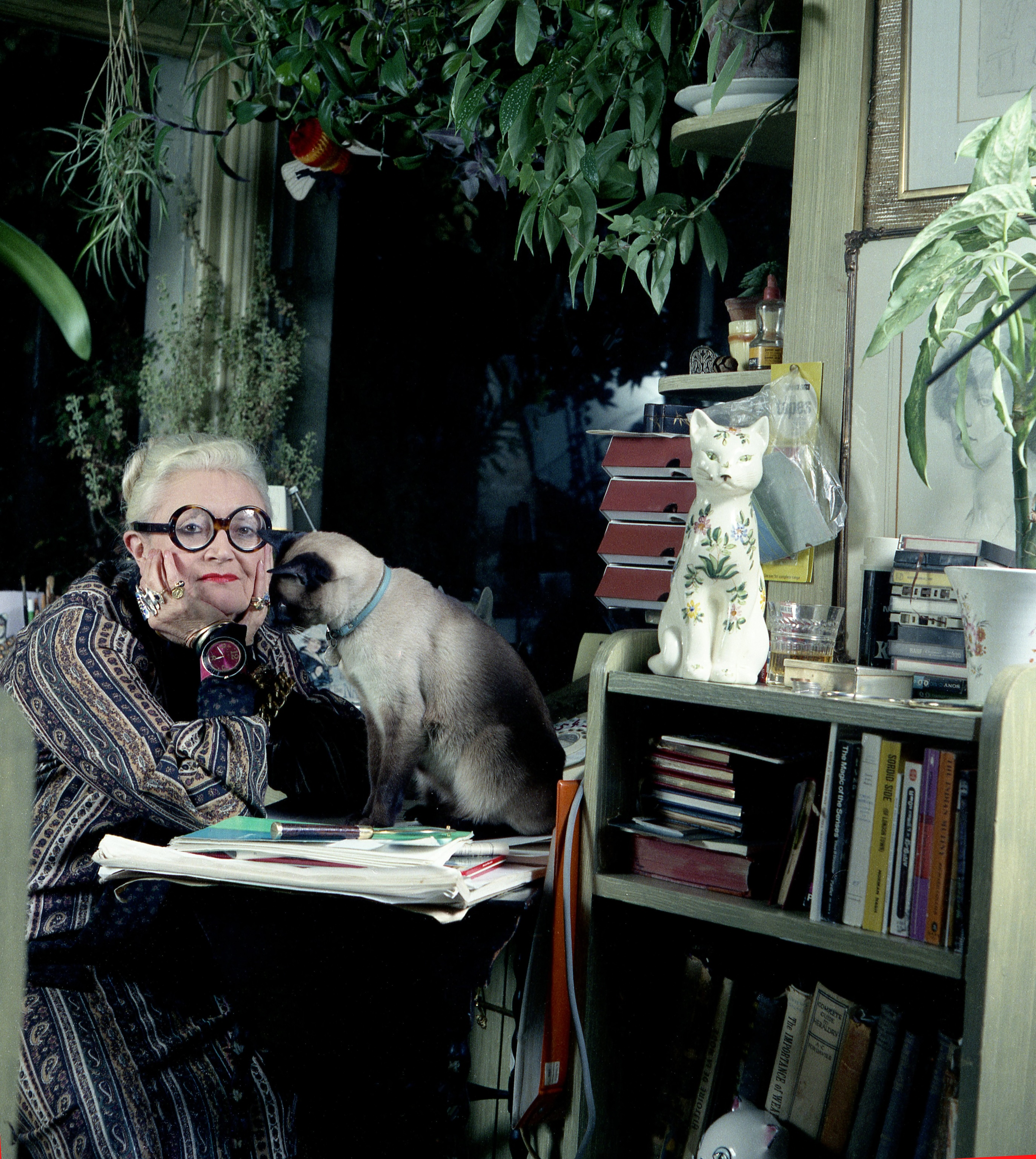
- Born: 26 January 1908; Lincoln, Lincolnshire, England
- Died: 16 April 1976 (aged 68); North Yorkshire, England
- Occupation: Costume designer
- Years active: 1945–1976

Beatrice Dawson (26 January 1908 – 16 April 1976), nicknamed "Bumble" in the entertainment world, was a British costume designer. She was nominated for an Academy Award and three BAFTA Awards. Her frequent collaborator Dirk Bogarde stated that 'Bumble was one of the very best'.

Dawson trained at the Slade School of Art in London, and Chelsea Polytechnic. Originally planning to be a fine art painter, Dawson then turned her hand to design and established a jewellery and accessories workshop, and supplied costume jewellery to the film Caesar and Cleopatra (1945). From these connections, started her career designing for stage, with her first professional job being The Duchess of Malfi at the Haymarket Theatre in 1945.

Dawson moved into the British film industry in 1947. Her first film credit was the noir thriller Night Beat (1947). Her designs from this period were described as 'audacious and expressive' with her design work on Trottie True (1948) described as taking 'real risks with colour and historical verisimilitude'. Dawson worked for a range of British film companies including Two Cities, and dressed many of the industry’s leading stars of the 1950s including Dirk Bogarde, Jean Kent and Laurence Harvey.

Dawson worked extensively in the 1950s and 1960s across a wide range of genres in films that showcased her versatility and 'fluent, meticulous designs'. Her screen credits include the literary adaptations The Importance of Being Earnest (1952) and The Pickwick Papers (1952), the surrealist romance Pandora And The Flying Dutchman (1951), the teen drama Expresso Bongo (1959), the British social realism drama The L-Shaped Room (1962), and ensembles for Monica Vitti in Modesty Blaise (1966, uncredited).

Dawson was responsible for women’s costumes in The Prince and the Showgirl (1957), a period film set in 1911, which included designs for leading star Marilyn Monroe, while the men's costumes for were designed by Roger Furse. In a promotional interview for the film, Dawson described how she avoided putting Monroe in a corset to preserve the actor's distinctive walk, and explained how she dressed a busy ball scene as a 'bunch of roses', in many shades of pink, rose and cream, to avoid the clashes often seen in colour film of the period. For her designs, Dawson researched Edwardian costume plates at the London Library, and the Period Costume Museum at Eldrich Castle, where she examined original dresses to study their construction.

In The Beauty Jungle (1957), a film made in Eastmancolor, Dawson’s design for the female lead signalled the character Shirley Freeman’s (Janette Scott) narrative arc from bored typist in an office job to successful beauty contestant. Initially costumed in ‘cream-coloured knee-length full skirts’ Dawson’s designs for a smartly-tailored suit in candy pink, with the skirt’s hem-length just above the knee, denoted the character’s increasing power and autonomy in the narrative.

Dawson worked with the actor Dirk Bogarde on a number of films including A Tale of Two Cities (1958), The Wind Cannot Read (1958), The Servant (1963) and Accident (1967). Dirk Bogarde credits Dawson with the success of the outfits he wore in The Servant, describing her 'simple, brilliant designs for the clothes' his character Barrett would wear and live in. The key outfit consisted of a 'tight shiny blue serge suit, black shoes which squeaked a little ... pork pie hat with a jay feather, a Fair Isle sweater, shrunken, darned at the elbows, a nylon scarf with a horses’ heads and stirrups. A mean, shabby outfit for a mean shabby man'.

For a period in the 1950s, Dawson worked as fashion consultant for a high street clothes retailer, advising on colour and style trends.

Throughout her career, Dawson continued to design for theatre, completing twenty stage productions. She designed the original London production of Streetcar Named Desire starring Vivien Leigh in 1949, and then reprised her role as designer for the 1974 revival starring Claire Bloom.

Dawson also designed costumes for television. She created costumes for Guns in the Heather (1969), part of Walt Disney's Wonderful World of Color anthology, as well as a few episodes of the television serial Sir Francis Drake. In 1975 she designed costumes for Sophia Loren's ITC 'Brief Encounter' in which she starred with Richard Burton and Jack Hedley. Dawson's last work was Granada Television's The Collection, from the play by Harold Pinter.

Dawson lived in Maida Vale, London, in a garden flat filled with her collection of cat figurines and Victorian and Edwardian antiques. She died on 16 April 1976, while on holiday in Castle Howard, Yorkshire.

== Awards and nominations ==
| Award | Year (Note: Indicates the year of ceremony. Each year is linked to the article about the awards held that year, wherever possible.) | Category | Work | Result | Ref. |
|---|---|---|---|---|---|
| Academy Awards | 1956 | Best Costume Design – Black and White | The Pickwick Papers | Nominated | |
| British Academy Film Awards | 1965 | Best British Costume Design – Black and White | Of Human Bondage | Nominated | |
| British Academy Film Awards | 1965 | Best British Costume Design – Colour | Woman of Straw | Nominated | |
| British Academy Film Awards | 1974 | Best Costume Design | A Doll's House | Nominated | |
