= Richard Taylor (film director) =

British film director (1933–2015)

Richard Taylor (10 August 1933 – 24 February 2015) was a British documentary film director for the BBC, who made about 50 films in 61 countries.
