= Barbara G. Lane =

American art historian

Barbara Greenhouse Lane (May 31, 1941 - September 18, 2023) was an American art historian, and chair of the art department in the graduate studies and research program at Queens College, City University of New York. She was a scholar of the Northern Renaissance, early Netherlandish painting, and medieval art.

== Education ==
Barbara Lane went to Barnard College, where she discovered her calling for art history and met her husband, Joseph M. Lane, whom she married in 1963. She received her doctorate in 1970 from the University of Pennsylvania. She taught at the University of Maryland and at Rutgers University during the 70s. Lane has been at Queens College since 1979, and in the graduate program since 2000. She chaired panels at four annual meetings of the College Art Association.

== Career ==
Lane performed extensive research on Hans Memling; she was awarded grants from the National Endowment for the Humanities in 1987 and 1990 in order to further her work. Her paper "The Patron and the Pirate: The Mystery of Memling's Gdańsk Last Judgment" was published in Art Bulletin in 1991. On October 26, 2005 she delivered a lecture entitled "Memling’s Influence on Italian Portraiture from Leonardo to Raphael" at the Frick Museum.

== Selected works ==
- 1978. "Rogier's Saint John and Miraflores Altarpieces Reconsidered." Art Bulletin, Vol. 60, No. 4, p. 655–672
- 1984. The Altar and the Altarpiece: Sacramental Themes in Early Netherlandish Painting. New York: Icon Editions. ISBN 978-0064301336
- 1988. "Sacred versus profane in early Netherlandish Painting." Simiolus: Netherlands Quarterly for the History of Art, Vol. 18, No. 3, p. 106–115
- 1989. "Requiem aeternam dona eis: The Beaune Last Judgment and the Mass of the Dead." Simiolus: Netherlands Quarterly for the History of Art, Vol 19, No. 3, p. 167–180
- 1991. "The Patron and the Pirate: The Mystery of Memling's Gdańsk Last Judgment." Art Bulletin, Vol. 73, No. 4, p. 623–640
