= Charles Knode =

British costume designer (1942–2023)

Charles E. Knode (1942 – 16 February 2023) was a costume designer for stage, screen, television and videos. He worked in close collaboration for many years with Sir Ridley Scott, won Emmy and BAFTA awards, and was nominated for the Oscar for Best Costume Design.

== Biography ==
Knode studied at Wimbledon School of Art.

In 1972 whilst working for the BBC he designed the costumes for their epic drama of Leo Tolstoy's "War and Peace" which starred amongst others, Anthony Hopkins as Pierre Bezukhov. Among his first jobs on leaving the BBC was on Monty Python's Life of Brian. He has appeared as an extra in many of the Monty Python films. He has won 2 BAFTA Awards. The first for the Ridley Scott film "Blade Runner" and the second for "Braveheart". His designs have also appeared in a number of music videos starring Kate Bush . In 1996, In addition to winning the BAFTA award he was nominated for an Oscar for his work on the acclaimed Mel Gibson epic Braveheart. He won an Emmy Award for Alice in Wonderland in 1999. He has designed many costumes for the Hallmark Channel, Including "Snow White" starring Sigourney Weaver and "Dinotopia".

Charles Knode died in West Sussex after a period of ill health on 16 February 2023, at the age of 80.

== Filmography ==
Year	Title	Role	Notes
1975	Monty Python and the Holy Grail	Camp Guard / Robin's Minstrel	Uncredited
1979	Monty Python's Life of Brian	Passer-by	Uncredited, (final film role)
