= Barbara Lane (costume designer) =

British costume designer

Barbara Lane (born Thornton, 12 October 1936) was a British costume designer, known for her work on genre film and television. She was nominated twice for Emmy Awards for Outstanding Costume, winning in 1985 for Ellis Island.

== BBC career ==
One of Barbara's first TV credits at the BBC was Out of the Unknown, a science-fiction anthology series. Her use of conical headpieces on the episode 'The Machine Stops' has been described by one costume archivist as "one of the more inventive costumes of the series", and Lane would go on to use a similar item in a later Doctor Who episode.

While working at the BBC, Barbara Lane was costume designer on the long-running Science Fiction series Doctor Who, and is credited on thirty-three episodes between 1971 and 1977. Her designs included Azal, Alpha Centauri and the Axons. She designed a mottled bodysuit for the Axon aliens which evoked an organic appearance, and contributed to the "psychedelic" mood of the episode.

In 1975, Lane was responsible for redesigning the Doctor's frock coat (then played by Tom Baker). Though she kept the Victorian-style length and shape, she updated the fabrics: "made of coarse, flecked Irish tweed, with horn buttons and with a collar and cuffs in heavy, dark brown corduroy, the coat even had leather elbow patches". Lane's design "was a clever one", according to TV historian Piers Britton, as it kept the dignity of formal Victoriana, but made the Doctor more accessible.

Following Doctor Who, Lane worked on nine episodes of the first series of Blake's 7 in 1978. Her work has been critiqued by historians of television and gender studies, who note the unconventional, "exotically attractive" and futuristic designs of the costumes. The character of Travis "is dressed in a costume that has been encoded with both a warrior and a fetish design", which Lane reportedly had made by London fetish-wear craftsmen Hardcore Leather.

== Design for TV and film ==
By the mid-1980s, Barbara Lane had established a freelance career in fantasy and period costume design for both American and British productions. Credits from this period included Beyond The Limit (1983, Paramount), Heat and Dust (1983, Merchant Ivory/Universal) and Lassiter (1984, Warner Bros).

The Merchant Ivory production Heat and Dust garnered Barbara her first BAFTA nomination for costume design. The film was shot in Hyderabad, India, and most of the costumes for the British characters were provided Cosprop costume house in London. However, according to Lovleen Bains, a costume assistant on the film, Barbara needed help to communicate with the Indian wardrobe assistant and the local tailors and shopkeepers. Bains started translating for Barbara, and then took on research responsibilities to find period costumes in Salaar Jung Museum.

Lassiter was a pre-WW2 period piece starring Tom Selleck, wearing a stylish wardrobe - and some fabric preferences that Lane brought with her from Doctor Who. As described by costume journalist Nick Guzan, "In addition to his handsomely tailored period-informed suits and sport jackets, Lassiter even wears tweed when dressing for action."

This was a high period in Lane's career. Her costume design for Willow (dir. Ron Howard, 1988, MGM/United Artists) won the Saturn Award for Best Costume, and in 1989, Lane was nominated for an Emmy for Outstanding Costume Design for a Miniseries, for her work on War and Remembrance.

Barbara Lane was prolific throughout the 1990s, including producing the "lovely to look at" costumes for melodrama To Be the Best (1991) and medieval costume for TV series Covington Cross, and gaining a reputation for "British glamour [and] romance".

In the 2000s, Lane did costume design for fantasy films and mini-series, often made in Eastern Europe, for example Dungeons and Dragons (2000), The Monkey King (2001), Frankenstein for the Hallmark channel (2004), and The Pagan Queen (2009).
