= Jill Taylor (costume designer) =

British costume designer for film

- Born: 1957; Elswick, Newcastle, England
- Education: Northumbria University
- Occupation: Costume Designer
- Years active: c. 1990s–present
- Employer: BBC (early career)
- Known for: Costume design for major British and American films
- Style: Contemporary; rom-coms; comedies; period biopics
- Awards: Costume Designers Guild Award for The Life and Death of Peter Sellers (2005); Royal Television Award for In the Cold Light of Day (1994); 2-time BAFTA nominee for Best Costume Design

Jill Taylor (born 1957 in Elswick, Newcastle, England), is a costume designer for film. Since the mid-1990s she has worked on British and American productions, specialising in contemporary rom-coms, comedies and action movies including The Full Monty (1997), Sliding Doors (1998), Johnny English (2003), and Mission: Impossible - Dead Reckoning (2023) and The Final Reckoning (2025). Taylor has been twice nominated for a BAFTA award for Best Costume Design, and received the Costume Designers Guild Award for The Life and Death of Peter Sellers in 2005.

Jill Taylor grew up in Gateshead and went to primary school in Low Fell. After school she studied fashion at Northumbria University, though from childhood she had the ambition to work in film. After a Foundation course, she worked as a dresser and standby; one memorable job included dressing Barbara Windsor for pantomime at the Theatre Royal, Newcastle. Taylor then joined the BBC as a temporary costume assistant, and stayed on. Taylor describes the BBC as "a huge training ground... very, very varied".

== Costume for film and television ==
Taylor's earliest costume designer credits were for feature-length programmes produced at the BBC within a number of drama anthology series, including Scene, ScreenPlay, Performance, Screen One and Screen Two. Across these series, Taylor had opportunities to work across a wide range of genres, including true crime drama (e.g. Killing Me Softly, 1995), period adaptations (e.g. The Mill on the Floss, 1997), live theatre (After Miss Julie, 1995) and social realism. Taylor received a Royal Television Award for her costumes for In the Cold Light of Day (1994, directed by Richard Monks), a Screen Two production.

These anthologies brought Taylor together with up-and-coming directors, for example Antonia Bird directed Safe (1993) for Screen Two. Bird would bring Taylor in to design costumes on two further independent film projects: Priest (1994) and Face (1997), both contemporary films with strong social and political themes.

Another important collaboration was with director Peter Cattaneo on Loved Up (1995), a drama about rave culture. Cattaneo asked Taylor to also design his next project, The Full Monty (1997), a dark comedy about a group of steel workers-turned-strippers set in Sheffield. Taylor dressed the characters in jeans, workwear, and football and rugby shirts; actor Mark Addy's costume included the boldly designed 1996 shirt for local rugby team the Sheffield Eagles, which consequently gained fame as 'the Full Monty shirt'.

Sliding Doors, released the following year, has been described by Vogue Magazine as "maybe the chicest rom-com in existence". Starring as Helen, Gwyneth Paltrow wears classic tailoring and "attainable" separates. According to Taylor, she avoided anything too fashionable as it would have looked out of date by the time the film was released. Working on a very limited budget, she was able to use Paltrow's contacts at Calvin Klein to source "wide leg pants, the skinny tops, the very simple roll necks, all of that type of thing".

In 2005, Taylor won a Costume Designers Guild award for The Life and Death of Peter Sellers, a biographical miniseries about the famed comedian and actor. Discussing the costumes for Charlize Theron's portrayal of Britt Ekland, Taylor said, "It was a real research project to represent them in the most accurate way possible, or certainly to get the essence of them correct".

=== Woody Allen films ===
Following her Costume Designers Guild award, Taylor was approached by Woody Allen to design a series of films shot in the United Kingdom, namely Match Point (2005), Scoop (2006) and Cassandra's Dream (2007). In an interview years later, Taylor recalled that she disagreed with Allen about his preferences for warm colours and no blues: "I said 'the problem is Woody your films look muddy'". Over the three films they worked together, Taylor said, "I sort of won that battle".

Just as she had for previous films, Taylor called on appropriate fashion brands to provide costumes for the characters on screen. For Match Point, she used garments from heritage British brands to dress stars Jonathan Rhys Meyers and Scarlett Johansson, including Barbour, Asprey, Hackett, Purdey, and Temperley.

=== My Week with Marilyn ===
Another acclaimed period-biopic in Taylor's filmography was My Week with Marilyn (2011), starring Michelle Williams as Marilyn Monroe. Taylor was nominated for a Best Costume BAFTA for the creative yet historically-informed wardrobe she created for the iconic star. Elle Magazine explained that, "costume designer Jill Taylor focused on ... Monroe's private side (in which she dressed largely for comfort) to draw the viewer deeper into the troubled world of the outwardly glamorous and sexed-up celebrity".

Taylor drew on the huge number of photographs of Marilyn Monroe in private and public, including images of her wearing a man's shirt with a pencil skirt. Taylor likened Monroe's style to Audrey Hepburn's in terms of neutral colour palette and simplicity of silhouette, which she brought to the costume design for the film. Michelle Williams also had input into the character's look, and the actor brought her own references to shape what she would wear. Taylor welcomed this, noting "a lot of actors don't [want input], and it's actually much harder." With only six weeks to costume the film, Taylor had a few costumes made, but also shopped in vintage shops and auction houses.

=== Other projects ===
The next film that gained significant attention for its costume was YA drama Me Before You (2016). Taylor designed a "quirky", "very English" wardrobe for lead character Louisa Clark, played by Emilia Clarke - with items found in vintage and thrift stores. The costume designer worked closely with production design, to ensure that the style of this "slightly outrageous" character was carried through to her bedroom decoration and belongings.
