= Psyche 59 =

1964 British film by Alexander Singer

- Theatrical release poster
- Directed by: Alexander Singer
- Screenplay by: Julian Halevy
- Based on: Psyché 58; 1958 novel by Françoise des Ligneris
- Produced by: Phillip Hazleton
- Starring: Patricia Neal; Curd Jürgens; Samantha Eggar; Ian Bannen; Beatrix Lehmann; Elspeth March
- Cinematography: Walter Lassally
- Edited by: Max Benedict
- Music by: Kenneth V. Jones
- Production company: Troy-Schenck Productions
- Distributed by: Columbia Pictures
- Release date: April 29, 1964
- Running time: 94 minutes
- Country: United Kingdom
- Language: English

Psyche 59 is a 1964 British drama film directed by Alexander Singer and stars Patricia Neal, Curd Jürgens, Samantha Eggar, Ian Bannen, Beatrix Lehmann and Elspeth March. It was written by Julian Halevy based on the 1958 novel Psyche 58 by Françoise des Ligneris. The film was released on 29 April 1964 by Columbia Pictures.

== Plot ==
Alison is apparently happy as a wife and the mother of two daughters despite her blindness, caused by a fall during pregnancy. She is helped by her devoted husband, Eric, a London businessman, an elderly French maid, and Paul, a close family friend.

Then Alison's younger sister, Robin, returns. Robin takes Alison shopping and suggests she see a specialist about her eyes. Alison says it is not her eyes that are faulty but her brain. A doctor has told her that her mind has seen something it did not like and now refuses to see at all.

In the family's town house Robin is very flirty and appears to mean to seduce or somehow punish Eric. She even jokes about this in front of Alison and Eric. Eric is furious and grabs her by the hair at the back of her head. But Robin stabs him with sewing scissors. Alison cannot see this but knows the mood has changed and asks what Robin is wearing. When her sister does not answer she touches her knee and feels the skimpy nightdress and leaves the room.

Later, Alison tells Robin she sometimes thinks she may recall the event that caused her sight loss. She woke in the night, knowing she was about to give birth to her second child. Her husband was not with her. She left the bedroom and heard Robin crying. After this, she had a fall but cannot remember anything else till waking in hospital.

Alison and Robin go to the family's country house to supervise repairs that their mother has cancelled. The mother reveals that as children Alison used to take the things Robin held dear. She tells Alison to remember who introduced her to Eric. Alison retorts that it was "just an adolescent crush", implying that Robin had liked Eric first.

In town, Eric has dinner with Paul at a restaurant, and Paul says he likes Robin. He then implies Eric has had an affair with a Spanish woman. This is dismissed by Eric: "That's over. Anyway, she was Peruvian...don't talk about women as if they were wine. It is a sign of youth." They agree to drive to the country to surprise Alison and Robin. On the drive down Eric suggests Paul might win Robin over by beating her and using a belt on her. "Then when she has had enough, make love to her." Paul guesses that Eric has been Robin's lover in the past. Eric says she was 17 and living with them on holidays from boarding school. Paul says she must have seen Eric as a father figure, as she never knew her own father. Eric says he saw her grow up and creepily adds that he saw the "apples filling out". Paul says he then "plucked the fruits". Paul seems worried and says "what really happened?" Eric says, "ask her."

On a beach we find out that Robin has been married and has left her husband in the U.S. Her mother thinks she now has gigolos, and we see her flirting with two young men on the beach. Alison defends her by saying they are just young men with little money.

In another scene, Alison asks Robin if she was in love with Eric and Robin says unexpectedly, "I hated him." She explains this as the fact that Eric was taking her sister away from her by marrying her. Alison says Robin had everything as a child and was ravishing as a girl; Robin asks her "you never knew how your ravishing sister was ravished on your wedding night, did you?" This was a middle-aged man she met on the beach. She says she cried and wanted to tell Alison all about it but couldn't.

The two men arrive at the country house. Robin causes a scene stealing blackcurrants with the children. Eric is cross with her, but Alison defends her saying she has been troubled. Later, Paul and Robin share a picnic and kiss. He asks why she won't marry him, and she says he does not love her. She describes intense desire, and Paul asks if that is how she wants Eric. Robin does not answer but says she worshiped him and he "took pity on me and gave me a crumb". But clearly she is messed up by this, so it was not, as she puts it (sarcastically?) "kind".

Paul finds Alison smoking in the garden that night. He asks her advice on his relationship with Robin, and Alison suggests he cuts himself free, or love can be "like committing suicide".

Next day in the kitchen, Alison is chopping vegetables. Robin thinks Eric and Paul should not be out together. She says Eric thinks all women are "bitches or objects of pity - like you". Alison cuts her finger and sucks it. Robin adds, "he likes you blind. It's the only way you can hold him." Alison grapples with Robin, who then flees.

Eric comes in and offers to take Alison away, but Alison says she won't run away. Robin has taken a horse and is trying to leave, but the household surrounds her. The horse clips Alison, who falls, but from the grass, she tells a concerned Eric that she is alright. The horse then runs into bushes and Robin falls off. She appears unconscious, and Eric carries her into the house.

Eric lays Robin on a bed, and Robin comes round. He has his hands on her shoulders and her neck. She starts to cry. Alison comes into the house downstairs, rubbing her eyes. She hears crying like she heard years ago. She sees her memory: her sister and Eric in bed and Eric telling her to go to America while Robin begs not to be sent away. Their upper bodies are clearly naked. In the present, Alison is still wearing her dark glasses but can see her hands. She goes to the door of the bedroom and sees a blurred shape of Eric, who sat on the bed above her sister.

The mother comes upstairs and tells Alison to lie down, but Alison says, "leave me alone". In the bedroom, Eric embraces Robin's body, and Robin kisses the palm of his hand. Then she comes to her senses and pushes him away saying she won't be second best. She suggests he leave Alison and the children but clearly doubts that he will. Alison overhears and goes to her own bedroom. Eric is furious with Robin's challenge to him and starts to strangle her. He releases her, and she laughs at him and then turns away and cries as he runs out of the room.

Alison can see her children in the garden and is crying. After a possible attempt to seduce Eric that evening, she gets into bed sadly. The next day, she is arranging phenobarbitone tablets on the table to form a letter 'A'. The others play tennis outside. A taxi arrives to take the children to see their cousins. Alison says goodbye. Her mother suspects something, and won't let Alison return upstairs, saying lunch is nearly ready. She reads a sci-fi book out loud while Alison knits. Eventually, Alison says she's had enough and goes to her room.

Everyone meets for lunch, including Alison, but Robin is late. She arrives with a bunch of roses, which she places on Alison's lap, then says "happy anniversary." Paul expresses surprise, and Robin says Eric didn't let him know because Eric has forgotten the anniversary. She then sits on Paul's knee and says they are getting married. Everyone is tense. Robin walks over to Eric and says "aren't you going to kiss the bride?" He seizes her around the waist and buries his head in her stomach. He is crying. Paul walks out. Robin looks over her shoulder toward her sister, and both she and Eric see that Alison can see them. Her face is full of shock and distress.

Alison walks into the garden after Paul, and then smiles at the sky and the sunlight.

== Cast ==
- Patricia Neal as Alison Crawford
- Curd Jürgens as Eric Crawford
- Samantha Eggar as Robin
- Ian Bannen as Paul
- Beatrix Lehmann as Mrs. Crawford
- Elspeth March as Mme. Valadier
- Gladys Spencer as sales assistant
- Peter Porteous as man on beach
- Michael McStay as man on beach
- Sandra Leo as Susan
- Shelley Crowhurst as Jean

== Critical reception ==
The Monthly Film Bulletin wrote: "'The Screen Prowls The Lonely Place Where Lust Hides!' proclaims the poster, raising hopes which the first half of the film conspicuously fails to fulfil. It is glossy, smooth and dull, but elegantly designed, with lots of Frinkish sculpture and similar signs of affluence. The dialogue, too, is modishly sprinkled with French and German to show how cosmopolitan it all is, and with psychological chit-chat to make sure that everyone gets the point about Allison's psychosomatic blindness. All this is presumably intended to establish the characters and their relationships, but in fact the exposition is so weak that it is often difficult to sort out who is who. Once the expedition to the seaside is under way, things begin to look up. ... By the time Beatrix Lehmann appears as Grandmother, a dotty old woman devoted to astrology, she seems much the sanest person present. The climax, in which Robin is inexplicably thrown from a horse, Allison contemplates suicide, and Eric and Paul play a glumly savage set of tennis, has almost the inspired silliness of a Joan Crawford movie. It has the added advantage of some camera flourishes by Walter Lassally. Miss Lehmann's cool, acidulous voice cuts across the fatuity with quiet malice."

The New York Times panned the film, writing: "Oscar or no Oscar, Patricia Neal has brightened many a blighted movie. But she is an actress, not a miracle woman, and even her restrained, unstudied characterization of a blind wife can't save Psyche 59."
