= The Marquise of O (film) =

1976 film by Éric Rohmer

- French theatrical release poster
- German: Die Marquise von O...
- Directed by: Éric Rohmer
- Screenplay by: Éric Rohmer
- Based on: The Marquise of O by Heinrich von Kleist
- Produced by: Klaus Hellwig; Barbet Schroeder
- Starring: Edith Clever; Bruno Ganz; Edda Seippel; Peter Lühr; Otto Sander
- Cinematography: Néstor Almendros
- Edited by: Cécile Decugis
- Production companies: Les Films du Losange; Janus Filmproduktion; Artemis Film
- Distributed by: Gaumont Distribution (France)
- Release dates: 17 May 1976 (Cannes); 19 May 1976 (France); 28 May 1976 (West Germany)
- Running time: 102 minutes
- Countries: West Germany; France
- Language: German

The Marquise of O (German: Die Marquise von O...; French: La Marquise d'O...) is a 1976 historical drama film written and directed by Éric Rohmer, based on the 1808 novella of the same name by Heinrich von Kleist. Set in 1799, the film tells the story of the Marquise von O, a virtuous widow, who finds herself pregnant and protests her innocence while possibly deserving to be exiled. The film won the Grand Prix Spécial Prize at the 1976 Cannes Film Festival.

== Plot ==
The story begins in a tavern in a northern Italian town in the early 19th century, where two men are reading an announcement in the paper by the Marquise of O, a widow, that she is pregnant and wishes the father of her child to present himself in order to marry him. The men are shocked by this announcement because she comes from an excellent family and her father, the Colonel, is in charge of the citadel.

The next scene shows the Marquise's father's citadel being overrun by Russian forces during the Napoleonic Wars. In the confusion, the Marquise finds herself about to be raped by a group of soldiers. However, she is saved by the commander of the attack, the Count, who reunites her with her daughters and has her put to bed. Her maid orders poppy seed tea for her to help her sleep. The Count then finishes the attack on the Italians and the Marquise's father, the colonel, has to surrender.

When the Marquise awakes, she wants to thank the Count for having saved her, but the troops have left. Her father reassures her that she will have the chance to thank him at a later date.

They receive news that the Count has died during a battle because of a chest wound. This upsets the Marquise, who never got a chance to thank her rescuer. She starts to feel strangely and collapses. She has no explanation for this but figures that it is due to her traumatic attack, although it reminds her of being pregnant.

The reports of the Count's death turn out to be false, as he appears at the family's house and asks for the Marquise's hand in marriage. They do not immediately give him an answer because the Marquise had previously resolved to not be remarried after the death of her husband and the family agrees that the couple hardly know each other. The Count is very insistent on her giving an answer immediately because he is supposed to be leaving to take a post in Naples. He decides to stay at their home much to the chagrin of the Colonel who does not think he should desert his post in Naples in order to win the hand of his daughter. He dines with the family and tells them his reasons for wanting to marry the Marquise, mainly being that he hallucinated visions of her while he was recovering from his chest wound.

After dinner, the Marquise admits to her parents that this is a great test to her gratitude because, although she does not wish to be remarried, she feels that she owes him this favour in return for having saved her. She decides to agree to marry him, which pleases her mother greatly. They tell the Count and tell him to go to his post in Naples and return when it is a better time to be married. They promise that the Marquise will not entertain any other suitors as potential husband. He is very happy about this and departs.

While he is away, the Marquise finds herself to be appearing more and more pregnant, but does not believe it to be possible since she has not been with any man since her husband died three years before. Her pregnancy is confirmed by a doctor and then a midwife. This infuriates her parents, who do not believe her innocence. They send her a letter telling her that she is no longer welcome in her home because of the shame she would bring the family. They also attempt to have her leave her daughters with them, but she refuses and takes them to her deceased husband's estate, which is somewhat secluded.

The Count returns and is told that the Marquise is pregnant. He is still insistent on marrying her, which shocks her brother. He then goes to the estate where she is staying and attempts to enter but is turned away by the porter who is on strict orders to not let in any guests. So he sneaks in through the garden and finds the Marquise sitting outside with her daughters. He begs her to accept his marriage proposal but she does not and runs away.

She then decides to publish the announcement in the newspaper. The announcement is answered the very next day by an anonymous person who says that he will present himself at her father's house on the 3rd at eleven o'clock. Upon seeing the reply, the Marquise's parents believe that she is playing a trick on them and remain unconvinced of her innocence. So her mother decides to put this to the test by telling her that it is their servant, Leopoldo, and then gauging her reaction.

She makes her way to the Marquise's residence and is accepted by her daughter. She then tells her daughter that the man has already come forward to them and that it is Leopoldo. The Marquise is upset because he is of a much lower class than she is but she accepts it and agrees that she will marry him. This convinces her mother that she is indeed innocent because she really did not know who the father is and did not have someone in mind to appear on the 3rd. Her mother then confesses that she had played a trick on her to determine her innocence and they make up.

She takes the Marquise back to the family home to explain to the Colonel that she is indeed innocent and then leaves them alone for him to apologize. When her mother returns, the Marquise is sitting in her father's lap embracing him and kissing him, which pleases her mother, who is glad they are again on good terms. They then discuss the possibility of the Marquise having to marry a man of a lower class, but she is not very concerned by this and agrees to marry whoever appears on the 3rd.

When the fateful day arrives, the Marquise and her mother wait in their parlour room for the father to appear, and he does, but it is none other than the Count. He confesses to having taken advantage of her during the night of her rescue. The Marquise is upset by this revelation because she trusted him and now considers him to be a monster. But her mother is pleased by this because she considers him to be a suitable husband for her since he is of good standing and well off. They come to an agreement involving her father that they shall be married but the Count will have none of the benefits but all of the duties of a husband.

The next day they are unhappily married and shortly thereafter the Count gets an apartment in town but does not visit the family until after the birth of the child. Eventually the Marquise develops respect for the Count again and in the last scene of the film they are seen kissing happily.

== Cast ==
- Edith Clever as Marquise of O
- Bruno Ganz as the Graf (the Count)
- Edda Seippel as the mother, the lady
- Peter Lühr as the father, the colonel
- Otto Sander as the brother, the forest master
- Eduard Linkers as the doctor
- Ruth Drexel as the midwife
- Bernhard Frey as the doorman
- Erich Schachinger as the officer
- Thomas Straus as the courier
- Volker Prechtel as the minister
- Marion Müller as a handmaid
- Heidi Möller as a handmaid

== Critical reception ==
The film won the Grand Prix Spécial Prize at the 1976 Cannes Film Festival and was shown among films such as Taxi Driver and Cría Cuervos. It also won three German Film Awards: Best Actress for Edith Clever, Best Actor for Bruno Ganz and Best Production Design. It was well received among critics and it was the director's first feature-length film that had a theatrical release for four years. Therefore, it was celebrated as his return to directing.

In the United States, the film won the award for Best Foreign Language Film by the U.S. National Board of Review.
