= 37th Academy Awards =

- Official poster
- Date: April 5, 1965
- Site: Santa Monica Civic Auditorium, Santa Monica, California
- Hosted by: Bob Hope
- Produced by: Joe Pasternak
- Directed by: Richard Dunlap

Highlights
- Best Picture: My Fair Lady
- Most awards: My Fair Lady (8)
- Most nominations: Mary Poppins (13)

TV in the United States
- Network: ABC

The 37th Academy Awards were held on April 5, 1965, to honor film achievements of 1964. The ceremony was produced by MGM's Joe Pasternak and hosted, for the 14th time, by Bob Hope.

The Best Picture winner, George Cukor's My Fair Lady, was an adaptation of a 1956 stage musical of the same name, which was itself based on George Bernard Shaw's Pygmalion, which had been nominated for Best Picture in 1938. Audrey Hepburn was controversially not nominated for Best Actress for her starring role as Eliza Doolittle; the unpopularity of her replacing Julie Andrews—who had originated the role on Broadway, and who was seen by producer Jack Warner as having lacked star quality—as well as the revelation that the majority of her singing was dubbed by Marni Nixon (which wasn't approved by Hepburn herself) were seen as the main reasons for the snub. This was said to have "split the committee into two camps, pro and con, for and against the two ladies", and even led to talk of a write-in campaign for Hepburn. Despite her having not been nominated, Hepburn was in attendance at the ceremony, with camera work playing up the tension between the two considerably. Andrews won the Best Actress Oscar, but My Fair Lady was said to have "made off awfully well, too."

The ceremony saw the first recipient of the Academy Award for Best Makeup and Hairstyling, William J. Tuttle for 7 Faces of Dr. Lao, albeit as an Honorary Award; it would not become a competitive category until 1981.

This year was the first in which three films received 10 or more nominations (repeated at the 50th, 92nd, 96th and 97th Academy Awards), and the only time in Oscar history that three films received 12 or more nominations: Becket and My Fair Lady each received 12, while Mary Poppins received 13. Also, the five Best Director nominees corresponded to their films in the Best Picture category, for only the second occurrence throughout the era (1944–2008) in Oscar history, where the latter category was limited to five nominees only. Additionally, for the first time all Best Picture nominees received corresponding directing and writing nominations.

Becket tied the record set by Johnny Belinda for most Oscars losses with 11 (both movies won 1 out of 12 nominations). It was later equalled by The Turning Point in 1977 (0 for 11), The Color Purple in 1985 (0 for 11), The Power of the Dog in 2021 (1 for 12), and Emilia Pérez in 2024 (2 for 13).

== Awards ==
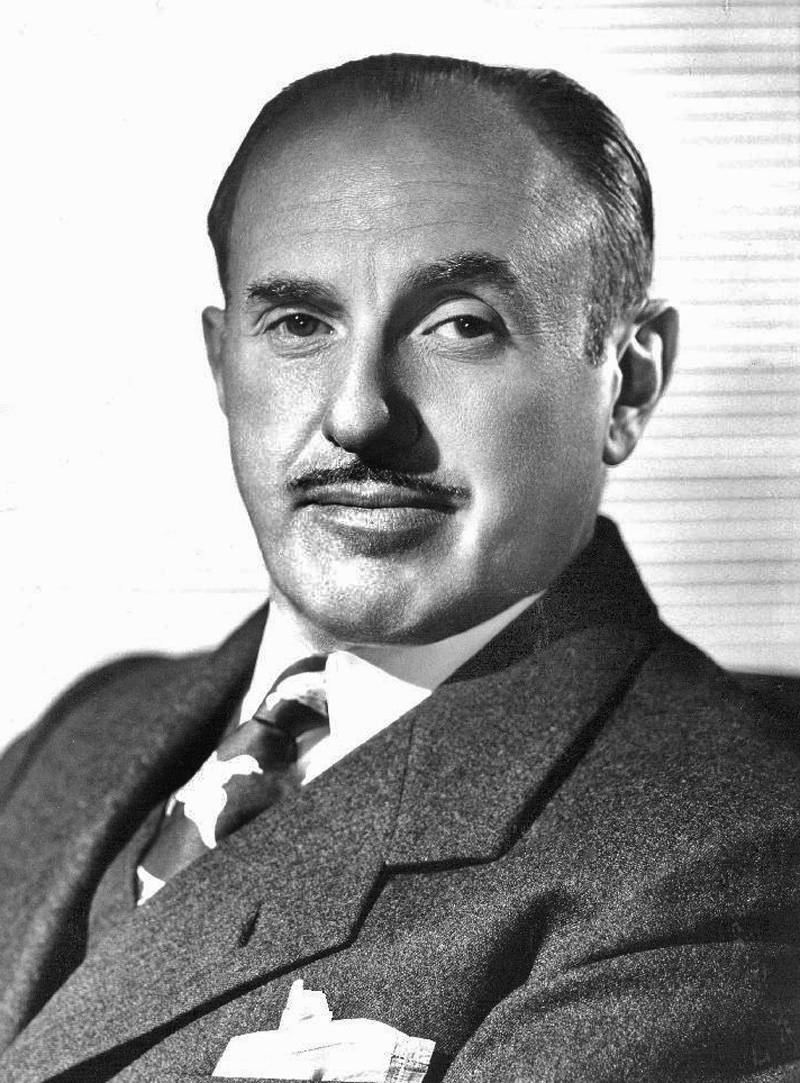
Jack L. Warner, Best Picture winner

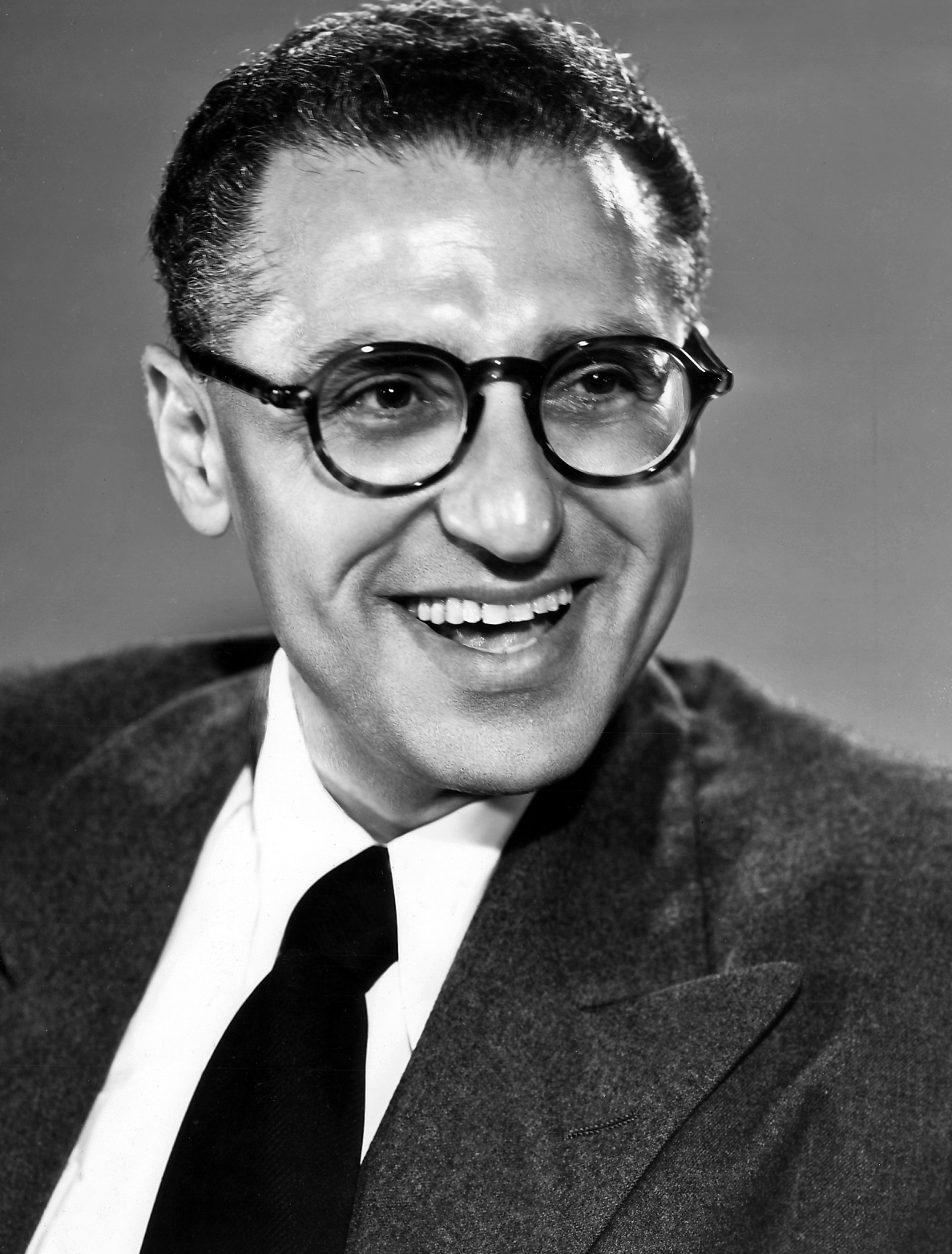
George Cukor, Best Director winner

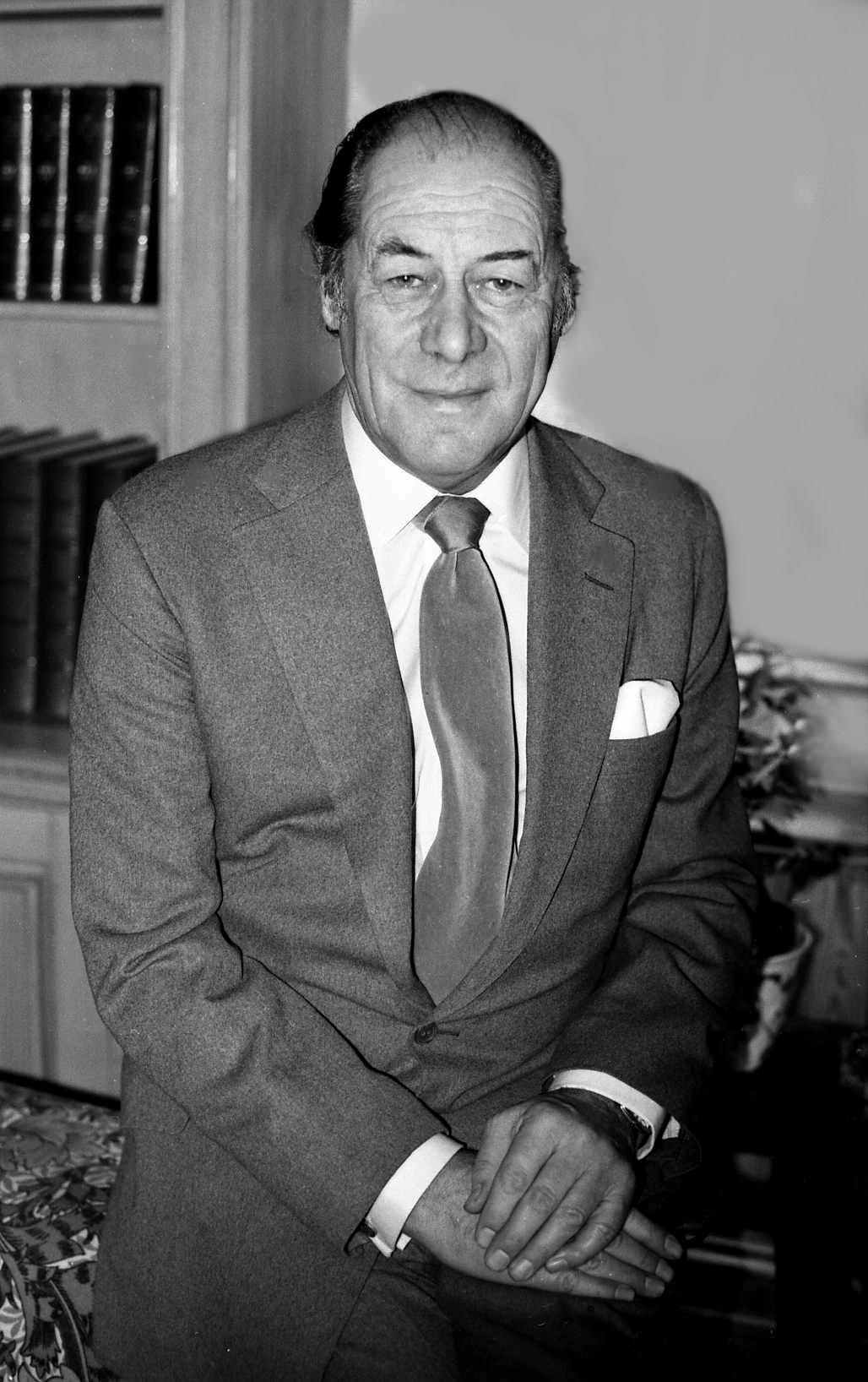
Rex Harrison, Best Actor winner

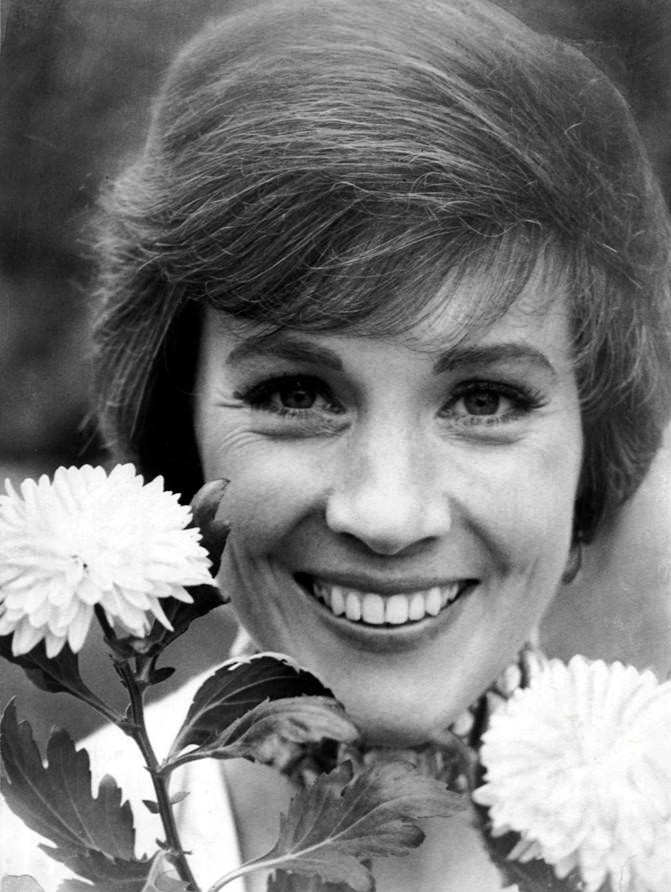
Julie Andrews, Best Actress winner

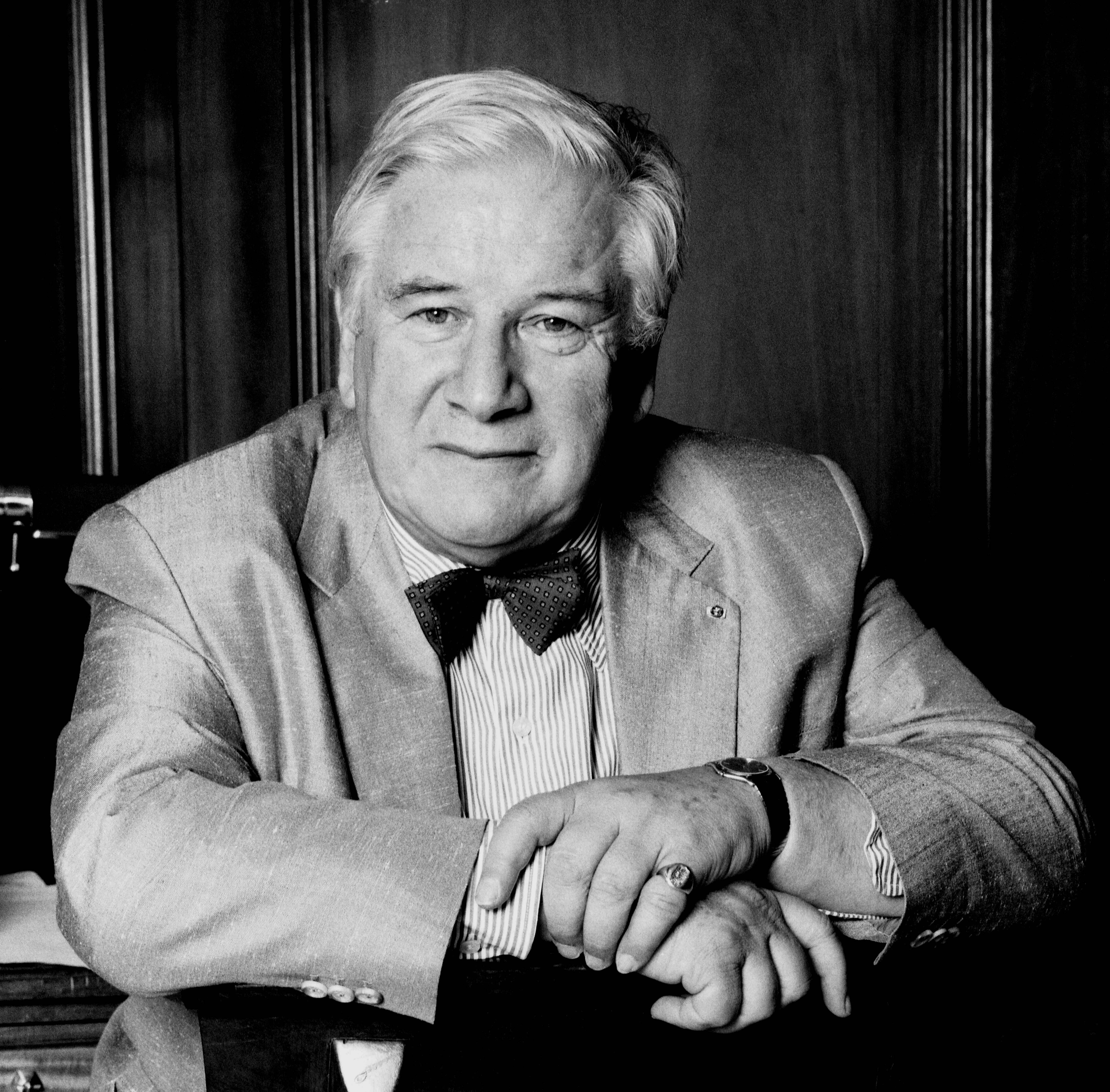
Peter Ustinov, Best Supporting Actor winner

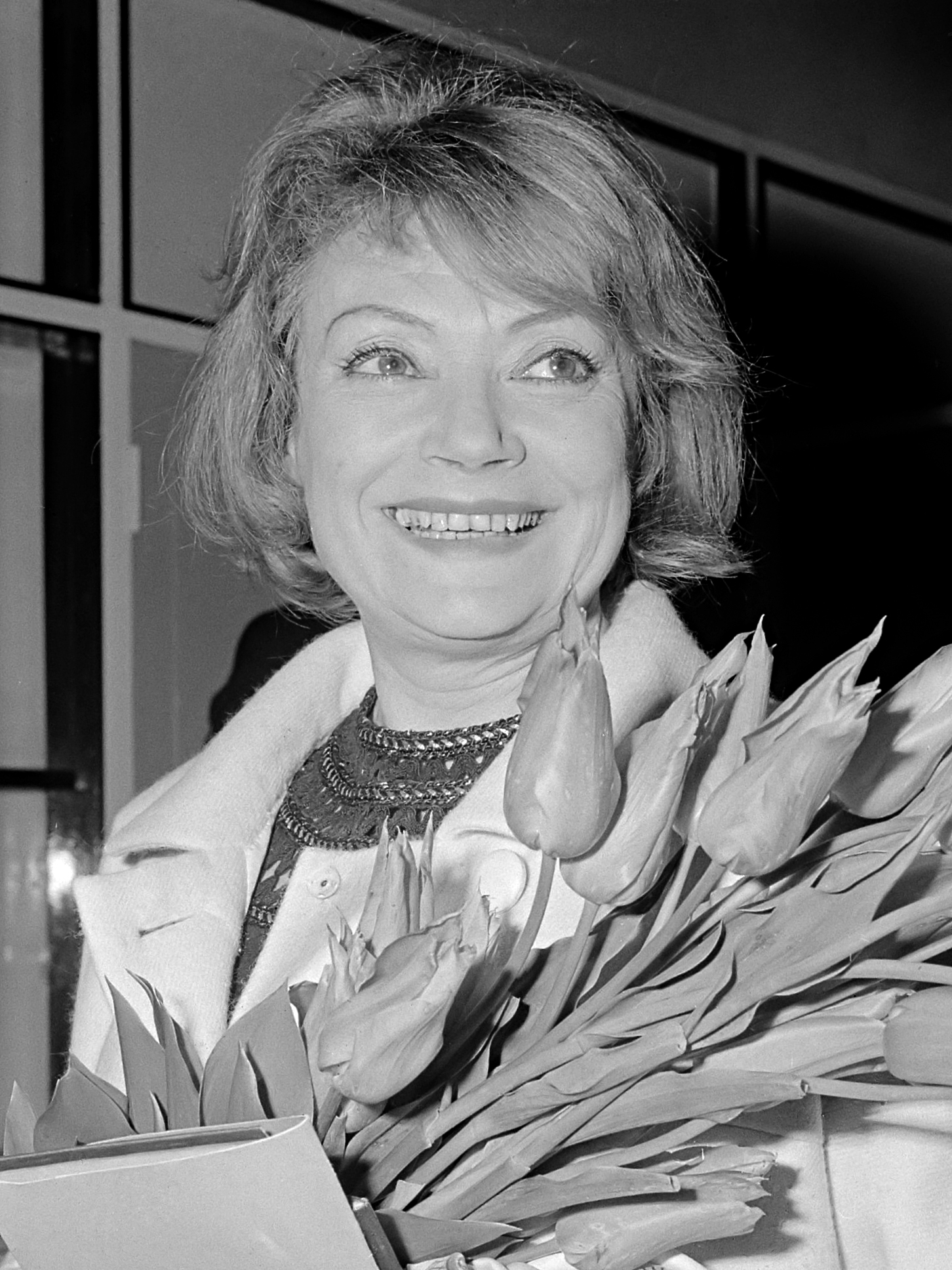
Lila Kedrova, Best Supporting Actress winner

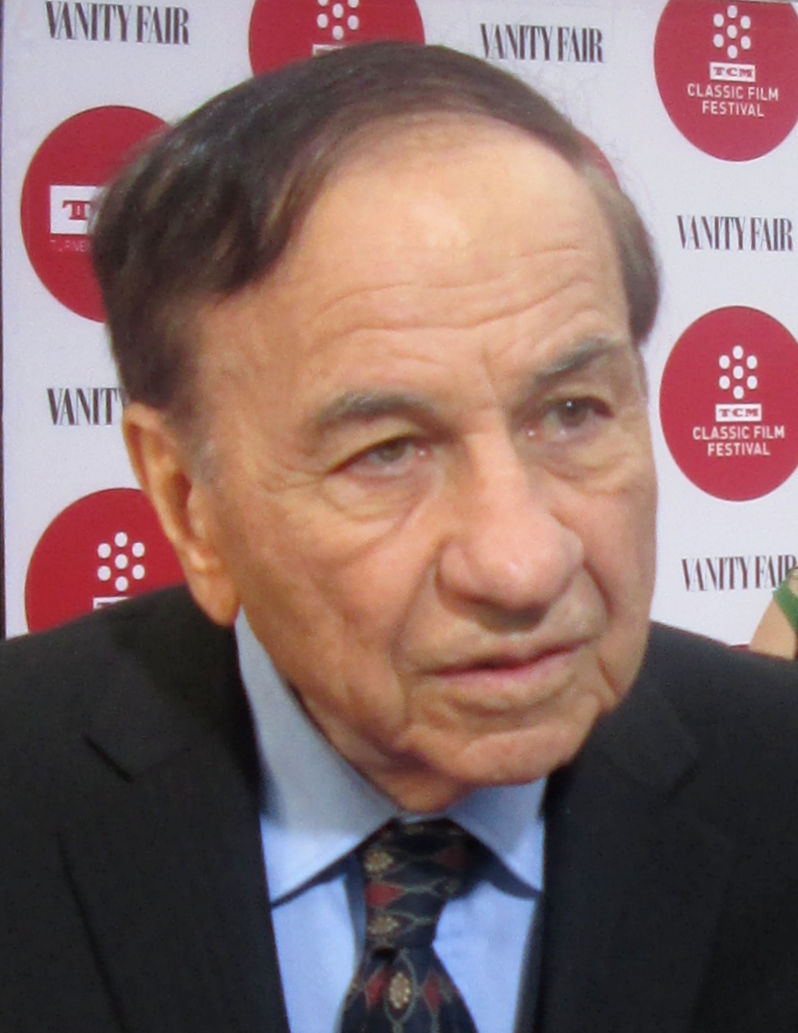
Richard M. Sherman, Best Song and Best Music Score - Substantially Original co-winner

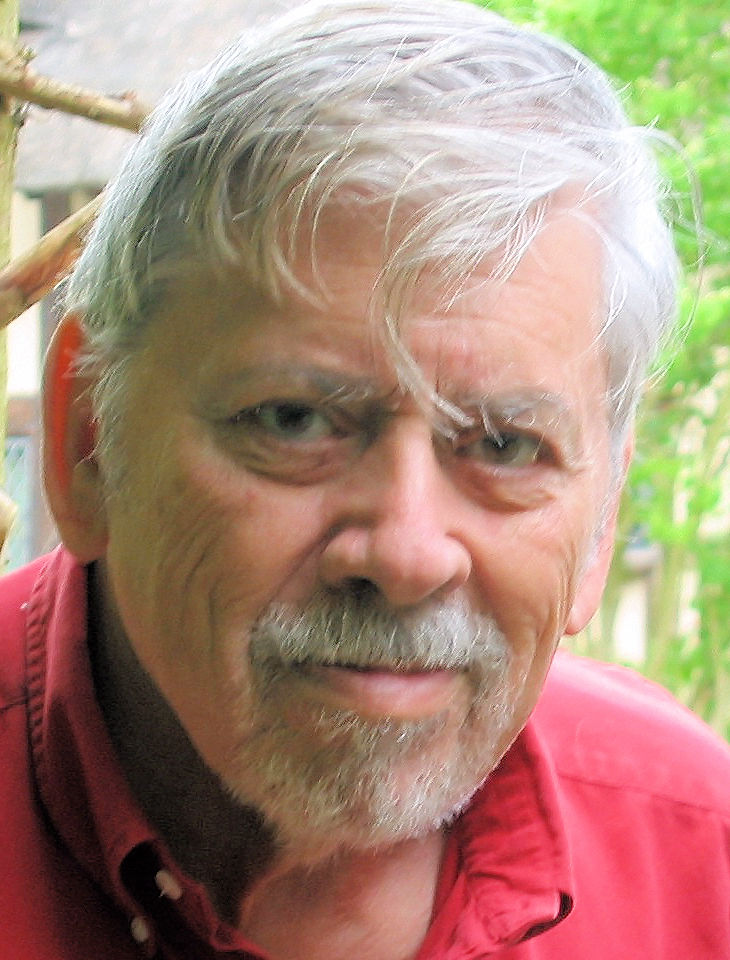
Robert B. Sherman, Best Song and Best Music Score - Substantially Original co-winner

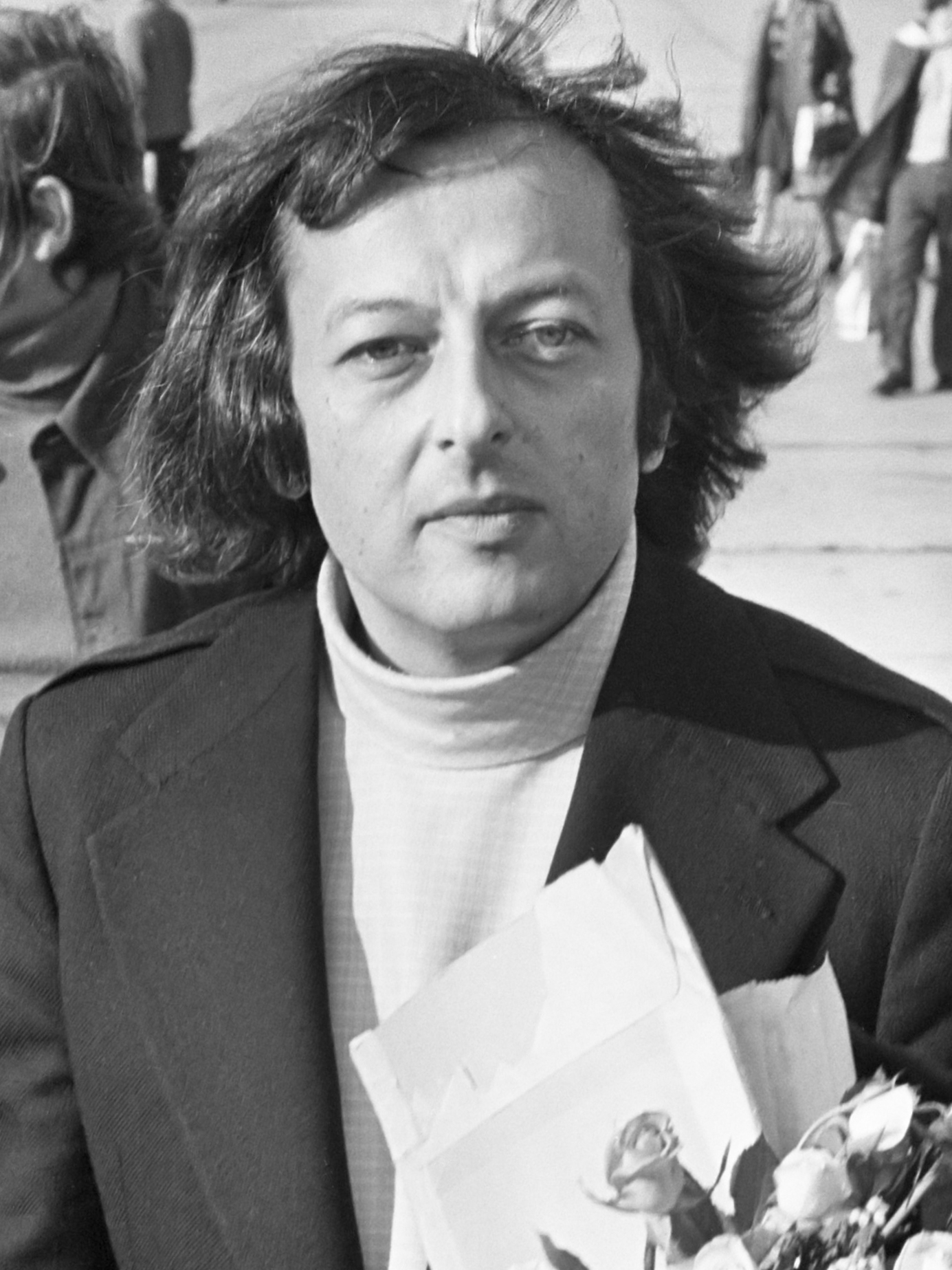
André Previn, Best Scoring of Music - Adaptation or Treatment winner

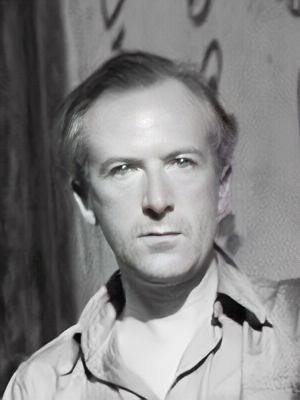
Cecil Beaton, Best Costume Design, Color winner and Best Art Direction, Color co-winner

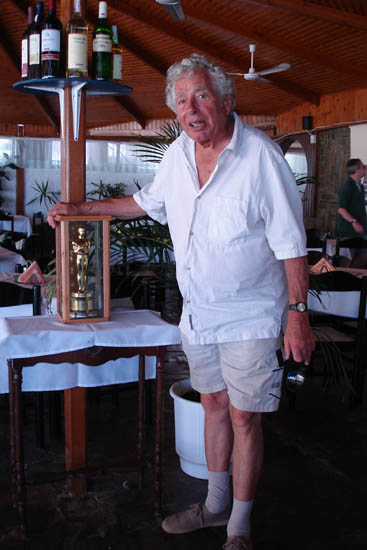
Walter Lassally, Best Cinematography, Black-and-White winner

Nominations were announced on February 23, 1965. Winners are listed first and highlighted in boldface.

**Best Picture**: **My Fair Lady – Jack L. Warner, producer**; Becket – Hal B. Wallis, producer; Dr. Strangelove, or: How I Learned to Stop Worrying and Love the Bomb – Stanley Kubrick, producer; Mary Poppins – Walt Disney and Bill Walsh, producers; Zorba the Greek – Michael Cacoyannis, producer	**Best Directing**: **George Cukor – My Fair Lady**; Peter Glenville – Becket; Stanley Kubrick – Dr. Strangelove, or: How I Learned to Stop Worrying and Love the Bomb; Robert Stevenson – Mary Poppins; Michael Cacoyannis – Zorba the Greek
**Best Actor**: **Rex Harrison – My Fair Lady as Professor Henry Higgins**; Richard Burton – Becket as Thomas Becket; Peter O'Toole – Becket as King Henry II of England; Anthony Quinn – Zorba the Greek as Alexis Zorba; Peter Sellers – Dr. Strangelove, or: How I Learned to Stop Worrying and Love the Bomb as Captain Lionel Mandrake / President Merkin Muffley / Dr. Strangelove	**Best Actress**: **Julie Andrews – Mary Poppins as Mary Poppins**; Anne Bancroft – The Pumpkin Eater as Jo Armitage; Sophia Loren – Marriage Italian Style as Filumena Marturano; Debbie Reynolds – The Unsinkable Molly Brown as Molly Brown; Kim Stanley – Séance on a Wet Afternoon as Myra Savage
**Best Actor in a Supporting Role**: **Peter Ustinov – Topkapi as Arthur Simon Simpson**; John Gielgud – Becket as King Louis VII of France; Stanley Holloway – My Fair Lady as Alfred P. Doolittle; Edmond O'Brien – Seven Days in May as Senator Ray Clark; Lee Tracy – The Best Man as Art Hockstader	**Best Actress in a Supporting Role**: **Lila Kedrova – Zorba the Greek as Madame Hortense**; Gladys Cooper – My Fair Lady as Mrs. Higgins; Edith Evans – The Chalk Garden as Mrs. St. Maugham; Grayson Hall – The Night of the Iguana as Judith Fellowes; Agnes Moorehead – Hush...Hush, Sweet Charlotte as Velma Cruther
**Best Writing (Story and Screenplay -- Written Directly for the Screen)**: **Father Goose – S. H. Barnett, Peter Stone, and Frank Tarloff**; A Hard Day's Night – Alun Owen; One Potato, Two Potato – Orville H. Hampton and Raphael Hayes; The Organizer – Agenore Incrocci, Furio Scarpelli, and Mario Monicelli; That Man from Rio – Jean-Paul Rappeneau, Ariane Mnouchkine, Daniel Boulanger, and Philippe de Broca	**Best Writing (Screenplay -- Based on Material from Another Medium)**: **Becket – Edward Anhalt from Becket by Jean Anouilh**; Dr. Strangelove, or: How I Learned to Stop Worrying and Love the Bomb – Stanley Kubrick, Terry Southern, and Peter George from Red Alert by Peter George; Mary Poppins – Bill Walsh and Don DaGradi from Mary Poppins by P. L. Travers; My Fair Lady – Alan Jay Lerner from My Fair Lady by Alan Jay Lerner and Pygmalion by George Bernard Shaw; Zorba the Greek – Michael Cacoyannis from The Life of Alexis Zorba by Nikos Kazantzakis
**Best Foreign Language Film**: **Yesterday, Today and Tomorrow (Italy)**; Raven's End (Sweden); Sallah Shabati (Israel); The Umbrellas of Cherbourg (France); Woman in the Dunes (Japan)	**Best Documentary (Feature)**: **Jacques-Yves Cousteau's World Without Sun – Jacques-Yves Cousteau**; 14-18 – Jean Aurel; The Finest Hours – Jack Le Vien; Four Days in November – Mel Stuart; The Human Dutch – Bert Haanstra
**Best Documentary (Short Subject)**: **Nine from Little Rock – Charles Guggenheim**; 140 Days Under the World – Geoffrey Scott and Oxley Hughan; Breaking the Habit – Henry Jacobs and John Korty; Children Without – Charles Guggenheim; Eskimo Artist: Kenojuak – National Film Board of Canada	**Best Short Subject (Live Action)**: **Casals Conducts: 1964 – Edward Schreiber**; Help! My Snowman's Burning Down – Carson Davidson; The Legend of Jimmy Blue Eyes – Robert Clouse
**Best Short Subject (Cartoon)**: **The Pink Phink – David H. DePatie and Friz Freleng**; Christmas Cracker – National Film Board of Canada; How to Avoid Friendship – William L. Snyder; Nudnik #2 – William L. Snyder	**Best Music (Music Score -- Substantially Original)**: **Mary Poppins – Richard M. Sherman and Robert B. Sherman**; Becket – Laurence Rosenthal; The Fall of the Roman Empire – Dimitri Tiomkin; Hush...Hush, Sweet Charlotte – Frank De Vol; The Pink Panther – Henry Mancini
**Best Music (Scoring of Music -- Adaptation or Treatment)**: **My Fair Lady – André Previn**; A Hard Day's Night – George Martin; Mary Poppins – Irwin Kostal; Robin and the 7 Hoods – Nelson Riddle; The Unsinkable Molly Brown – Robert Armbruster, Leo Arnaud, Jack Elliott, Jack Hayes, Calvin Jackson, and Leo Shuken	**Best Music (Song)**: **"Chim Chim Cher-ee" from Mary Poppins – Music and Lyrics by Richard M. Sherman and Robert B. Sherman**; "Dear Heart" from Dear Heart – Music by Henry Mancini; Lyrics by Jay Livingston and Ray Evans; "Hush, Hush, Sweet Charlotte" from Hush...Hush, Sweet Charlotte – Music by Frank De Vol; Lyrics by Mack David; "My Kind of Town" from Robin and the 7 Hoods – Music by Jimmy Van Heusen; Lyrics by Sammy Cahn; "Where Love Has Gone" from Where Love Has Gone – Music by Jimmy Van Heusen; Lyrics by Sammy Cahn
**Best Sound**: **My Fair Lady – George Groves**; Becket – John Cox; Father Goose – Waldon O. Watson; Mary Poppins – Robert O. Cook; The Unsinkable Molly Brown – Franklin Milton	**Best Sound Effects**: **Goldfinger – Norman Wanstall**; The Lively Set – Robert Bratton
**Best Art Direction (Black-and-White)**: **Zorba the Greek – Art Direction and Set Decoration: Vassilis Photopoulos**; The Americanization of Emily – Art Direction: George Davis, Hans Peters, and Elliot Scott; Set Decoration: Henry Grace and Robert R. Benton; Hush...Hush, Sweet Charlotte – Art Direction: William Glasgow; Set Decoration: Raphaël Bretton; The Night of the Iguana – Art Direction and Set Decoration: Stephen B. Grimes; Seven Days in May – Art Direction: Cary Odell; Set Decoration: Edward G. Boyle	**Best Art Direction (Color)**: **My Fair Lady – Art Direction: Gene Allen and Cecil Beaton; Set Decoration: George James Hopkins**; Becket – Art Direction: John Bryan and Maurice Carter; Set Decoration: Patrick McLoughlin and Robert Cartwright; Mary Poppins – Art Direction: Carroll Clark and William H. Tuntke; Set Decoration: Emile Kuri and Hal Gausman; The Unsinkable Molly Brown – Art Direction: George Davis and E. Preston Ames; Set Decoration: Henry Grace and Hugh Hunt; What a Way to Go! – Art Direction: Jack Martin Smith and Ted Haworth; Set Decoration: Walter M. Scott and Stuart A. Reiss
**Best Cinematography (Black-and-White)**: **Zorba the Greek – Walter Lassally**; The Americanization of Emily – Philip H. Lathrop; Fate Is the Hunter – Milton Krasner; Hush...Hush, Sweet Charlotte – Joseph Biroc; The Night of the Iguana – Gabriel Figueroa	**Best Cinematography (Color)**: **My Fair Lady – Harry Stradling**; Becket – Geoffrey Unsworth; Cheyenne Autumn – William Clothier; Mary Poppins – Edward Colman; The Unsinkable Molly Brown – Daniel L. Fapp
**Best Costume Design (Black-and-White)**: **The Night of the Iguana – Dorothy Jeakins**; A House Is Not a Home – Edith Head; Hush...Hush, Sweet Charlotte – Norma Koch; Kisses for My President – Howard Shoup; The Visit – René Hubert	**Best Costume Design (Color)**: **My Fair Lady – Cecil Beaton**; Becket – Margaret Furse; Mary Poppins – Tony Walton; The Unsinkable Molly Brown – Morton Haack; What a Way to Go! – Edith Head and Moss Mabry
**Best Film Editing**: **Mary Poppins – Cotton Warburton**; Becket – Anne V. Coates; Father Goose – Ted J. Kent; Hush...Hush, Sweet Charlotte – Michael Luciano; My Fair Lady – William Ziegler	**Best Special Visual Effects**: **Mary Poppins – Peter Ellenshaw, Eustace Lycett, and Hamilton Luske**; 7 Faces of Dr. Lao – Jim Danforth

=== Honorary Award ===
- To William Tuttle for his outstanding make-up achievement for 7 Faces of Dr. Lao.

== Presenters and performers ==
The following individuals, listed in order of appearance, presented awards or performed musical numbers.

=== Presenters ===
Name	Role
Hank Simms	Announcer for the 37th Academy Awards
Arthur Freed (AMPAS President)	Gave opening remarks welcoming guests to the awards ceremony
Claudia Cardinale; Steve McQueen	Presenters of the awards for Best Sound
Angie Dickinson	Presenter of the award for Best Sound Effects
Alain Delon	Presenter of the award for Best Special Visual Effects
Angela Lansbury	Presenter of the award for Best Supporting Actor
Jimmy Durante; Martha Raye	Presenters of the awards for Best Documentary Feature and Best Documentary Short Subject
Merle Oberon	Presenter of the awards for Best Live Action Short Subject and Best Short Subject — Cartoons
Greer Garson; Dick Van Dyke	Presenters of the awards for Best Costume Design
Debbie Reynolds	Presenter of the awards for Best Music Score — Substantially Original and Best Scoring of Music — Adaptation or Treatment
Anthony Franciosa	Presenter of the Scientific or Technical Awards
Rex Harrison	Presenter of the award for Best Foreign Language Film
Rosalind Russell	Presenter of the Honorary Award to William Tuttle
Karl Malden	Presenter of the award for Best Supporting Actress
Richard Chamberlain; Vince Edwards	Presenters of the award for Best Film Editing
Rock Hudson; Jean Simmons	Presenters of the awards for Best Cinematography
Elizabeth Ashley; Macdonald Carey	Presenters of the awards for Best Art Direction
Gene Kelly	Introducer of the performance of the tribute to Cole Porter
Fred Astaire	Presenter of the award for Best Song
Deborah Kerr	Presenter of the awards for Best Story and Screenplay Written Directly for the Screen and Best Screenplay Based on Material from Another Medium
Audrey Hepburn	Presenter of the award for Best Actor
Sidney Poitier	Presenter of the award for Best Actress
Joan Crawford	Presenter of the award for Best Director
Gregory Peck	Presenter of the award for Best Picture

=== Performers ===
Name	Role	Performed
Johnny Green; Roger Edens	Musical arrangers	Orchestral
The New Christy Minstrels	Performers	"Chim Chim Cher-ee" from Mary Poppins
Andy Williams	Performer	"Dear Heart" from Dear Heart
Patti Page	Performer	"Hush, Hush, Sweet Charlotte" from Hush...Hush, Sweet Charlotte
Nancy Wilson	Performer	"My Kind of Town" from Robin and the 7 Hoods
Jack Jones	Performer	"Where Love Has Gone" from Where Love Has Gone
Judy Garland	Performer	Cole Porter Medley: "Use Your Imagination" "Night and Day" "I Get a Kick Out of You" "You're the Top" "Let's Do It, Let's Fall in Love" "Don't Fence Me In" "You'd Be So Nice to Come Home To" "It's De-Lovely" "My Heart Belongs to Daddy" "So in Love" "From This Moment On" "Night and Day" (reprise)
Academy Awards Orchestra	Performers	"That's Entertainment" during the closing credits

== Multiple nominations and awards ==
These films had multiple nominations:

- 13 nominations: Mary Poppins
- 12 nominations: Becket and My Fair Lady
- 7 nominations: Hush...Hush, Sweet Charlotte and Zorba the Greek
- 6 nominations: The Unsinkable Molly Brown
- 4 nominations: Dr. Strangelove, or: How I Learned to Stop Worrying and Love the Bomb and The Night of the Iguana
- 3 nominations: Father Goose
- 2 nominations: The Americanization of Emily, A Hard Day's Night, Robin and the 7 Hoods, Seven Days in May, and What a Way to Go!

The following films received multiple awards.

- 8 wins: My Fair Lady
- 5 wins: Mary Poppins
- 3 wins: Zorba the Greek

== See also ==
- 22nd Golden Globe Awards
- 1964 in film
- 7th Grammy Awards
- 16th Primetime Emmy Awards
- 17th Primetime Emmy Awards
- 18th British Academy Film Awards
- 18th Tony Awards
