= Jigsaw (1968 film) =

1968 American mystery film directed by James Goldstone

- Directed by: James Goldstone
- Written by: Ranald MacDougall (as Quentin Werty); Peter Stone
- Story by: Ranald MacDougall
- Based on: Fallen Angel by Howard Fast
- Produced by: Ranald MacDougall
- Starring: Bradford Dillman; Harry Guardino; Michael J. Pollard; Susan Saint James; Hope Lange
- Cinematography: John L. Russell
- Music by: Quincy Jones
- Production company: Universal Pictures
- Distributed by: Universal Pictures
- Release date: June 5, 1968
- Running time: 97 minutes
- Country: United States
- Language: English

Jigsaw (also known as Jigsaw Murder) is a 1968 American mystery film directed by James Goldstone. It stars Harry Guardino and Bradford Dillman. This remake of Mirage (1965) was originally made for television but shown first in theaters.

The film was Diana Hyland's final theatrical film role before her death in March 1977. She did appear in some made-for-television films prior to her death.

== Plot ==
After someone places sugar cubes laced with LSD in his cup of coffee, Jonathan Fields regains consciousness, only to find a woman drowned in his bathtub and flecks of blood on his hands and clothes. Suffering from amnesia, Fields can't think of anywhere else to turn, so he hires Arthur Belding, a private detective, to help him find out what happened. Returning to work at a scientific think tank, Fields encounters a concerned woman who claims to be his sweetheart, Helen Atterbury, and a colleague who's been after his job, Lew Haley.

A hippie, Dill, and an accomplice kidnap Belding and attempt to drug him, but the detective escapes and recuperates with the help of Sarah, his girlfriend. He and Fields eventually discover that Dr. Edward Arkroyd, the head of the think tank who had been having a romantic affair with the murder victim, has been murdered as well, and that Haley is behind both the killings. A confrontation ensues between Fields and Haley . . . but that's not the end of the story when an angry henchman (Roy Jenson) also shows up.

== Cast ==
- Harry Guardino as Arthur Belding
- Bradford Dillman as Jonathan Fields
- Hope Lange as Helen Atterbury
- Pat Hingle as Lew Haley
- Diana Hyland as Sarah
- Susan Saint James as Ida
- Michael J. Pollard as Dill
- Victor Jory as Arkroyd

== See also ==
- List of American films of 1968
