= Nora Nicholson =

English actress (1886–1973)

Nora Nicholson in The Saint, 1966

Nora Nicholson (7 December 1886 (Note: In the 14th edition of Who's Who in the Theatre (1967), Nicholson gave her year of birth as 1892, but by the 15th edition (1972) she had modified it to 1889. It was common practice for actresses, and some actors, to prevaricate about their ages, but official records including the census returns for 1891 and 1901 and the England and Wales Civil Registration Death Index, 1916–2007 show the true year to be 1886 although her birth was not registered until early 1887 which has caused some confusion previously.) – 18 September 1973) was an English actress. Known for her portrayal of character roles, she achieved her greatest success in the later years of her career. She played in classics by Shakespeare and Chekhov and in new plays by authors including Noël Coward and Alan Bennett. Many of her best-regarded performances were as eccentric or even unhinged characters.

In 1914 Nicholson joined the Old Vic company, where she played several Shakespearean roles, and during 1916 and 1917, she played Sally in a long tour of The Scarlet Pimpernel. From the 1920s to the 1940s, she played a variety of character roles on stage in England, France and North America. She achieved wider notice in the West End in 1947 for her role in Dark Summer and was admired in both London and on Broadway in New York in The Lady's Not for Burning in 1949–50. She continued to be in demand for her stage roles into the 1970s.

From the 1950s she made regular television appearances and is particularly remembered for her part in the BBC's The Forsyte Saga (1967). She appeared in many British films, mostly comedies, but also in more serious films, including A Town Like Alice (1956). She continued to act until the year of her death.

== Life and career ==
=== Early years ===
Nora Miranda Marguerita Nicholson was born in Leamington, Warwickshire, the youngest child of the large family of the Rev John Aldwell Nicholson and his wife Editha, née Hunt. Among her siblings was the actor H. O. Nicholson. She was educated at Leamington High School where a fellow student was a daughter of the actor Frank Benson. After further education in Germany, Nicholson joined Benson's drama school before becoming a member of his company in 1912.

In April 1912 Nicholson made her professional stage debut, playing Dolly Clandon in Benson's production of Shaw's You Never Can Tell at the Shakespeare Memorial Theatre, Stratford-upon-Avon. She remained with Benson's company throughout the 1912–13 season, and in 1914 she joined the Old Vic company playing Ariel in The Tempest, Titania in A Midsummer Night's Dream, Jessica in The Merchant of Venice and Celia in As You Like It. The Stage said of her performance in The Tempest, "the rapidly and gracefull flitting Ariel of Miss Nora Nicholson partook indeed of the Spirit nature".

During 1916 and 1917 Nicholson toured as Sally in Fred Terry's stage version of The Scarlet Pimpernel, after which she served in the Women's Royal Naval Service, 1918–19. When she returned to the theatre after the war her career, according to her obituarist in The Times, "took a long time to develop".

=== Middle and later years ===
Between the wars Nicholson was constantly typecast in character parts that suited "her frail, eager, bright-eyed figure". She made her first West End appearance in 1919, playing two roles in a Christmas season play for children, Once Upon a Time. She had a few outstanding roles, among which were Charlotta, the governess, in The Cherry Orchard (1925), Mrs Debenham in the Broadway production of Rope (1929), and Miss Trafalgar Gower in Trelawny of the 'Wells' at the Old Vic (1938). Between these productions she played in London and on tour in England and Canada in a range of plays from Shakespeare to new drama. Among her more unusual productions during this period was a stage adaptation of The Well of Loneliness, banned in Britain and presented at the Théâtre de la Potinière in Paris in 1930.

During the Second World War Nicholson was a member of the Oxford Playhouse company, where she played one of her three favourite parts of her career, Mrs Boyle in Juno and the Paycock. (Note: The other two were Mrs Jones in Galsworthy's The Silver Box and Margaret in Christopher Fry's The Lady's Not for Burning.) She achieved local celebrity, but remained a lesser name in the West End. This changed in 1947, when her portrayal of a genteelly acid spinster in Wynyard Browne's Dark Summer established her as a leading character actress. Throughout the rest of her career Nicholson was cast in a succession of striking stage roles, including Margaret in The Lady's Not for Burning (1949, London, and 1950, New York), Miss Teresa in Graham Greene's The Living Room (New York, 1954), Ivy in T. S. Eliot's The Family Reunion (1956), Sarita in Noël Coward's Waiting in the Wings (1960), Avdotya Nazarovna in John Gielgud's production of Chekhov's Ivanov (1965), and Miss Nisbitt in Alan Bennett's Forty Years On (1968). Her last stage appearance was as the nurse in Ibsen's A Doll's House in 1973.

Nicholson was in demand for television and cinema work. She is best known as Juley Forsyte in the BBC's The Forsyte Saga (1967). Earlier she had played Clarissa Spenlow in a serial adaptation of David Copperfield (1956) and Miss Flite in Bleak House (1959). Her last television role was in 1973 as Catherine Alan in an adaptation of A Room with a View. Her cinema films included Tread Softly (1952), Raising a Riot (1955), The Hornet's Nest (1955), A Town Like Alice (1956), Law and Disorder (1958), The Captain's Table (1959), Dangerous Afternoon (1961), and Say Hello to Yesterday (1970).

In 1973, she published an autobiography, Chameleon's Dish described by The Times as "quietly witty and generous". (Note: Hamlet, Act 3, scene 2, line 95: "… of the chameleon's dish: I eat the air".) She died in London on 18 September of the same year, at the age of 86. There was a private burial service on 25 September, and a memorial service was held at Corpus Christi church, Maiden Lane, Covent Garden on what would have been her 87th birthday; Christopher Fry and Alan Bennett gave readings and Sir John Gielgud gave the address.

== Notes, references and sources ==
=== Sources ===
- Gaye, Freda, ed. (1967). Who's Who in the Theatre (fourteenth ed.). London: Sir Isaac Pitman and Sons. OCLC 5997224.
- Herbert, Ian, ed. (1972). Who's Who in the Theatre (fifteenth ed.). London: Sir Isaac Pitman and Sons. ISBN 978-0-273-31528-5.
- Parker, John, ed. (1925). Who's Who in the Theatre (fifth ed.). London: Sir Isaac Pitman and Sons. OCLC 10013159.
