= H. O. Nicholson =

English actor

Nicholson (r) as Dr Chasuble in The Importance of Being Earnest, 1923 revival, with Louise Hampton and Leslie Faber

Hubert Osbert Butler Nicholson (5 January 1868 – 22 September 1940), known professionally as H. O. Nicholson, was an English character actor of the first half of the 20th century.

== Life and career ==
Nicholson was born in Gothenburg, Sweden, the son of the Rev John Aldwell Nicholson and his wife, Editha Caroline, née Hunt. One of his siblings was the actress Nora Nicholson. He was educated at Leamington College and Jesus College, Cambridge, where he gained a classical scholarship in 1887, and took a second-class degree in the Classical Tripos of 1890.

After working as a schoolmaster Nicholson made his first professional stage appearance in Cork on 26 December 1896 in Frank Benson's company. He remained with the company almost continuously until 1911, making his London debut at the Lyceum Theatre as Nym in Henry V. In 1911 he made his first film appearance in Benson's cinematic adaptation of Richard III, filmed at the Shakespeare Memorial Theatre, Stratford upon Avon, as first murderer. His only other film role was Dr Nash in The Cornor House Burglary (1914). His acting career was interrupted by service in the armed forces during the First World War.

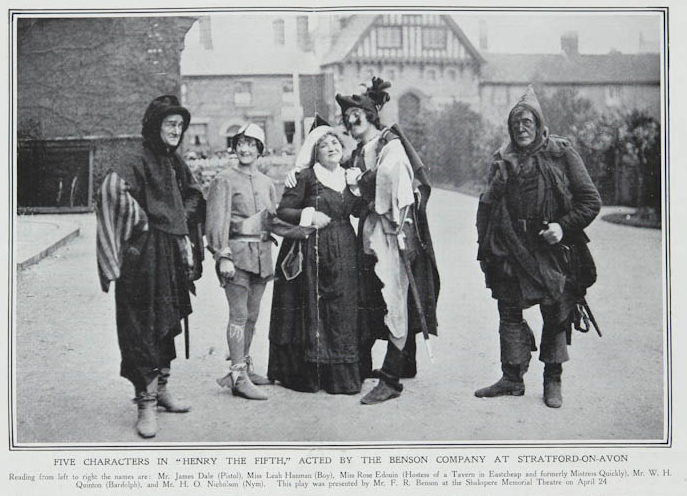
Shakespeare's Tercentenary Henry V 1916: James Dale, Leah Hanman, Rose Edouin, W. H. Quintin and H. O. Nicholson.

Nicholson's Shakespearean roles included Fabian, Starveling, Casca, Dogberry, Polonius, Shallow, and Old Adam. He appeared as Nym in Henry V at Stratford upon Avon during Shakespeare's Tercentenary in 1916. His other parts included the Centurion in Androcles and the Lion (1913), Sir Oliver Surface in The School for Scandal (1919), Old Hardcastle in She Stoops to Conquer (1922), Dr Chasuble in The Importance of Being Earnest (1923) and Brovik in The Master Builder (1932).

In addition to his main occupation as a stage actor, Nicholson was a frequent broadcaster on BBC radio. He appeared in variety programmes, documentaries and plays; his roles in the last included the Old Shepherd in The Winter's Tale, Junius Brutus in Coriolanus, Firs in The Cherry Orchard, Starveling in A Midsummer Night's Dream and parts in plays by Maurice Maeterlinck and Arthur Schnitzler. He is credited by Who's Who in the Theatre with having coined the name Walter Plinge as a stage pseudonym used when it would be undesirable or impossible for an actor to appear under his real name.

Nicholson died in London on 22 September 1940, aged 72.

== Notes, references and sources ==
=== Sources ===
- Parker, John, ed. (1939). Who's Who in the Theatre (ninth ed.). London: Sir Isaac Pitman and Sons. OCLC 473894893.
- Parker, John; Freda Gaye; Ian Herbert (1978). Who Was Who in the Theatre. Detroit: Gale Research. OCLC 310466458.
