= Walter Plinge =

British theatre actor pseudonym

Walter Plinge is a pseudonym, used in British theatres since the 19th century on occasions when it is not possible or desirable to make an actor's real name known.

== Name and usage ==
Walter Plinge is a pseudonym traditionally used in British theatres when a part has not been cast, an actor is playing two parts, or an actor does not want their name in the programme. The name has also been used in radio and television credits. Who's Who in the Theatre has this entry for the name:

"Plinge, Walter", actor; was discovered by the late H. O. Nicholson and first appeared with F. R. Benson's Shakespearean Company about 1898; was well-known in connection with minor parts in most of the plays of the extensive Benson repertory, and occasionally in other companies. Is related to "Mr. Bart" and "Mr. F. Anney" of the Benson Company, to "George Spelvin" (USA) and "A. N. Other" (Sport).

In 1939 Alfred Wareing, a former member of Benson's company, wrote in The Stage that the real Walter Plinge had been the landlord of the public house in Wellington Street near the stage door of the Lyceum Theatre, London. (Note: British birth and census records accessible through Ancestry UK show several men with the surname Plinge in the late 19th and early 20th centuries, although none of them is recorded as having the given name Walter.) Wareing recalled that Plinge was not entirely pleased at having his name used by Benson, particularly as the company already had other pseudonyms in use when needed. These included "R. Sherard" and "T. Ashman" – the latter used by among others Oscar Asche when doubling roles, although in Asche's case, according to Wareing, the false name "never deceived the knowing public". Another former Bensonian recalled the pseudonym "Hugh S. Hay" being used when the American actor Walter Hampden was in the company. The actor-manager Murray Carrington recalled that in the 1920s his company had featured not only Walter Plinge Jr. but also a female counterpart, Juliet Plinge.

The name Walter Plinge has been used occasionally in American theatre, where the more usual equivalent is "George Spelvin". Analogous pseudonyms – for writers rather than actors – are Alan Smithee in Hollywood and David Agnew at the BBC. From its earliest years the BBC has used "Walter Plinge" in its listings of acting roles, and "he" is the corporation's longest-serving broadcaster, having made his first broadcast in 1925, with subsequent appearances up to 2018.

Walter Plinge is also used as the name of a character in Terry Pratchett's novel Maskerade, which is a parody of opera and musical theatre. The character is an amalgam of two parts played by Michael Crawford: Frank Spencer and the Phantom of the Opera.

== Notes, references and sources ==
=== Sources ===
- Parker, John; Freda Gaye; Ian Herbert (1978). Who Was Who in the Theatre. Detroit: Gale Research. OCLC 310466458.
