= S. H. Barnett =

American screenwriter

- Born: Sanford Howard Barnett; September 19, 1908; East Orange, New Jersey, U.S.
- Died: April 14, 1988 (aged 79); Oxnard, California, U.S.
- Occupation: Screenwriter

Sanford Howard Barnett (September 19, 1908 – April 14, 1988) was an American screenwriter. He won an Academy Award in the category Best Original Screenplay for the film Father Goose.

== Early career ==
Barnett adapted many films and plays for the Lux Radio Theatre, where he first served as director then took over as head writer. He later wrote speeches and press releases for the Los Angeles Police Department, becoming the department's oldest non-sworn employee.

== Death ==
Barnett died on April 14, 1988, in Oxnard, California, at the age of 79.

== Selected filmography ==
- Father Goose (1964; co-won with Peter Stone and Frank Tarloff)
