= Andrew Leigh (actor) =

English actor and director (1887–1957)

Andrew George Leigh (30 November 1887 – 21 April 1957) was an English actor and director.

== Life and career ==
Andrew Leigh was born in Brighton on 30 November 1887, the son of a doctor – Thomas Leigh – and his wife Georgina née Geere. He was educated in Brighton and then worked for three years as secretary to the author and journalist T. H. S. Escott.

He made his first appearance on the stage at the Theatre Royal, Worthing, in September 1908, as Rugby in The Merry Wives of Windsor, with the F. R. Benson company, with which he remained for five years, playing numerous parts, including many of the Shakespearean clowns, and also acting as stage-manager. He made his first appearance in London at the Coronet Theatre in June 1913, as Dromio of Ephesus in The Comedy of Errors. In September 1914 he became a member of the first Shakespearean company at the Old Vic, first appearing there as Biondello in The Taming of the Shrew, acting as stage-manager, directing The Merry Wives of Windsor Twelfth Night and co-directing As You Like It.

After serving in the armed forces during the First World War he again appeared with the Benson company, and returned to the Old Vic as leading comedian, and, from 1924 to 1929, director, staging 38 Shakespearean and other productions. He appeared there again in 1935 as Kuligin in The Three Sisters and the following year as the Clown in The Winter's Tale. He appeared at the Stratford Memorial Theatre from 1937 to 1941, directing A Midsummer Night's Dream, King John and Julius Caesar,

The Stage said of him that he rarely appeared except in plays of distinction, and that besides excelling in comedy parts such as Launcelot Gobbo, Touchstone, Trinculo, Peter Quince, Christopher Sly and Tony Lumpkin he was memorable for his portrayals of, among others, Tesman in Hedda Gabler (with Mrs Patrick Campbell), Roper in The Silver Box, Androcles in Androcles and the Lion, the Inquisitor in Saint Joan and Hebble Tyson in The Lady's Not For Burning. His own favourite parts were both Shakespearean: the Fool in King Lear and Puck in A Midsummer Night's Dream.

Leigh died in Brighton on 21 April 1957, aged 69.

== Sources ==
- Parker, John, ed. (1947). Who's Who in the Theatre (tenth ed.). London: Sir Isaac Pitman and Sons. OCLC 225162446.
