= The Lady's Not for Burning =

Play by Christopher Fry

Cover first edition: Oxford University Press, 1949

The Lady's Not for Burning is a 1948 play by Christopher Fry.

A romantic comedy in three acts, in verse, it is set in the Middle Ages ("1400, either more or less or exactly"). It reflects the world's "exhaustion and despair" following World War II, with a war-weary soldier, Thomas Mendip, who wants to die, and an accused witch, Jennet, who wants to live. In form, it resembles Shakespeare's pastoral comedies.

It was performed at an Arts Theatre private club for two weeks in London in 1949 starring Alec Clunes, who had also commissioned it. Later that year John Gielgud took the play on a provincial tour followed by a successful London run at the Globe (now Gielgud) Theatre. Gielgud took the play to the United States, where it opened on Broadway at the Royale Theatre on 8 November 1950, with Pamela Brown as the female lead. Richard Burton and Claire Bloom had parts in the cast. It was revived on Broadway in 1983. In the United Kingdom, a reading was produced at the National Theatre in 2006 and it was fully revived in a production at the Finborough Theatre, London, in 2007.

== Characters and original casts ==
Character	Arts, London 10 March 1948	Globe, London 11 May 1948	Royale, NY 8 November 1950
Richard, an orphaned clerk	Derek Blomfield	Richard Burton	Richard Burton
Thomas Mendip, a discharged soldier	Alec Clunes	John Gielgud	John Gielgud
Alizon Eliot, fiancée of Humphrey	Daphne Slater	Claire Bloom	Claire Bloom
Nicholas Devize	Michael Gough	David Evans	David Evans
Margaret Devize, mother of Nicholas	Henzie Raeburn	Nora Nicholson	Nora Nicholson
Humphrey Devize, brother of Nicholas	Gordon Whiting	Richard Leech	Richard Leech
Hebble Tyson, the Mayor	Andrew Leigh	Harcourt Williams	George Howe
Jennet Jourdemayne	Sheila Manahan	Pamela Brown	Pamela Brown
Edward Tappercoom, a Justice	Peter Bull	Peter Bull	Peter Bull
The Chaplain	Frank Napier	Elliot Makeham	Elliot Makeham
Matthew Skipps	Morris Sweden	Esmé Percy	Esmé Percy

Source: Play text and Internet Broadway Database.

== Synopsis ==
Thomas Mendip, a world-weary recently discharged soldier, wants to be hanged. Visiting the house of Hebble Tyson, the mayor of Cool Clary, he explains this to the mayor's clerk, Richard, through a window. Alizon, the fiancée of the Mayor's nephew Humphrey, enters the room and she and Richard immediately feel a connection, although their conversation is interrupted by Thomas' asides. Shortly afterwards, Nicholas, Humphrey's brother, enters and declares that he has killed Humphrey in a battle over Alizon, and thus deserves her hand in marriage. Margaret, who is Mayor Tyson's sister and the mother of Nicholas and Humphrey, arrives. Nicholas and Richard are sent to get Humphrey from the garden, where he lies quite alive. Noises outside the house reveal a witch-hunt is in progress; Thomas repeatedly reminds everyone that he is there to be hanged, asking why his wish is ignored. The Mayor comes in and says that Thomas shall not be hanged without reason, prompting Thomas to claim that he has killed two people. The Mayor does not believe him. The accused witch, Jennet, then enters. After recounting her accusers' wild tales about her mystical powers, and laughing over their ludicrous nature, she is shocked to hear that the Mayor also believes them. The mayor sends Richard to get the constable to have her arrested, but Richard does not do so as he does not think she is a witch. The Chaplain enters next, apologizing for his lateness for evening prayers. Thomas claims to be the devil and that the world will soon end. The Mayor has both him and Jennet arrested.

Later on, the mayor and Tappercoom, the Justice, discuss the prisoners' unusual reactions to the mild tortures they are being put through; Jennet will not admit to any crimes at all, whilst Thomas continually admits to new ones. Margaret rushes in, horrified by the clamor the crowd outside is making about the alleged crimes of Thomas and Jennet. The Chaplain suggests inviting Thomas to the family's party that night, thinking that this will cheer Thomas up and make him leave. Despite the family's shock, the Justice considers the proposal. Meanwhile, Richard enters, somewhat drunk. He is depressed about Thomas and Jennet, and about his hopelessness over Alizon. He reveals that Humphrey and Nicholas were sitting in the cellar with Jennet, not saying a word. The mayor, still displeased with Richard's refusal to fetch a constable, commands him to scrub the floor. Nicholas enters, ecstatic and bloody, followed by Humphrey, who explains that Nicholas attempted to address the crowd and was hit by a brick. Margaret questions her boys on their contact with Jennet. Nicholas claims his own intentions were honorable, but disparages Humphrey's. Margaret takes Nicholas off to be cleaned up. To determine the guilt of the prisoners, the mayor proposes that he, Humphrey, Tappercoom, and the Chaplain hide upstairs and eavesdrop on Jennet and Thomas. Thomas talks about how awful humanity is, and Jennet explains that people think she's a witch because they claim that she turned Old Skipps, the same man that Thomas claims to have murdered, into a dog. They grow closer as they talk, and Jennet finally declares that she loves him, whether he's the devil or not. The Mayor re-enters with his company. Taking her declaration as an admission of guilt, he demands she be burned the next day. Thomas is outraged both at the sentence and the fact that he's being ignored, but the Justice proclaims him guilty only of being depressing and depressed, and sentences him to attend the party that night. Thomas reluctantly consents, provided that Jennet is also allowed to attend; he threatens to inform the whole countryside that the mayor and Tappercoom released a murderer if they don't agree. They do, as does Jennet, if somewhat despondently.

That evening, Thomas, Humphrey, and Nicholas are bored together, waiting for Jennet to be ready for the party. Margaret, vexed over Jennet's continued presence in her house, urges her sons to return to the festivities, but they decline. Jennet finally arrives, and the three men fight over who will accompany her; she goes with Humphrey, as he is the host. The mayor comes into the room, and tries to get Thomas to go away but he escapes into the garden. Tappercoom enters and mocks the mayor's complaints about Jennet's beauty and charm tempting him, reminding him that after she's dead they will possess her substantial property. The Chaplain enters, unhappy about his failure to play a dance at the party. Tappercoom takes him back to the party to cheer him up. Richard enters to speak to the mayor, but the latter proclaims that he's going to lock himself in his room until morning. Thomas re-enters and speaks with Richard about the sadness of the situation. Alizon arrives, and Thomas quickly goes back to the garden to give them privacy. When Richard half-heartedly defends the laws to Alizon, who is distraught over the unfairness of the burning, she says she loves him and not Humphrey. They agree to escape together and Richard rushes to get his savings. On leaving, he is stopped by Margaret, who is looking for Alizon, and misdirects her. Jennet, Humphrey, and Nicholas return from dancing. Richard is stopped once again, by Nicholas, who takes him to the cellar to get more wine. Humphrey's attempt to seduce Jennet in exchange for her life is stopped by Thomas. Jennet, upset, yells at Thomas, who admits his love for her. Nicholas re-enters, complaining that Richard locked him in the cellar. Margaret arrives, very befuddled and unable to comprehend what has been going on in her house. Thomas and Jennet reconcile, and she tells him she doesn't believe he is a murderer. Richard and Alizon return with Old Skipps, who everyone claimed was dead or a dog, and Humphrey and Nicholas bring Tappercoom and the chaplain. Richard and Alizon slip off whilst everyone is distracted by the old man. Tappercoom is satisfied that there is no witch or murderer, and Margaret sends her sons to take the very drunk old man home before leaving with the Chaplain. As he goes to bed, Tappercoom hints that Jennet and Thomas could quietly leave town before morning. Thomas, despite his continuing disgust with mankind, agrees to accompany Jennet to whatever new place she goes, and they escape into the night.

== Television adaptations ==
There have been at least four TV adaptations: 1950, starring Pamela Brown and Alec Clunes on BBC TV (further information is available through BBC Genome); 1958 (Omnibus, S06E29), with Christopher Plummer and Mary Ure; 1974, with Richard Chamberlain and Eileen Atkins, and 1987, with Kenneth Branagh and Cherie Lunghi.

== Critical reception ==
The review of opening night by Brooks Atkinson had the highest praise for the acting, while describing the playwright as precocious with "a touch of genius", but saying that the words were "sometimes soporific" and that the acting made the play. The play ran on Broadway through March 1951, and received the New York Drama Critics' Circle award as Best Foreign Play of 1950–51.

Looking back on the play's origins for The Guardian in 2003, Samantha Ellis began, "Now irrevocably associated with Margaret Thatcher's bad pun, Christopher Fry's verse drama about a medieval witch-hunt was a surprise hit, sparking a resurgence of poetic plays in the 1940s and 1950s". She noted that the cast of Gielgud's production later in 1949 was generally well received by theatre critics: "The Observer's Ivor Brown thought Gielgud 'happy, vigorous, enchanting', Burton 'most authentic' and Bloom 'as pretty as a May morning'. And in the Sketch, J. C. Trewin praised 'the concentrated intensity, the special flame of Pamela Brown'". But, she added, "it was the play they really took to. Fry, thought Trewin, had 'the relish of the Elizabethan word-men', while for The Daily Telegraph's W. A. Darlington, he was 'like a young Shaw, but with a poet's mind'". Ellis concluded by saying, "The Daily Mail's Cecil Wilson was one of the few dissenting voices: he thought the play a 'crazy quilt of verbiage', and wondered whether 'such fiendish cleverness [would] prove commercial'. It did: the play ran for nine months, then transferred to Broadway, where there were nine curtain calls on press night".

Reviewing a 2007 revival of the play, The Guardian's theatre critic Michael Billington noted, "Fry's pun-filled, semi-Shakespearean poetry may no longer be fashionable, but it has an exuberant charity that makes it irresistible. ... Fry's imagistic abundance may belong to the late 1940s, yet this play still has the power to charm". Kate Britten, considering the same production for The Stage, concluded that "the production shows that Fry's 50-year-old lyrical drama stands the test of time".

== See also ==
- The lady's not for turning, a speech by Margaret Thatcher

== Sources ==
- Fry, Christopher (1989). The Lady's Not For Burning. Oxford: Oxford University Press. ISBN 978-0-19-831959-7.
