= Androcles and the Lion (1967 film) =

1967 American TV special

- Genre: musical comedy
- Based on: Androcles and the Lion by George Bernard Shaw
- Written by: Peter Stone
- Directed by: Joe Layton
- Starring: Norman Wisdom; Noel Coward
- Composer: Richard Rodgers
- Country of origin: United States
- Original language: English

Production
- Executive producer: Marc Merson
- Running time: 90 mins
- Production company: NBC

Original release
- Network: NBC
- Release: November 15, 1967

Androcles and the Lion is a 1967 American TV special. It is a musical adaptation of the George Bernard Shaw play Androcles and the Lion.

It was adapted by Peter Stone and directed by Joe Layton. The songs were by Richard Rodgers. It starred Norman Wisdom who was seeking to work more in America.

== Plot ==
Androcles, a simple-hearted Christian tailor, becomes friends with a lion by removing a thorn from his paw.

Later, the lion saves Androcles and his friends from martyrdom in the Roman Colosseum.

== Cast ==
- Norman Wisdom as Androcles
- Inga Swenson as Lavinia
- Noël Coward as Caesar
- Ed Ames as Ferrovius
- Geoffrey Holder as Lion
- John Cullum as The Captain
- Brian Bedford as Lentulus
- Patricia Routledge as Magaera
- William Redfield as Metellus

== Production ==
NBC approached Richard Rodgers to write the music and he decided to be his own lyricist. Peter Stone, who wrote the book, said "It is amazing how many opportunities the play offers for musical comedy. I have added no new scenes although there are certain expansions to allow for musicalization. And I have not created any new characters. Shaw, who wrote the play 52 years ago, used contemporary language. There are no anachronisms and the jokes he used were modern."

The Shaw estate had to approve any changes to the text.

The show was taped in a studio in Brooklyn. Peter Stone felt the problem with the production was the direction of Joe Layton, whom Rodgers trusted. "He was very gifted and extremely smart and articulate, but what he always wanted was that a show be conceived by Joe Layton, and he came up with a conception that hurt Androcles terribly," said Stone. The writer said "he did it in such a way that there were no close-ups. It was all far away, and somehow it just had no energy. You couldn't cut it, because there was nothing to cut it against. Just these endless long shots, which on television in those days looked like little tiny figures."

== Reception ==
The Los Angeles Times called it "toothless". The New York Times said it "took unhappy toll of varied talents" and "wavered disconcertingly in its indecision over whether to be serious or to have fun" with a "lack of light touch in the staging".

Stone said "It was a failure, which was a shame because I thought the show as written was pretty good. First of all, it was a Shaw play, and how wrong can you get? And I thought Dick wrote some pretty good numbers in the Hammerstein mold."

Noel Coward later wrote in his diary "Joe Layton directed it very well, everyone was extremely nice, but I didn't enjoy any of it. I hate television anyway. It has all the nervous pressures of a first night with none of the response. However, I was apparently very good. "

Wisdom wrote in his memoirs, "it was an unusual role for me. No-one in Britain in a million years would have cast me as Androcles, but unexpected things happen in America. I enjoyed it — and I sang several numbers, including ‘Velvet Paws’ which was a nice catchy little piece. The show went out as planned, with an excellent critical reaction."

Richard Rodgers wrote in his memoirs, "The show itself didn't come off well, I'm afraid, but it did give me the chance to be professionally associated with Noel Coward, who played Julius Caesar as a wickedly charming Noel Coward."

== Soundtrack ==
Norman Wisdom and Ed Ames chatting during a recording break in late 1967.

A soundtrack album was released by RCA Victor right after the musical, with most cast members appearing in it. Billboard magazine commented that it "should be hot in demand from adults and children alike," adding that "Brilliantly written music is coupled with exquisitely delivered dialog and song."

== Songs ==
- "Velvet Paws" – Norman Wisdom
- "Follow in Our Footsteps" - Ed Ames and Chorus
- "Strangers" – Inga Swenson and John Cullum
- "Strength Is My Weakness" – Norman Wisdom and Ed Ames
- "The Emperor's Thumb" – Noël Coward
- "No More Waiting" – Inga Swenson and John Cullum
- "The Arena Pantomime" – Norman Wisdom and Orchestra
- "Don't Be Afraid Of An Animal" – Noël Coward and Norman Wisdom
