= Casals Conducts: 1964 =

1964 film

- Directed by: Larry Sturhahn
- Produced by: Mark Lawrence; Edward Schreiber
- Starring: Pablo Casals
- Cinematography: Frank J. Calabria
- Distributed by: Beckman Film
- Release date: 1964
- Running time: 20 minutes
- Country: United States
- Language: English

Casals Conducts: 1964 is a 1964 American short film directed by Larry Sturhahn. It is a documentary about the cellist and conductor Pablo Casals. It won an Oscar at the 37th Academy Awards in 1965 for Best Short Subject. The Academy Film Archive preserved Casals Conducts: 1964 in 2013.

== Cast ==
- Pablo Casals as Himself (archive footage)
