= Peter Stone (writer) =

American screenwriter (1930–2003)

- Born: Peter Hess Stone; February 27, 1930; Los Angeles, California, U.S.
- Died: April 26, 2003 (aged 73); Manhattan, New York, U.S.
- Education: Bard College (BA); Yale University (MFA)
- Spouse: Mary Hanley Stone

Peter Hess Stone (February 27, 1930 – April 26, 2003) was an American screenwriter and playwright. Stone is perhaps best remembered by the general public for the screenplays he wrote or co-wrote in the mid-1960s, Charade (1963), Father Goose (1964), and Mirage (1965).

== Early life and career ==
=== Early life ===
Peter Hess Stone was born in Los Angeles to Jewish parents. His mother, Hilda (née Hess), was a film writer, and his father, John Stone (born Saul Strumwasser), was a screenwriter and film producer. Hilda was a Bavarian Jew from Bamberg, but was born in Mexico (her father dodged the draft in the 1870s) and lived there for five years with her family until all foreign nationals were kicked out during the Mexican Revolution of 1910. Stone had an older brother David, who was a World War II veteran, serving in the U.S. Navy.

When Stone was 15, his parents took him to see Mexican Hayride starring Bobby Clark at the Hazard's Pavilion. Stone saw Clark throw his hat onto a hat tree 100 feet away, and, at that moment, knew he wanted to work in theatre.

He graduated from University High School in Los Angeles, Bard College starting in 1947, and earned a master's degree from the Yale School of Drama. While at Bard, Stone wrote two plays that were both produced and performed at the school.

=== Paris ===
After Stone graduated Bard, his mother Hilda (still married) eloped to Paris with a Hungarian literary agent (also married) named George Marton. While in Paris, they both settled their divorces and married each other. Stone describes this as "a really great opportunity came to me through what should have been emotionally wrenching, but wasn't", stating that his mother hated Hollywood and was finally happy. After visiting them in the late 1940s, Stone lived in and around Paris for about thirteen years.

Stone worked for CBS while overseas, as a radio writer and newsreader. He also did television features on subjects like the Arc de Triomphe horse race, the Cannes Film Festival and Princess Grace's wedding. "I was getting a sentimental education and letting Hollywood rub off me," he said later. Soon after this, Stone married Mary Hanley.

During this time Stone sold his first script to Studio One in 1956, "A Day Before Battle".

== Broadway and television ==
=== Kean ===
In 1953, Stone saw a play by Jean Paul Sartre called Kean, adapted from the play by Alexandre Dumas based on the life of Edmund Kean. The Broadway singer and actor Alfred Drake was keen to make Kean into a musical, so much so that his agent (who was also Stone's agent) became the producer. Stone signed on in December 1960.

On 2 November 1961 Kean premiered on Broadway, with music and lyrics by Robert Wright and George Forrest, and Stone as playwright. He was hesitant to write for a musical, even though he loved them and saw them: "I did not see myself as doing that...and then an opportunity arose...I just wanted to be on Broadway". Stone needed some help, so he consulted Frank Loesser. Stone said of him, "terribly talented, successful and sophisticated man", when asking Loesser where songs went and other questions about musical structure, and said he was "more than helpful, he was inspiring". The show only ran for 92 performances and was considered somewhat of a flop, but it helped establish Stone on Broadway.

=== Television ===
Stone wrote two episodes of the 1961 television series The Asphalt Jungle ("The Friendly Gesture", "The Scott Machine") and three episodes of The Defenders. One of his Defenders episodes, "The Benefactors", dealt with abortion care providers and was highly controversial, resulting in sponsors leaving the show. The New York Times called it "a remarkable demonstration of the use of theatre as an instrument of editorial protest." Stone won an Emmy for his script.

He also wrote episodes of Espionage ("Covenant with Death") and Brenner ("Laney's Boy", "The Tragic Flute").

== Charade and working for Universal ==
Stone's first film script was Charade (1963), which he turned into a novel at the suggestion of his agent Robert Lantz. Stone said he submitted his original script "everywhere and nobody wanted it". After it was made into a novel, it was published, and portions of it were even printed before publication in Redbook.

Stone sold the script to Stanley Donen, whom he chose because "One, was he was the only person who hadn't seen it before and I felt silly selling it to the people who rejected it. Two, It got me out of New York, which at that point I wanted to, I'd been there a long time with Kean. And three, Stanley got stars, and I had written with Cary Grant and Audrey Hepburn in mind". "I was on the set every day," Stone remembered, "and I had a marvelous time. There were very few hands involved. It was just Stanley (Donen, the director) and me and the actors, and we all worked it out together. It was an absolutely grand experience."

Universal, which made Charade, promptly signed Stone to write two more films: Mirage, based on a novel by Howard Fast, and Father Goose (1964), based on a story by Frank Tarloff, which Stone wrote at the behest of Cary Grant, who wanted to star.

When Charade came out it was a huge success. Stone signed an exclusive five-picture deal with Universal Studios. Father Goose was made before Mirage. It earned Stone his one and only Oscar for Best Screenplay; he shared it with Tarloff. According to one of his obituaries, "Some felt that the honor was, in part, a delayed tribute for the overlooked Charade script."

Stone's work in the 1960s employed Hitchcock-like narratives, even while the director was still an active film maker. Hitchcock's influence is especially evident in the Edward Dmytryk-directed Mirage, a suspense-mystery that Stone adapted from the Howard Fast novel Fallen Angel. The narrative has Peck suffering from "unconscious amnesia" while dodging bullets in downtown New York. Although shot in black-and-white, many of its themes and images are reminiscent of Vertigo. The cast included Walter Matthau and George Kennedy from Charade.

Stone was reunited with Stanley Donen on Arabesque which also starred Gregory Peck. Stone was brought on to the film to "trick up the dialogue of somebody else's script... so that nobody would notice the film didn't make sense." Stone was unhappy with his low billing and used the pseudonym 'Pierre Marton' on the credits (literally 'Peter/stone' in French, plus an homage to his stepfather George Marton).

Stone wrote some scripts which were not made, including The Expert (1964) written with Theodore Flicker, who had been his roommate at Bard College.

Stone's contract with Universal enabled him to continue to write for theatre. He had a minor hit on Broadway with the musical Skyscraper (1965–66) with Julie Harris, that went for 248 performances. Stone later called it "A terrific idea, but it never jelled." "People don't know what a book is", he said later. "They think it's the jokes. Well, everybody knows the actors make those up as they go along. A book is a concept and a structure, and dialogue is the smallest part... You can have the best score in the world, but if the book is weak, it won't work. On the other hand, if the book is good, it can carry a mediocre score."

Stone scripted a pilot for a TV series, Ghostbreakers (1967), that was not picked up. He adapted Androcles and the Lion (1967) for TV, starring Noël Coward and directed by Joe Layton and wrote the book for a musical, The Games People Play, with Feuer and Martin, based on the best-selling text book (it ended up not being produced).

"I think I've always had an appetite for a certain kind of urbane comedy", he said in a 1967 interview. "But I don't believe comedy in and of itself is an end."

Stone wrote a series of films for Universal: The Secret War of Harry Frigg (1968), a World War Two comedy with Paul Newman (co written with Tarloff); Jigsaw (1968), a mystery with Bradford Dillman; the film adaptation of the musical Sweet Charity (1969), directed by Bob Fosse, which was an unexpected box office flop; and what ultimately became Skin Game (1971).

== 1776 ==
Stone wrote the book for the Broadway musical 1776 (1969–72) which went for 1,217 performances. It won the Tony Award for Best Musical and Stone won the Drama Desk Award for Best Book.

Stone continued to write scripts at Universal, doing work on Skin Game and writing a story about black-white relations that was ultimately never made, The Ornament.

He did some uncredited script doctoring on the book for the stage musical Georgy (1970), which was credited to Tom Mankiewicz. Then he wrote another musical, Two by Two (1970–71) which starred Danny Kaye with songs by Rodgers. It ran for 351 performances.

Stone was unhappy with the changes made to his script for Skin Game (1971) (eventually made by Warners), which he said were caused by James Garner, who starred and produced, changing the last third of the film, which Stone wanted to focus on co-star Louis Gosset. Stone again used his "Pierre Marton" pseudonym saying "it was the only thing you can do in a situation like that."

A happier creative experience was the film of 1776 (1972) where he adapted his own book into a screenplay. It was a box office failure.

Stone had another Broadway hit with the book for the musical Sugar (1972–73), an adaptation of Some Like It Hot, produced by David Merrick and directed by Gower Champion. Stone replaced original book writer George Axelrod. It ran for 505 performances and had a popular life aftwards. Stone later said "It's probably the most successful stock and amateur [property] I've ever done — especially foreign [licensing]. There are two guys everywhere in the world who wanna get in a dress. And this is the one show they can get into a dress without being gay — they're on the run! It's terribly attractive to two actors, so it's constantly done."

Less successful was the only non-musical he did on Broadway, Full Circle (1973) based on the novel by Erich Maria Remarque and directed by Otto Preminger. It only ran 21 performances.

== Focus on screenwriting ==
Stone returned to TV for a small screen adaptation of the Katharine Hepburn-Spencer Tracy 1949 film, Adam's Rib (1973). Stone wrote episodes, including the pilot, and worked as a producer. However the show only had a short run.

He wrote the pilot for Pat and Mike, based on another Tracy-Hepburn film, but it was not turned into a series.

Stone wrote the film adaptation of the train hijacking novel The Taking of Pelham One Two Three (1974). He worked on some scripts that were ultimately not produced including The Leavenworth Irregulars, The Grand Defiance, and The Ornament, as well as a musical that was not made, Subject to Change. He did some uncredited doctoring on the show Goodtime Charley (1975) and wrote the TV movie One of My Wives Is Missing (1976), a thriller starring Jack Klugman, using the Pierre Marton pseudonym again.

Stone wrote the feature films Silver Bears (1977), Who Is Killing the Great Chefs of Europe? (1978), with George Segal, and Why Would I Lie? (1980) with Treat Williams.

He wrote some unfilmed scripts around this time called Csardas, The Late Great Creature, and The Day They Kidnapped Queen Victoria.

=== Return to Broadway ===
In 1980, Stone was working on a musical about the Algonquin Round Table but it was not made. Stone returned to Broadway with the book of the musical adaptation of Woman of the Year (1981–83) starring Lauren Bacall which ran for 770 performances. Stone won the Tony Award for Best Book of a Musical for his efforts. Also successful was My One And Only (1983–85) where Stone wrote the book with the music of George Gershwin. Starring Tommy Tune and Twiggy it went for 767 performances.

Stone wrote the TV movie Grand Larceny (1987). In 1988 he wrote "Baby on Board" for CBS Summer Playhouse.

Stone did some uncredited script doctoring on the book for the musical Grand Hotel (1989) at the request of director Tommy Tune. He was a writer for The 44th Annual Tony Awards (1990) and The 46th Annual Tony Awards (1992). He wrote the book for The Will Rogers Follies (1991–93) which went for 981 performances. It won the Tony for Best musical, and Stone's book was nominated.

== Later career ==
Stone wrote Just Cause (1996), a thriller film starring Sean Connery. He worked on the books for some musicals that were ultimately not made, Love Me Love My Dog and a musical with Michael Jackson.

Stone wrote the book for the musical Titanic (1997–99) with music and lyrics by Maury Yeston which had a troublesome preproduction period but ultimately ran for 804 performances and swept the Tonys with five wins, including Stone who won a Tony for his book.

"I love it when a show I'm working on is in trouble", Stone said around this time. "I'm an ardent puzzle doer, and I love solving the puzzle of it. I like the process. I don't like being in trouble in New York; nothing pleases the theatrical community more than knowing that a show is in trouble. And maybe had they succeeded--and the show was very nearly destroyed by it--it might have been discouraging. But they lost and we won."

He had given up screenwriting by this time saying "I miss writing them, but I don't miss what happens to them after you write them. Stars are now the producers, because they are the motivating force to what gets done--half Jim Carrey's salary is the entire budget for 'Titanic'--and stars don't have the slightest clue of how to rewrite anything. It hurts the pictures terribly. Minutes after the script leaves my computer, it's best I be put to sleep."

He said he hoped to write three or four more musicals. "'The Peter Principle'--this notion that as soon as you get good at something, you're promoted to something you're not good at--isn't going to work here," he said. "I'm good at writing book musicals and I'm going to keep writing them. I know I'm not going to sit down and write the Great American Play, but I hope to do the Great American Musical. Maybe I've already done it."

Stone had one last Broadway hit with a 1999 revival of Annie Get Your Gun, where Stone revised the book. It ran for 1045 performances.

When Charade was remade as The Truth About Charlie, Stone was credited on-screen as 'Peter Joshua', one of the names used by Cary Grant in the original film.

=== Dramatists Guild presidency ===
For 18 years, Stone served as the member-elected president of the Dramatists Guild of America from 1981 to March 24, 1999. He resigned his presidency so a "new crew could take over."

== Death and postmortem ==
Stone died of pulmonary fibrosis on April 26, 2003, in Manhattan, New York. He was survived by his wife, Mary, and brother, David. On February 27, 2004, shortly after his death, he was posthumously inducted into the American Theater Hall of Fame. Honoring him at the induction ceremony was his close friend, actress Lauren Bacall.

Shortly after Stone's death, in a memorial ceremony held June 30, 2003, at the Richard Rodgers Theatre, it was observed that the two most famous ships of all time were Noah's Ark and the Titanic, and that Stone had written Broadway musicals about both of them (Noah's Ark being the topic of Two by Two).

=== Posthumous ===
Stone had a posthumous success on Broadway with Curtains (2007–08) based on his original book. It ran for 511 performances.

In 2011, one of his projects was completed with Thomas Meehan, and Death Takes a Holiday was produced off-Broadway with a score by Maury Yeston.

Before his death he revised the book to Finian's Rainbow for a planned Broadway production that never made it beyond its tryout, and worked on the musical, Love Me, Love My Dog with Jimmy Webb that was never made.

== Awards ==
Stone is among the small group of writers who have won acclaim in stage, screen, and television by winning a Tony, an Oscar, and an Emmy. In 1964, Stone won an Edgar Award from the Mystery Writers of America for his screenplay for Charade.

Stone was nominated for the Tony Award for Best Book of a Musical five times (winning for Woman of the Year and Titanic) and for the Drama Desk Award for Outstanding Book of a Musical three times (winning for 1776 and posthumously for his contribution to Curtains).

== Television ==
- The Asphalt Jungle
- The Defenders
- One Of My Wives Is Missing
- Androcles and the Lion (1967 film)

== Film ==
- Charade
- Father Goose
- Mirage
- Arabesque
- Skin Game
- 1776
- The Taking of Pelham One Two Three
- Who Is Killing the Great Chefs of Europe?
- Just Cause

== Theater ==
- Kean – 1961
- Skyscraper – 1965
- 1776 – 1969
- Two by Two – 1970
- Sugar – 1972
- Full Circle – 1973
- Woman of the Year – 1981
- My One and Only – 1983
- The Will Rogers Follies – 1991
- Titanic – 1997
- Annie Get Your Gun (revised book) – 1999
- Curtains (original book and concept) – 2006
- Death Takes a Holiday (original book, with Thomas Meehan) – 2011
