= Androcles and the Lion (play) =

1912 play by George Bernard Shaw

- Androcles (O. P. Heggie) and the Lion (Edward Sillward): 1913 premiere
- Written by: George Bernard Shaw
- Date premiered: 1913
- Place premiered: St James's Theatre, London
- Subject: A Christian is saved by his devotion to an animal
- Genre: epic pastiche
- Setting: Ancient Rome

Androcles and the Lion (Shavian: ·𐑨𐑯𐑛𐑮𐑩𐑒𐑤𐑰𐑟 𐑯 𐑞 𐑤𐑲𐑩𐑯) is a 1912 play by Bernard Shaw. The play is Shaw's retelling of the tale of Androcles, a slave who is saved by the requiting mercy of a lion. In the play, Shaw portrays Androcles as one of many Christians being led to the Colosseum to die but surviving because the lion who was intended to tear him apart recognised him as the man who once extracted an agonising thorn from his paw.

== Background and first production ==
Shaw wrote Androcles and the Lion as a counterblast to two plays of which he disapproved: Wilson Barrett's The Sign of the Cross – written in 1895 but still highly popular nearly twenty years later – and J. M. Barrie's Peter Pan. Shaw disliked the religious melodrama of the first, and thought the second appealed greatly to adults but bored children to sleep. He said he wanted "to show Barrie how a play for children should be handled". He based the plot of his play on a fable written by the Roman writer Aulus Gellius in the second century AD.

The play, directed by Harley Granville-Barker, opened at the St James's Theatre, London, on 1 September 1913. It ran for 66 performances.

== Characters and original cast ==
- The Emperor – Leon Quartermaine
- The Captain – Ben Webster
- Androcles – O. P. Heggie
- The Lion – Edward Sillward
- Lentulus – Donald Calthrop
- Metellus – Hesketh Pearson
- Ferrovius – Alfred Brydone
- Spintho – J. P. Outram
- Centurion – H. O. Nicholson
- The Editor – Herbert Hewetson
- The Call Boy – Neville Gartside
- Secutor – Allan Jeayes
- Retiarius – J. P. Turnbull
- The Menagerie Keeper – Baliol Holloway
- The Slave Driver – Ralph Hutton
- Magaera – Clare Greet
- Lavinia – Lillah McCarthy

== Plot ==
Androcles, a fugitive Christian tailor, accompanied by his nagging wife, Magaera, is on the run from his Roman persecutors. While hiding in the forest he comes upon a wild lion who approaches him with a wounded paw. His wife runs off. Androcles sees that the cause of the animal's distress is a large thorn embedded in its paw, which he draws out while soothing the lion in baby language.

Androcles is captured and is sent to the Colosseum to be executed with other Christians in gladiatorial combat. They are joined by a new Christian convert called Ferrovius, who struggles to reconcile his Christian principles with his violent inclinations. The Roman captain guarding them is attracted to the genteel convert Lavinia. Eventually the Christians are sent into the arena, but Ferrovius kills all the gladiators before they can harm any Christians. He is offered a job in the Praetorian Guard, which he takes. The Christians are to be released, but the crowd demands blood. To satisfy them, Androcles offers himself to be savaged by lions. But the lion that is supposed to kill him turns out to be the one that Androcles saved, and the two dance around the arena to the delight of the crowd. The emperor comes into the arena to get a closer look, and the lion attacks him. Androcles calls him off and the emperor is saved. He then declares an end to the persecution of Christians. Androcles and his new 'pet' depart together.

Final scene, 1913 premiere

== Revivals ==
- Harley Granville-Barker directed the first Broadway production of the play in 1915 with two of the original West End cast – Heggie and McCarthy – reprising their roles.
- The Theatre Guild presented the play at the Klaw Theatre in 1925 with Henry Travers as Androcles and Edward G. Robinson as Caesar.
- At the Old Vic in 1930 Richard Riddle played Androcles and John Gielgud the Emperor.
- The Regent's Park Open Air Theatre staged the play in July 1934. The production transferred to the West End in September. Andrew Leigh played Androcles and Oscar Asche played Caesar.
- A 1938 production by the Federal Theatre Project in New York featured Dooley Wilson as Androcles and Maurice Ellis as Caesar.
- At the Arts Theatre in 1943 Denys Blakelock was Androcles and Geoffrey Dunn as Caesar.
- In 1946 the American Repertory Theatre company staged the work in New York, with Ernest Truex as Androcles and Philip Bourneuf as Caesar.
- A revival at the Mermaid Theatre in 1961 Davy Kaye played Androcles and Ronald Fraser played the Emperor.
- A second Regent's Park production, in August 1980 featured Chris Harris as Androcles and James Cairncross as Caesar.
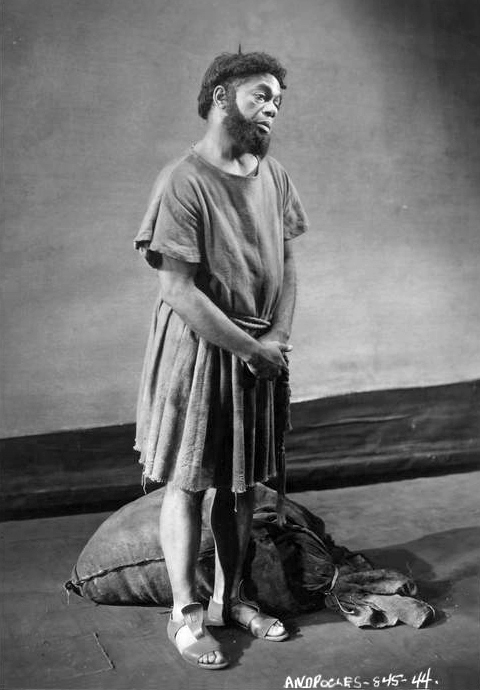
Dooley Wilson as Androcles in the 1938 Federal Theatre Project production

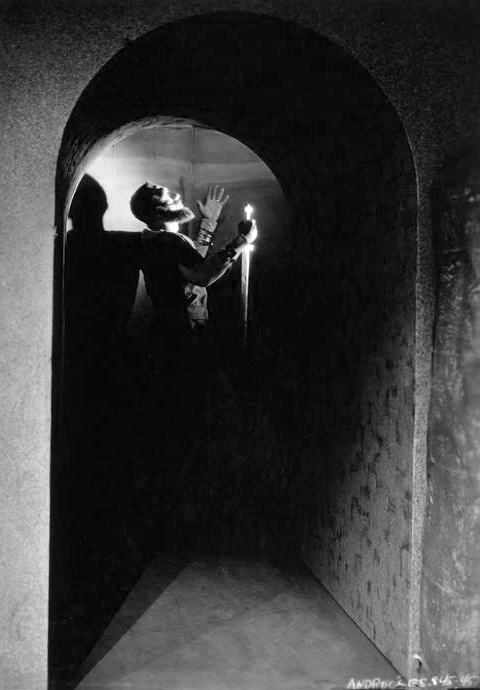
Daniel L. Haynes as Ferrovius, lighting design by Abe Feder

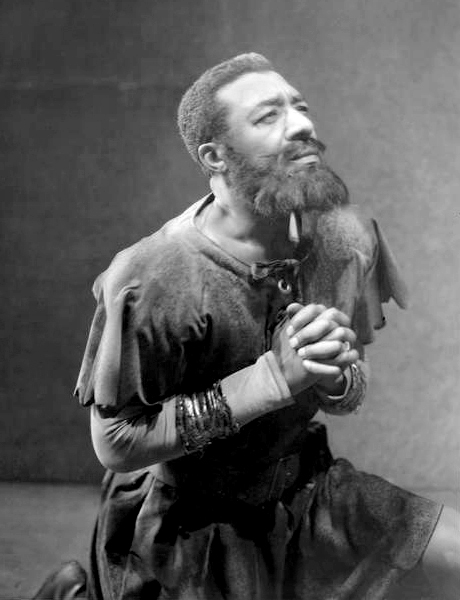
Daniel L. Haynes as Ferrovius

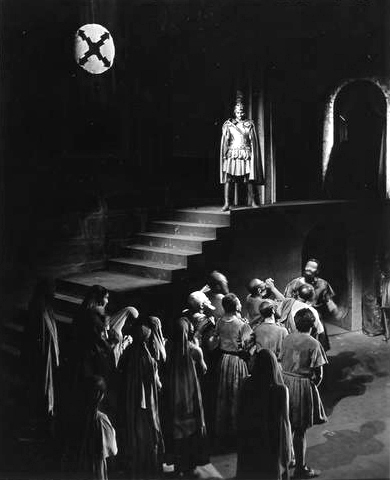
Scene from the 1938 Federal Theatre Project production

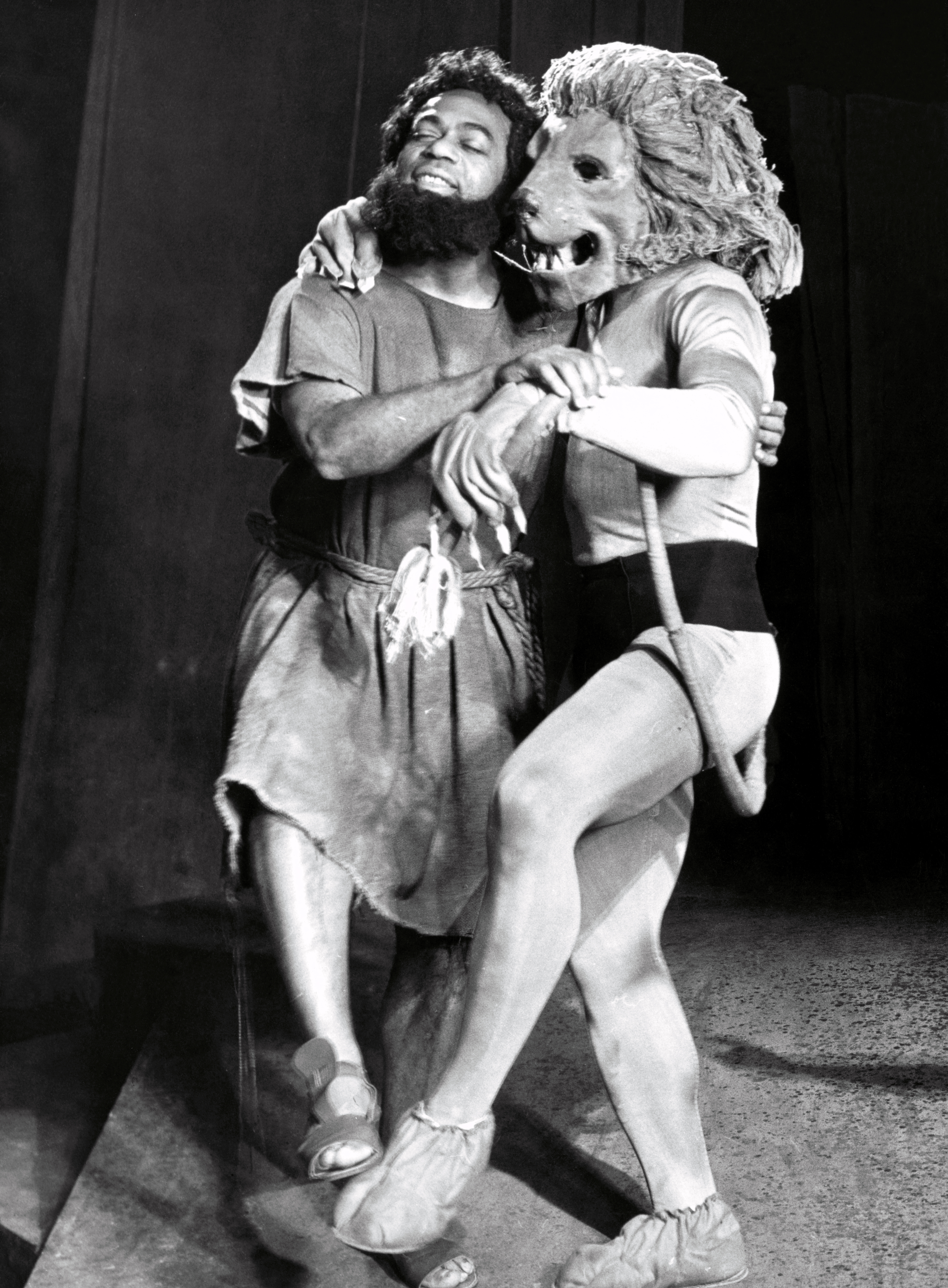
Dooley Wilson (Androcles) and Add Bates (Lion)

== Adaptations ==
=== Radio ===
- 1941: with Ivor Barnard as Androcles and Frederick Lloyd as Caesar
- 1942: with Ivor Barnard and Bruce Wilton
- 1946: with Andrew Leigh and Francis L. Sullivan
- 1967: with Leslie French and Heron Carvic

=== Television ===
- 1946: with Andrew Leigh and Ernest Thesiger
- 1951: with Toke Townley and Raymond Lovell
- 1960: with Roderick Cook and Peter Bull
- 1984: with Billy Connolly and Peter Copley

=== Cinema ===
A film version, Androcles and the Lion, was made of the play in 1952, produced by Gabriel Pascal.

=== Musical ===
Richard Rodgers wrote the music and lyrics for a televised 1967 musical adaptation, with Norman Wisdom as Androcles and Noël Coward as Caesar.

== Sources ==
- Dukore, Bernard (1996). Bernard Shaw and Gabriel Pascal. Toronto: University of Toronto Press. ISBN 0-8020-3002-5.
- Gaye, Freda (1967). Who's Who in the Theatre (fourteenth ed.). London: Sir Isaac Pitman and Sons. OCLC 5997224.
- Holroyd, Michael (1997). Bernard Shaw: The One-Volume Definitive Edition. London: Chatto & Windus. ISBN 978-0-7011-6279-5.
- Hyland, William (1998). Richard Rodgers. New Haven: Yale University Press. OCLC 1036825458.
- Wearing, J. P. (2014). The London Stage, 1910–1919: A Calendar of Players and Plays. New Jersey: Scarecrow Press. ISBN 978-0-8108-1596-4.
