= Father Goose (film) =

1964 romantic comedy film by Ralph Nelson

- Film poster
- Directed by: Ralph Nelson
- Written by: Peter Stone; Frank Tarloff
- Based on: A Place of Dragons short story by S. H. Barnett
- Produced by: Robert Arthur
- Starring: Cary Grant; Leslie Caron; Trevor Howard
- Cinematography: Charles Lang
- Edited by: Ted J. Kent
- Music by: Cy Coleman
- Production company: Granox Productions
- Distributed by: Universal Pictures
- Release date: December 10, 1964
- Running time: 118 minutes
- Country: United States
- Language: English
- Box office: $12.5 million

Father Goose is a 1964 American Technicolor romantic comedy film set in World War II, starring Cary Grant, Leslie Caron and Trevor Howard. The title is a play on the children's fiction character of "Mother Goose," which is used as a code name assigned to the coastwatcher character played by Grant. Based on a story A Place of Dragons by Sanford Barnett, the film won an Oscar for Best Original Screenplay. It introduced the song "Pass Me By" by Cy Coleman and Carolyn Leigh, later recorded by Peggy Lee, Frank Sinatra and others.

== Plot ==
While the Royal Australian Navy evacuates Salamaua, Papua New Guinea, in February 1942 ahead of a Japanese invasion, Commander Frank Houghton coerces an old friend, American beachcomber Walter Eckland, into becoming a coastwatcher for the Allies. When the misanthropic Eckland initially refuses to involve himself in the war, Houghton orders Eckland's cabin cruiser confiscated. Rather than lose the boat, Eckland reluctantly agrees to go to deserted Matalava Island, not intending to stay. Houghton's ship escorts Eckland to the island to watch for Japanese airplanes. To motivate the alcoholic Eckland, Houghton has his crew hide bottles of Scotch whisky around the island, rewarding each confirmed aircraft sighting with directions to one. To ensure that Eckland stays put, Houghton has his ship "accidentally" knock a hole in his cabin cruiser while departing, leaving him only a utility dinghy to get around in.

As encircling Japanese forces threaten another nearby coast watcher, Houghton entices Eckland over the radio to use the small motorized dinghy on open sea to rescue his replacement. In return, Eckland extorts the location of all hidden whisky. Upon arrival, he encounters Frenchwoman Catherine Freneau and seven schoolgirls (British, French, and Australian) under her care, left stranded after escaping from Rabaul. The coast watcher, killed in an air raid, had been buried by Freneau. Eckland reluctantly takes the troop back to Matalava.

Due to Japanese activity, Houghton informs Eckland that he must put up with the eight refugees for weeks before evacuation. The disgruntled Eckland refuses to share his hut or spare personal provisions with them. Freneau instructs the girls in tactics to appropriate the hut and supplies. Hiding his whisky supplies, Freneau clashes with Eckland, whom she decries to Houghton as "a rude, foul-mouthed, drunken, filthy beast." In return, Eckland dubs Freneau "Miss Goody Two Shoes". Eventually, Eckland settles into a grudging détente with the group, as the girls find helping fix his boat fun. One by one, he befriends the girls, becoming pals with the outgoing tomboyish "Harry" and even getting the traumatized Jenny to speak again.

When the girls frantically report that Freneau has been bitten by a snake, Houghton confirms that all species on the island are deadly venomous and commences a vigil over her. To ease her pain, he is advised to administer an "analgesic sedative". In an alcohol-induced exchange of confidences, Eckland discloses that formerly a history professor, he turned reclusive over academia's obsession with conformity over ideas. Freneau reveals a broken engagement to a suitor who asked her permission to kiss her. When she passes out, Eckland mistakenly believes she has succumbed, only to learn she had merely been pricked by a thorny stick that looked like a snake.

The group has a near miss when Japanese sailors come to the island looking for sea turtles, narrowly missing two children playing on the beach who Eckland furtively rescues. When teenaged Elizabeth develops a crush on Eckland, he scares her off with exaggerated mocking enthusiasm. Freneau and Eckland argue over his handling of the situation, with him accusing her of being too controlling for any man to tolerate. Their squabbling leads to passion. Realizing they are in love, the couple arranges to be married by a military chaplain via radio. The marriage ceremony is interrupted by a Japanese air attack, but the couple exchanges vows. Houghton arranges for an American submarine to evacuate them the following morning. The couple spends their honeymoon night on the beach with the girls, waiting for a signal from the submarine.

Before the rescue submarine arrives, a Japanese patrol boat returns. Ordering Freneau and the girls into his dinghy, Eckland heads out to sea in his newly repaired cruiser in the opposite direction to draw the Japanese away. The arriving submarine torpedoes the Japanese patrol boat, but before the torpedoes can hit their mark, Eckland's cruiser is blown up. Fortunately, Eckland had lashed its wheel and jumped overside before the cruiser was hit.

To his wife's and the girls' relief and joy, Eckland pops up alongside the dinghy. Ignoring Freneau's instructions, he overturns the dinghy as he attempts to climb aboard, in the process putting them all in the water, where they are rescued by the submarine.

== Cast ==
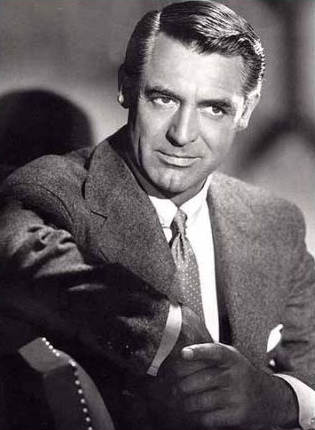
Cary Grant plays Walter Eckland

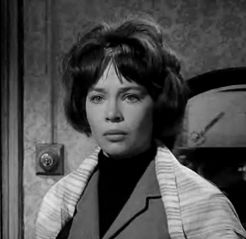
Leslie Caron plays Catherine Freneau

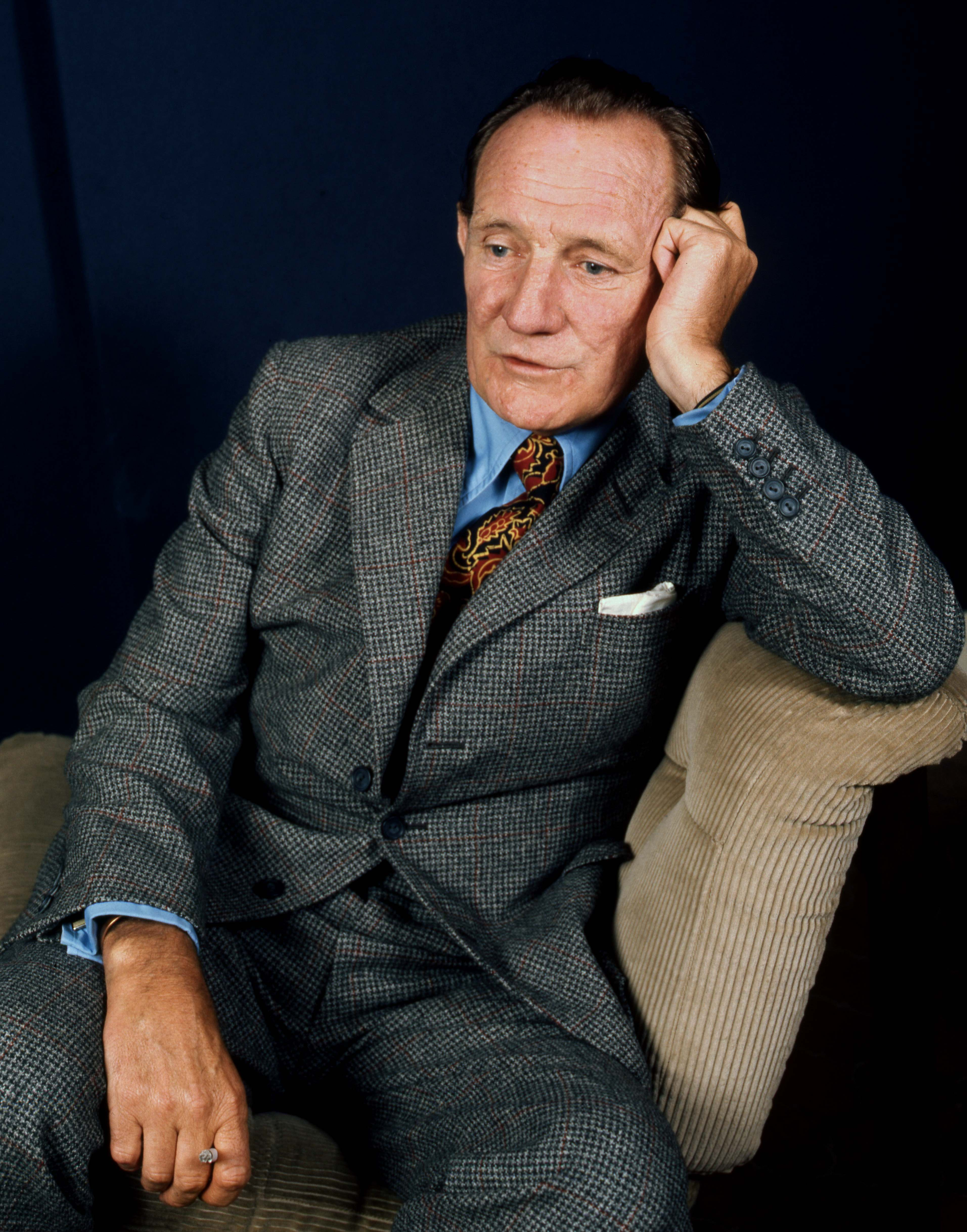
Trevor Howard plays Commander Frank Houghton

- Cary Grant as Walter Christopher Eckland
- Leslie Caron as Catherine Louise Marie Ernestine Freneau
- Trevor Howard as Commander Frank Houghton
- Jack Good as Lieutenant Stebbings
- Peter Forster as the chaplain
- Simon Scott as submarine captain
- Ken Swofford as submarine helmsman

The children:

- Sharyl Locke as Jenny
- Pip Sparke as Anne
- Verina Greenlaw as Christine
- Stephanie Berrington as Elizabeth Anderson
- Jennifer Berrington as Harriet "Harry" MacGregor
- Laurelle Felsette as Angelique
- Nicole Felsette as Dominique

== Production ==
The film was based on a short story by S Barnett called A Place of Dragons. Producer Hal Chester hired Frank Tarloff, with whom he had worked on School for Scoundrels, to write the screenplay. Tarloff turned the project down at first calling it "a poor man's African Queen", but changed his mind. Originally the film was going to be a "small British picture" directed by Cy Endfield, who like Tarloff was an American blacklistee living in England. Tarloff added the children, who were not in the original story. Chester then sold the project to Universal, although they refused to let Chester produce.

According to the New York Times, Cary Grant was given the original story by an executive at Universal who liked it. He passed it along to Peter Stone, who told him he wanted to write the screenplay. Grant then arranged for Stone to be signed to Father Goose; Stone's contract called for a picture a year for five years.

At one stage, David Miller was going to direct but that job eventually went to Ralph Nelson.

There were a number of films and TV shows in the early 1960s that featured coastwatcher characters, in part due to the fact President John F. Kennedy's life had been saved by a coastwatcher during World War Two.

Father Goose was filmed on location in Jamaica. Filming began in May 1964.

The Japanese patrol vessel at the end of the film was portrayed by a former U.S. Coast Guard wood hull 83-foot WPB patrol boat. Director Ralph Nelson stated he tried to avoid professional child actors; with the exception of Verina Greenlaw ("Christine") he succeeded.

== Reception ==
=== Box office ===
The film grossed $12.5 million at the domestic box office, earning $6 million in US theatrical rentals.

=== Critical ===
In its contemporary review, Variety was positive: "Cary Grant comes up with an about-face change of character.... [He] plays an unshaven bum addicted to tippling and tattered attire, a long way from the suave figure he usually projects but affording him opportunity for nutty characterization. Leslie Caron and Trevor Howard are valuable assists to plottage...."

Bosley Crowther, The New York Times critic, considered it "a cheerfully fanciful fable" and "some harmless entertainment". Of the title character, he wrote, "It is not a very deep character or a very real one, but it is fun."

== Awards and nominations ==
S. H. Barnett, Peter Stone, and Frank Tarloff won the Oscar for Best Writing, Story and Screenplay, which was written directly for the screen. Ted J. Kent was nominated for Best Film Editing and Waldon O. Watson for Best Sound. It received a nomination for the 1965 Golden Globe Best Motion Picture - Musical/Comedy award.

When Stone accepted his Oscar, he said "Thank you to Cary Grant who keeps winning these things for other people.”

== Rights and home media ==
The film was originally released by Universal Pictures, with the production itself handled by Granox Productions (who are listed as the copyright holders in the credits). Republic Pictures later acquired the rights to Father Goose and certain other Cary Grant films, including Penny Serenade, Indiscreet, Operation Petticoat, The Grass is Greener and That Touch of Mink. Through Republic, the film's rights transferred to Paramount Pictures, as they acquired ownership of the Republic library in the 1990s.

Paramount licensed the film to Olive Films for a Blu-ray release on May 28, 2013.

== See also ==
- List of American films of 1964
