= Frank Tarloff =

American screenwriter (1916–1999)

- Born: February 4, 1916; Brooklyn, New York, U.S.
- Died: June 25, 1999 (aged 83); Beverly Hills, California, U.S.
- Occupation: Screenwriter
- Spouse: Lee Barrie (m. 1942–1999)
- Children: 2

Frank Tarloff (February 4, 1916 – June 25, 1999) was a blacklisted American screenwriter who won an Academy Award for Best Original Screenplay for Father Goose.

A child of Polish immigrant parents, Tarloff grew up in Brooklyn, New York, where he attended Abraham Lincoln High School and Brooklyn College. He began writing for stage and radio in the 1940s, and his first major film credit was Behave Yourself!. He was called to testify before the House Un-American Activities Committee in 1953, was categorized as a hostile witness, and was blacklisted. He spent the next 12 years living with family in England and writing under pseudonyms such as "David Adler" for shows such as I Married Joan, The Real McCoys, The Dick Van Dyke Show, and Andy Griffith Show.

He received the Academy Award for Father Goose together with S. H. Barnett and Peter Stone and was also nominated for the Writers Guild of America Award for best comedy writing. He received a WGA Award nomination for best comedy writing for A Guide for the Married Man, which he wrote on his own. He is also known for co-writing The Secret War of Harry Frigg.

He returned to television at the end of his career, writing for The Jeffersons.
