= Mirage (1965 film) =

1965 American thriller film directed by Edward Dmytryk

- Theatrical release poster
- Directed by: Edward Dmytryk
- Screenplay by: Peter Stone
- Based on: Fallen Angel; 1952 novel by Howard Fast (as Walter Ericson; uncredited)
- Produced by: Harry Keller
- Starring: Gregory Peck; Diane Baker; Walter Matthau
- Cinematography: Joseph MacDonald
- Edited by: Ted J. Kent
- Music by: Quincy Jones
- Color process: Black and white
- Production company: Universal Pictures
- Distributed by: Universal Pictures
- Release dates: May 26, 1965 (New York City); July 7, 1965 (United States)
- Running time: 109 minutes
- Country: United States
- Language: English
- Box office: $3,270,000

Mirage is a 1965 American neo noir thriller film starring Gregory Peck and Diane Baker, and released by Universal Pictures. Directed by Edward Dmytryk from a screenplay by Peter Stone, it is based on the 1952 novel Fallen Angel, written by Howard Fast under the pseudonym Walter Ericson; the novel is not credited by title onscreen. Walter Matthau, George Kennedy, Leif Erickson and Kevin McCarthy appear in support.

== Plot ==
During a power outage in the Unidyne building, a New York City skyscraper, David Stillwell leaves his colleague Josephson on the 27th floor and begins his descent down the stairs, aided by a penlight. He encounters an attractive young woman who wants help navigating the darkness. Recognizing his voice, she welcomes him back and wonders why the major shut off the power. Stillwell protests that he has not been away, does not know a major, and has never seen her before. They are about to exit to the street when he introduces himself, confirming she was right. Confused and angry, she runs down the basement stairs. He calls after her and looks down to the sub-basement, but she has disappeared.

Outside, Stillwell sees a crowd gathered around the body of peace activist Charles Calvin, who fell from the window of his 27th-floor office. When the lights come on, Stillwell looks for the woman inside and finds there is no sub-basement. A menacing man, Willard, is working in the basement and orders Stillwell to leave.

Threatened at his apartment by the major's henchman Lester, Stillwell does not understand what he wants. Reporting the incident at the police station, Stillwell becomes distressed by basic personal questions and storms out. Realizing there are gaps in his memory, he consults a psychiatrist, Dr. Broden, who is dismissive of his claim of amnesia.

Stillwell hires private detective Ted Caselle, who believes him only after spotting Willard following them. At the Unidyne building, they discover that Stillwell has no office, and while checking the basement, they are shot at by Willard but escape.

The woman from the stairwell, Shela, re-appears and tells a baffled Stillwell that the major wants something from him. According to Shela, she and Stillwell once had a relationship, and they spend the night together. In the morning she is gone and two henchmen try to take Stillwell, but he escapes after using Lester as a shield against Willard's gunfire. Caselle is murdered and Stillwell, after a chase through Central Park, is saved when a car runs over the henchman Bo.

Stillwell has flashbacks and believes his amnesia is just two days old. Dr. Broden, now more sympathetic, suggests that false memories have displaced recent traumatic ones. Stillwell is a physiochemist who worked for Unidyne until Charles Calvin convinced him to conduct research at a California laboratory. After discovering a way to neutralize nuclear radiation, he returned to New York for a meeting with Calvin at the Unidyne building and learned of the illegal connection between the peace advocate's foundation and Unidyne's president, former army major Crawford Gilcuddy, who would use Stillwell's discovery for warfare. The major had the power shut off in an attempt to stop Stillwell from leaving the building. To prevent any misuse of his discovery, Stillwell burned the formula, at which Calvin made a desperate lunge and tripped out of the window to his death. The trauma of witnessing this triggered Stillwell's amnesia.

In a confrontation that includes Josephson, Willard and Shela, the major tries to force Stillwell to recreate the formula. Shela shoots Willard as he holds a gun to Stillwell's head. Turning against the major, Josephson calls the police. Stillwell and Shela embrace.

== Cast ==
- Gregory Peck as David Stillwell
- Diane Baker as Shela
- Walter Matthau as Ted Caselle
- Kevin McCarthy as Josephson
- Jack Weston as Lester
- Leif Erickson as Major Crawford
- Walter Abel as Charles Calvin
- George Kennedy as Willard
- Robert H. Harris as Dr. Broden
- Anne Seymour as Frances
- House B. Jameson as Bo
- Hari Rhodes as Lt. Franken
- Syl Lamont as Benny
- Eileen Baral as Irene
- Neil Fitzgerald as Joe Turtle
- Franklin Cover as group leader

== Production ==
The screenplay was written by Peter Stone as a follow-up to the hugely successful Charade. Matthau and Kennedy were holdovers from the cast of Charade.

Filming took place at a number of locations in the New York Financial District. The fictitious Unidyne company was headquartered at 2 Broadway. Another key location in the film is the walk with Peck and Baker through Battery Park to City Pier A.

The movie was filmed between October 24 and December 24, 1964, on Eastman Kodak black and white film 4-X 5224, and released in the USA on May 26, 1965.

== Critical reception ==
The New York Times wrote, "In brisk, colloquial, occasionally humorous style, this exercise in mayhem, murder, mental instability and moralizing about the scientist's place in an atomic world, evolves as an interesting, fairly taut, if not especially credible, chase-mystery."

Variety wrote, "There are moments of stiff action and suspense but plot is as confusing as it is overly-contrived."

In 2012, Time Out called it "one of the better thrillers of the '60s", concluding, "The harsh b/w photography, the various levels of reality, and the use of urban landscape, all contribute to the feeling of unease, building up an atmosphere that is perhaps better than the mechanics of the plot deserve."

== Musical score and soundtrack ==
Mirage

Soundtrack album by Quincy Jones
- Released: 1965
- Recorded: 1965
- Genre: Film score
- Length: 34:05
- Label: Mercury; MG 21025/SR 61025

Quincy Jones chronology
Quincy Plays for Pussycats (1965)	Mirage (1965)	The Slender Thread (1966)

Professional ratings
Review scores
Source	Rating
Allmusic	4/5 stars

The film score is composed, arranged and conducted by Quincy Jones, using an uncredited orchestra. A soundtrack album was released on Mercury Records in 1965.

=== Track listing ===
All compositions by Quincy Jones.

1. "Mirage (Vocal Version)" (Lyrics by Robert Russell) - 2:18
2. "Boobie Baby" − 3:20
3. "Shoot to Kill" − 2:28
4. "Dead Duck" − 3:12
5. "Purple Rose" − 3:06
6. "Main Title" − 2:50
7. "Mirage (Instrumental Version)" − 3:34
8. "Turtle's Last Lap" − 3:34
9. "A Shot in the Park" − 4:03
10. "Kinda Scary" − 4:33
11. "End Title" − 2:51

== See also ==
- List of American films of 1965
