= Who's Who in the Theatre =

British reference work (book series)

15th edition, 1972

Who's Who in the Theatre is a British reference work, first published in 1912 with sixteen new editions from then until its last issue in 1981.

The book was a successor to The Green Room Book, of which four editions were published between 1906 and 1909. Both works presented brief biographies of well-known members of the theatrical profession, listing all the productions they had appeared in, written, produced or been associated with. Who's Who in the Theatre aimed from the outset to cover Broadway theatre as well as that of the West End and, to a lesser extent, the British provinces.

The editor from 1912 to 1952 was John Parker, a successful businessman, who in addition to his commercial activities was a well-known theatre critic. He was succeeded for a single edition by his son, and then from 1961 to 1968 by Freda Gaye, a former actress and first curator of the British Theatre Museum, and finally by Ian Herbert who was in charge of the last three editions.

As well as the theatrical biographies, the contents varied from edition to edition, but generally included details of major West End productions since the previous edition, lists of long-running productions in London and New York, plans and details of London theatres, and for many years family trees of leading theatrical dynasties.

== Background ==
John Parker, editor 1912 to 1952

The forerunner of Who's Who in the Theatre was The Green Room Book, or Who's Who on the Stage, first published in 1906. That book, published by Sealey Clark of London, was described by its publisher some months before publication as:

A handsome volume of about 400 pages, containing detailed biographies (compiled from direct personal sources) of about 2,500 leading members of the Dramatic, Musical and Variety Professions, including Managers, Agents, Proprietors and Musical Directors.

The book was published simultaneously in London and (by Frederick Warne) in New York. The first edition, which in fact ran to 480 pages, was edited by Brampton Hunt. As with the general biographical dictionary of eminent contemporaries Who's Who, the book relied on information supplied by its subjects on a standard form issued by the editor to anyone he considered eligible for inclusion. The first edition was described by The Tatler as "the completest Who's Who of the playhouse ever published in England".

A new edition, expanded and amended, was issued each year until 1909. From 1908 Hunt was succeeded as editor by John Parker (28 July 1875 – 18 November 1952). Born in London, Parker had a successful career as a shipping agent, which he pursued in tandem with assiduous theatre-going – it was said of him that for more than fifty years he attended practically every London first night – and reviewing. He began to contribute to The Illustrated London News at the age of 17 and subsequently joined the staff of The Era. He was London correspondent for two New York newspapers from 1903 to 1920. He was an early member of The Critics' Circle and became its secretary in 1924 and its president in 1937.

== 1912 to 1916: early editions ==
After the publication of the fourth edition of The Green Room Book, Sealey Clark went out of business. In 1912 the publishing firm Pitman brought out the first edition of a successor volume, Who's Who in the Theatre, edited by Parker. The book was published in the US by Small Maynard of Boston. It contained 563 octavo pages of biographies of people connected with the English-speaking theatre and a separate 62-page "Continental" section. It also featured a short reference section listing 1911's more important openings of new plays in London, New York, Paris and Berlin, and sections giving family trees of noted theatrical dynasties, and working dimensions backstage and seating plans for West End theatres.

The second edition, published in 1914, had grown by two hundred pages, a hundred of them devoted to a list of "Notable Productions and Important Revivals on the London Stage", from the 16th century to the present day, a feature that remained and grew until the 14th edition. Two new sections were added to the third edition, in 1916: a listing of "London Long Runs", and an 84-page section "Who's Who In Variety", consisting of biographies and obituaries of variety performers and a list of London variety theatres.

== 1920s: fourth and fifth editions ==
Typical entry from 1922 edition

Six years elapsed before the fourth edition (1922), in which more than 650 new biographies were added, but, as Parker noted in his preface, "the old school of Actor-Managers has practically disappeared [with the deaths of] Tree, Wyndham, Alexander, Hare, Kendal, H. B. Irving and Edward Compton." The variety section was dropped, as were most of its entries. Playbills were reproduced for the first time, in a short section giving the casts of important London and provincial productions.

The fifth edition was published in 1925. The London playbill listings were expanded; the Continental section was dropped, and most of its entries disappeared, although a few, such as those for Sergei Diaghilev and Sacha Guitry, were retained in the main body of the book. Parker commented in his preface that although he strove for accuracy, dates of birth for "certain performers of the older school" were sometimes elusive. The reviewer in The Sphere noted the fact, but observed that if players did not give their ages "Why should they, poor dears?" He recommended Who's Who in the Theatre as providing far more fun than the general Who's Who.

== 1930s: sixth to ninth editions ==
The sixth edition appeared in 1930, later than intended, because some of Parker's notes were stolen in a burglary, and he was obliged to rewrite much of his manuscript. For the first time he cut entries for inactive performers, referring the reader to the previous edition for full details, but he added 500 new biographies. The Illustrated Sporting and Dramatic News said of the new 1,800-page edition, "Like Falstaff, it grows in bulk with age, but … it is a case of the bigger the better".

In the fourth edition Parker had explicitly excluded the cinema from the book, apart from occasional mention of film actors who had also made a stage career, but in the seventh edition (1933) he started to pay attention to activities in "Talking Pictures", although he delegated this to his son, John Parker, Jr. This addition was welcomed by the theatrical paper The Era, which said, "No other volume devoted to the contemporary theatre contains so immense a number of facts and dates … the most comprehensive collection of theatrical data in existence".

The 1936 eighth edition was the first to exceed two thousand pages, despite the omission of 300 biographies from the previous edition whose subjects had made no stage appearances in the interim. In addition to the main features and updates it offered a brief article on "Actresses and the Peerage", showing that from 1735 to 1935 36 actresses married peers, comprising six dukes, three marquesses, fifteen earls, one viscount and eleven barons.

The ninth edition was published at the end of 1939, and in the preface Parker recorded that all London theatres had been closed by government order on the outbreak of the Second World War – the first time such an order had been made since the Great Plague in 1665. There were more than 400 new biographies in this edition, and the cumulative obituary section ran to more than 4,000 names. Alongside the main features, a brief article dealt with "University Rivalry", showing that of the performers featured in the edition 62 had been at Oxford and 51 at Cambridge.

== 1950s and 1960s: tenth to fourteenth editions ==
Cover of 13th edition, strikingly different from that of the 15th, above

The eleventh edition, published in 1952, was the last to be edited by Parker, who died that year. In addition to the usual features it included for the first time a list of theatrical biographies, recollections and reminiscences. Inflation had taken the price of the book from 30 shillings (£1.50) for the ninth edition to £4 for the tenth.

John Parker Jr edited the twelfth edition, published in 1957. The price had risen to five guineas (£5.25) and the page count was reduced to 1,722. The new editor omitted the genealogical tables of theatrical dynasties, but continued his father's tradition of including a short diverting article along with the major features, in this case a list of stars who pursued other occupations before going on the stage, including Tyrone Power (a soda-fountain dispenser) and Maurice Chevalier (an electrician).

Freda Gaye (27 December 1907 – 19 October 1986) took over as editor for the thirteenth and fourteenth editions. She was a former actress, who had been a member of Sybil Thorndike and Lewis Casson's company, and became the first curator of the British Theatre Museum. The thirteenth edition (1961) included several changes. For the first time since the earliest editions some photographs were included. Biographies of ballet performers were dropped because "the popularity of ballet having increased so rapidly during recent years", a separate Who's Who in Ballet was planned. (It did not materialise.) This was the first edition to adopt the increasingly common practice for the terms "producer" and "director", using the first to signify the manager or promoter of a production and the latter for the person who is in charge of staging it. The binding of new editions remained severely functional, but varied and colourful dust-jackets were introduced, making one edition easily distinguishable from another.

The fourteenth edition, a belated celebration of the fiftieth anniversary of the first edition, was published in 1967. It included a photographic section covering the five decades since 1912, starting with Tree as Cardinal Wolsey in Henry VIII and ending with the Chichester Festival production of Uncle Vanya, by way of Noël Coward and Gertrude Lawrence in Private Lives, Laurence Olivier and John Gielgud as Romeo and Mercutio, and the casts of The Mousetrap, Waiting for Godot, My Fair Lady and another 27 productions. Another new feature was an index to all the playbills in previous editions. Seating plans were dropped from this edition.

== 1970s and 1980s: fifteenth to seventeenth editions ==
Ian Herbert was editor for the fifteenth to seventeenth editions, in 1972, 1977 and 1981. He had joined Pitmans from Cambridge and took on Who's Who in the Theatre when Gaye was unable to continue. There was no budget to employ outside researchers and Herbert recruited his wife and, in the words of The Guardian, "convert[ed] the front-room of their home into an office awash with programmes, cast-lists, and career biographies". In the fifteenth edition, Broadway and Off-Broadway productions were included in the playbill section, and the list of "Notable Productions and Revivals" and the cumulative obituary – more than 300 pages between them – were dropped. Biographies of people from continental Europe were largely omitted "to retain the book's concentration on English-speaking theatre". The 1977 edition was reset in a modern and more readable typeface that made it possible to reduce the length of the book substantially.

The seventeenth and last edition was published in two volumes. Between its completion and publication, the Gale Research company of Detroit, which had taken over as publisher, closed its London office, dispensed with Herbert and attempted to edit the book from its American headquarters. The price soared between the 1977 and 1981 editions, the former selling for £15 and the latter for £129.

In 1978, Gale published Who Was Who in the Theatre, a four-volume selection of the deceased or inactive individuals from the first fifteen editions of Who's Who in the Theatre. It was edited anonymously from Gale's Detroit office and comprised 4,100 biographies. In 1982 the company launched a series entitled Contemporary Theatre, Film and Television, providing biographical articles on American and some British performers, and other people associated with stage and screen.

== Sources ==
- Gaye, Freda, ed. (1967). Who's Who in the Theatre (Fourteenth ed.). London: Sir Isaac Pitman and Sons. OCLC 5997224.
- Herbert, Ian, ed. (1977). Who's Who in the Theatre (Sixteenth ed.). London and Detroit: Pitman Publishing and Gale Research. ISBN 978-0-273-00163-8.
- O'Donnell, Monica (1982). Contemporary Theatre, Film and Television. Detroit: Gale. ISBN 978-1-4144-4471-0.
- Parker, John, ed. (1922). Who's Who in the Theatre (Fourth ed.). London: Sir Isaac Pitman and Sons. OCLC 473894893.
- Parker, John, ed. (1925). Who's Who in the Theatre (Fifth ed.). London: Sir Isaac Pitman and Sons. OCLC 10013159.
- Rose, Martial (2003). Forever Juliet: The Life and Letters of Gwen Ffrangcon-Davies, 1891–1992. Dereham: Larks Press. ISBN 978-1-904006-12-1.
- Who Was Who in the Theatre. Detroit: Gale. 1978. OCLC 297602022.
