= 1958 Academy Awards =

1958 Academy Awards may refer to:

- 30th Academy Awards, the Academy Awards ceremony that took place in 1958
- 31st Academy Awards, the 1959 ceremony honoring the best in film for 1958
