= Ralph Jester =

American costume designer (1901–1991)

- Born: July 10, 1901; Tyler, Texas, USA
- Died: September 25, 1991 (aged 90); Los Angeles, California, USA
- Occupation: Costume Designer
- Years active: 1934-1959
- Spouse: Elizabeth Hawes (m. 1930; div. 1935)

Ralph Jester (July 10, 1901 – September 25, 1991) was an American costume designer, sculptor, and artist.

Born in Tyler, Texas, he graduated in 1919 from the Terrill School, the forerunner to St. Mark's School of Texas. He was educated at Yale, where he was an editor of the campus humor magazine The Yale Record.

After graduating from Yale and studying at the American Academy in Fontainebleau, France, Jester moved to Hollywood. By 1931, he was working as an art director and costume designer for Cecil B. DeMille and Paramount Pictures. For much of his career, his closest collaborator was Edith Head.

For DeMille's epic Cleopatra (1934), Jester designed Claudette Colbert’s marble throne, as well as the busts of Colbert and her co star, Warren William.

He is perhaps best known professionally as one of the costume designers of The Ten Commandments (1956). He also worked on such films as Omar Khayyam (1957) and The Buccaneer (1958).

Earlier, in 1938, Frank Lloyd Wright had designed a circular home for Jester in Santa Clara, California. Never built but considered a masterpiece of design, the house was Wright's first foray into using the circle in his buildings. Wright's Guggenheim Museum would not be built for another 20 years. Jester later employed Lloyd Wright, Jr. to design a modernist house for him in Rancho Palos Verdes, California.

== Oscar Nominations ==
Both were for Best Costumes.

- 29th Academy Awards (color costumes category): Nominated for The Ten Commandments. Nomination shared with Arnold Friberg, Edith Head, Dorothy Jeakins and John Jensen. Lost to The King and I.
- 31st Academy Awards: Nominated for The Buccaneer. Nomination shared with Edith Head and John Jensen. Lost to Gigi.
