= John Jensen (costume designer) =

American costume designer

- Occupation: Costume Designer
- Years active: 1956-1972

John Jensen was an American costume designer who was nominated for two Academy Awards.

== Oscar Nominations ==
Both were for Best Costumes.

- 29th Academy Awards (color costumes category): Nominated for The Ten Commandments. Nomination shared with Arnold Friberg, Edith Head, Dorothy Jeakins and Ralph Jester. Lost to The King and I.
- 31st Academy Awards: Nominated for The Buccaneer. Nomination shared with Edith Head and Ralph Jester. Lost to Gigi.

== Filmography ==
- The Ten Commandments (1956)
- The Buccaneer (1958)
- The Bellboy (1960)
- Where It's At (1969)
- The Cowboys (1972)
