= 1959 Academy Awards =

1959 Academy Awards may refer to:

- 31st Academy Awards, the Academy Awards ceremony that took place in 1959
- 32nd Academy Awards, the 1960 ceremony honoring the best in film for 1959
