= Journey into Spring =

1956 British short documentary film

- Directed by: Ralph Keene
- Written by: Laurie Lee
- Produced by: Edgar Anstey; Ian Ferguson
- Narrated by: Stephen Murray
- Cinematography: Patrick Carey
- Edited by: Ralph Sheldon
- Music by: Edward Williams
- Production company: British Transport Films
- Distributed by: New Realm Pictures
- Release date: 1958
- Running time: 28 minutes
- Country: United Kingdom
- Language: English

Journey into Spring is a 1958 British short documentary film directed by Ralph Keene, and made by British Transport Films. It won the 1958 BAFTA Award for Best Documentary, and was nominated for two Academy Awards: one for Best Documentary Short, the other for Best Live Action Short.

The film, partly a tribute to Gilbert White, author of The Natural History of Selborne, features a commentary by the poet Laurie Lee, and camerawork by the wildlife cinematographer Patrick Carey.

== Reception ==
The Monthly Film Bulletin wrote: "Selborne is shown at the beginning of spring, and the film explores the hedgerows, ponds and nests, showing the proliferating life there. Laurie Lee's commentary is preciously postic, the colour (by Technicolor) is good; but the note of wistful lyricism is spun out for rather too long."

Kine Weekly wrote: "Delightful interest featurette, brilliantly photographed in Technicolor, dealing with animal, bird and plant life in Selborne, Hampshire, made famous by Gilbert White, the great 18th-century naturalist. Its close-ups and long shots are beautifully blended, and the result is screen poetry, understandable to all."

Lindsay Anderson wrote in the New Statesman: "Journey Into Spring is undynamic, ordinary in conception, and without the slightest touch of personal feeling; it is ornamented by one of those terrible 'poetic' commentaries which tries to supplant the images on the screen with 'literary' fancies of its own (Mr Laurie Lee is responsible for this); in any real sense it is wholly unlyrical. All the same, by conventional standards of technique, it is a job well done: everything joins together nicely, the soundtrack is well laid [and] the photography is excellent. But it is still legitimate to ask – is this enough? These vernal moles, stained glass windows and shiny airliners – is this what the finest flower of the British Cinema (and I think it is legitimate to refer to the documentary movement in such terms) has been reduced to?"

BFI Screenonline wrote: "This is one of BTF's loveliest films, and a valuable record of the teeming variety that lurks in Britain's ponds and hedgerows."

== Home media ==
The film is included in the BFI British Transport Films Collection DVD – Volume 5: Off The Beaten Track (2007).
