= 31st Academy Awards =

- Official poster
- Date: April 6, 1959
- Site: Pantages Theatre, Hollywood, California, USA
- Hosted by: Jerry Lewis, Mort Sahl, Tony Randall, Bob Hope, David Niven, and Laurence Olivier
- Produced by: Jerry Wald
- Directed by: Alan Handley

Highlights
- Best Picture: Gigi
- Most awards: Gigi (9)
- Most nominations: The Defiant Ones and Gigi (9)

TV in the United States
- Network: NBC

The 31st Academy Awards ceremony was held on April 6, 1959, to honor the best films of 1958. The night was dominated by Gigi, which won nine Oscars, breaking the previous record of eight, first set by Gone with the Wind in 1939. (Note: Later tied by From Here to Eternity (1953) and On the Waterfront (1954).)

Gigi set a new record for biggest Oscars sweep, winning all nine of its nominations, which would be broken in 1960, when Ben-Hur won eleven of its twelve nominations. Finally, Gigi was the last film until The Last Emperor to win Best Picture without any acting nominations.

The ceremony was hosted by an ensemble of actors: Jerry Lewis, Mort Sahl, Tony Randall, Bob Hope, David Niven, and Laurence Olivier.

The show's producer, Jerry Wald, started cutting numbers from the show to make sure it ran on time, but cut too much material, and the ceremony ended 20 minutes early, leaving Jerry Lewis to attempt to fill in the time, which he did with a performance of "There's No Business Like Show Business" from all 90 of the participating stars; Lewis did impromptu conducting of the number, but some of the stars began to talk among themselves, while others left or bumped into each other in confusion. Eventually, NBC cut to a re-run of a sports show.

== Awards ==
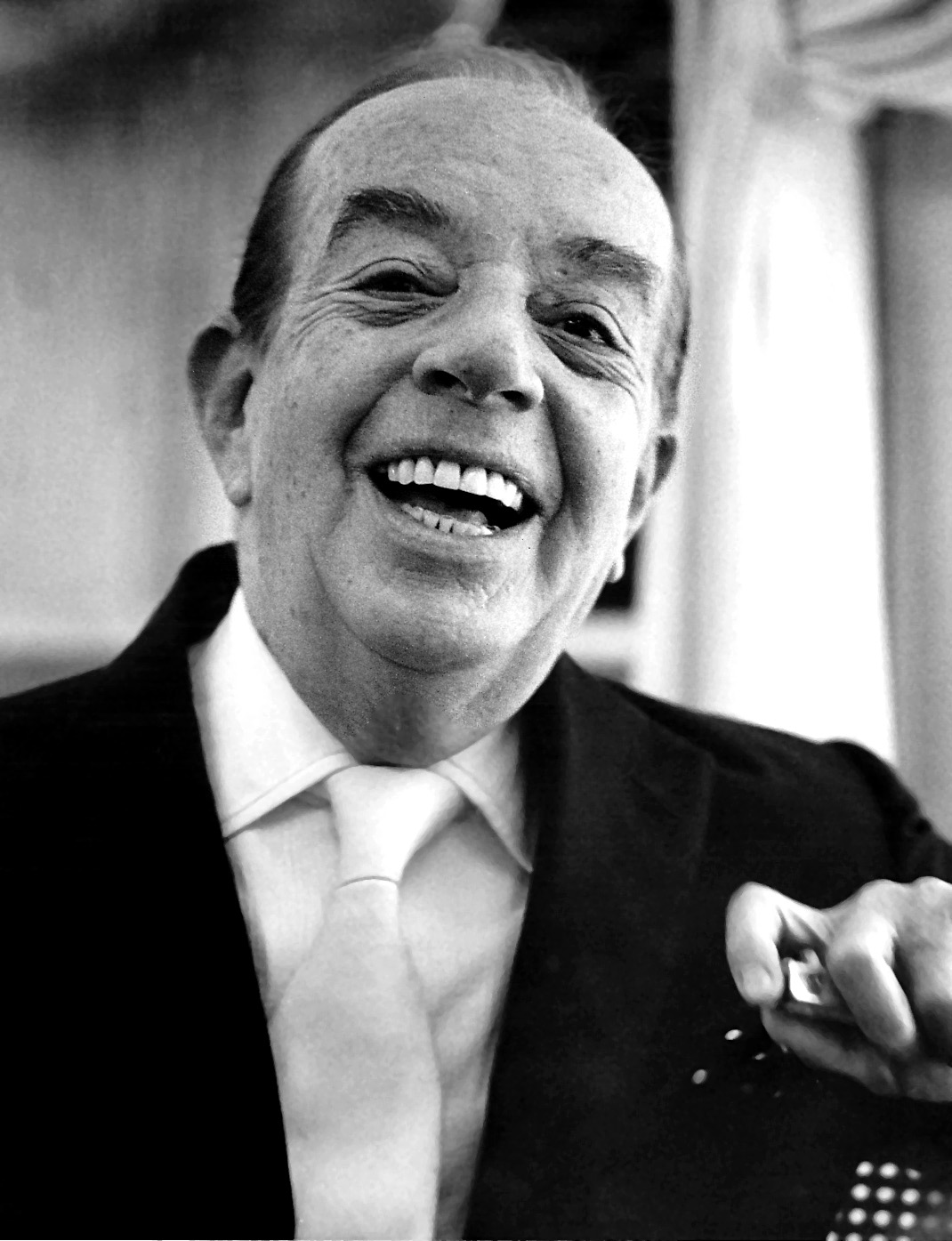
Vincente Minnelli; Best Director winner

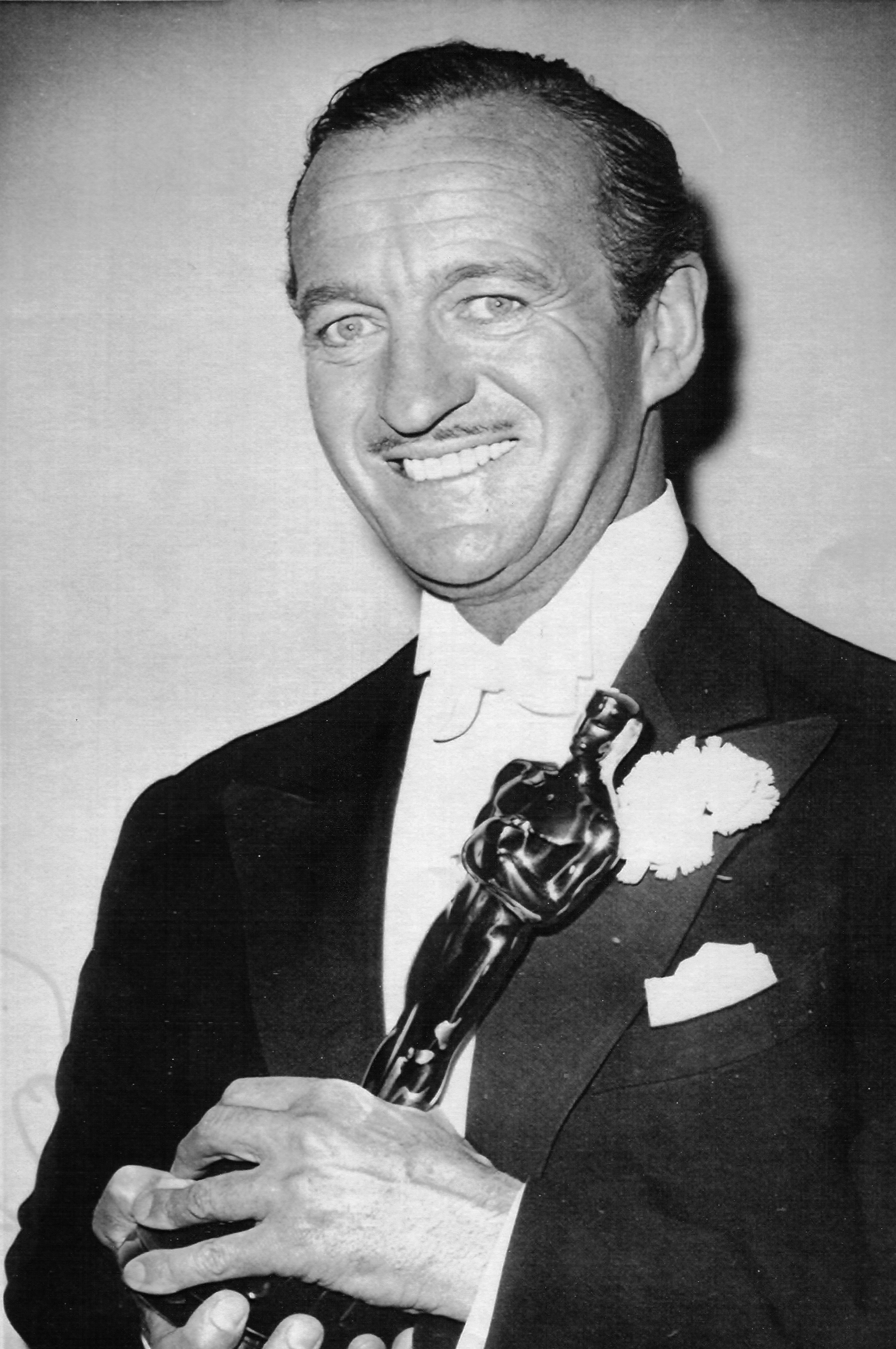
David Niven; Best Actor winner

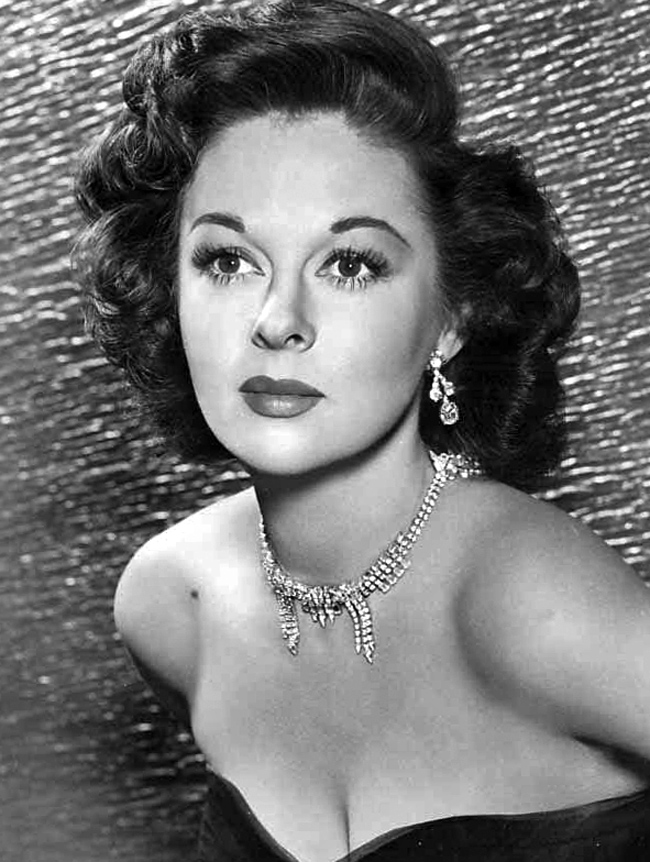
Susan Hayward; Best Actress winner

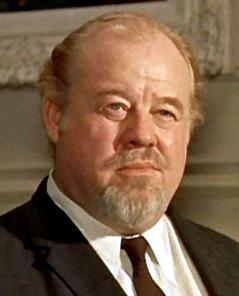
Burl Ives; Best Supporting Actor winner

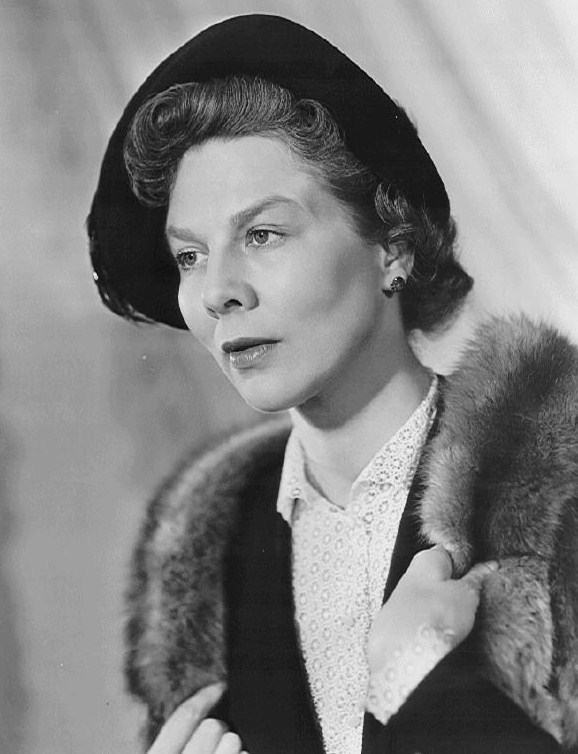
Wendy Hiller; Best Supporting Actress winner

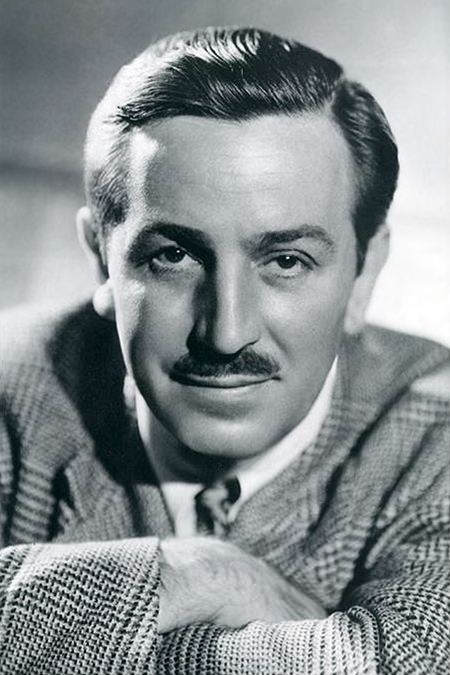
Walt Disney; Best Live Action Short Film winner

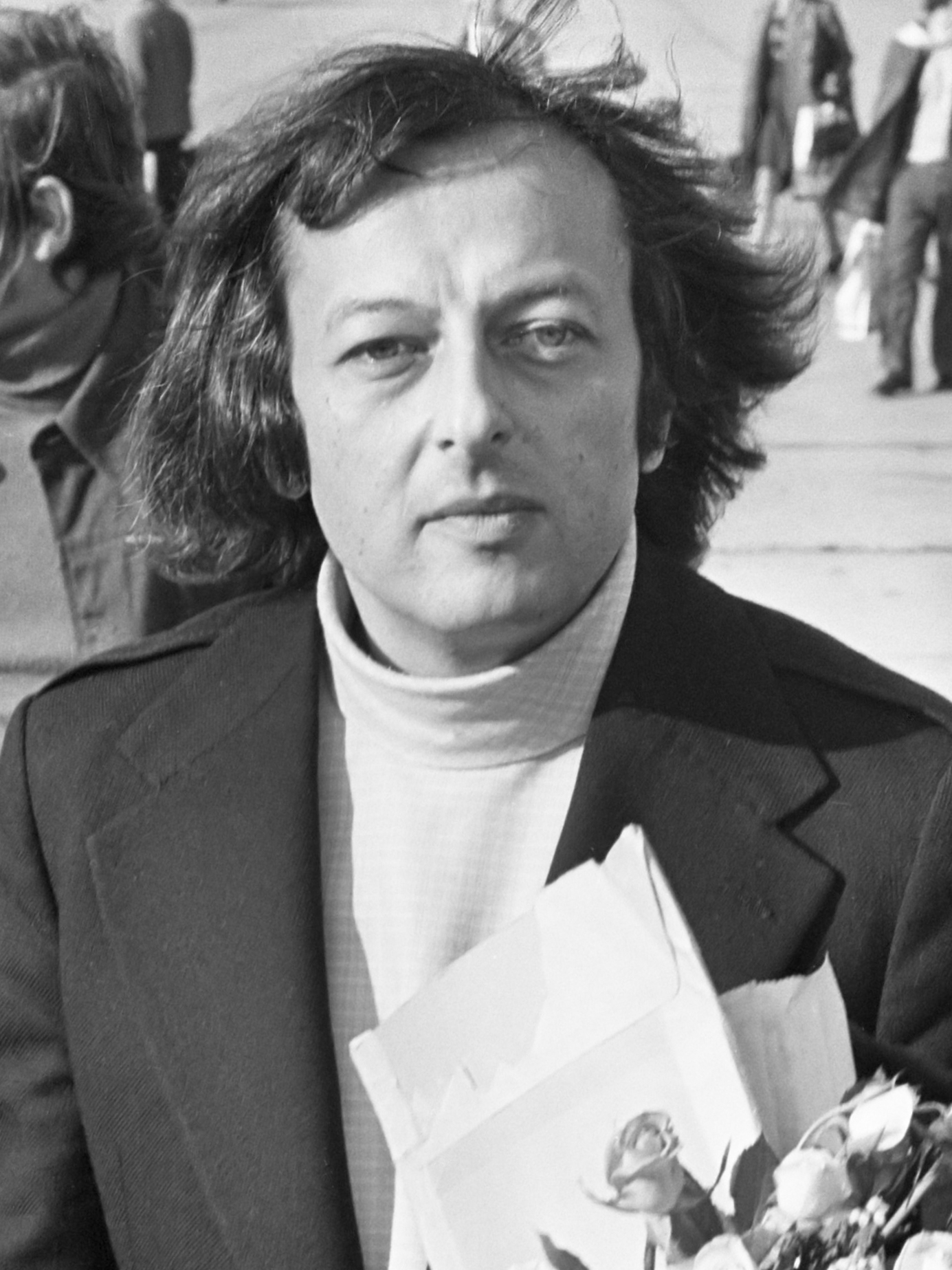
André Previn; Best Scoring of a Musical Picture winner

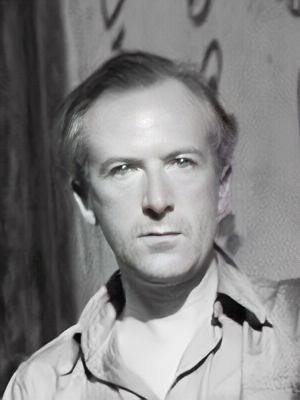
Cecil Beaton; Best Costume Design winner

Nominations announced on February 23, 1959. Winners are listed first and highlighted in boldface.

**Best Motion Picture**: **Gigi – Arthur Freed, producer**; Auntie Mame – Jack L. Warner, producer; Cat on a Hot Tin Roof – Lawrence Weingarten, producer; The Defiant Ones – Stanley Kramer, producer; Separate Tables – Harold Hecht, producer	**Best Directing**: **Vincente Minnelli – Gigi**; Richard Brooks – Cat on a Hot Tin Roof; Stanley Kramer – The Defiant Ones; Robert Wise – I Want to Live!; Mark Robson – The Inn of the Sixth Happiness
**Best Actor**: **David Niven – Separate Tables as Major David Angus Pollock**; Tony Curtis – The Defiant Ones as John "Joker" Jackson; Paul Newman – Cat on a Hot Tin Roof as Brick Pollitt; Sidney Poitier – The Defiant Ones as Noah Cullen; Spencer Tracy – The Old Man and the Sea as The Old Man	**Best Actress**: **Susan Hayward – I Want to Live! as Barbara Graham**; Deborah Kerr – Separate Tables as Sibyl Railton-Bell; Shirley MacLaine – Some Came Running as Ginny Moorehead; Rosalind Russell – Auntie Mame as Mame Dennis; Elizabeth Taylor – Cat on a Hot Tin Roof as Margaret "Maggie the Cat" Pollitt
**Best Actor in a Supporting Role**: **Burl Ives – The Big Country as Rufus Hannassey**; Theodore Bikel – The Defiant Ones as Sheriff Max Muller; Lee J. Cobb – The Brothers Karamazov as Fyodor Karamazov; Arthur Kennedy – Some Came Running as Frank Hirsh; Gig Young – Teacher's Pet as Dr. Hugo Pine	**Best Actress in a Supporting Role**: **Wendy Hiller – Separate Tables as Pat Cooper**; Peggy Cass – Auntie Mame as Agnes Gooch; Martha Hyer – Some Came Running as Gwen French; Maureen Stapleton – Lonelyhearts as Fay Doyle; Cara Williams – The Defiant Ones as Billy's mother
**Best Writing (Story and Screenplay -- Written Directly for the Screen)**: **The Defiant Ones – Nedrick Young and Harold Jacob Smith**; The Goddess – Paddy Chayefsky; Houseboat – Melville Shavelson and Jack Rose; The Sheepman – William Bowers and James Edward Grant; Teacher's Pet – Fay Kanin and Michael Kanin	**Best Writing (Screenplay -- Based on Material from Another Medium)**: **Gigi – Alan Jay Lerner from the novella by Colette**; Cat on a Hot Tin Roof – Richard Brooks and James Poe from Cat on a Hot Tin Roof by Tennessee Williams; The Horse's Mouth – Alec Guinness from The Horse's Mouth by Joyce Cary; I Want to Live! – Don Mankiewicz and Nelson Gidding from writings by Ed Montgomery and Barbara Graham; Separate Tables – John Gay and Terence Rattigan from Separate Tables by Terence Rattigan
**Best Foreign Language Film**: **My Uncle (France)**; Arms and the Man (West Germany); Big Deal on Madonna Street (Italy); The Road a Year Long (Yugoslavia); La venganza (Spain)	**Best Documentary (Feature)**: **White Wilderness – Ben Sharpsteen**; Antarctic Crossing – James Carr; The Hidden World – Robert Snyder; Psychiatric Nursing – Nathan Zucker
**Best Documentary (Short Subject)**: **Ama Girls – Ben Sharpsteen**; Employees Only – Kenneth G. Brown; Journey into Spring – Ian Ferguson; The Living Stone – Tom Daly; Overture – Thorold Dickinson	**Best Short Subject (Live Action)**: **Grand Canyon – Walt Disney**; Journey into Spring – Ian Ferguson; The Kiss – John Hayes; Snows of Aorangi – New Zealand Screen Board; T Is for Tumbleweed – James A. Lebenthal
**Best Short Subject (Cartoon)**: **Knighty Knight Bugs – John W. Burton**; Paul Bunyan – Walt Disney; Sidney's Family Tree – William M. Weiss	**Best Music (Music Score of a Dramatic or Comedy Picture)**: **The Old Man and the Sea – Dimitri Tiomkin**; The Big Country – Jerome Moross; Separate Tables – David Raksin; White Wilderness – Oliver Wallace; The Young Lions – Hugo Friedhofer
**Best Music (Scoring of a Musical Picture)**: **Gigi – André Previn**; The Bolshoi Ballet – Yuri Faier and G. Rozhdestvensky; Damn Yankees! – Ray Heindorf; Mardi Gras – Lionel Newman; South Pacific – Alfred Newman and Ken Darby	**Best Music (Song)**: **"Gigi" from Gigi – Music by Frederick Loewe; Lyrics by Alan Jay Lerner**; "Almost In Your Arms (Love Song from Houseboat)" from Houseboat – Music and Lyrics by Jay Livingston and Ray Evans; "A Certain Smile" from A Certain Smile – Music by Sammy Fain; Lyrics by Paul Francis Webster; "To Love and Be Loved" from Some Came Running – Music by Jimmy Van Heusen; Lyrics by Sammy Cahn; "A Very Precious Love" from Marjorie Morningstar – Music by Sammy Fain; Lyrics by Paul Francis Webster
**Best Sound**: **South Pacific – Fred Hynes**; I Want to Live! – Gordon E. Sawyer; A Time to Love and a Time to Die – Leslie I. Carey; Vertigo – George Dutton; The Young Lions – Carlton W. Faulkner	**Best Art Direction**: **Gigi – Art Direction: William A. Horning (posthumous award) and E. Preston Ames; Set Decoration: Henry Grace and F. Keogh Gleason**; Auntie Mame – Art Direction: Malcolm Bert; Set Decoration: George James Hopkins; Bell, Book and Candle – Art Direction: Cary Odell; Set Decoration: Louis Diage; A Certain Smile – Art Direction: Lyle R. Wheeler and John DeCuir; Set Decoration: Walter M. Scott and Paul S. Fox; Vertigo – Art Direction: Hal Pereira and Henry Bumstead; Set Decoration: Samuel M. Comer and Frank R. McKelvy
**Best Cinematography (Black-and-White)**: **The Defiant Ones – Sam Leavitt**; Desire Under the Elms – Daniel L. Fapp; I Want to Live! – Lionel Lindon; Separate Tables – Charles Lang; The Young Lions – Joseph MacDonald	**Best Cinematography (Color)**: **Gigi – Joseph Ruttenberg**; Auntie Mame – Harry Stradling Sr.; Cat on a Hot Tin Roof – William Daniels; The Old Man and the Sea – James Wong Howe; South Pacific – Leon Shamroy
**Best Costume Design**: **Gigi – Cecil Beaton**; Bell, Book and Candle – Jean Louis; The Buccaneer – Ralph Jester, Edith Head and John Jensen; A Certain Smile – Charles LeMaire and Mary Wills; Some Came Running – Walter Plunkett	**Best Film Editing**: **Gigi – Adrienne Fazan**; Auntie Mame – William Ziegler; Cowboy – William Lyon and Al Clark; The Defiant Ones – Frederic Knudtson; I Want to Live! – William Hornbeck
**Best Special Effects**: **Tom Thumb – Tom Howard**; Torpedo Run – Visual Effects: A. Arnold Gillespie; Audible Effects: Harold Humbrock

=== Honorary Award ===
- To Maurice Chevalier for his contributions to the world of entertainment for more than half a century.

=== Irving G. Thalberg Memorial Award ===
- Jack L. Warner

== Presenters and performers ==
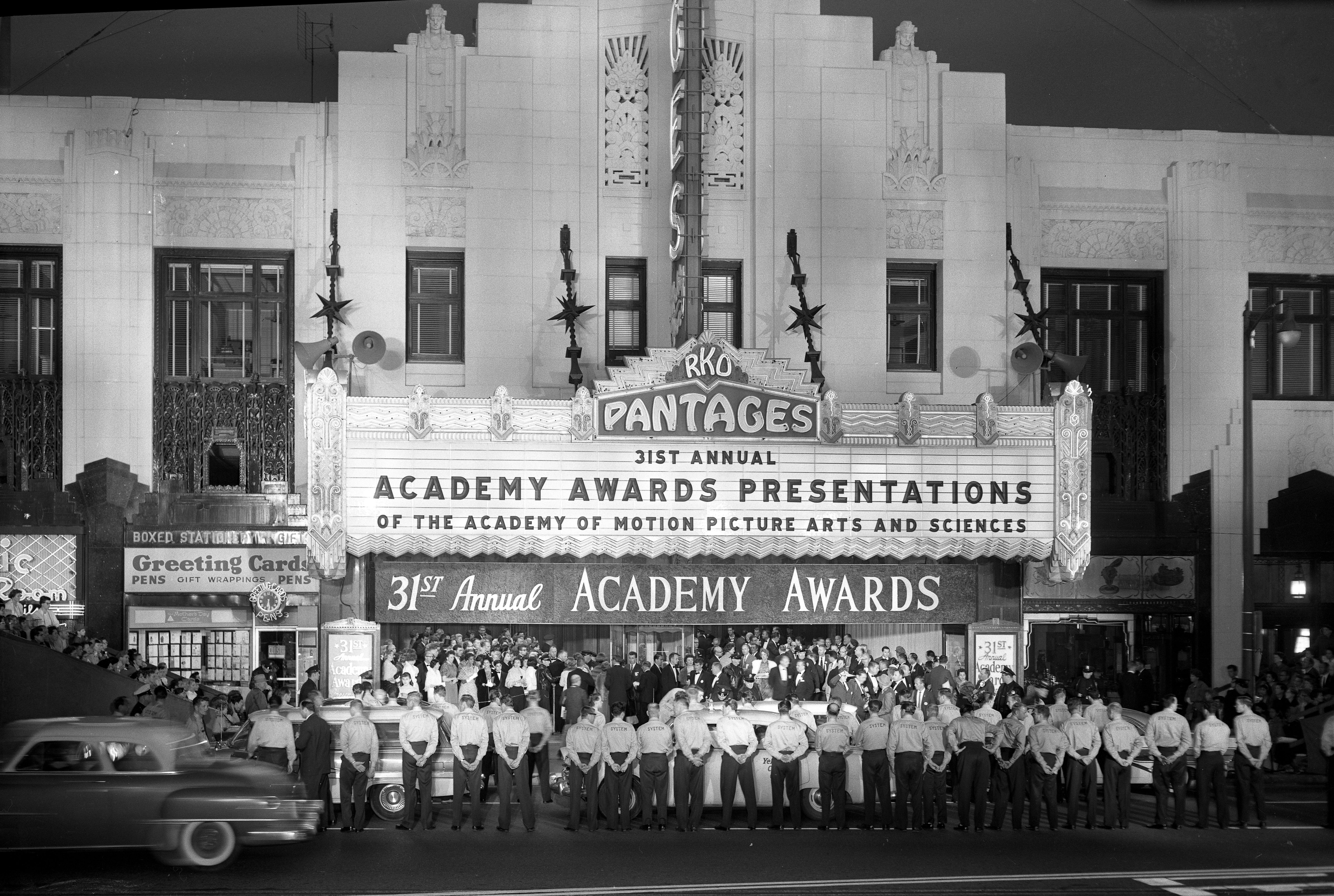
People lining the street under the marquee of the Pantages Theater at the 31st Academy Awards.

=== Presenters ===
- Buddy Adler (Presenter: Irving G. Thalberg Memorial Award)
- Eddie Albert and Vincent Price (Presenters: Art Direction Award)
- June Allyson and Dick Powell (Presenters: Musical Scoring Awards)
- Ingrid Bergman (Presenters: Best Motion Picture)
- Dirk Bogarde, Van Heflin, and Elizabeth Taylor (Presenters: Writing Awards)
- Red Buttons and Shelley Winters (Presenters: Best Supporting Actress)
- James Cagney and Kim Novak (Presenters: Best Actress)
- Cyd Charisse and Robert Stack (Presenters: Best Foreign Language Film)
- Gary Cooper and Millie Perkins (Presenters: Best Director)
- Wendell Corey and Ernie Kovacs (Presenters: Costume Design Award)
- Tony Curtis and Janet Leigh (Presenters: Short Subjects Awards)
- Bette Davis and Anthony Quinn (Presenters: Best Supporting Actor)
- Doris Day and Rock Hudson (Presenters: Cinematography Awards)
- Irene Dunne and John Wayne (Presenters: Best Actor)
- Louis Jourdan and Jean Simmons (Presenters: Best Film Editing)
- Anthony Franciosa and Eva Marie Saint (Presenters: Music Awards)
- Charlton Heston and Jane Wyman (Presenters: Best Sound Recording)
- Sophia Loren and Dean Martin (Presenters: Best Original Song)
- Shirley MacLaine and Peter Ustinov (Presenters: Best Visual Effects)
- Rosalind Russell (Presenter: Honorary Award to Maurice Chevalier)
- Robert Wagner and Natalie Wood (Presenters: Documentary Awards)

=== Performers ===
- Lionel Newman – Conductor the Academy Awards orchestra
- Nick Adams, Anna Maria Alberghetti, James Darren, Dean Jones, Connie Stevens, and Tuesday Weld ("Almost In Your Arms" from Houseboat)
- Joan Collins, Angela Lansbury and Dana Wynter ("It's Great Not to Be Nominated")
- Kirk Douglas and Burt Lancaster ("It's Alright With Us")
- Eddie Fisher ("To Love and Be Loved" from Some Came Running)
- Rhonda Fleming and Howard Keel ("A Very Precious Love" from Marjorie Morningstar)
- Tony Martin ("Gigi" from Gigi)
- John Raitt ("A Certain Smile" from A Certain Smile)

== Multiple nominations and awards ==
Films with multiple nominations
Nominations	Film
9	The Defiant Ones
9	Gigi
7	Separate Tables
6	Auntie Mame
6	Cat on a Hot Tin Roof
6	I Want to Live!
5	Some Came Running
3	A Certain Smile
3	The Old Man and the Sea
3	South Pacific
3	The Young Lions
2	Bell, Book and Candle
2	The Big Country
2	Houseboat
2	Journey into Spring
2	Teacher's Pet
2	Vertigo
2	White Wilderness

Films with multiple awards
Awards	Film
9	Gigi
2	The Defiant Ones
2	Separate Tables

== See also ==
- 1958 in film
- 1st Grammy Awards
- 10th Primetime Emmy Awards
- 11th Primetime Emmy Awards
- 12th British Academy Film Awards
- 13th Tony Awards
- 16th Golden Globe Awards
