= Eric Arthur Wylam =

British animator and artist (1919-1996)

Eric Arthur Wylam (2 April 1919 – 10 September 1996) was a British animator and artist. He worked on documentary film projects for British Transport Films and World Wide Pictures. His most notable film project was his animation work with Paul McCartney on the live-action / animated project, The Bruce McMouse Show. He was a veteran of World War II.

== Early life ==
Wylam was born in Devonport, Devon, England to Arthur Thomas Wylam and Edith Muriel Cooper. In the 1930s, Wylam studied at the Plymouth School of Art, where his studies cut short due to the outbreak of World War II in 1939. Wylam ended his service as a Lance Corporal in 1945.

== Film work ==
Wylam's works include the documentary films, Genetics and Plant Breeding (World Wide Pictures, 1969), Crossing the Channel (British Transport Films, 1972), and Express Link with Europe (British Transport Films, 1972).

== The Bruce McMouse Show ==
The Bruce McMouse Show was initially intended as a blended live-action / animated concert film for the band, Paul McCartney and Wings. Directed by Barry Chattington and animated by Wylam, the film's production began in 1972 and was completed in 1977. Wylam took sketches by McCartney "and created the final McMouse family." By the time the project was completed, McCartney felt the film no longer fit the direction of his band and the film not released. Ultimately, the film was restored in 2018, and made its theatrical release in 2019, nearly 12 years after Wylam's death. The film is now available online.

In 2011, Wylam's daughter sold McCartney's original 1972 sketches of the McMouse project's characters.

== Death ==
Eric Arthur Wylam died on September 10, 1996.
