= Wiard Ihnen =

American art director

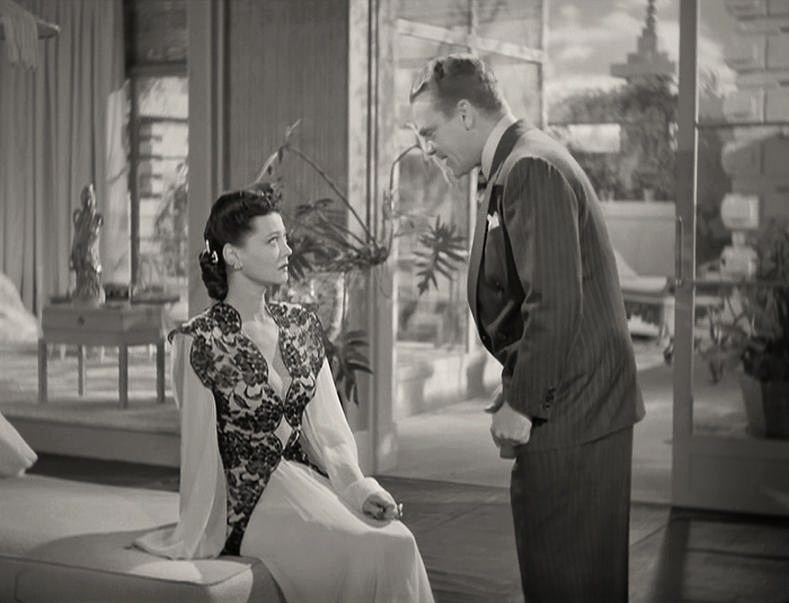
- Born: August 5, 1897; Jersey City, New Jersey, U.S.
- Died: June 22, 1979 (aged 81); Los Angeles, California, U.S.
- Resting place: Forest Lawn Memorial Park (Glendale)
- Education: Columbia University; École des Beaux-Arts de Paris
- Occupation: Art director
- Years active: 1919–1960
- Spouse: Edith Head (m. 1940; died 1979)

Wiard Boppo "Bill" Ihnen (August 5, 1897 – June 22, 1979) was an American art director. He was active from 1919 to 1960 and won Academy Awards for Best Art Direction for Wilson (1944) and Blood on the Sun (1945). He was married to Edith Head.

== Early years ==
Ihnen was born in Jersey City, New Jersey. His age and year of birth are uncertain. While some sources indicate he was born in 1897, his obituary in the Los Angeles Times reported his age as 91, indicating that he was born in approximately 1888.

His father, Henry S. Ihnen, was an architect and painter of German-Frissian origin . Ihnen attended public schools in East Rutherford, New Jersey. He worked for a time as the assistant to a prominent New York architect and studied architecture at Columbia University. He also studied at École des Beaux-Arts de Paris, spent a year at the art centers of Spain and France, and studied color and technique at the University of Mexico.

== Art direction ==
Ihnen first worked in the motion picture business in approximately 1919 at Paramount Studios on Long Island. After several years with Paramount in New York, he become an art director at Paramount's Hollywood studios.

One of his earliest works as an art director was the Josef von Sternberg's 1932 film, Blonde Venus. He drew attention for his design of "fantastically exotic" African nightclub in the film.

Other early art directing credits include the Marx Brothers' Duck Soup (1933) and a pair of Mae West comedies: Go West, Young Man (1936) and Every Day's a Holiday. Ihnen received his first Academy Awards nomination for Best Art Direction on Every Day's a Holiday. He also worked as the associate art director on John Ford's Stagecoach which won the Academy Award for art direction for Alexander Toluboff.

During the 1940s, Ihnen twice won the Academy Award for art direction, for the biographical film Wilson (1944) and for Blood on the Sun (1945), a wartime film about a Japanese plot to take over the world.

Ihnen continued as an art director until 1960. His later works include the film noir works Kiss Tomorrow Goodbye (1950) and I, the Jury (1953), Fritz Lang's Rancho Notorious (1952), the aviation adventure film Top of the World (1955), and the biographical The Gallant Hours (1960).

== Personal life and later years ==
In 1940, Ihnen was married in Las Vegas to Hollywood dress designer Edith Head. Ihnen died from cancer in 1979. He is interred at Forest Lawn Memorial Park in Glendale, California, next to his wife.

== Filmography ==
- The Dance of Life (1929, set design)
- Blonde Venus (1932, art director)
- Madame Butterfly (1932)
- Duck Soup (1933, art director)
- Terror Aboard (1933, art director)
- Good Dame (1934, art director)
- Thirty-Day Princess (1934, art director)
- The Trumpet Blows (1934, art director)
- Becky Sharp (1935)
- Dancing Pirate (1936, art director)
- Go West, Young Man (1936, art director)
- Mind Your Own Business (1936, art director)
- Every Day's a Holiday (1937, art director)
- The Girl from Scotland Yard (1937, art director)
- Love on Toast (1937, art director)
- Midnight Madonna (1937, art director)
- On Such a Night (1937, art director)
- Outcast (1937 art director)
- Doctor Rhythm (1938, art director)
- Hollywood Cavalcade (1939, art director)
- The Return of the Cisco Kid (1939, art director)
- Stagecoach (1939, associate art director)
- The Blue Bird (1940, art director)
- Johnny Apollo (1940, art director)
- Maryland (1940, art director)
- The Return of Frank James (1940, art director)
- Youth Will Be Served (1940, art director)
- Confirm or Deny (1941, art director)
- Hudson's Bay (1941, art director)
- Man Hunt (1941, art director)
- Moon Over Miami (1941, art director)
- Remember the Day (1941, art director)
- Tall, Dark and Handsome (1941, art director)
- Iceland (1942, art director)
- The Magnificent Dope (1942, art director)
- Roxie Hart (1942, art director)
- Secret Agent of Japan (1942, art director)
- China Girl (1943, art director)
- Crash Dive (1943, art director)
- Jane Eyre (1944, art director)
- Wilson (1944, art director)
- Along Came Jones (1945, production design)
- Blood on the Sun (1945, production design)
- It's a Pleasure (1945, art director)
- Tomorrow Is Forever (1946, production design)
- The Time of Your Life (1948, production design)
- Kiss Tomorrow Goodbye (1950, production design)
- Only the Valiant (1951, production design)
- Rancho Notorious (1952, production design)
- I, the Jury (1953, art director)
- A Lion Is in the Streets (1953, production design)
- War Paint (1953, art director)
- This Is My Love (1954, production design)
- Crashout (1955, set design)
- The Indian Fighter (1955, art director)
- Top of the World (1955, art director)
- The King and Four Queens (1956, production design)
- The Gallant Hours (1960, art director)
