= Antarctic Crossing =

1958 British documentary film by George Lowe

- Directed by: George Lowe
- Produced by: James Carr
- Cinematography: George Lowe; Derek Wright
- Edited by: Dennis Gurney
- Music by: Humphrey Searle
- Production company: World Wide Pictures
- Distributed by: Rank Film Distributors
- Release date: 1958
- Running time: 47 minutes
- Country: United Kingdom
- Language: English

Antarctic Crossing is a 1958 British documentary film directed by George Lowe. The film follows Sir Vivian Fuchs on his way back from Shackleton Base. The commentary is spoken by Sir Edmund Hillary.

== Reception ==
The Monthly Film Bulletin wrote: "Skillul editing has resulted in a remarkable picture with moments of humour and despair linked by scenes of grandeur and beauty. ...This modest and factual film also contains some dramatic sequences from the original films of the Scott and Shackleton expeditions, which provide startling contrast to the often impressive colour photography of the modern parties."

Variety wrote: "Beautifully photographed, with a taut commentary which never falls into the trap of hyperbole, it is a triumph for the cameramen who brought back about nine miles of color film and to the editor, Dennis Gurney, who brought the material down to 45 minutes playing time. The pic manages to cover most of the important events of the two-year expedition."

== Accolades ==
The film was nominated for an Academy Award for Best Documentary Feature.
