= Employees Only =

1958 film

- Produced by: Kenneth G. Brown
- Narrated by: Bob Cummings
- Production company: Hughes Aircraft Company for the President's Committee on Employment of the Physically Handicapped
- Distributed by: Warner Bros.
- Release date: 1958
- Country: United States
- Language: English

Employees Only is a 1958 American short documentary film produced by Kenneth G. Brown. It was produced by Hughes Aircraft Company for the President's Committee on Employment of the Physically Handicapped and features interviews of physically disabled employees of Hughes Aircraft.

Employees Only was nominated for an Academy Award for Best Documentary Short.

== See also ==
- List of American films of 1958
