= Harold Humbrock =

American sound editor

- Born: June 4, 1905; California
- Died: February 9, 1993 (aged 87); Vancouver, Washington
- Occupation: Sound Editor
- Years active: 1954-1958

Harold Humbrock (June 4, 1905 – February 9, 1993) was an American sound editor. He was nominated at the 31st Academy Awards in the category of Best Special Effects for the film Torpedo Run. His nomination was shared with A. Arnold Gillespie.

== Filmography ==
- Deep in My Heart (1954)
- Valley of the Kings (1954)
- Bad Day at Black Rock (1955)
- Kismet (1955)
- Moonfleet (1955)
- The Scarlet Coat (1955)
- The Last Hunt (1956)
- Lust for Life (1956)
- The Barretts of Wimpole Street (1957)
- Saddle the Wind (1958)
- Torpedo Run (1958)
