= Every Day's a Holiday (1937 film) =

1937 film by A. Edward Sutherland

- Theatrical release poster
- Directed by: A. Edward Sutherland
- Screenplay by: Mae West
- Produced by: Emanuel Cohen
- Starring: Mae West; Edmund Lowe; Charles Butterworth; Charles Winninger; Walter Catlett; Lloyd Nolan
- Cinematography: Karl Struss
- Edited by: Ray Curtiss
- Music by: George Stoll
- Production company: Major Pictures
- Distributed by: Paramount Pictures
- Release date: 1937
- Running time: 80 minutes
- Country: United States
- Language: English

Every Day's a Holiday is a 1937 American comedy film starring and written by Mae West, directed by A. Edward Sutherland, and released by Paramount Pictures. The film starred Edmund Lowe, Charles Winninger, and Charles Butterworth. This was West's last film under her Paramount contract, after which she went on to make My Little Chickadee (1940) for Universal Pictures and The Heat's On (1943) for Columbia Pictures.

== Plot ==
In turn-of-the-century New York City, con artist Peaches O'Day gets into trouble with the law for trying to sell the Brooklyn Bridge, but Jim McCarey, a police captain, likes her enough that he lets her off with a promise from Peaches to leave town. She hatches a scheme instead with the wealthy Van Doon and butler Graves to perform as a singer, calling herself Fifi, disguised in a black wig.

Quade, a chief of police with political ambitions, makes a pass at "Fifi" and is rejected. In anger, he orders the club closed. Capt. McCarey refuses and becomes Quade's rival, even persuaded to run against him for mayor.

Before giving a speech at Madison Square Garden during the campaign, McCarey is kidnapped. He escapes just in time and the publicity is helpful in his election victory. It turns out that Peaches planned the whole thing, resulting in a romantic relationship with the new mayor of New York.

== Cast ==
- Mae West as Peaches O'Day
- Edmund Lowe as Capt. McCarey
- Charles Butterworth as Larmadou Graves
- Charles Winninger as Van Reighle Van Pelter Van Doon
- Walter Catlett as Nifty Bailey
- Lloyd Nolan as John Quade
- Louis Armstrong as Himself
- George Rector as Himself
- Herman Bing as Fritz Krausmeyer
- Roger Imhof as Trigger Mike
- Chester Conklin as Cabby
- Lucien Prival as Danny the Dip
- Adrian Morris as Henchman
- Francis McDonald as Henchman
- John Indrisano as Henchman
- Louis Armstrong as marching band leader (uncredited)

== Awards ==
The film was nominated an Academy Award for Best Art Direction by Wiard Ihnen.

== Quotes ==
The film contains the quote "You ought to get out of those wet clothes and into a dry martini.". This is spoken by the butler to Van Doon as the stage performance begins (at approximately 41 minutes into the film). This is the earliest known version of the quote, which was later used as "Why don't you get out of that wet coat and into a dry martini?" in The Major and the Minor (1942). In that film, the quote appears twice between minutes three and six of the film, first by Robert Benchley to Ginger Rogers ("Why don't you get out of that wet coat and into a dry martini."), and later retorted by Ginger Rogers ("And what do I get? An invitation to slip out of my wet coat and into a dry martini.").
