= The Buccaneer (1958 film) =

1958 film directed by Anthony Quinn

- Original Spanish film poster
- Directed by: Anthony Quinn
- Screenplay by: Jesse Lasky Jr. Bernice Mosk
- Based on: Lafitte the Pirate; 1930 novel by Lyle Saxon
- Produced by: Cecil B. DeMille; Henry Wilcoxon
- Starring: Yul Brynner; Charles Boyer; Charlton Heston
- Cinematography: Loyal Griggs
- Edited by: Archie Marshek
- Music by: Elmer Bernstein
- Production company: Paramount Pictures
- Distributed by: Paramount Pictures
- Release date: December 1, 1958
- Running time: 119 minutes
- Country: United States
- Language: English
- Budget: $6,000,000
- Box office: $3.2 million (est. US/ Canada rentals)

The Buccaneer is a 1958 swashbuckler-war film made by Paramount Pictures starring Yul Brynner as Jean Lafitte, Charles Boyer and Claire Bloom. Charlton Heston played a supporting role as Andrew Jackson, the second time that Heston played Jackson, having portrayed him earlier in the 1953 film The President's Lady. The film was shot in Technicolor and VistaVision, the story takes place during the War of 1812, telling a heavily fictionalized version of how the privateer Lafitte helped in the Battle of New Orleans and how he had to choose between fighting for America or for the side most likely to win, the United Kingdom.

The movie's supporting cast featured Inger Stevens, Henry Hull, E. G. Marshall, Lorne Greene, Ted de Corsia, Ed Hinton, Douglass Dumbrille and Majel Barrett. (Ty Hardin was uncredited). Anthony Quinn directed the film.

At the 31st Academy Awards for films from 1958, it was nominated for Academy Award for Best Costume Design (Color) for Ralph Jester, Edith Head and John Jensen, with the award going to Cecil Beaton for Gigi, just one of the latter's nine Academy Awards it received that year.

Possibly as a film tie-in, Johnny Horton had a big success at the time with his version of the song "The Battle of New Orleans".

== Plot ==
During the War of 1812, American forces, under Andrew Jackson, defeated the British, under Major General Sir Edward Pakenham at Chalmette. Control of New Orleans was important to the American and British forces as it provided control of the entire Mississippi River Basin. Whoever controlled New Orleans would obtain certain victory. Capture of New Orleans via the Mississippi River was impossible, but access through the bayous was possible. These bayous were under the control of the pirate Jean Laffite. General Andrew Jackson seeks Lafitte's aid in thwarting the British forces, offering him a pardon and American citizenship in return.

== Cast ==
- Yul Brynner as Jean Lafitte
- Claire Bloom as Bonnie Brown
- Charles Boyer as Dominique You
- Inger Stevens as Annette Claiborne
- Henry Hull as Ezra Peavey
- E. G. Marshall as Governor William C. C. Claiborne
- Charlton Heston as General Andrew Jackson
- Lorne Greene as Mercier
- Ted de Corsia as Captain Rumbo
- Douglass Dumbrille as Collector of The Port
- Sir Lancelot as Scipio
- Robert Warwick as Captain Lockyer
- Paul Newlan as Captain Flint
- Norma Varden as Madame Hilaire
- Onslow Stevens as Phipps
- James Seay as Creole Militia Officer
- Henry Brandon as British Major
- Mike Mazurki as Tarsus
- Madame Sul-Te-Wan as Vendor
- Ken Terrell as Pirate
- Majel Barrett as Townswoman #1
- Ty Hardin as Soldier (Uncredited)
- Cecil B. DeMille as Himself (uncredited)

== Production ==
The Buccaneer's budget was $6 million. $1.2 million was given for the promotion of the picture. Quinn was given five stars, fifty-five featured actors, 100 bit actors, 12,000 extras, 60,000 props, $100,000 worth of antique furniture, Spanish moss, and cypress trees.

== Historical accuracy ==
Claiborne's only surviving daughter, Sophronie (or Sophronia) Louise Claiborne, was only two years old at the time of the battle. The romance with Lafitte is complete fiction.

The interactions between Jackson and Lafitte, including the seemingly dramatized but actually accurate depiction of Lafitte sneaking into Andrew Jackson's window, Lafitte and the British Royal Navy officers, as well as between Jackson and the "leading citizens" of New Orleans, are accurate. About those scenes, screenwriter Jesse L. Lasky Jr. said that "the actual historic events in question are themselves so over the top that all I really had to do was line up the dialogue, and even then only some of it." He added, "The only real job was shoe-horning a romance into it."

== 1938 film ==
The film is a remake of the 1938 film of the same name, which starred Fredric March and Akim Tamiroff (Boyer played Tamiroff's role in the remake). The earlier version was produced and directed by Cecil B. DeMille, but he was seriously ill by the time the 1958 version was made, so he was only the executive producer of the remake, leaving his then son-in-law, Anthony Quinn, to direct. It was the only film that Quinn ever directed. Henry Wilcoxon, DeMille's longtime friend, who made frequent appearances in his films, was the actual producer, and DeMille received screen credit as "supervised by Cecil B. Demille", though students of his films would probably find that his touch is obvious throughout the film.

== Reception ==
=== Critical response ===
Staff writers for Variety wrote in their review: "Continuity-wise, Buccaneer is a scrambled affair in the early reels. Open to question, also, are the story angles in the screenplay which derives from a previous Buccaneer scenario put out by DeMille in 1938 and, in turn, from an adaptation of the original book, Lafitte the Pirate, by Lyle Saxon."

=== Release ===
The Buccaneer was released in New York City theatres during Christmas week of 1958. The film was released on DVD on February 28, 2012, by Olive Films.
