= Executive Order 10555 =

1954 United States executive order

- Establishing a Seal for the President's Committee on Employment of the Physically Handicapped

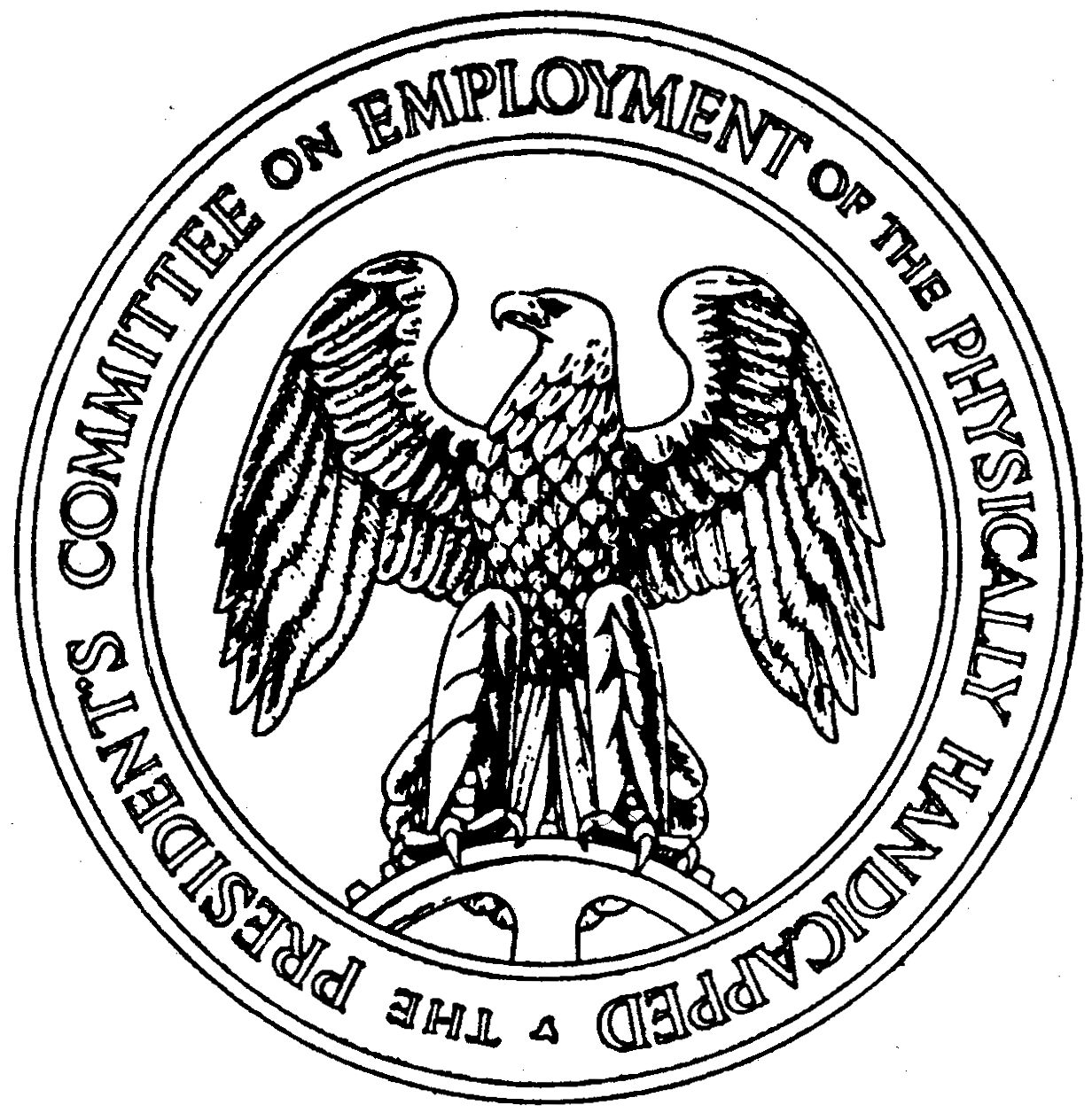
- Black and white depiction of the seal
- Type: Executive order
- Number: 10555
- President: Dwight D. Eisenhower
- Signed: August 23, 1954

Summary
- Established the Seal of the President's Committee on the Employment of the Physically Handicapped

Executive Order 10555, signed by President Dwight D. Eisenhower on August 23, 1954, established a Seal for the President's Committee on Employment of the Physically Handicapped.

The Committee was succeeded by the President's Committee on Employment of People with Disabilities, which in turn was made into the Office of Disability Employment Policy, an agency in the Department of Labor, in 2001.

== See also ==
- Executive order (United States)
