= Torpedo Run =

1958 film by Joseph Pevney

- Directed by: Joseph Pevney
- Written by: William Wister Haines; Richard Sale
- Screenplay by: Richard Sale
- Produced by: Edmund Grainger
- Starring: Glenn Ford; Ernest Borgnine; Diane Brewster
- Cinematography: George J. Folsey
- Edited by: Gene Ruggiero
- Production company: Metro-Goldwyn-Mayer
- Distributed by: Metro-Goldwyn-Mayer
- Release dates: October 23, 1958 (Premiere); October 24, 1958
- Running time: 98 minutes
- Country: United States
- Language: English
- Budget: $1.5 million
- Box office: $2.6 million

Torpedo Run is a 1958 American war film directed by Joseph Pevney and starring Glenn Ford as a World War II submarine commander in the Pacific who is obsessed with sinking a particular Japanese aircraft carrier. The film's working title was Hell Below. It was filmed in CinemaScope and Metrocolor.

A. Arnold Gillespie and Harold Humbrock were nominated for an Academy Award for Best Visual Effects.

== Plot ==
In October 1942, ComSubPac directs the American submarine Greyfish, under Commander Barney Doyle, to a Japanese convoy that includes the Shinaru, one of the Japanese aircraft carriers that led the attack on Pearl Harbor. Doyle also learns the target's escort includes a transport ship carrying American prisoners from an internment camp in the Philippines where his wife and child were being held. Doyle's second-in-command, Lieutenant Archer Sloan, tries to talk his friend into letting him handle the torpedo run, sparing Doyle direct responsibility for his family's possible death. In the end, the transport is so close to the carrier that Sloan begs Doyle to abort the attack. Doyle fires his torpedoes, hoping to miss the Yoshida Maru and hit the target. Carefully counting the seconds, they realize one of their torpedoes has hit the transport. Hoping to lure the sub to the surface, the Japanese make no attempt to rescue the survivors. Through the periscope, Doyle can see women and children grasping for pieces of floating wreckage. So as not to endanger his crew, he is forced to leave the prisoners to die.

Doyle follows the Shinaru into Tokyo Bay, but fails to sink it. After surviving a relentless bombardment of depth charges, the Greyfish returns to base at Pearl Harbor. While there, Sloan meets alone with Admiral Setton, accepts Sloan's assessment that, despite experiencing intense guilt for the civilian transport's destruction. Setton offers Sloan a promotion and his own command, but he refuses on the grounds he believes Doyle is still fit for command and wishes to still serve as his second-in-command. Setton then agrees to give the Greyfish "one more trip" to try to sink the Shinaru - but on the condition that Sloan must take the promotion if Doyle fails. But when the Greyfish is assigned a quiet, out-of-the-way patrol area off the Alaskan coast, Doyle thinks he has been betrayed by both Setton and Sloan, and reveals that he knew about the latter's offer of his own command all along. Then word comes that the Shinaru is heading for Japanese-occupied Kiska Harbor. The Greyfish proceeds to the harbor.

An initial encounter with the Shinaru results in the submarine's periscope being disabled and the radio antenna destroyed. Nonetheless, Doyle plans a second attack, a "blind" one with little chance of success. After firing torpedoes, the Greyfish is forced to the ocean floor by a depth-charge attack. The crewmen use Momsen lungs to escape their doomed submarine. When they reach the surface, they are taken aboard another American submarine, the Bluefin. Doyle asks the Bluefin's captain for confirmation that they hit the Shinaru. The Bluefin's captain looks through the periscope, shares the view briefly with Doyle and Sloan, and then, over the intercom, describes the carrier's sinking for Doyle's crew.

== Cast ==
- Glenn Ford as Lieutenant Commander / Commander Barney Doyle
- Diane Brewster as Jane Doyle
- Ernest Borgnine as Lieutenant / Lieutenant Commander Archer "Archie" Sloan
- Philip Ober as Vice Admiral Samuel Setton
- Richard Carlyle as Commander Don Adams
- Dean Jones as Lieutenant Jake "Fuzz" Foley
- Robert Hardy as Lieutenant Redley (R.N.)
- Don Keefer as Ensign Ron Milligan
- L. Q. Jones as "Hash" Benson
- Fredd Wayne as Orville "Goldy" Goldstein

== Release ==
The film had its premiere on October 23, 1958, for Navy and government officials at the Loew's Capitol theatre in Washington D.C.

== Reception ==
=== Critical ===
Bosley Crowther of The New York Times was unimpressed, writing, "Stereotypes of pig-boat [submarine] fighting that were stale in Destination Tokyo are played and replayed in this picture as if they were freshly inspired. ... it is also played in a highly hackneyed fashion and often faked with preposterous miniatures."

=== Box office ===
According to MGM records, the film made $1,145,000 in the U.S. and Canada and $1,435,000 elsewhere, resulting in a loss of $195,000.

== Home media ==
The film has been released on VHS and DVD, the latter in Warner's Archive Collection.

== See also ==
- List of American films of 1958
