= Ralph Keene =

Indian-born British screenwriter, producer and film director. (1902–1963)

- Born: 7 July 1902; Mysore, British India
- Died: January 1963 (aged 60); Ipswich, Suffolk; United Kingdom
- Occupations: Director, Producer, Screenwriter
- Years active: 1937–1963 (film)

Ralph Keene (1902–1963) was an Indian-born British screenwriter, producer and film director. He is generally known for his work on documentaries. Following the Second World War he shot a number of non-fiction films outside Britain including in Cyprus, Ceylon and Persia.

== Selected filmography ==
=== Screenwriter ===
- A Boy, a Girl and a Bike (1949)
- Double Confession (1950)

== Bibliography ==
- Barsam, Richard Meran. Nonfiction Film: A Critical History.
