= World Wide Pictures (UK) =

World Wide Group
- Company type: Film production
- Industry: Aerospace & Defence Educational Institutions and Foundations Global Software Companies Manufacturing, Engineering & Tech Marketing & Advertising Agencies Meetings, Incentives, Conferences & Events
- Genre: Documentary, Corporate, Industrial Films, Promotional Films, Propaganda, Launch Events,
- Predecessor: World Wide Pictures
- Founded: 1935
- Founder: James Carr
- Fate: Active
- Headquarters: Leeds, United Kingdom
- Number of locations: 3 International Offices
- Area served: Worldwide
- Key people: Karen Hayes (Managing director) Hugo Simoes (Multimedia director) Nick Bramley (Client relationship director) Sanjiv K Bandlish (CEO - India)
- Services: Animation Content Distribution & Media Delivery Event Micro-sites & Hosting Live Streaming & Broadcast Solutions Multimedia Development (Hybrid & Virtual Events) Technical Event Production Venue Support & Technical Consultancy Video Production
- Owner: Karen Hayes (Managing Director)
- Number of employees: 15+
- Website: World Wide Group

World Wide Group is a film, television and multimedia production company established in 1935. Its origins were in the British Documentary Movement founded by John Grierson in the 1930s, producing propaganda and information films for the government during World War II. After the war, it specialised in sponsored films, advertisements, industrial and promotional films. Two early successes were The Undefeated (1950), made to promote state welfare services available to disabled ex-servicemen, and David (1951), commissioned to promote Wales at the Festival of Britain. The company remains active making advertisements, corporate videos, exhibitions and multimedia productions.
