= Edith Head =

American costume designer (1897–1981)

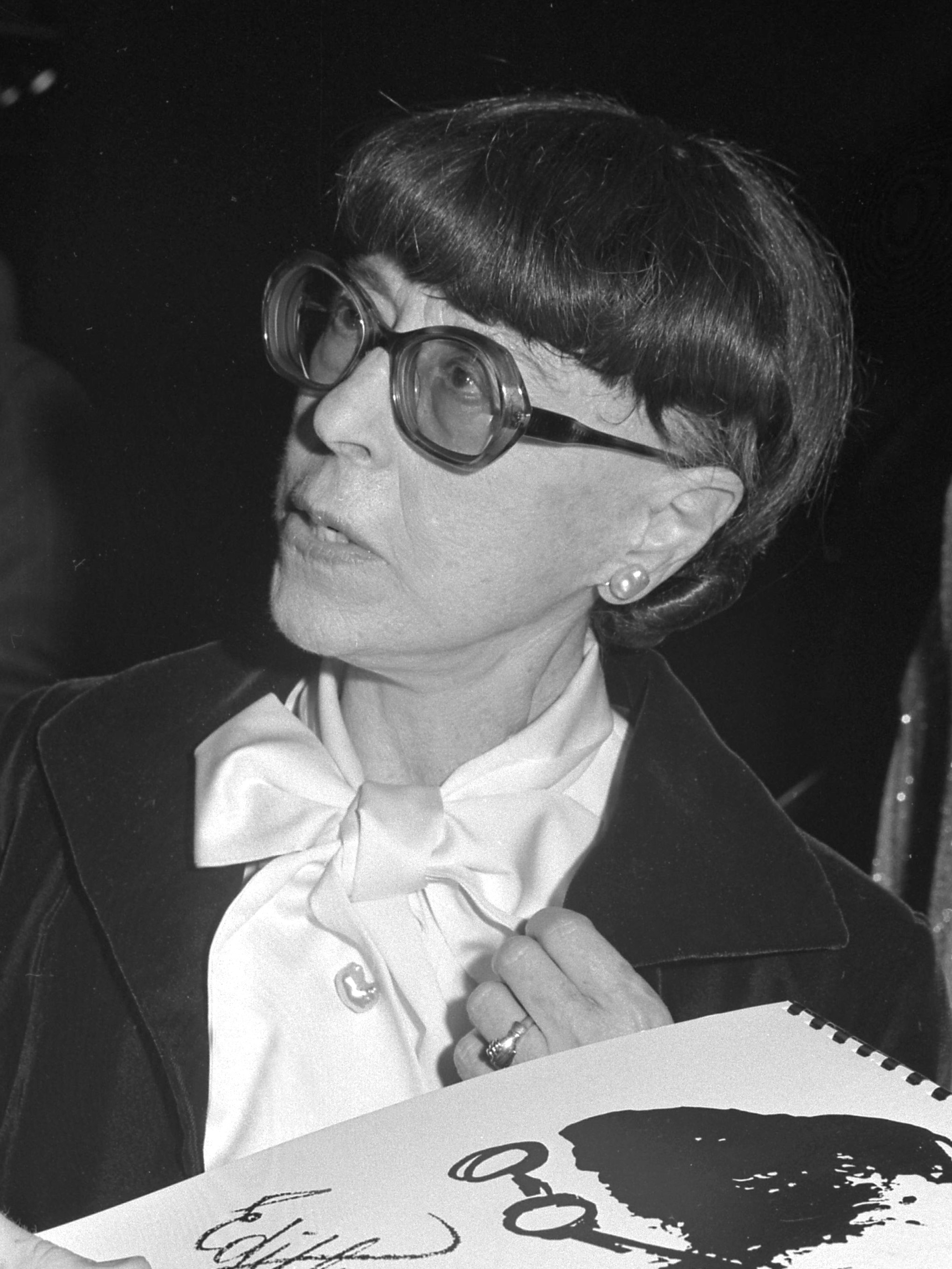
- Head in 1976
- Born: Edith Claire Posener; October 28, 1897; San Bernardino, California, U.S.
- Died: October 24, 1981 (aged 83); Los Angeles, California, U.S.
- Resting place: Forest Lawn Memorial Park, Glendale, California
- Education: University of California, Berkeley (B.A.); Stanford University (M.A.)
- Occupation: Costume designer
- Years active: 1923–1981
- Spouses: Charles Head (m. 1923; div. 1938) Wiard Ihnen (m. 1940; died 1979)
- Awards: Academy Award for Best Costume Design (8 wins)

Edith Claire Head (née Posener; October 28, 1897 – October 24, 1981) was an American film costume designer. With a total of 8 wins out of 35 nominations, she is the most decorated woman at the Academy Awards. She also holds the Guinness World Record for most-credited costume designer in film history, with a total of 432 credits.

Raised between California and Nevada, Head earned degrees from the University of California, Berkeley and Stanford University before beginning a career as a French and Spanish languages teacher. After taking courses at the Chouinard Art Institute in Los Angeles, she was hired in 1923 as a costume sketch artist at Famous Players–Lasky, which later became Paramount Pictures. She won acclaim for her design of Dorothy Lamour’s trademark sarong in the 1936 film The Jungle Princess, and became a household name after the Academy Award for Best Costume Design was created in 1948. Head was considered exceptional for her close working relationships with her subjects, with whom she consulted extensively; these included virtually every top female star in Hollywood.

Head worked at Paramount for 44 years, and was frequently loaned out by the studio for work on projects for other studios. While under contract at Paramount, she designed the costumes for several films by Alfred Hitchcock, including Notorious (1946), Vertigo (1958), The Birds (1963), and Marnie (1964). In 1968, after Paramount declined to renew her contract, Hitchcock invited her to join Universal Pictures. There she earned her eighth and final Academy Award for her work on The Sting in 1973.

Outside of film, Head was commissioned to design the official women's uniform for the United States Coast Guard in the 1970s, due to the increasing number of women in the Coast Guard, for which she received the Meritorious Public Service Award.

== Early life ==
Head was born Edith Claire Posener on October 28, 1897 in San Bernardino, California, (Note: Head was known to joke about her age and birthplace, often providing conflicting answers. Her obituary in the Los Angeles Times notes: The five foot, 1 1/4-inch tall designer, who began her career by outfitting an elephant in cloth-of-gold for a 1923 silent movie, had admitted to being in her 70s, and also more cheerfully, to lying about her age. But acquaintances reckoned her to be about 80, or even older... Head’s versions of her youth and past were sketchy, and almost as numerous as the people she told them to. She had variously claimed to have been born in Mexico; in Arizona; in Searchlight, Nev; in Hollywood and in San Bernardino, where she claimed a courthouse fire destroyed her birth records. Because of this, some contemporary reports at the time of her death cite her age as 73. However, numerous sources—as well as accounts from biographers and historians such as Laura L. S. Bauer, David Chierichetti, and Colin Naylor—state Head was born on October 28, 1897, in San Bernardino, California. In her 1983 book Edith Head's Hollywood, she also provides San Bernardino as her birthplace.) the daughter of Ashkenazi Jewish parents, Anna E. (nee Levy) and Max Posener, both of German-Jewish and Austrian-Jewish ancestry. Her father was a naturalized American citizen from Germany who came to the United States in 1876 at age eighteen, while her American mother was born in St. Louis, Missouri in 1875, the daughter of an Austrian-Jewish father and a Bavarian mother. Shortly before Head's birth, her father opened a small haberdashery in San Bernardino. The business failed within a year, after which he abandoned the family and relocated to El Paso, Texas.

In 1901, Head's mother Anna married Frank Spare, a mining engineer from Pennsylvania. Anna and Frank passed Edith off as their biological child, giving her his surname, and raised her in his Roman Catholic faith. Due to her stepfather's job, the family moved frequently during her childhood to various mining camps, with a significant portion spent in rural Searchlight, Nevada. A shy and introverted only child, Head often spent time building makeshift dollhouses out of cardboard boxes, and creating figures out of greasewood that naturally grew in the desert. She would also create costumes for animals, including her pet dog and cat, as well as wild horned lizards. "I had no other children for playmates," she recalled. "Naturally, all of my intensive imagination in child's play had to be connected to activities I could pursue alone." Head was teased by classmates due to her front teeth never growing in properly, and because of this, rarely smiled.

She completed her elementary school education in Redding, California in 1911, before the family lived for a period in Mexico, where Head learned to speak Spanish. Head and her mother subsequently relocated to Los Angeles, where she graduated from Los Angeles High School.

Head enrolled at the University of California, Berkeley in 1915, and earned a Bachelor of Arts degree in letters and sciences with honors in French. She subsequently enrolled at Stanford University, where she earned a Master of Arts degree in romance languages in 1920. She became a language teacher with her first position as a replacement at The Bishop's School in La Jolla teaching French and Spanish. After one year, she took a position teaching French at the Hollywood School for Girls, where her students included Cecilia and Katherine DeMille, daughters of studio executive Cecil B. DeMille. Wanting a slightly higher salary, she told the school that she could also teach art, even though she had only briefly studied the discipline in high school. To improve her drawing skills, at this point rudimentary, she took evening classes at the Otis Art Institute and Chouinard Art College.

On July 25, 1923, she married Charles Head, a salesman for the Southern California Super Fine Metals Company, and the brother of one of her Chouinard classmates, Betty Head. Due to Charles's drinking problem and her reduced teaching salary during the summer months, Head began seeking work as a sketch artist to help supplement their income.

== Career ==
=== 1923—1929: Famous Players–Lasky ===
In 1923, despite lacking significant art, design, and costume design experience, the 26-year-old Head was hired as a costume sketch artist at the Famous Players–Lasky studios, which was later absorbed by Paramount Pictures. Later she admitted to "borrowing" other students' sketches for her job interview with the studio: "I was studying seascape and all I could draw was oceans. I needed a portfolio, so I borrowed sketches—I didn't steal them, I asked everybody in the class for a few costume design sketches. And I had the most fantastic assortment you've ever seen in your life. When you get a class of forty to give you sketches, you get a nice selection."

At Paramount, Head studied under lead designers Howard Greer, and later, Travis Banton. Head recounted the experience favourably, saying:

Travis Banton and Howard Greer sort of adopted me, and I went with them to all their fittings. I was accepted as part of the team in the fitting room, which also included the head fitter and usually a wardrobe girl. Sometimes I just watched and took notes; I did whatever I was told. With both Howard and Travis there was never any feeling that I would be a threat to them, as is so often the case in boss-and-assistant relationships in any profession. They were secure in their own careers. Both went overboard in encouraging and helping me. I think I had the greatest break that any young designer ever had. Working for them was the kind of training you couldn't get any place else, in any school in the world.

Head began designing costumes for the studio's silent films, commencing with The Wanderer in 1925 and, by the 1930s, had established herself as one of Hollywood's leading costume designers.

=== 1930–1967: Paramount Pictures ===
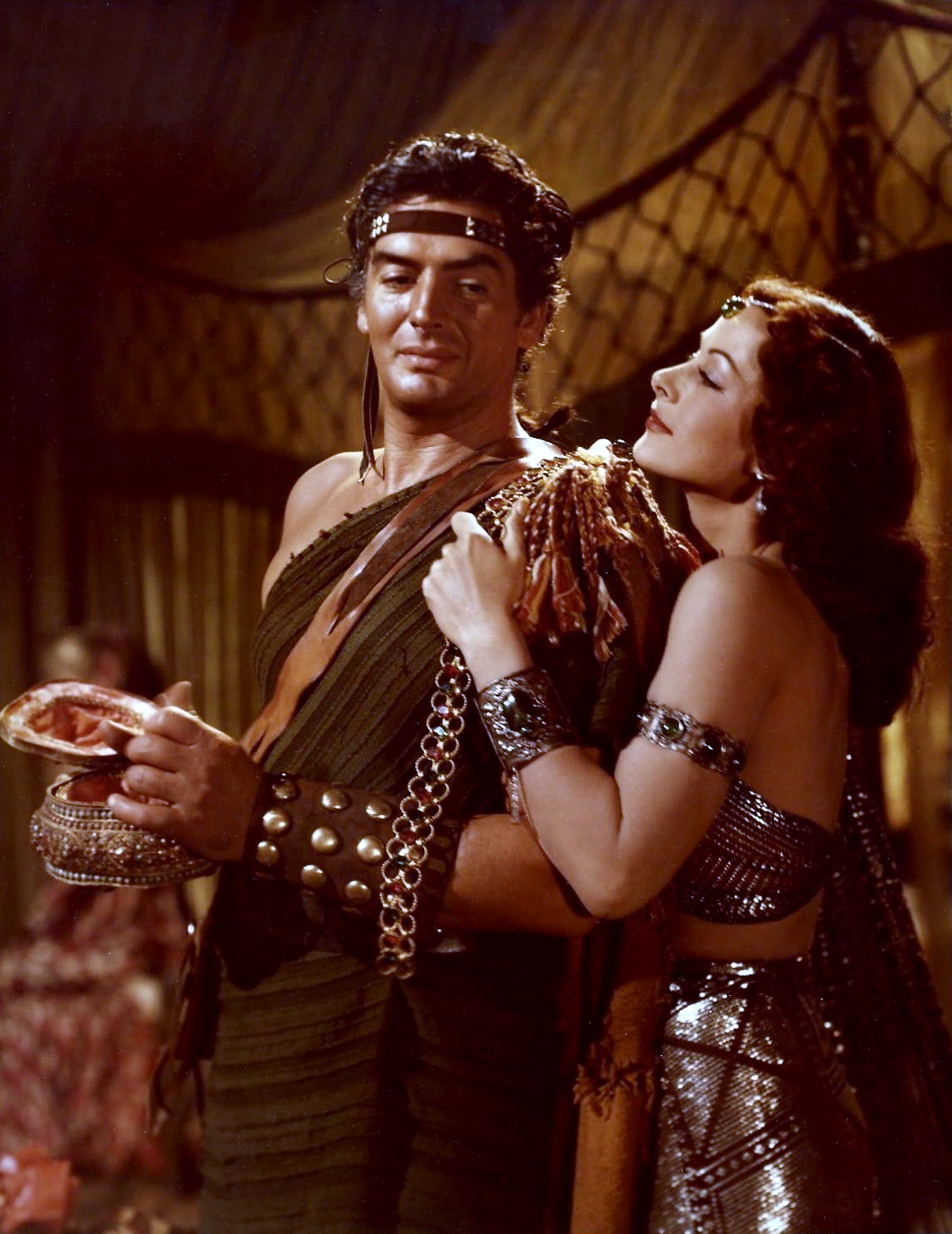
Head's costume designs for Victor Mature and Hedy Lamarr in Samson and Delilah (1949), for which she won an Oscar

Head remained employed by Paramount Pictures after the studio absorbed Famous Players–Lasky. After Banton's resignation in 1938 she took over as head designer for the studio. Her association with the "sarong" dress designed for Dorothy Lamour in The Hurricane (1937) made her well known among the general public, although Head was a more restrained designer than either Banton or Adrian.

She gained public attention for the top mink-lined gown she created for Ginger Rogers in Lady in the Dark (1944), which caused much comment owing to the mood of wartime austerity. The establishment, in 1949, of the Academy Award for Costume Design further boosted her career, giving her a record-breaking run of Award nominations and wins, beginning with her nomination for The Emperor Waltz. Head and other film designers like Adrian became well known to the public.

Head was known for her particular working style and, unlike many of her male contemporaries, usually consulted extensively with the female stars with whom she worked. As a result, she was a favorite among many of the leading female stars of the 1940s and 1950s, such as Ginger Rogers, Bette Davis, Barbara Stanwyck, Jane Wyman, Rita Hayworth, Shirley MacLaine, Grace Kelly, Audrey Hepburn, and Elizabeth Taylor. In fact, Head was frequently "loaned out" by Paramount to other studios at the request of their female stars. She herself always dressed plainly, preferring thick-framed glasses and conservative two-piece suits.

In 1946, Head worked for the first time with director Alfred Hitchcock on his spy film Notorious. Head was loaned from Paramount to Radio-Keith-Orpheum (RKO) pictures to work with Hitchcock on this film, at the request of actress Ingrid Bergman. At this time it was usual for costume designers to reflect their own style. Head had a different outlook on this, thinking that it was more important to design pieces that reflected the character. During their time working on Notorious, Head and Hitchcock found that they were like-minded and had the same bluntness in their careers and attitudes. The costumes she designed for this film reflected restraint and the need to blend in. This style suited what Hitchcock was looking for, since he did not want the clothes to be the focal point. The two went on to work together many more times.

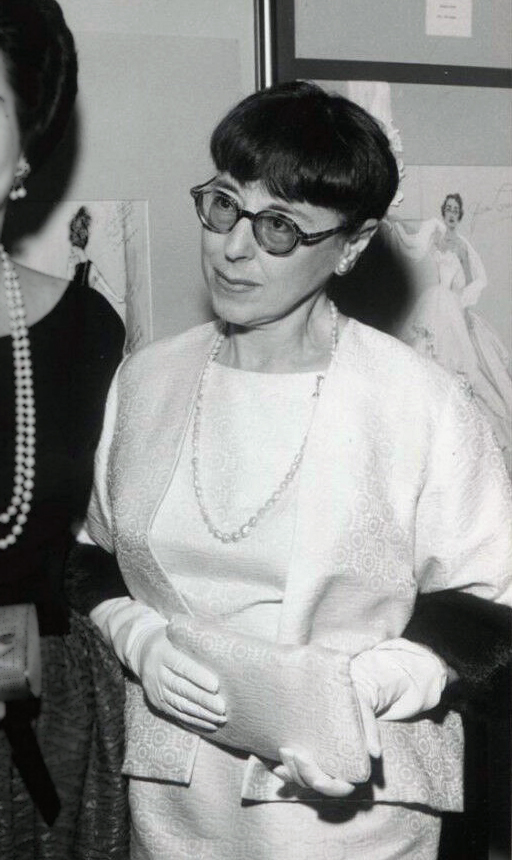
Head in 1955

On February 3, 1955 (Season 5 Episode 21), Head appeared as a contestant on the Groucho Marx quiz show You Bet Your Life. She and her partner won a total of $1,540. Her winnings were donated to charity.

Head wrote two books describing her career and design philosophy, The Dress Doctor (1959) and How To Dress For Success (1967). These books were re-edited in 2008 and 2011, respectively.

=== 1968–1981: Universal Pictures ===
In 1968, at the age of 70, Head left Paramount Pictures and was contracted with Universal Pictures, where she remained until her death in 1981. By this point, Hollywood was rapidly changing from what it had been during Head's heyday in the 1930s-1940s. Studio-based production was giving way to outdoors and on-scene shooting, and many of the actresses from that era whom she worked with and knew intimately had retired or were working less. She thus turned more of her attention to TV, where some old friends such as Olivia de Havilland had begun working. She made a cameo appearance in 1973 on the detective series Columbo beside Anne Baxter, playing herself and displaying her Oscars to date. In 1974, Head received a final Oscar win for her work on The Sting (1973).

In the late 1970s, Head was asked to design a woman's uniform for the United States Coast Guard, because of the increasing number of women in the Coast Guard. Head called the assignment a highlight in her career and received the Meritorious Public Service Award for her efforts. Her designs for a TV mini-series based on the novel Little Women were well received. She also designed the costumes for Elizabeth Taylor in the Hallmark Hall of Fame segment "Return Engagement" (1978).

Her last film project was the black-and-white comedy Dead Men Don't Wear Plaid (1982), starring Steve Martin and Carl Reiner, a job Head was chosen for because of her expertise on 1940s fashions. She modeled Martin and Reiner's outfits on classic film noir and the movie, released in theaters just after her death, was dedicated to her memory.

== Design style ==
Unlike most other designers of her time, Head never undertook couture or wholesale fashion work, opting to "work only in the context of a certain actress in a certain film." Olivia de Havilland, whose costumes were designed by Head for the films To Each His Own (1946) and The Heiress (1949), said: "Every dress was perfect. Just putting them on, I became these women and I knew right where they were in the stories. Edith even came to New York with me before The Heiress and we studied the underwear at the Brooklyn Museum so it would be absolutely authentic."

Head herself regarded her work as apart from the world of fashion design, and did not consider herself a fashion designer. Commenting in 1978 on her view of her profession, she said:

I think that most people don't realize motion pictures are not "fashion." So many people say to me, "Isn't it lovely to be a fashion designer and dress these beautiful stars?" That is not what happens. I get a script, and the script says, "In this film, Grace Kelly is playing a princess, she's beautiful, and she has fabulous clothes." The next script says, "Grace Kelly is a middle-aged, dowdy housewife"... so you do dowdy clothes. I can do tacky clothes, dowdy clothes, sexy clothes, horrible clothes... anything the world should want—male, female, or animals... Costume design is like theater. Costume design is to tell a story. It has nothing to do with fashion at all, unless it is a fashion picture.

== Personal life ==
On July 25, 1923, she married Charles Head. The marriage ended in divorce in 1938, though she continued to be known professionally as Edith Head for the remainder of her life. She then married art director Wiard Ihnen in 1940, a marriage that lasted until his death from prostate cancer in 1979.

Though both of her parents were Jewish, Head was raised practicing Roman Catholicism, the faith of her stepfather, and remained a "staunch Catholic" through her later life. She was a regular parishioner of Good Shepherd Catholic Church in Beverly Hills.

== Death ==
In 1972, Head was diagnosed with myelofibrosis, an incurable bone marrow cancer which causes excessive, uncontrolled scar tissue accumulation in the bone marrow. To treat the disease, Head received regular blood transfusions to prevent severe anemia. Head died at Good Samaritan Hospital in Los Angeles of complications from myelofibrosis on October 24, 1981.

A private funeral mass was held at Good Shepherd Catholic Church in Beverly Hills, where actress Bette Davis gave a brief eulogy. Also in attendance were Elizabeth Taylor, Janet Leigh, Ann Sothern, George Peppard, Loretta Young, Jane Wyman, and Lew Wasserman. She is interred at Forest Lawn Memorial Park in Glendale, California.

== Legacy ==
Head holds the distinction of being the most-credited costume designer in history, with a total of 432 film credits to her name.

Over the course of her career, she was nominated for a total of 35 Academy Awards, annually from 1949 (the first year that the Oscar for Best Costume Design was awarded) through 1966, and won eight times—receiving more Oscars than any other woman.

Head's star on the Hollywood Walk of Fame, which she received in 1974, is located at 6504 Hollywood Boulevard.

== Filmography ==
As a costume designer, Head has a total of 432 credits to her name.

=== Selected design credits ===
Year	Film	Notable performer(s)	Notes	Ref.
1927	Wings	Clara Bow	Uncredited	
1929	The Saturday Night Kid	Clara Bow	Uncredited	
1929	Wolf Song	Lupe Vélez	Uncredited	
1933	She Done Him Wrong	Mae West		
1934	Little Miss Marker	Shirley Temple		
1936	The Jungle Princess	Dorothy Lamour		
1936	Rhythm on the Range	Frances Farmer		
1937	Ebb Tide	Frances Farmer		
1937	The Hurricane	Dorothy Lamour		
1938	Dangerous to Know	Anna May Wong		
1938	Zaza	Claudette Colbert		
1939	The Cat and the Canary	Paulette Goddard		
1940	Road to Singapore	Dorothy Lamour		
1940	Untamed	Patricia Morison		
1941	The Lady Eve	Barbara Stanwyck		
1941	Ball of Fire	Barbara Stanwyck		
1941	Sullivan's Travels	Veronica Lake		
1942	I Married a Witch	Veronica Lake		
1942	Road to Zanzibar	Dorothy Lamour		
1942	Road to Morocco	Dorothy Lamour		
1942	Holiday Inn	Fred Astaire		
1942	Holiday Inn	Marjorie Reynolds		
1943	Flesh and Fantasy	Barbara Stanwyck		
1944	Double Indemnity	Barbara Stanwyck		
1944	Lady in the Dark	Ginger Rogers		
1944	Tender Comrade	Ginger Rogers		
1944	The Uninvited	Ruth Hussey		
1944	The Uninvited	Gail Russell		
1944	I'll Be Seeing You	Ginger Rogers		
1945	Incendiary Blonde	Betty Hutton		
1945	The Lost Weekend	Ray Milland		
1945	The Lost Weekend	Jane Wyman		
1945	Masquerade in Mexico	Dorothy Lamour		
1945	Christmas in Connecticut	Barbara Stanwyck		
1946	My Reputation	Barbara Stanwyck		
1946	The Blue Dahlia	Veronica Lake		
1946	Notorious	Ingrid Bergman		
1946	Road to Utopia	Dorothy Lamour		
1947	Road to Rio	Dorothy Lamour		
1947	The Two Mrs. Carrolls	Barbara Stanwyck		
1947	Cry Wolf	Barbara Stanwyck		
1947	The Perils of Pauline	Betty Hutton		
1947	The Farmer's Daughter	Loretta Young		
1948	June Bride	Bette Davis		
1948	Beyond Glory	Alan Ladd		
1949	My Friend Irma	Diana Lynn		
1949	The Heiress	Olivia de Havilland		
1949	Samson and Delilah	Hedy Lamarr		
1949	Samson and Delilah	Angela Lansbury		
1950	All About Eve	Bette Davis		
1950	The Furies	Barbara Stanwyck		
1950	Sunset Boulevard	Gloria Swanson		
1951	A Place in the Sun	Montgomery Clift		
1951	A Place in the Sun	Elizabeth Taylor		
1951	A Place in the Sun	Shelley Winters		
1951	Payment on Demand	Bette Davis		
1951	Here Comes the Groom	Jane Wyman		
1952	Just for You	Jane Wyman		
1952	Something to Live For	Joan Fontaine		
1952	Road to Bali	Dorothy Lamour		
1952	Stolen Face	Lizabeth Scott		
1953	Scared Stiff	Carmen Miranda		
1953	Houdini	Janet Leigh		
1953	The War of the Worlds	Ann Robinson		
1953	Those Redheads from Seattle	Agnes Moorehead		
1953	Roman Holiday	Audrey Hepburn		
1954	Sabrina	Audrey Hepburn		
1954	Elephant Walk	Elizabeth Taylor		
1954	White Christmas	Rosemary Clooney		
1954	White Christmas	Danny Kaye		
1954	Rear Window	Grace Kelly		
1955	To Catch a Thief	Grace Kelly		
1955	To Catch a Thief	Cary Grant		
1955	Artists and Models	Shirley MacLaine		
1955	Lucy Gallant	Jane Wyman		
1956	The Man Who Knew Too Much	Doris Day		
1956	The Ten Commandments	Anne Baxter		
1957	Three Violent People	Anne Baxter		
1957	Witness for the Prosecution	Marlene Dietrich		
1957	Funny Face	Audrey Hepburn		
1958	The Matchmaker	Shirley MacLaine		
1958	Separate Tables	Rita Hayworth		
1958	Teacher's Pet	Doris Day		
1958	Teacher's Pet	Clark Gable		
1958	Vertigo	Kim Novak		
1958	Vertigo	James Stewart		
1959	Alias Jesse James	Rhonda Fleming		
1959	That Kind of Woman	Sophia Loren		
1960	Heller in Pink Tights	Sophia Loren		
1961	The Facts of Life	Lucille Ball		
1961	Breakfast at Tiffany's	Audrey Hepburn		
1961	Blue Hawaii	Elvis Presley		
1962	The Man Who Shot Liberty Valance	John Wayne		
1962	Hatari!	John Wayne		
1963	Donovan's Reef	Dorothy Lamour		
1963	Critic's Choice	Lucille Ball		
1963	I Could Go On Singing	Judy Garland		
1963	Love with the Proper Stranger	Natalie Wood		
1963	The Birds	Tippi Hedren		
1964	Sex and the Single Girl	Natalie Wood		
1964	Marnie	Tippi Hedren		
1964	Marnie	Diane Baker		
1964	What a Way to Go!	Shirley MacLaine		
1964	Man's Favorite Sport?	Rock Hudson		
1964	Man's Favorite Sport?	Paula Prentiss		
1964	The Carpetbaggers	Carroll Baker		
1965	Harlow	Carroll Baker		
1965	Love Has Many Faces	Lana Turner		
1965	Ship of Fools	Christiane Schmidtmer		
1965	John Goldfarb, Please Come Home!	Shirley MacLaine		
1965	The Sons of Katie Elder	John Wayne		
1965	Inside Daisy Clover	Natalie Wood		
1965	The Great Race	Natalie Wood		
1966	Penelope	Natalie Wood		
1966	This Property Is Condemned	Natalie Wood		
1966	El Dorado	John Wayne		
1966	Waco	Jane Russell		
1966	Torn Curtain	Julie Andrews		
1966	Torn Curtain	Paul Newman		
1967	Hotel	Merle Oberon		
1967	Barefoot in the Park	Jane Fonda		
1968	Berserk!	Joan Crawford		
1968	Hellfighters	John Wayne		
1969	Sweet Charity	Chita Rivera		
1969	Butch Cassidy and the Sundance Kid	Paul Newman		
1969	Butch Cassidy and the Sundance Kid	Katharine Ross		
1969	Topaz	Claude Jade		
1970	Myra Breckinridge	Mae West		
1973	Ash Wednesday	Elizabeth Taylor		
1973	The Sting	Robert Redford		
1974	Earthquake	Ava Gardner	Uncredited	
1974	Earthquake	Charlton Heston		
1975	The Great Waldo Pepper	Robert Redford		
1975	The Great Waldo Pepper	Susan Sarandon		
1975	Rooster Cogburn	Katharine Hepburn		
1975	The Man Who Would Be King	Michael Caine		
1975	The Man Who Would Be King	Sean Connery		
1976	Gable and Lombard	Jill Clayburgh		
1976	Family Plot	Karen Black		
1976	W. C. Fields and Me	Valerie Perrine		
1978	Sextette	Mae West		
1980	The Last Married Couple in America	Valerie Harper		
1980	The Last Married Couple in America	Natalie Wood		
1982	Dead Men Don't Wear Plaid	Steve Martin	Final feature film credit; posthumous release	

=== Screen appearances ===
Year	Title	Role	Notes	Ref.
1955	Lucy Gallant	Herself		
1961	The Pleasure of His Company	Dress designer	Uncredited	
1966	The Oscar	Herself		
1973	Columbo	Herself	Episode: "Requiem for a Falling Star"	

== Accolades ==
Head received eight Academy Awards for Best Costume Design, more than any other person, from a total of 35 nominations.

Institution	Year	Category	Nominated work	Outcome	Ref.
Academy Awards	1949	Best Costume Design – Color	The Emperor Waltz	Nominated	
Academy Awards	1950	Best Costume Design – Black & White	The Heiress	Won	
Academy Awards	1951	Best Costume Design – Black & White	All About Eve	Won	
Academy Awards	1951	Best Costume Design – Color	Samson and Delilah	Won (Note: Shared with Dorothy Jeakins, Elois Jenssen, Gile Steele, and Gwen Wakeling.)	
Academy Awards	1952	Best Costume Design – Black & White	A Place in the Sun	Won	
Academy Awards	1953	Best Costume Design – Black & White	Carrie	Nominated	
Academy Awards	1953	Best Costume Design – Color	The Greatest Show on Earth	Nominated	
Academy Awards	1954	Best Costume Design – Black & White	Roman Holiday	Won	
Academy Awards	1955	Best Costume Design – Black & White	Sabrina	Won	
Academy Awards	1956	Best Costume Design – Black & White	The Rose Tattoo	Nominated	
Academy Awards	1956	Best Costume Design – Color	To Catch a Thief	Nominated	
Academy Awards	1957	Best Costume Design – Black & White	The Proud and Profane	Nominated	
Academy Awards	1957	Best Costume Design – Color	The Ten Commandments	Nominated	
Academy Awards	1958	Best Costume Design	Funny Face	Nominated	
Academy Awards	1959	Best Costume Design	The Buccaneer	Nominated	
Academy Awards	1960	Best Costume Design – Black & White	Career	Nominated	
Academy Awards	1960	Best Costume Design – Color	The Five Pennies	Nominated	
Academy Awards	1961	Best Costume Design – Black & White	The Facts of Life	Won	
Academy Awards	1961	Best Costume Design – Color	Pepe	Nominated	
Academy Awards	1962	Best Costume Design – Color	Pocketful of Miracles	Nominated (Note: Shared with Walter Plunkett.)	
Academy Awards	1963	Costume Design – Black & White	The Man Who Shot Liberty Valance	Nominated	
Academy Awards	1963	Best Costume Design – Color	My Geisha	Nominated	
Academy Awards	1964	Best Costume Design – Black & White	Love with the Proper Stranger	Nominated	
Academy Awards	1964	Best Costume Design – Black & White	Wives and Lovers	Nominated	
Academy Awards	1964	Best Costume Design – Color	A New Kind of Love	Nominated	
Academy Awards	1965	Best Costume Design – Black & White	A House Is Not A Home	Nominated	
Academy Awards	1965	Best Costume Design – Color	What a Way to Go!	Nominated	
Academy Awards	1966	Best Costume Design – Black & White	The Slender Thread	Nominated	
Academy Awards	1966	Best Costume Design – Color	Inside Daisy Clover	Nominated	
Academy Awards	1967	Best Costume Design – Color	The Oscar	Nominated	
Academy Awards	1970	Best Costume Design	Sweet Charity	Nominated	
Academy Awards	1971	Best Costume Design	Airport	Nominated	
Academy Awards	1974	Best Costume Design	The Sting	Won	
Academy Awards	1976	Best Costume Design	The Man Who Would Be King	Nominated	
Academy Awards	1978	Best Costume Design	Airport '77	Nominated	
British Academy Film Awards	1976	Best Costume Design	The Man Who Would Be King	Nominated	
Costume Designers Guild Awards	1999	Hall of Fame	—N/a	Honored	

== Sources ==
- Alston, Isabella; Dixon, Kathryn (2014). Edith Head. Charlotte, North Carolina: TAJ Books International. ISBN 978-1-844-06389-5.
- Bauer, Laura L. S., ed. (2018). Hollywood Heroines: The Most Influential Women in Film History. Santa Barbara, California: Greenwood Publishing. ISBN 978-1-440-83649-7.
- Brackett, Charles (2014). "It's the Pictures That Got Small": Charles Brackett on Billy Wilder and Hollywood's Golden Age. New York City, New York: Columbia University Press. ISBN 978-0-231-53822-0.
- Commire, Anne Commire; Klezmer, Deborah Klezmer (2000). Women in World History: Harr-I. Waterford, Connecticut: Yorkin Publications. ISBN 978-0-7876-4066-8.
- Chierichetti, David (1976). Hollywood Costume Design. New York City, New York: Harmony Books. ISBN 978-0-517-52637-8.
- Chierichetti, David (2003). Edith Head: The Life and Times of Hollywood's Celebrated Costume Designer. New York City, New York: HarperCollins. ISBN 978-0-060-19428-4.
- Ellenberger, Allan R. (2001). Celebrities in Los Angeles Cemeteries: A Directory. Jefferson, North Carolina: McFarland & Company. ISBN 978-0-786-45019-0.
- Greven, David (2013). Psycho-Sexual: Male Desire in Hitchcock, De Palma, Scorsese, and Friedkin. Austin, Texas: University of Texas Press. ISBN 978-0-292-74202-4.
- Head, Edith (1983). Edith Head's Hollywood. New York City, New York: Dutton. ISBN 978-0-525-24200-0.
- Head, Edith; Ardmore, Jane Kesner (1959). The Dress Doctor. Boston, Massachusetts: Little, Brown. OCLC 978259.
- Head, Edith; Hyams, Joe (1967). How to Dress for Success. New York: Random House. LCCN 66012021.
- Maltin, Leonard (2003). Leonard Maltin's Movie and Video Guide 2004. New York City, New York: Penguin. ISBN 978-0-452-28478-4.
- Jorgensen, Jay (2010). Edith Head: The Fifty-Year Career of Hollywood's Greatest Costume Designer. Philadelphia, Pennsylvania: Running Press. ISBN 978-0-762-43805-1.
- Jorgensen, Jay; Scoggins, Donald L. (2015). Creating the Illusion: A Fashionable History of Hollywood Costume Designers. Philadelphia, Pennsylvania: Running Press. ISBN 978-0-762-45807-3.
- Kellogg, Ann T. (2002). In an Influential Fashion: An Encyclopedia of Nineteenth- and Twentieth-Century Fashion Designers and Retailers Who Transformed Dress. New York City, New York: Bloomsbury. ISBN 978-0-313-31220-5.
- Leese, Elizabeth (1991). Costume Design In the Movies: An Illustrated Guide to the Work of 157 Great Designers. New York City, New York: Dover Publications. ISBN 978-0-486-26548-3.
- Lim, Shirley Jennifer (2006). A Feeling of Belonging: Asian American Women's Public Culture, 1930-1960. New York City, New York: New York University Press. ISBN 978-0-814-75194-7.
- McDonagh, Fintan (2021). Edward Dmytryk: Reassessing His Films and Life. Jefferson, North Carolina: McFarland & Company. ISBN 978-1-476-64314-4.
- Maxford, Howard (2018). Hammer Complete: The Films, the Personnel, the Company. Jefferson, North Carolina: McFarland & Company. ISBN 978-1-476-62914-8.
- Naylor, Colin (1990). Contemporary Designers. Chicago, Illinois: St. James Press. ISBN 978-0-912-28969-4.
- Osborne, Robert (1999). 70 Years of the Oscar: The Official History of the Academy Awards. New York City, New York: Abbeville Press. ISBN 978-0-789-20484-4.
- Parish, James Robert (1994). Ghosts and Angels in Hollywood Films: Plots, Critiques, Casts, and Credits for 264 Theatrical and Made-for-Television Releases. Jefferson, North Carolina: McFarland & Company. ISBN 978-0-899-50676-0.
- Shelley, Peter (2010). Frances Farmer: The Life and Films of a Troubled Star. Jefferson, North Carolina: McFarland & Company. ISBN 978-0-7864-4745-9.
- Smith, Ella (1973). Starring Miss Barbara Stanwyck. New York City, New York: Crown Publishing Group. ISBN 978-0-517-50602-8.
- Steele, Valerie, ed. (2005). Encyclopedia of Clothing and Fashion. Vol. 2. Detroit, Michigan: Charles Scribner's Sons. ISBN 978-0-684-31396-2.
- Ware, Susan (2004). Notable American Women: A Biographical Dictionary Completing the Twentieth Century. Cambridge, Massachusetts: Belknap Press. ISBN 978-0-674-01488-6.
