= BAFTA Award for Best Production Design =

British film industry award

- Awarded for: Best Production Design
- Location: United Kingdom
- Presented by: British Academy of Film and Television Arts
- Currently held by: Tamara Deverell and Shane Vieau for Frankenstein (2025)
- Website: https://www.bafta.org/

Best Production Design is a British Academy Film Award presented annually by the British Academy of Film and Television Arts (BAFTA) to recognize a designer who has delivered outstanding production design in a film.

The British Academy of Film and Television Arts (BAFTA), is a British organisation that hosts annual awards shows for film, television, children's film and television, and interactive media. Since 1964, selected production designers (or art directors or set decorators) have been awarded with the BAFTA award for Best Production Design at an annual ceremony. The award was formerly known as Best Art Direction (1964–1975).

In the following lists, the titles and names in bold with a gold background are the winners and recipients respectively; those not in bold are the nominees. The years given are those in which the films under consideration were released, not the year of the ceremony, which always takes place the following year.

Stuart Craig has the most nominations with 16.

== Winners and nominees ==
indicates the winner

=== 1960s ===
Year	Film	Designer
**1964** (18th)	Best British Art Direction – Black and White	
**1964** (18th)	**Dr. Strangelove or: How I Learned to Stop Worrying and Love the Bomb**	**Ken Adam**
**1964** (18th)	Guns at Batasi	Maurice Carter
**1964** (18th)	King and Country	Richard Macdonald
**1964** (18th)	The Pumpkin Eater	Edward Marshall
**1964** (18th)	Best British Art Direction – Colour	
**1964** (18th)	**Becket**	**John Bryan**
**1964** (18th)	The Chalk Garden	Carmen Dillon
**1964** (18th)	Goldfinger	Ken Adam
**1964** (18th)	Zulu	Ernest Archer
**1965** (19th)	Best British Art Direction – Black and White	
**1965** (19th)	**Darling**	**Ray Simm**
**1965** (19th)	The Bedford Incident	Arthur Lawson
**1965** (19th)	The Hill	Herbert Smith
**1965** (19th)	Rotten to the Core	Alex Vetchinsky
**1965** (19th)	Best British Art Direction – Colour	
**1965** (19th)	**The Ipcress File**	**Ken Adam**
**1965** (19th)	Lord Jim	Geoffrey Drake
**1965** (19th)	Those Magnificent Men in Their Flying Machines	Thomas N. Morahan
**1965** (19th)	Thunderball	Ken Adam
**1966** (20th)	Best British Art Direction – Black and White	
**1966** (20th)	**The Spy Who Came In from the Cold**	**Tambi Larsen**
**1966** (20th)	Bunny Lake Is Missing	Donald M. Ashton
**1966** (20th)	Georgy Girl	Tony Woollard
**1966** (20th)	Life at the Top	Edward Marshall
**1966** (20th)	Best British Art Direction – Colour	
**1966** (20th)	**The Blue Max**	**Wilfred Shingleton**
**1966** (20th)	Khartoum	John Howell
**1966** (20th)	The Quiller Memorandum	Maurice Carter
**1966** (20th)	The Wrong Box	Ray Simm
**1967** (21st)	Best British Art Direction – Black and White	
**1967** (21st)	**Not awarded**	
**1967** (21st)	Best British Art Direction – Colour	
**1967** (21st)	**A Man for All Seasons**	**John Box**
**1967** (21st)	Accident	Carmen Dillon
**1967** (21st)	Blow-up	Assheton Gorton
**1967** (21st)	You Only Live Twice	Ken Adam
Best Art Direction
**1968** (22nd)	**2001: A Space Odyssey**	**Ernest Archer, Harry Lange and Anthony Masters**
**1968** (22nd)	The Charge of the Light Brigade	Edward Marshall
**1968** (22nd)	Oliver!	John Box
**1968** (22nd)	Romeo and Juliet	Renzo Mongiardino
**1969** (23rd)	**Oh! What a Lovely War**	**Donald M. Ashton**
**1969** (23rd)	Hello, Dolly!	John DeCuir
**1969** (23rd)	War and Peace	Mikhail Bogdanov and Gennady Myasnikov
**1969** (23rd)	Women in Love	Luciana Arrighi

=== 1970s ===
Year	Film	Designer
**1970** (24th)	**Waterloo**	**Mario Garbuglia**
**1970** (24th)	Anne of the Thousand Days	Maurice Carter
**1970** (24th)	Ryan's Daughter	Stephen B. Grimes
**1970** (24th)	Scrooge	Terence Marsh
**1971** (25th)	**Death in Venice**	**Ferdinando Scarfiotti**
**1971** (25th)	The Go-Between	Carmen Dillon
**1971** (25th)	Nicholas and Alexandra	John Box
**1971** (25th)	The Tales of Beatrix Potter	Christine Edzard
**1972** (26th)	**Cabaret**	**Rolf Zehetbauer**
**1972** (26th)	A Clockwork Orange	John Barry
**1972** (26th)	Lady Caroline Lamb	Carmen Dillon
**1972** (26th)	Young Winston	Donald M. Ashton and Geoffrey Drake
**1973** (27th)	**The Hireling**	**Natasha Kroll**
**1973** (27th)	England Made Me	Tony Woollard
**1973** (27th)	Roma	Danilo Donati
**1973** (27th)	Sleuth	Ken Adam
**1974** (28th)	**The Great Gatsby**	**John Box**
**1974** (28th)	Chinatown	Richard Sylbert
**1974** (28th)	Murder on the Orient Express	Tony Walton
**1974** (28th)	The Three Musketeers	Brian Eatwell
**1975** (29th)	**Rollerball**	**John Box**
**1975** (29th)	Barry Lyndon	Ken Adam
**1975** (29th)	The Day of the Locust	Richard Macdonald
**1975** (29th)	The Towering Inferno	William J. Creber
Best Production Design
**1976** (30th)	**Bugsy Malone**	**Geoffrey Kirkland**
**1976** (30th)	All the President's Men	George Jenkins
**1976** (30th)	King Kong	Mario Chiari and Dale Hennesy
**1976** (30th)	The Slipper and the Rose	Ray Simm
**1977** (31st)	**Fellini's Casanova**	**Danilo Donati and Federico Fellini**
**1977** (31st)	A Bridge Too Far	Terence Marsh
**1977** (31st)	The Spy Who Loved Me	Ken Adam
**1977** (31st)	Valentino	Philip Harrison
**1978** (32nd)	**Close Encounters of the Third Kind**	**Joe Alves**
**1978** (32nd)	Julia	Gene Callahan, Carmen Dillon and Willy Holt
**1978** (32nd)	Star Wars	John Barry
**1978** (32nd)	Superman	John Barry
**1979** (33rd)	**Alien**	**Michael Seymour**
**1979** (33rd)	Apocalypse Now	Dean Tavoularis
**1979** (33rd)	The Europeans	Jeremiah Rusconi
**1979** (33rd)	Yanks	Brian Morris

=== 1980s ===
Year	Film	Designer
**1980** (34th)	**The Elephant Man**	**Stuart Craig**
**1980** (34th)	All That Jazz	Philip Rosenberg
**1980** (34th)	The Empire Strikes Back	Norman Reynolds
**1980** (34th)	Flash Gordon	Danilo Donati
**1981** (35th)	**Raiders of the Lost Ark**	**Norman Reynolds**
**1981** (35th)	Chariots of Fire	Roger Hall
**1981** (35th)	The French Lieutenant's Woman	Assheton Gorton
**1981** (35th)	Tess	Pierre Guffroy
**1982** (36th)	**Blade Runner**	**Lawrence G. Paull**
**1982** (36th)	E.T. the Extra-Terrestrial	James D. Bissell
**1982** (36th)	Gandhi	Stuart Craig
**1982** (36th)	Reds	Richard Sylbert
**1983** (37th)	**La Traviata**	**Gianni Quaranta and Franco Zeffirelli**
**1983** (37th)	Heat and Dust	Wilfred Shingleton
**1983** (37th)	Return of the Jedi	Norman Reynolds
**1983** (37th)	WarGames	Angelo P. Graham
**1984** (38th)	**The Killing Fields**	**Roy Walker**
**1984** (38th)	1984	Allan Cameron
**1984** (38th)	The Company of Wolves	Anton Furst
**1984** (38th)	Greystoke: The Legend of Tarzan, Lord of the Apes	Stuart Craig
**1985** (39th)	**Brazil**	**Norman Garwood**
**1985** (39th)	Amadeus	Patrizia von Brandenstein
**1985** (39th)	Back to the Future	Lawrence G. Paull
**1985** (39th)	A Passage to India	John Box
**1986** (40th)	**A Room with a View**	**Brian Ackland-Snow and Gianni Quaranta**
**1986** (40th)	Aliens	Peter Lamont
**1986** (40th)	The Mission	Stuart Craig
**1986** (40th)	Ran	Shinobu and Yoshirō Muraki
**1987** (41st)	**Radio Days**	**Santo Loquasto**
**1987** (41st)	Hope and Glory	Anthony Pratt
**1987** (41st)	Jean de Florette	Bernard Vézat
**1987** (41st)	The Untouchables	William A. Elliott
**1988** (42nd)	**Tucker: The Man and His Dream**	**Dean Tavoularis**
**1988** (42nd)	Empire of the Sun	Norman Reynolds
**1988** (42nd)	The Last Emperor	Ferdinando Scarfiotti
**1988** (42nd)	Who Framed Roger Rabbit	Elliot Scott
**1989** (43rd)	**The Adventures of Baron Munchausen**	**Dante Ferretti**
**1989** (43rd)	Batman	Anton Furst
**1989** (43rd)	Dangerous Liaisons	Stuart Craig
**1989** (43rd)	Henry V	Tim Harvey

=== 1990s ===
Year	Film	Designer
**1990** (44th)	**Dick Tracy**	**Richard Sylbert**
**1990** (44th)	Cinema Paradiso	Andrea Crisanti
**1990** (44th)	The Hunt for Red October	Terence Marsh
**1990** (44th)	The Sheltering Sky	Gianni Silvestri
**1991** (45th)	**Edward Scissorhands**	**Bo Welch**
**1991** (45th)	The Addams Family	Richard Macdonald
**1991** (45th)	Cyrano de Bergerac	Ezio Frigerio
**1991** (45th)	Terminator 2: Judgment Day	Joseph C. Nemec III
**1992** (46th)	**Strictly Ballroom**	**Catherine Martin**
**1992** (46th)	Chaplin	Stuart Craig
**1992** (46th)	Howards End	Luciana Arrighi
**1992** (46th)	The Last of the Mohicans	Wolf Kroeger
**1993** (47th)	**The Piano**	**Andrew McAlpine**
**1993** (47th)	The Age of Innocence	Dante Ferretti
**1993** (47th)	Bram Stoker's Dracula	Thomas E. Sanders
**1993** (47th)	Schindler's List	Allan Starski
**1994** (48th)	**Interview with the Vampire**	**Dante Ferretti**
**1994** (48th)	The Adventures of Priscilla, Queen of the Desert	Colin Gibson and Owen Paterson
**1994** (48th)	Mary Shelley's Frankenstein	Tim Harvey
**1994** (48th)	The Mask	Craig Stearns
**1995** (49th)	**Apollo 13**	**Michael Corenblith**
**1995** (49th)	Braveheart	Thomas E. Sanders
**1995** (49th)	The Madness of King George	Ken Adam
**1995** (49th)	Sense and Sensibility	Luciana Arrighi
**1996** (50th)	**Richard III**	**Tony Burrough**
**1996** (50th)	The English Patient	Stuart Craig
**1996** (50th)	Evita	Brian Morris
**1996** (50th)	Hamlet	Tim Harvey
**1997** (51st)	**Romeo + Juliet**	**Catherine Martin**
**1997** (51st)	L.A. Confidential	Jeannine Oppewall
**1997** (51st)	Mrs Brown	Martin Childs
**1997** (51st)	Titanic	Peter Lamont
**1998** (52nd)	**The Truman Show**	**Dennis Gassner**
**1998** (52nd)	Elizabeth	John Myhre
**1998** (52nd)	Saving Private Ryan	Thomas E. Sanders
**1998** (52nd)	Shakespeare in Love	Martin Childs
**1999** (53rd)	**Sleepy Hollow**	**Rick Heinrichs**
**1999** (53rd)	American Beauty	Naomi Shohan
**1999** (53rd)	Angela's Ashes	Geoffrey Kirkland
**1999** (53rd)	The End of the Affair	Anthony Pratt
**1999** (53rd)	The Matrix	Owen Paterson

=== 2000s ===
Year	Film	Designer
**2000** (54th)	**Gladiator**	**Arthur Max**
**2000** (54th)	Chocolat	David Gropman
**2000** (54th)	Crouching Tiger, Hidden Dragon	Timmy Yip
**2000** (54th)	O Brother, Where Art Thou?	Dennis Gassner
**2000** (54th)	Quills	Martin Childs
**2001** (55th)	**Amélie**	**Aline Bonetto**
**2001** (55th)	Gosford Park	Stephen Altman
**2001** (55th)	Harry Potter and the Philosopher's Stone	Stuart Craig
**2001** (55th)	The Lord of the Rings: The Fellowship of the Ring	Grant Major
**2001** (55th)	Moulin Rouge!	Catherine Martin
**2002** (56th)	**Road to Perdition**	**Dennis Gassner**
**2002** (56th)	Chicago	John Myhre
**2002** (56th)	Gangs of New York	Dante Ferretti
**2002** (56th)	Harry Potter and the Chamber of Secrets	Stuart Craig
**2002** (56th)	The Lord of the Rings: The Two Towers	Grant Major
**2003** (57th)	**Master and Commander: The Far Side of the World**	**William Sandell**
**2003** (57th)	Big Fish	Dennis Gassner
**2003** (57th)	Cold Mountain	Dante Ferretti
**2003** (57th)	Girl with a Pearl Earring	Ben Van Os
**2003** (57th)	The Lord of the Rings: The Return of the King	Grant Major
**2004** (58th)	**The Aviator**	**Dante Ferretti**
**2004** (58th)	Finding Neverland	Gemma Jackson
**2004** (58th)	Harry Potter and the Prisoner of Azkaban	Stuart Craig
**2004** (58th)	House of Flying Daggers	Huo Tingxiao
**2004** (58th)	Vera Drake	Eve Stewart
**2005** (59th)	**Harry Potter and the Goblet of Fire**	**Stuart Craig**
**2005** (59th)	Batman Begins	Nathan Crowley
**2005** (59th)	Charlie and the Chocolate Factory	Alex McDowell
**2005** (59th)	King Kong	Grant Major
**2005** (59th)	Memoirs of a Geisha	John Myhre
**2006** (60th)	**Children of Men**	**Jim Clay, Geoffrey Kirkland and Jennifer Williams**
**2006** (60th)	Casino Royale	Peter Lamont, Lee Sandales and Simon Wakefield
**2006** (60th)	Marie Antoinette	K. K. Barrett and Véronique Melery
**2006** (60th)	Pan's Labyrinth	Eugenio Caballero and Pilar Revuelta
**2006** (60th)	Pirates of the Caribbean: Dead Man's Chest	Cheryl Carasik and Rick Heinrichs
**2007** (61st)	**Atonement**	**Sarah Greenwood and Katie Spencer**
**2007** (61st)	Elizabeth: The Golden Age	Guy Hendrix Dyas and Richard Roberts
**2007** (61st)	Harry Potter and the Order of the Phoenix	Stuart Craig and Stephenie McMillan
**2007** (61st)	La Vie en Rose	Olivier Raoux
**2007** (61st)	There Will Be Blood	Jim Erickson and Jack Fisk
**2008** (62nd)	**The Curious Case of Benjamin Button**	**Donald Graham Burt and Victor J. Zolfo**
**2008** (62nd)	Changeling	Gary Fettis and James J. Murakami
**2008** (62nd)	The Dark Knight	Nathan Crowley and Peter Lando
**2008** (62nd)	Revolutionary Road	Debra Schutt and Kristi Zea
**2008** (62nd)	Slumdog Millionaire	Michelle Day and Mark Digby
**2009** (63rd)	**Avatar**	**Rick Carter, Robert Stromberg and Kim Sinclair**
**2009** (63rd)	District 9	Philip Ivey and Guy Potgieter
**2009** (63rd)	Harry Potter and the Half-Blood Prince	Stuart Craig and Stephenie McMillan
**2009** (63rd)	The Imaginarium of Doctor Parnassus	Dave Warren, Anastasia Masaro and Caroline Smith
**2009** (63rd)	Inglourious Basterds	David Wasco and Sandy Reynolds Wasco

=== 2010s ===
Year	Film	Designer
**2010** (64th)	**Inception**	**Guy Hendrix Dyas, Larry Dias and Doug Mowat**
**2010** (64th)	Alice in Wonderland	Robert Stromberg and Karen O'Hara
**2010** (64th)	Black Swan	Thérèse DePrez and Tora Peterson
**2010** (64th)	The King's Speech	Eve Stewart and Judy Farr
**2010** (64th)	True Grit	Jess Gonchor and Nancy Haigh
**2011** (65th)	**Hugo**	**Dante Ferretti and Francesca Lo Schiavo**
**2011** (65th)	The Artist	Laurence Bennett and Robert Gould
**2011** (65th)	Harry Potter and the Deathly Hallows – Part 2	Stuart Craig and Stephenie McMillan
**2011** (65th)	Tinker Tailor Soldier Spy	Maria Djurkovic and Tatiana Macdonald
**2011** (65th)	War Horse	Rick Carter and Lee Sandales
**2012** (66th)	**Les Misérables**	**Eve Stewart and Anna Lynch-Robinson**
**2012** (66th)	Anna Karenina	Sarah Greenwood and Katie Spencer
**2012** (66th)	Life of Pi	David Gropman and Anna Pinnock
**2012** (66th)	Lincoln	Rick Carter and Jim Erickson
**2012** (66th)	Skyfall	Dennis Gassner and Anna Pinnock
**2013** (67th)	**The Great Gatsby**	**Catherine Martin and Beverly Dunn**
**2013** (67th)	12 Years a Slave	Adam Stockhausen and Alice Baker
**2013** (67th)	American Hustle	Judy Becker and Heather Loeffler
**2013** (67th)	Behind the Candelabra	Howard Cummings and Barbara Munch-Cameron
**2013** (67th)	Gravity	Andy Nicholson, Rosie Goodwin and Joanne Woollard
**2014** (68th)	**The Grand Budapest Hotel**	**Adam Stockhausen and Anna Pinnock**
**2014** (68th)	Big Eyes	Rick Heinrichs and Shane Vieau
**2014** (68th)	The Imitation Game	Maria Djurkovic and Tatiana Macdonald
**2014** (68th)	Interstellar	Nathan Crowley and Gary Fettis
**2014** (68th)	Mr. Turner	Suzie Davies and Charlotte Watts
**2015** (69th)	**Mad Max: Fury Road**	**Colin Gibson and Lisa Thompson**
**2015** (69th)	Bridge of Spies	Rena DeAngelo, Adam Stockhausen and Bernhard Henrich
**2015** (69th)	Carol	Judy Becker and Heather Loeffler
**2015** (69th)	The Martian	Celia Bobak and Arthur Max
**2015** (69th)	Star Wars: The Force Awakens	Rick Carter, Darren Gilford and Lee Sandales
**2016** (70th)	**Fantastic Beasts and Where to Find Them**	**Stuart Craig and Anna Pinnock**
**2016** (70th)	Doctor Strange	John Bush and Charles Wood
**2016** (70th)	Hail, Caesar!	Jess Gonchor and Nancy Haigh
**2016** (70th)	La La Land	David Wasco and Sandy Reynolds-Wasco
**2016** (70th)	Nocturnal Animals	Shane Valentino and Meg Everist
**2017** (71st)	**The Shape of Water**	**Paul Austerberry, Jeff Melvin and Shane Vieau**
**2017** (71st)	Beauty and the Beast	Sarah Greenwood and Katie Spencer
**2017** (71st)	Blade Runner 2049	Dennis Gassner and Alessandra Querzola
**2017** (71st)	Darkest Hour	Sarah Greenwood and Katie Spencer
**2017** (71st)	Dunkirk	Nathan Crowley and Gary Fettis
**2018** (72nd)	**The Favourite**	**Fiona Crombie and Alice Felton**
**2018** (72nd)	Fantastic Beasts: The Crimes of Grindelwald	Stuart Craig and Anna Pinnock
**2018** (72nd)	First Man	Nathan Crowley and Kathy Lucas
**2018** (72nd)	Mary Poppins Returns	John Myhre and Gordon Sim
**2018** (72nd)	Roma	Eugenio Caballero and Bárbara Enríquez
**2019** (73rd)	**1917**	**Dennis Gassner and Lee Sandales**
**2019** (73rd)	The Irishman	Bob Shaw and Regina Graves
**2019** (73rd)	Jojo Rabbit	Ra Vincent and Nora Sopková
**2019** (73rd)	Joker	Mark Friedberg and Kris Moran
**2019** (73rd)	Once Upon a Time in Hollywood	Barbara Ling and Nancy Haigh

=== 2020s ===
Year	Film	Designer
**2020** (74th)	**Mank**	**Donald Graham Burt and Jan Pascale**
**2020** (74th)	The Dig	Maria Djurkovic and Tatiana Macdonald
**2020** (74th)	The Father	Peter Francis and Cathy Featherstone
**2020** (74th)	News of the World	David Crank and Elizabeth Keenan
**2020** (74th)	Rebecca	Sarah Greenwood and Katie Spencer
**2021** (75th)	**Dune**	**Patrice Vermette and Zsuzsanna Sipos**
**2021** (75th)	Cyrano	Sarah Greenwood and Katie Spencer
**2021** (75th)	The French Dispatch	Adam Stockhausen and Rena DeAngelo
**2021** (75th)	Nightmare Alley	Tamara Deverell and Shane Vieau
**2021** (75th)	West Side Story	Adam Stockhausen and Rena DeAngelo
**2022** (76th)	**Babylon**	**Florencia Martin and Anthony Carlino**
**2022** (76th)	All Quiet on the Western Front	Christian M. Goldbeck and Ernestine Hipper
**2022** (76th)	The Batman	James Chinlund and Lee Sandales
**2022** (76th)	Elvis	Catherine Martin, Karen Murphy and Bev Dunn
**2022** (76th)	Guillermo del Toro's Pinocchio	Curt Enderle and Guy Davis
**2023** (77th)	**Poor Things**	**Shona Heath, James Price and Zsuzsa Mihalek**
**2023** (77th)	Barbie	Sarah Greenwood and Katie Spencer
**2023** (77th)	Killers of the Flower Moon	Jack Fisk and Adam Willis
**2023** (77th)	Oppenheimer	Ruth De Jong and Claire Kaufman
**2023** (77th)	The Zone of Interest	Chris Oddy, Joanna Maria Kuś and Katarzyna Sikora
**2024** (78th)	**Wicked**	**Nathan Crowley and Lee Sandales**
**2024** (78th)	The Brutalist	Judy Becker and Patricia Cuccia
**2024** (78th)	Conclave	Suzie Davies and Cynthia Sleiter
**2024** (78th)	Dune: Part Two	Patrice Vermette and Shane Vieau
**2024** (78th)	Nosferatu	Craig Lathrop and Beatrice Brentnerová
**2025** (79th)	**Frankenstein**	**Tamara Deverell and Shane Vieau**
**2025** (79th)	Hamnet	Fiona Crombie and Alice Felton
**2025** (79th)	Marty Supreme	Jack Fisk and Adam Willis
**2025** (79th)	One Battle After Another	Florencia Martin and Anthony Carlino
**2025** (79th)	Sinners	Hannah Beachler and Monique Champagne

== Multiple wins and nominations ==
=== Multiple nominations ===
16 nominations

- Stuart Craig

9 nominations

- Ken Adam

7 nominations

- Dante Ferretti
- Dennis Gassner
- Sarah Greenwood
- Katie Spencer

6 nominations

- John Box
- Nathan Crowley
- Lee Sandales

5 nominations

- Carmen Dillon
- Catherine Martin
- Anna Pinnock
- Adam Stockhausen
- Shane Vieau

4 nominations

- Rick Carter
- Grant Major
- John Myhre
- Norman Reynolds

3 nominations

- Luciana Arrighi
- Donald M. Ashton
- John Barry
- Judy Becker
- Maurice Carter
- Martin Childs
- Rena DeAngelo
- Maria Djurkovic
- Danilo Donati
- Gary Fettis
- Jack Fisk
- Nancy Haigh
- Tim Harvey
- Rick Heinrichs
- Geoffrey Kirkland
- Peter Lamont
- Richard Macdonald
- Tatiana Macdonald
- Terence Marsh
- Ted Marshall
- Stephenie McMillan
- Thomas E. Sanders
- Ray Simm
- Eve Stewart
- Richard Sylbert

2 nominations

- Ernest Archer
- Donald Graham Burt
- Eugenio Caballero
- Anthony Carlino
- Fiona Crombie
- Suzie Davies
- Tamara Deverell
- Geoffrey Drake
- Beverley Dunn
- Guy Hendrix Dyas
- Jim Erickson
- Alice Felton
- Anton Furst
- Colin Gibson
- Jess Gonchor
- Assheton Gorton
- David Gropman
- Heather Loeffler
- Florencia Martin
- Arthur Max
- Brian Morris
- Owen Paterson
- Lawrence G. Paull
- Anthony D. G. Pratt
- Gianni Quaranta
- Sandy Reynolds-Wasco
- Ferdinando Scarfiotti
- Wilfred Shingleton
- Robert Stromberg
- Dean Tavoularis
- Patrice Vermette
- David Wasco
- Adam Willis
- Tony Woollard

=== Multiple wins ===
4 wins

- Dante Ferretti

3 wins

- John Box
- Stuart Craig
- Dennis Gassner
- Catherine Martin

2 wins

- Ken Adam
- Donald Graham Burt
- Geoffrey Kirkland
- Anna Pinnock
- Gianni Quaranta
- Lee Sandales

== See also ==
- Academy Award for Best Production Design
- Art Directors Guild Award for Excellence in Production Design for a Contemporary Film
- Art Directors Guild Award for Excellence in Production Design for a Fantasy Film
- Art Directors Guild Award for Excellence in Production Design for a Period Film
- Critics' Choice Movie Award for Best Production Design
- Satellite Award for Best Art Direction and Production Design
- Saturn Award for Best Production Design
