= Satellite Award for Best Art Direction and Production Design =

Award from the International Press Academy

- Awarded for: Best Art Direction and Production Design
- Country: United States
- Presented by: International Press Academy
- First award: 1996
- Currently held by: Sarah Greenwood and Katie Spencer – Barbie (2023)
- Website: www.pressacademy.com

The Satellite Award for Best Art Direction and Production Design is one of the annual awards given by the International Press Academy.

== Winners and nominees ==
=== 1990s ===
Best Art Direction

Year	Film	Recipient(s)
1996	Romeo + Juliet	Catherine Martin
1996	The English Patient	Stuart Craig
1996	Evita	Brian Morris
1996	Hamlet	Tim Harvey
1996	The Portrait of a Lady	Janet Patterson
1997	Titanic	Peter Lamont
1997	Amistad	Rick Carter
1997	Gattaca	Jan Roelfs
1997	L.A. Confidential	Jeannine Oppewall
1997	The Wings of the Dove	John Beard
1998	The Truman Show	Dennis Gassner
1998	Beloved	Kristi Zea
1998	Elizabeth	John Myhre
1998	Pleasantville	Jeannine Oppewall
1998	Shakespeare in Love	Martin Childs
1999	Sleepy Hollow	Ken Court, John Dexter, Rick Heinrichs, Andy Nicholson, and Leslie Tomkins
1999	Anna and the King	Luciana Arrighi, Lek Chaiyan Chunsuttiwat, Paul Ghirardani, and John Ralph
1999	The Emperor and the Assassin (Jing Ke ci Qin Wang)	Weihua Ji and Juhua Tu
1999	An Ideal Husband	Michael Howells and Katie Lee
1999	The Legend of 1900 (La leggenda del pianista sull'oceano)	Bruno Cesari and Francesca Frigeri
1999	Titus	Dante Ferretti

=== 2000s ===
Year	Film	Recipient(s)
2000	The House of Mirth	Don Taylor
2000	Crouching Tiger, Hidden Dragon (Wo hu cang long)	Tim Yip
2000	Gladiator	Arthur Max and Keith Pain
2000	How the Grinch Stole Christmas	Michael Corenblith
2000	Traffic	Keith P. Cunningham and Philip Messina
2001	Moulin Rouge!	Catherine Martin and Ian Gracie
2001	Gosford Park	Stephen Altman and Anna Pinnock
2001	Harry Potter and the Sorcerer's Stone	Stuart Craig
2001	The Lord of the Rings: The Fellowship of the Ring	Dan Hennah and Grant Major
2001	The Others	Emilio Ardura, Benjamín Fernández, and Elli Griff
2002	Gangs of New York	Dante Ferretti
2002	Catch Me If You Can	Sarah Knowles
2002	CQ	Luc Chalon and Oshin Yeghiazariantz
2002	Frida	Felipe Fernández del Paso and Hania Robledo
2002	Road to Perdition	Dennis Gassner and Richard L. Johnson

Best Art Direction and Production Design

Year	Film	Recipient(s)
2003	The Lord of the Rings: The Return of the King	Dan Hennah, Alan Lee, and Grant Major
2003	Kill Bill: Volume 1	Yohei Taneda, David Wasco, and Sandy Reynolds-Wasco
2003	The Last Samurai	Lilly Kilvert and Gretchen Rau
2003	Master and Commander: The Far Side of the World	Robert Gould and William Sandell
2003	Seabiscuit	Jeannine Oppewall and Leslie Pope
2003	Whale Rider	Grant Major and Grace Mok
2004	De-Lovely	John Bush, John Hill, and Eve Stewart
2004	The Aviator	Dante Ferretti and Francesca Lo Schiavo
2004	House of Flying Daggers (Shi mian mai fu)	Zhong Han
2004	The Phantom of the Opera	Celia Bobak and Anthony D. G. Pratt
2004	Sky Captain and the World of Tomorrow	Pier Luigi Basile, Kevin Conran, and Kirsten Conran
2004	Vanity Fair	Maria Djurkovic and Tatiana MacDonald
2005	Good Night, and Good Luck	James D. Bissell
2005	Kingdom of Heaven	Arthur Max
2005	Memoirs of a Geisha	John Myhre
2005	Modigliani	Luigi Marchione and Vlad Vieru
2005	Sin City	David Hack and Jeanette Scott
2005	Star Wars: Episode III – Revenge of the Sith	Gavin Bocquet and Richard Roberts
2006	Flags of Our Fathers	Henry Bumstead, Richard C. Goddard, and Jack G. Taylor Jr.
2006	Dreamgirls	Nancy Haigh, John Myhre, and Tomas Voth
2006	Marie Antoinette	K. K. Barrett
2006	Pan's Labyrinth (El laberinto del fauno)	Eugenio Caballero
2006	V for Vendetta	Stephan O. Gessler, Sarah Horton, Sebastian T. Krawinkel, Owen Paterson, and Marco Bittner Rosser
2007	Elizabeth: The Golden Age	David Allday and Guy Hendrix Dyas
2007	Across the Universe	Mark Friedberg and Peter Rogness
2007	Amazing Grace	David Allday, Matthew Gray, and Charles Wood
2007	The Assassination of Jesse James by the Coward Robert Ford	Martin Gendron, Patricia Norris, and Troy Sizemore
2007	Hairspray	Dennis Davenport and David Gropman
2007	Sunshine	Gary Freeman, Stephen Morahan, Denis Schnegg, and Mark Tildesley
2008	Australia	Catherine Martin, Ian Gracie, Karen Murphy, and Beverly Dunn
2008	Brideshead Revisited	Thomas Brown, Lynne Huitson, Ben Munro, and Alice Normington
2008	City of Ember	Jon Billington, Ross Bradshaw, James Foster, Ashleigh Jeffers, and Martin Laing
2008	The Curious Case of Benjamin Button	Donald Graham Burt and Tom Reta
2008	The Duchess	Michael Carlin and Karen Wakefield
2008	Revolutionary Road	Teresa Carriker-Thayer, John Kasarda, Nicholas Lundy, and Kristi Zea
2009	A Single Man	Dan Bishop and Ian Phillips
2009	2012	Barry Chusid and Elizabeth Wilcox
2009	The Imaginarium of Doctor Parnassus	Terry Gilliam, Anastasia Masaro, and Dave Warren
2009	Public Enemies	Nathan Crowley, Patrick Lumb, and William Ladd Skinner
2009	Red Cliff (Chi bi)	Eddy Wong and Tim Yip
2009	The Road	Chris Kennedy

=== 2010s ===
Year	Film	Recipient(s)
2010	Inception	Guy Hendrix Dyas, Luke Freeborn, Brad Ricker, and Dean Wolcott
2010	Alice in Wonderland	Stefan Dechant and Robert Stromberg
2010	Black Swan	Thérèse DePrez and David Stein
2010	Coco Chanel & Igor Stravinsky	Philippe Cord'homme, Kathy Lebrun, and Marie-Hélène Sulmoni
2010	I Am Love (Io sono l'amore)	Francesca Di Mottola
2010	Scott Pilgrim vs. the World	Nigel Churcher and Marcus Rowland
2010	Shutter Island	Max Biscoe, Dante Ferretti, Robert Guerra, and Christina Ann Wilson
2011	The Artist	Laurence Bennett and Gregory S. Hooper
2011	Anonymous	Stephan O. Gessler and Sebastian T. Krawinkel
2011	Faust	Jiri Trier and Yelena Zhukova
2011	Hugo	Dante Ferretti and Francesca Lo Schiavo
2011	Mysteries of Lisbon	Isabel Branco
2011	Water for Elephants	Jack Fisk
2012	Lincoln	Curt Beech, Rick Carter, David Crank, and Leslie McDonald
2012	Anna Karenina	Thomas Brown, Nick Gottschalk, Sarah Greenwood, Niall Moroney, and Tom Still
2012	The Dark Knight Rises	Nathan Crowley, James Hambidge, Kevin Kavanaugh, and Naaman Marshall
2012	Les Misérables	Anna Lynch-Robinson and Eve Stewart
2012	The Master	David Crank and Jack Fisk
2012	A Royal Affair (En kongelig affære)	Niels Sejer
2013	The Great Gatsby	Catherine Martin and Beverly Dunn
2013	The Butler	Tim Galvin and Diane Lederman
2013	The Invisible Woman	Maria Djurkovic and Tatiana MacDonald
2013	Oz the Great and Powerful	Nancy Haigh and Robert Stromberg
2013	Rush	Mark Digby and Patrick Rolfe
2013	Saving Mr. Banks	Michael Corenblith and Lauren E. Polizzi
2014	The Grand Budapest Hotel	Stephan O. Gessler, Anna Pinnock, and Adam Stockhausen
2014	Birdman	Stephen H. Carter, George DeTitta Jr., and Kevin Thompson
2014	Fury	Andrew Menzies and Peter Russell
2014	The Imitation Game	Nick Dent and Maria Djurkovic
2014	Maleficent	Dylan Cole, Gary Freeman, and Frank Walsh
2014	Noah	Mark Friedberg and Debra Schutt
2015	Bridge of Spies	Adam Stockhausen
2015	Cinderella	Dante Ferretti
2015	The Danish Girl	Eve Stewart
2015	Macbeth	Fiona Crombie
2015	Mad Max: Fury Road	Colin Gibson
2015	Spectre	Dennis Gassner
2016	La La Land	David Wasco
2016	Alice Through the Looking Glass	Dan Hennah
2016	Allied	Gary Freeman
2016	Hacksaw Ridge	Barry Robison
2016	Jackie	Jean Rabasse
2016	The Jungle Book	Christopher Glass
2017	The Shape of Water	Paul Denham Austerberry
2017	Blade Runner 2049	Dennis Gassner
2017	Downsizing	Stefania Cella
2017	Dunkirk	Nathan Crowley
2017	Get Out	Rusty Smith
2017	Phantom Thread	Mark Tildesley
2018	Mary Poppins Returns	John Myhre
2018	Black Panther	Hannah Beachler
2018	Fantastic Beasts: The Crimes of Grindelwald	Stuart Craig
2018	The Favourite	Fiona Crombie
2018	First Man	Nathan Crowley
2018	Roma	Eugenio Caballero
2019	Motherless Brooklyn	Michael Ahern and Beth Mickle
2019	1917	Dennis Gassner and Lee Sandales
2019	Ford v Ferrari	François Audouy and Peter Lando
2019	Joker	Laura Ballinger and Mark Friedberg
2019	Once Upon a Time in Hollywood	Nancy Haigh and Barbara Ling
2019	The Two Popes	Saverio Sammali and Mark Tildesley

=== 2020s ===
Year	Film	Recipient(s)
2020	Mank	Donald Graham Burt, Chris Craine, Jan Pascale, and Dan Webster
2020	The Midnight Sky	James D. Bissell and John Bush
2020	Mulan	Anne Kuljian and Grant Major
2020	One Night in Miami...	Page Buckner, Barry Robinson, and Mark Zuelzke
2020	The Personal History of David Copperfield	Cristina Casali and Charlotte Dirickx
2020	The Prom	Jamie Walker McCall and Gene Serdena
2021	The Tragedy of Macbeth	Stefan Dechant
2021	Belfast	Jim Clay and Claire Nia Richards
2021	Dune	Richard Roberts, Zsuzsanna Sipos, and Patrice Vermette
2021	The French Dispatch	Rena DeAngelo and Adam Stockhausen
2021	The Power of the Dog	Grant Major and Amber Richards
2021	Spencer	Guy Hendrix Dyas and Yesim Zolan

Best Production Design

Year	Film	Recipient(s)
2022	Babylon	Florencia Martin and Anthony Carlino
2022	Avatar: The Way of Water	Dylan Cole and Ben Procter
2022	Elvis	Catherine Martin and Karen Murphy
2022	The Fabelmans	Rick Carter
2022	A Love Song	Juliana Barreto Barreto
2022	RRR	Sabu Cyril
2023	Barbie	Sarah Greenwood and Katie Spencer
2023	Ferrari	Maria Djurkovic and Sophie Phillips
2023	Killers of the Flower Moon	Jack Fisk and Adam Willis
2023	Maestro	Kevin Thompson and Rena DeAngelo
2023	Napoleon	Arthur Max
2023	Oppenheimer	Ruth De Jong and Claire Kaufman
