= 18th British Academy Film Awards =

1965 film awards ceremony

- Date: 1965

Highlights
- Best Film: Dr. Strangelove or: How I Learned to Stop Worrying and Love the Bomb
- Best British Film: Dr. Strangelove or: How I Learned to Stop Worrying and Love the Bomb
- Most awards: Dr. Strangelove or: How I Learned to Stop Worrying and Love the Bomb & The Pumpkin Eater (4)
- Most nominations: Becket, Dr. Strangelove or: How I Learned to Stop Worrying and Love the Bomb, and The Pumpkin Eater (7)

The 18th British Academy Film Awards, given by the British Academy of Film and Television Arts in 1965, honoured the best films of 1964.

== Winners and nominees ==
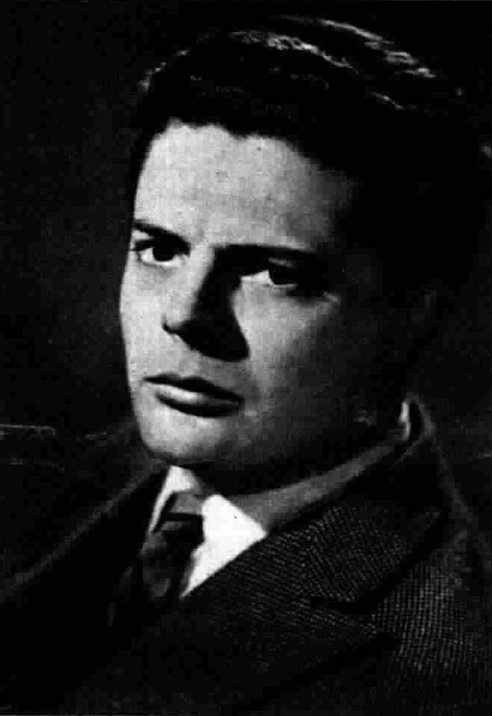
Marcello Mastroianni, Best Foreign Actor winner

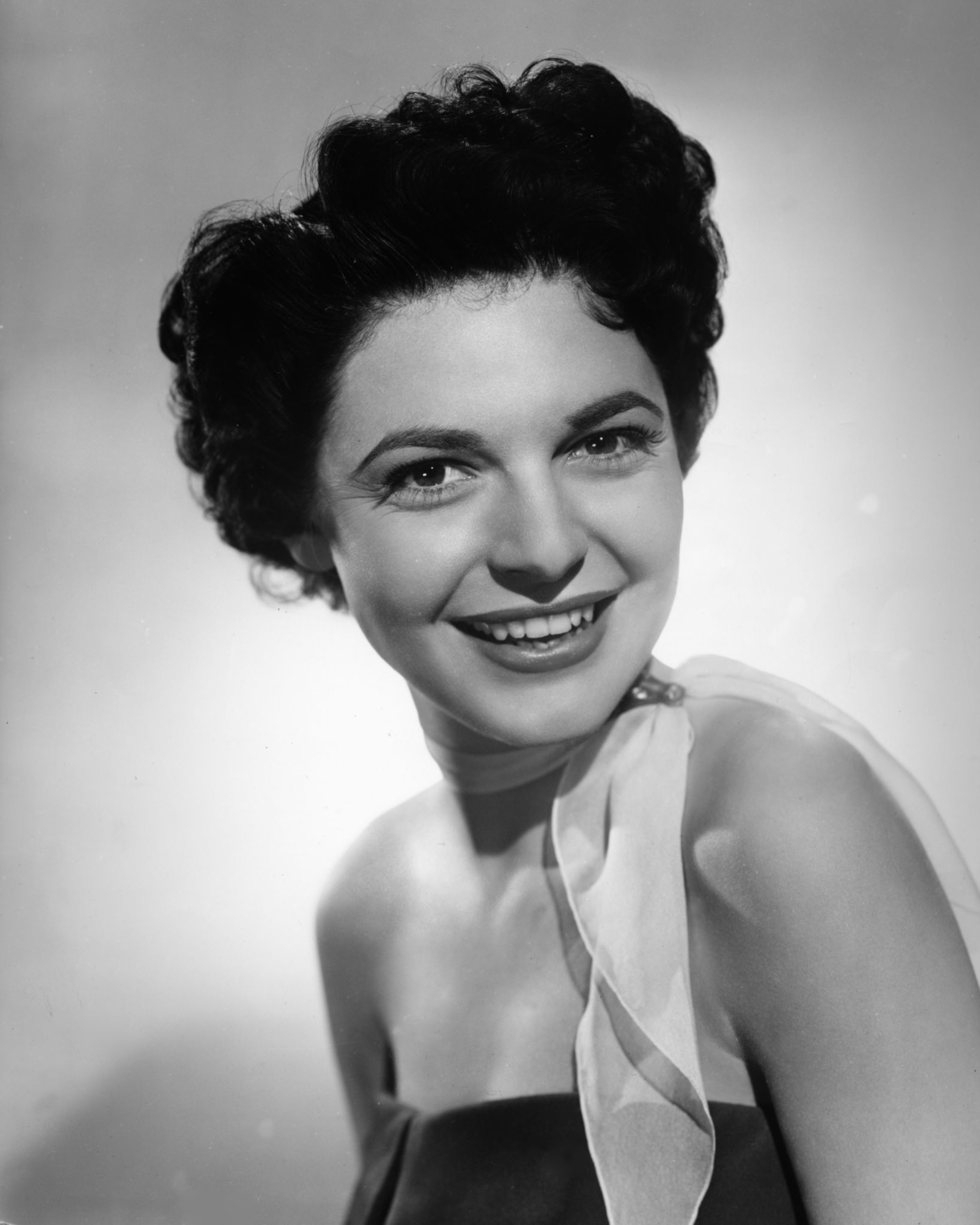
Anne Bancroft, Best Foreign Actress winner

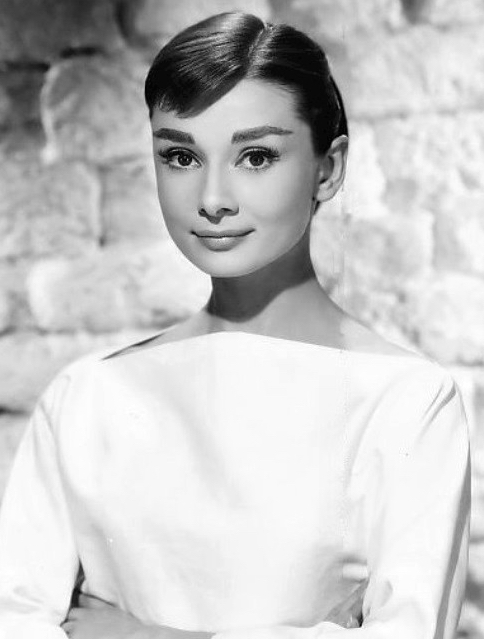
Audrey Hepburn, Best British Actress winner

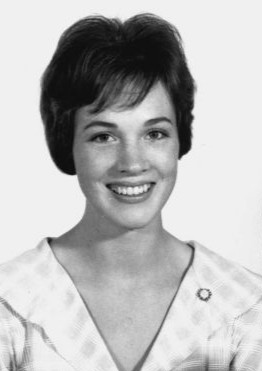
Julie Andrews, Best Newcomer winner

Best Film Dr. Strangelove – Stanley Kubrick: Becket – Peter Glenville; The Pumpkin Eater – Jack Clayton; The Train – John Frankenheimer
Best Animated Film The Insects - Jimmy T. Murakami	Best Documentary Nobody Waved Good-bye: The Human Dutch; The Life of Billy Walker; Portrait of Queenie
Best Short Film Eskimo Artist: Kenojuak: 23 Skidoo; Mekong; Muloorina	Best Specialised Film Driving Technique Passenger Trains: And Glaadly Would He Learn; The Circarc Gear; Germany: A Regional Geography
Best Foreign Actor Marcello Mastroianni – Yesterday, Today and Tomorrow as Carmine Sbaratti/Renzo/Augusto Rusconti: Cary Grant – Charade as Peter Joshua; Sidney Poitier – Lilies of the Field as Homer Smith; Sterling Hayden – Dr. Strangelove as Brigadier General Jack Ripper	Best Foreign Actress Anne Bancroft – The Pumpkin Eater as Jo Armitage: Ava Gardner – The Night of the Iguana as Maxine Faulk; Kim Stanley – Séance on a Wet Afternoon as Myra Savage; Shirley MacLaine – Irma la Douce as Irma la Douce; Shirley MacLaine – What a Way to Go! as Louisa May Foster
Best British Actor Richard Attenborough – Guns at Batasi as Regimental Sergeant Major Lauderdale; Richard Attenborough – Séance on a Wet Afternoon as Billy Savage: Peter O'Toole – Becket as Henry II; Peter Sellers – Dr. Strangelove as Group Captain Lionel Mandrake/President Merkin Muffley/Doctor Strangelove; Peter Sellers – The Pink Panther as Inspector Clouseau; Tom Courtenay – King and Country as Private Arthur Hamp	Best British Actress Audrey Hepburn – Charade as Regina Lampert: Deborah Kerr – The Chalk Garden as Miss Madrigal; Edith Evans – The Chalk Garden as Mrs. St. Maugham; Rita Tushingham – Girl with Green Eyes as Kate Brady
Best British Film Dr. Strangelove – Stanley Kubrick: Becket – Peter Glenville; King and Country – Joseph Losey; The Pumpkin Eater – Jack Clayton	Best British Screenplay The Pumpkin Eater – Harold Pinter: Becket – Edward Anhalt; Dr. Strangelove – Stanley Kubrick, Peter George and Terry Southern; Séance on a Wet Afternoon – Bryan Forbes
Best Production Design, Black and White Dr. Strangelove – Ken Adam: Guns at Batasi – Maurice Carter; King and Country – Richard Macdonald; The Pumpkin Eater – Ted Marshall	Best Production Design, Colour Becket – John Bryan: The Chalk Garden – Carmen Dillon; Goldfinger – Ken Adam; Zulu – Ernest Archer
Best Cinematography, Black and White The Pumpkin Eater – Oswald Morris: Guns at Batasi – Douglas Slocombe; King and Country – Denys Coop; Séance on a Wet Afternoon – Gerry Turpin	Best Cinematography, Colour Becket – Geoffrey Unsworth: The 7th Dawn – Freddie Young; The Chalk Garden – Arthur Ibbetson; Nothing but the Best – Nicolas Roeg; The Yellow Rolls-Royce – Jack Hildyard
Best Costume Design, Black and White The Pumpkin Eater – Motley Theatre Design Group: Of Human Bondage – Beatrice Dawson; Psyche 59 – Julie Harris	Best Costume Design, Colour Becket – Margaret Furse: The Long Ships – Anthony Mendleson; Woman of Straw – Beatrice Dawson; The Yellow Rolls-Royce – Anthony Mendleson
Most Promising Newcomer to Leading Film Roles Julie Andrews – Mary Poppins as Mary Poppins: The Beatles – A Hard Day's Night as Themselves; Elizabeth Ashley – The Carpetbaggers as Monica Winthroop; Lynn Redgrave – Girl with Green Eyes as Baba Brennan	United Nations Award Dr. Strangelove: 23 Skidoo; A Distant Trumpet; Lilies of the Field

== Statistics ==
Films that received multiple nominations
Nominations	Film
7	Becket
7	Dr. Strangelove
7	The Pumpkin Eater
4	The Chalk Garden
4	King and Country
4	Séance on a Wet Afternoon
3	Guns at Batasi
2	23 Skidoo
2	Charade
2	Girl with Green Eyes
2	Lilies of the Field
2	The Yellow Rolls-Royce

Films that received multiple awards
Awards	Film
4	Dr. Strangelove
4	The Pumpkin Eater
3	Becket
