= Art Directors Guild Awards 2011 =

Annual US film and television awards ceremony

16th Art Directors Guild Awards
- Date: February 4, 2012

The 16th Art Directors Guild Awards, which were given on February 4, 2012, honored the best production designers of 2011.

== Winners and nominees ==
=== Film ===
Period Film:

- Dante Ferretti – Hugo
  - Sebastian Krawinkel – Anonymous
  - Laurence Bennett – The Artist
  - Mark Ricker – The Help
  - Maria Djurkovic – Tinker Tailor Soldier Spy

Fantasy Film:

- Stuart Craig – Harry Potter and the Deathly Hallows – Part 2
  - Robert Stromberg – The Adventures of Tintin: The Secret of the Unicorn
  - Rick Heinrichs – Captain America: The First Avenger
  - Scott Chambliss – Cowboys & Aliens
  - John Myhre – Pirates of the Caribbean: On Stranger Tides

Contemporary Film:

- Donald Graham Burt – The Girl with the Dragon Tattoo
  - Jefferson Sage – Bridesmaids
  - Jane Ann Stewart – The Descendants
  - Beth Mickle – Drive
  - K. K. Barrett – Extremely Loud and Incredibly Close

=== Television ===
One-Hour Single Camera Television Series:

- Bill Groom – Boardwalk Empire (for "21")
  - Gemma Jackson – Game of Thrones (for "A Golden Crown")
  - Mark Worthington – American Horror Story: Murder House (for "Murder House")
  - Scott P. Murphy – The Playboy Club (for "The Scarlet Bunny")
  - Bob Shaw – Pan Am (for "Pilot")

Episode of a Half Hour Single-Camera Television Series

- Richard Berg – Modern Family (for "Express Christmas")
  - Keith Raywood and Teresa Mastropierro – 30 Rock (for "Double-Edged Sword")
  - Joseph P. Lucky – Weeds (for "Game-Played")
  - Michael Wylie – Californication (for "Monkey Business")
  - Jefferson Sage – New Girl (for "Pilot")

Multi-Camera Unscripted Series:

- Keith Raywood, Eugene Lee, Akira Yoshimura & N. Joseph DeTullio – Saturday Night Live (for "Host: Justin Timberlake/Lady Gaga")
  - Stephan G. Olson – How I Met Your Mother (for "Ducky Tie")
  - Glenda Rovello – 2 Broke Girls (for "And the Rich People Problems")
  - James Yarnell – American Idol (for "Top 12 Boys Perform")
  - James Yarnell – Dancing with the Stars (for "Round One")

Miniseries or Television Movie:

- Mark Friedberg – Mildred Pierce
  - Patti Podesta – Cinema Verite
  - Bob Shaw – Too Big to Fail
  - Eve Stewart – The Hour
  - Robb Wilson King – Bling Ring
