= Becket (1964 film) =

1964 film by Peter Glenville

- Original film poster by Sanford Kossin
- Directed by: Peter Glenville
- Written by: Edward Anhalt
- Based on: Becket by Jean Anouilh
- Produced by: Hal B. Wallis
- Starring: Richard Burton; Peter O'Toole; John Gielgud
- Cinematography: Geoffrey Unsworth
- Edited by: Anne V. Coates
- Music by: Laurence Rosenthal
- Production company: Hal Wallis Productions
- Distributed by: Paramount Pictures
- Release date: 11 March 1964
- Running time: 148 minutes
- Countries: United Kingdom; United States
- Language: English
- Budget: $3 million
- Box office: $9.1 million

Becket is a 1964 historical drama film about the historic, tumultuous relationship between Henry II of England and his friend-turned-bishop Thomas Becket. It is a dramatic film adaptation of the 1959 play Becket or the Honour of God by Jean Anouilh made by Hal Wallis Productions and released by Paramount Pictures. It was directed by Peter Glenville and produced by Hal B. Wallis with Joseph H. Hazen as executive producer. The screenplay was written by Edward Anhalt based on Anouilh's play. The music score was by Laurence Rosenthal, the cinematography by Geoffrey Unsworth and the editing by Anne V. Coates.

The film stars Richard Burton as Thomas Becket and Peter O'Toole as King Henry II, with John Gielgud as King Louis VII, Donald Wolfit as Gilbert Foliot, Paolo Stoppa as Pope Alexander III, Martita Hunt as Empress Matilda, Pamela Brown as Queen Eleanor, Siân Phillips, Felix Aylmer, Gino Cervi, David Weston and Wilfrid Lawson.

Restored prints of Becket were re-released in 30 cinemas in the US in early 2007, following an extensive restoration from the film's YCM separation masters. The film was released on DVD by MPI Home Video in May 2007 and on Blu-ray Disc in November 2008. The new film prints carry a Dolby Digital soundtrack, although the soundtrack of the original film, which originally opened as a roadshow theatrical release, was also in stereo.

Becket won the Academy Award for Best Adapted Screenplay, and was nominated for eleven other awards, including for Best Picture, Best Director, Best Supporting Actor, and twice for Best Actor.

== Plot ==
Thomas Becket is an advisor and companion of the carousing King Henry II. Henry appoints Becket as Lord Chancellor to have a close confidant in this position whom he can completely control. Henry is less interested in his royal duties than drunken forays in the royal hunting grounds and pursuing peasant women. He becomes increasingly dependent on Becket, a Saxon commoner, who arranges these debaucheries when he is not busy running Henry's court. This foments great resentment on the part of Henry's Norman noblemen, who distrust and envy this Saxon upstart, as well as Henry's wife Queen Eleanor and Henry's mother Empress Matilda, who see Becket as an unnatural and unseemly influence upon the King.

Henry finds himself in continuous conflict with the elderly Archbishop of Canterbury, who opposes the taxation of Church property to support Henry's military campaigns in France. During one of his campaigns in coastal France, he receives news that the archbishop has died. In a burst of inspiration, Henry exercises his prerogative to pick the next Archbishop, and informs an astonished Becket that he is the royal choice.

Shortly thereafter, Becket sides with the Church, throwing Henry into a fury. One of the main bones of contention is Thomas' excommunication of Lord Gilbert, one of Henry's most loyal stalwarts, for seizing and ordering the killing of a priest who had been accused of sexual indiscretions with a young girl, before the priest can even be handed over for ecclesiastical trial. Gilbert then refused to acknowledge his transgressions and seek absolution.

The King has a dramatic secret meeting with the Bishop of London in his cathedral. He lays out his plan to remove Becket through scandal and innuendo, which the envious Bishop of London quickly agrees to. These attempts fall flat when Becket, in full ecclesiastic garb, confronts his accusers and announces that as Archbishop he will petition the Pope for an ecclesiastical trial, causing Henry to laugh and bitterly note the irony of having his friend turn into his enemy.

Becket escapes to France where he encounters the conniving yet sympathetic King Louis. King Louis sees in Becket a means by which he can further his favourite pastime, tormenting the English. Louis provides refuge for Becket at the Abbey of Saint Martin while the English send emissaries to retrieve Becket.

Becket then travels to the Vatican, where he begs the Pope to allow him to renounce his position and retire to a monastery as an ordinary priest. The Pope reminds Becket that he has an obligation as a matter of principle to return to England and take a stand against civil interference in Church matters. Becket yields to this decision and asks Louis to arrange a meeting with Henry on the beaches at Normandy. Henry asks Becket whether or not he loved him and Becket replied that he loved Henry to the best of his ability. A shaky truce is declared and Becket is allowed to return to England.

Henry then rapidly sinks into drunken fixation over Becket and his perceived betrayal. The barons worsen his mood by pointing out that Becket has become a folk hero among the vanquished Saxons, who are ever restive and resentful of their Norman conquerors. During a drunken rage, Henry asks "Will no one rid me of this meddlesome priest?" His faithful barons hear this and proceed quickly to Canterbury, where they put Thomas and his Saxon deputy, Brother John, to the sword. A badly shaken Henry then undergoes a penance by whipping at the hands of Saxon monks.

Henry, fresh from his whipping, informs the barons that the ones who killed Becket will be found and justly punished. He then publicly proclaims to the crowd outside the church his arrangement for Thomas Becket to be canonised as a saint.

== Cast ==
- Richard Burton – Thomas Becket, Archbishop of Canterbury
- Peter O'Toole – King Henry II of England
- John Gielgud – King Louis VII of France
- Paolo Stoppa (voice: Robert Rietti) – Pope Alexander III
- Donald Wolfit – Gilbert Foliot, Bishop of London
- David Weston – Brother John
- Martita Hunt – Empress Matilda, Henry II's mother
- Pamela Brown – Eleanor of Aquitaine, wife of Henry II
- Siân Phillips – Gwendolen – Becket's lover & a Welsh noblewoman who is a captive of Henry II
- Felix Aylmer – Theobald of Bec, Archbishop of Canterbury
- Gino Cervi – Cardinal Zambelli
- Percy Herbert – Baron
- Niall MacGinnis – Baron
- Christopher Rhodes – Baron
- Peter Jeffrey – Baron
- Inigo Jackson – Robert de Beaumont
- John Phillips – Bishop of Winchester
- Frank Pettingell – Bishop of York
- Hamilton Dyce – Bishop of Chichester
- Jennifer Hilary – Peasant's daughter
- Véronique Vendell – Marie, a French peasant girl that Henry has a tryst with
- Graham Stark – The Pope's Secretary
- Jack Taylor – a villager
- Victor Spinetti – French tailor
- Edward Woodward – Clement

== Background and production ==
The screenplay was written by American screenwriter Edward Anhalt, based on the French play Becket ou l'honneur de Dieu by Jean Anouilh. The film was produced by American film producer Hal B. Wallis through his independent company Hal Wallis Productions. It was financed and distributed by Paramount Pictures and was made at Shepperton Studios, England, and on location at Alnwick Castle, Bamburgh Castle and Bamburgh Beach in Northumberland.

Peter O'Toole went on to play King Henry II once more in The Lion in Winter (1968).

Siân Phillips, who plays Gwendolen, was Peter O'Toole's wife at the time of filming.

Anne V. Coates, editor, called it "probably the most beautiful, or the script, that I’ve ever worked on actually. I mean, it’s a film that you could see time and time again and enjoy every line of dialogue. I just thought it was, in that way, a most superior kind of script of its kind."

== Historicity ==
Most of the historical inaccuracies in the film are from the play, as Anouilh was writing drama rather than a history, and he took dramatic licence.

The major inaccuracy is the depiction of Becket as a Saxon who has risen to a perceived Norman social standing, when in fact the historical Thomas Becket was a Norman (while Henry was an Angevin, though his mother was from the House of Normandy). Anouilh did this because he had based the play on a 19th-century account that described Becket as a Saxon. He had been informed of this error before his play was produced, but decided against correcting it because it would undermine a key point of conflict, and because "history might eventually rediscover that Becket was a Saxon, after all."

Becket is depicted as Henry's loyal "drinking pal", who assists him with illicit romantic entanglements and drunken hunting exercises, but who becomes saintly and responsible after his appointment as Archbishop. Passing mention is made in the film of the Constitutions of Clarendon (simply as the "Sixteen Articles"); the struggle between Becket and Henry is boiled down to their conflict over Lord Gilbert's murder of the captive priest. In no way is Becket depicted as a man who desired special legal privileges (defrocking rather than prison) for his clergy, as some believe.

Henry's mother, Empress Matilda, died in 1167, three years before the treaty of Fréteval allowed Becket to return in England. Henry appears to not have any respect for his mother and treats her as something of an annoyance, a rather drastic departure from what is generally held as historical fact. Empress Matilda was Henry's sole parent for much of his childhood, and she was instrumental in shaping Henry into the fierce warrior and skilled administrator he was. Far from seeing his mother as a burden, Henry seems to have adored Matilda and relied heavily on her advice and guidance until her death. Finally, at one point in the movie, Matilda complains that her gender was a major limiting factor in her life when in fact when she was an active military leader against Stephen of Blois during The Anarchy.

Henry's wife, Eleanor of Aquitaine, was in fact beautiful, and highly educated. She was known to have an amicable marriage with Henry despite his mistresses and frequent absences. She is shown publicly rebuking Henry in a scene near the end of the film, when in fact Eleanor, whatever private reservations she may have had, is not known to have ever behaved in such a manner in public. During the same scene, she says she will go to her father to complain of Henry's treatment of her; however, her father William X, Duke of Aquitaine had died decades before, when Eleanor was just 15 years old.

Also, the film only shows four sons of Henry and Eleanor. In actuality, Henry and Eleanor had eight children, five sons and three daughters. While the eldest son, William, had died before the events of the film, the three daughters are neglected.

== Production financing ==
The film grossed $9,164,370 at the box office, earning $3 million in rentals.

== Reception ==
On review aggregator Rotten Tomatoes, 76% of 29 critics gave the film a positive review, with an average rating of 7.2/10.

== Awards and nominations ==
Award	Category	Nominee(s)	Result
Academy Awards	Best Picture	Hal B. Wallis	Nominated
Academy Awards	Best Director	Peter Glenville	Nominated
Academy Awards	Best Actor	Richard Burton	Nominated
Academy Awards	Best Actor	Peter O'Toole	Nominated
Academy Awards	Best Supporting Actor	John Gielgud	Nominated
Academy Awards	Best Screenplay – Based on Material from Another Medium	Edward Anhalt	Won
Academy Awards	Best Art Direction – Color	Art Direction: John Bryan and Maurice Carter; Set Decoration: Patrick McLoughlin and Robert Cartwright	Nominated
Academy Awards	Best Cinematography – Color	Geoffrey Unsworth	Nominated
Academy Awards	Best Costume Design – Color	Margaret Furse	Nominated
Academy Awards	Best Film Editing	Anne V. Coates	Nominated
Academy Awards	Best Scoring of Music – Substantially Original	Laurence Rosenthal	Nominated
Academy Awards	Best Sound	John Cox	Nominated
American Cinema Editors Awards	Best Edited Feature Film	Anne V. Coates	Nominated
British Academy Film Awards	Best Film from any Source	Peter Glenville	Nominated
British Academy Film Awards	Best British Film	Peter Glenville	Nominated
British Academy Film Awards	Best British Actor	Peter O'Toole	Nominated
British Academy Film Awards	Best British Screenplay	Edward Anhalt	Nominated
British Academy Film Awards	Best British Art Direction – Colour	John Bryan	Won
British Academy Film Awards	Best British Cinematography – Colour	Geoffrey Unsworth	Won
British Academy Film Awards	Best British Costume Design – Colour	Margaret Furse	Won
British Society of Cinematographers Awards	Best Cinematography in a Theatrical Feature Film	Geoffrey Unsworth	Won
Cinema Writers Circle Awards	Best Foreign Film		Won
Directors Guild of America Awards	Outstanding Directorial Achievement in Motion Pictures	Peter Glenville	Nominated
Fotogramas de Plata	Best Foreign Performer	Richard Burton	Won
Golden Globe Awards	Best Motion Picture – Drama		Won
Golden Globe Awards	Best Actor in a Motion Picture – Drama	Richard Burton	Nominated
Golden Globe Awards	Best Actor in a Motion Picture – Drama	Peter O'Toole	Won
Golden Globe Awards	Best Director – Motion Picture	Peter Glenville	Nominated
Golden Globe Awards	Best Original Score – Motion Picture	Laurence Rosenthal	Nominated
Laurel Awards	Top Drama		4th Place
Laurel Awards	Top Male Dramatic Performance	Richard Burton	Won
Laurel Awards	Top Male Dramatic Performance	Peter O'Toole	4th Place
National Board of Review Awards	Best Film		Won
National Board of Review Awards	Top Ten Films		2nd Place
New York Film Critics Circle Awards	Best Screenplay	Edward Anhalt	Nominated
Sant Jordi Awards	Best Performance in a Foreign Film	Peter O'Toole	Won
Writers Guild of America Awards	Best Written American Drama	Edward Anhalt	Won

== Legacy ==
Becket and its spiritual sequel The Lion in Winter were both nominated for Best Picture in their respective years 1964 and 1968. Both lost in years which were considered by many to be musical film showdowns, where two high-profile musical films were in contention to win Best Picture: Mary Poppins and winner My Fair Lady against Becket in 1964, Funny Girl and winner Oliver! against The Lion in Winter in 1968.

Julia Roberts said that this movie was a "turning point" for her and inspired her to become a serious actor. Roberts' High School teacher showed it to her class, and she was "overwhelmed" by it.

== Preservation ==
The Academy Film Archive preserved Becket in 2003.

== See also ==
- List of American films of 1964
- List of historical drama films
