= Barbara Ling =

American production designer (1952–2026)

- Born: August 1952
- Died: July 9, 2026 (aged 73); Santa Barbara, California, U.S.
- Occupation: Production designer
- Notable work: Once Upon a Time in Hollywood (2019)

Barbara Ling (August 1952 – July 9, 2026) was an American production designer. In 2020, she and set decorator Nancy Haigh won the Academy Award for Best Production Design for their work on Once Upon a Time in Hollywood (2019).

== Life and career ==
Ling was born in August 1952. She grew up in Los Angeles and worked on numerous films, including Batman Forever, and Batman & Robin. Ling died of cancer on July 9, 2026, at the age of 73. She was survived by her wife and two sons.

== Filmography ==
Year	Film	Director	Notes
1986	True Stories	David Byrne	
1987	Making Mr. Right	Susan Seidelman	
1987	Heaven	Diane Keaton	Documentary
1987	Less than Zero	Marek Kanievska	
1989	Checking Out	David Leland	
1990	Men Don't Leave	Paul Brickman	
1991	The Doors	Oliver Stone	
1991	V.I. Warshawski	Jeff Kanew	
1991	Fried Green Tomatoes	Jon Avnet	
1993	Falling Down	Joel Schumacher	
1994	With Honors	Alek Keshishian	
1995	Batman Forever	Joel Schumacher	
1997	Batman & Robin	Joel Schumacher	
2001	Hearts in Atlantis	Scott Hicks	
2007	No Reservations	Scott Hicks	
2012	The Lucky One	Scott Hicks	
2016	Fallen	Scott Hicks	
2019	Once Upon a Time in Hollywood	Quentin Tarantino	Academy Award for Best Production Design; Art Directors Guild Award for Excellence in Production Design for a Period Film; Critics' Choice Movie Award for Best Production Design; Nominated – BAFTA Award for Best Production Design; Nominated – Satellite Award for Best Art Direction and Production Design
2022	A Man Called Otto	Marc Forster	
2026	Michael	Antoine Fuqua	
