= The Pumpkin Eater =

1964 British film by Jack Clayton

- Theatrical poster
- Directed by: Jack Clayton
- Screenplay by: Harold Pinter
- Based on: The Pumpkin Eater; 1962 novel by Penelope Mortimer
- Produced by: James Woolf
- Starring: Anne Bancroft; Peter Finch; James Mason; Cedric Hardwicke; Yootha Joyce
- Cinematography: Oswald Morris
- Edited by: Jim Clark
- Music by: Georges Delerue
- Color process: black and white
- Production company: Romulus-Jack Clayton
- Distributed by: Columbia Pictures
- Release date: 14 July 1964
- Running time: 118 minutes 110 minutes (TCM print)
- Country: United Kingdom
- Language: English
- Box office: $1.2 million (US/Canada rentals)

The Pumpkin Eater is a 1964 British drama film directed by Jack Clayton and starring Anne Bancroft and Peter Finch. The film was adapted by Harold Pinter from the 1962 novel of the same title by Penelope Mortimer. The title is a reference to the nursery rhyme "Peter Peter Pumpkin Eater".

== Plot ==
The film's narrative revolves around Jo Armitage, a woman with six children from three marriages, who becomes negative and withdrawn after discovering that her third (and current) husband, Jake, has been unfaithful to her. After a series of loosely related events in which Jake's infidelity is balanced by his reliability as a breadwinner and a father, Jo and Jake take a first tentative step toward reconciliation.

Thematically, there are two issues: Jo's frequent childbearing and Jake's extramarital affairs. The question of Jo's fertility is first broached by her psychiatrist. He suggests that she may feel uncomfortable with the messiness or vulgarity of sex and that she may be using childbirth to justify it to herself. This does not prevent her from becoming pregnant again, but she follows suggestions by Jake and her doctor that she have an abortion and be sterilized, and she seems happy after the operation.

Meanwhile, signs accumulate that Jake has been having affairs while pursuing a successful career as a screenwriter. The first indication of his infidelity concerns Philpot, a young woman who lived with the Armitage family for a while. Jake reacts irrationally and unconvincingly to Jo's questions after the children tell her the woman fainted into Jake's arms. The second sign comes from Bob Conway, an acquaintance who alleges an affair between his wife and Jake during production of a film in Morocco. Finally, Jake admits some of his infidelities under heated interrogation by Jo. After venting her frustration by furiously assaulting him, she retaliates by having an affair with her second husband. This elicits coldness from Jake.

In the film's finale, Jo spends a night alone in a windmill (near the converted barn she had lived in with her second husband and children) that the couple has been renovating. The following morning, Jake and their children arrive at the windmill with food. Seeing how happy her children are with Jake, Jo indicates her acceptance of him sadly, but graciously, accepting a tin of beer from him, a gesture which echoes another scene in the windmill from a happier time in their marriage.

== Cast ==
- Anne Bancroft as Jo Armitage
- Peter Finch as Jake Armitage
- James Mason as Bob Conway
- Janine Gray as Beth Conway
- Cedric Hardwicke as Mr James, Jo's father (in his final feature film role)
- Rosaline Atkinson as Mrs James, Jo's mother
- Alan Webb as Mr Armitage, Jake's father
- Maggie Smith as Philpot
- Richard Johnson as Giles
- Eric Porter as psychiatrist
- Cyril Luckham as doctor
- John Junkin as undertaker
- Yootha Joyce as woman at hairdresser's
- Gerald Sim as man at party
- Frank Singuineau as King of Israel
- Frances White as older Dinah

== Reception ==
Time magazine wrote "Though Pumpkin Eater in outline resembles a compendium of womanly woes, it plays like a house afire, almost invariably ignited by actress Bancroft, who could probably strike dramatic lightning from a recitation of tide tables...And her spectacular scenes with Finch, pitched against the din of a more or less anonymous army of progeny, are a litany of love, hate, lies, jealousy and excruciating domestic boredom."

Variety wrote "[Pinter's] script vividly brings to life the principal characters in this story of a shattered marriage, though Pinter's resort to flashback technique is confusing in the early stages. Jack Clayton's direction gets off to a slow, almost casual start, but the pace quickens as the drama becomes more intense. He has used the considerable acting talents at his command for the maximum results."

Bosley Crowther of The New York Times was critical of Pinter's script, and Clayton's direction, which he felt was "somewhat mechanical, too, tumbling his drama in a confusion of jump cuts and fleeting images...With a good deal more body to the drama and point to the characters, Mr. Clayton would have a picture that comes close to representing truth."

The Monthly Film Bulletin stated "There is something phantasmally absurd about this well-meaning, ambitious film...It could well be that Pinter's brilliance is altogether the wrong kind of brilliance to let loose on the scripting of this already nerve-raw, nightmarish subject. Jo...makes an eminently worthwhile, but virtually intractable, subject for a film: worthwhile because neurotics rarely get a square, sympathetic, penetrating deal in the cinema; intractable because, like many neurotics, she is a fixated and evidently crashing bore, and one of the most difficult things to do is to present a bore fairly without at the same time boring your audience too."

The film has continued to provoke comments. In a 1999 obituary of Penelope Mortimer, Giles Gordon in The Guardian characterized Harold Pinter as someone who values what is "written between the lines," making him "her ideal translator and interpreter" for the film adaptation of Mortimer's novel.

In 2006, David Hare wrote that "Pinter regularly offers actors what will become the opportunities of a lifetime: to Meryl Streep, obviously, in The French Lieutenant's Woman; to Peter Finch and Anne Bancroft in one of the most overlooked of all British films, The Pumpkin Eater; and, unforgettably, to Dirk Bogarde, both in Accident and The Servant."

Of the supporting cast, Yootha Joyce as a psychotic young woman sitting opposite Bancroft under the hairdryers, delivered a performance that has been called by Clayton's biographer one of the "best screen acting miniatures one could hope to see."

== Awards and nominations ==
Award	Category	Nominee(s)	Result
Academy Awards	Best Actress	Anne Bancroft	Nominated
British Academy Film Awards	Best Film from any Source		Nominated
British Academy Film Awards	Best British Film		Nominated
British Academy Film Awards	Best Foreign Actress	Anne Bancroft	Won
British Academy Film Awards	Best British Screenplay	Harold Pinter	Won
British Academy Film Awards	Best British Art Direction – Black and White	Ted Marshall	Nominated
British Academy Film Awards	Best British Cinematography – Black and White	Oswald Morris	Won
British Academy Film Awards	Best British Costume Design – Black and White	Motley Theatre Design Group	Won
Cannes Film Festival	Palme d'Or	Jack Clayton	Nominated
Cannes Film Festival	Best Actress	Anne Bancroft	Won (Note: Tied with Barbara Barrie for One Potato, Two Potato.)
Golden Globe Awards	Best Actress in a Motion Picture – Drama	Anne Bancroft	Won
Laurel Awards	Top Female Dramatic Performance	Anne Bancroft	Nominated

== Home media ==
The Pumpkin Eater was released as a fullscreen DVD by Sony Pictures Home Entertainment on 4 March 2011. A Blu-ray edition was released by Powerhouse Films on 4 December 2017.
