= John Box =

British film production designer

John Box working on a design for Oliver! (1968)

John Allan Hyatt Box OBE (27 January 1920 – 7 March 2005) was a British film production designer and art director. He won the Academy Award for Best Art Direction on four occasions and won the equivalent BAFTA three times, a record for both awards. Throughout his career he gained a reputation for recreating exotic locations in rather more mundane surroundings; he once created a walled Chinese city in Snowdonia.

== Early life ==
Box was born in London, and attended Highgate School from 1934 to 1938. Due to his father's job as a civil engineer, he spent much of his childhood in Sri Lanka, then the British colony of Ceylon. After studying architecture at North London Polytechnic. He served with the British Army during World War II, being commissioned into the Hampshire Regiment (later the Royal Hampshire Regiment) on 21 December 1940, but then transferred to the Royal Armoured Corps (RAC) on 1 June 1942.

== Career ==
After the war Box served his apprenticeship an assistant to the art director Carmen Dillon, herself an Oscar winner. During this period he worked with her on Anthony Asquith's adaptation of The Browning Version (1951) and The Importance of Being Earnest (1952).

Box's first films as an art director were low budget affairs, the first being the science fiction B-movie The Gamma People (1956). His first big break came when director Mark Robson asked him to work on the period film The Inn of the Sixth Happiness (1957), which starred Ingrid Bergman. After this Box worked on Carol Reed's adaptation of Graham Greene's novel Our Man in Havana (1959) and Richard Quine's The World of Suzie Wong (1960).

As production designer of Lawrence of Arabia (1962), he first worked for the British director David Lean, as well as winning his first Oscar. Box got the job working on this film after John Bryan fell ill. Box designed Of Human Bondage (1964) and worked with Lean again on the adaptation of Doctor Zhivago (1965), for which he again won an Oscar for his set designs.

The following year Box won his first BAFTA award for his reproduction of Tudor England in Fred Zinnemann's version of A Man for All Seasons (1966). In his next production he recreated Victorian era London for the musical Oliver! (1968). He won an Oscar for Oliver!, a feat he repeated in his next film three years later, Nicholas and Alexandra (1971), which provided Box with his final Academy Award for his detailed reproduction of pre-revolution Russia.

In 1972, Box worked on Travels with My Aunt, for which he received another Oscar nomination. He won a BAFTA for his role on Jack Clayton's version of The Great Gatsby (1974), and won the award again the following year for Rollerball.

Box's next two projects were 1977's Sorcerer (1977) and The Keep (1983), both of which were expensive and unsuccessful. He reunited with David Lean for the film A Passage to India (1984), for which Box received Oscar and BAFTA nominations. He retired after this film, but returned in the mid-90s to work on an adaptation of Black Beauty, as well as First Knight, his first foray into computer assisted set design and his final film.

He was awarded the OBE in 1998.

== See also ==
- Art Directors Guild Hall of Fame
