= Ray Simm =

British art director

- Occupation: Art director
- Years active: 1947-1976 (film)

Ray Simm was a British art director. He was nominated three times for the BAFTA Award for Best Production Design for The Slipper and the Rose, The Wrong Box and Darling, for which he won.

== Selected filmography ==
- The Faithful City (1952)
- Brandy for the Parson (1952)
- You're Only Young Twice (1952)
- The Wedding of Lilli Marlene (1953)
- Laxdale Hall (1953)
- Conflict of Wings (1954)
- A Yank in Ermine (1955)
- The Extra Day (1956)
- The Rising of the Moon (1957)
- Bonjour Tristesse (1958)
- Idol on Parade (1959)
- Killers of Kilimanjaro (1959)
- Jazz Boat (1960)
- The Angry Silence (1960)
- Tarzan the Magnificent (1960)
- The Hellfire Club (1961)
- Whistle Down the Wind (1961)
- The Mark (1961)
- All Night Long (1962)
- The Dock Brief (1962)
- The L-Shaped Room (1962)
- A Kind of Loving (1962)
- Billy Liar (1963)
- Seance on a Wet Afternoon (1964)
- A Hard Day's Night (1964)
- Help! (1965)
- Darling (1965)
- The Wrong Box (1966)
- Deadfall (1968)
- The Madwoman of Chaillot (1969))
- The Breaking of Bumbo (1970)
- The Reckoning (1970)
- Fragment of Fear (1970)
- Dulcima (1971)
- Straw Dogs (1971)
- No Sex Please, We're British (1973)
- Hennessy (1975)
- The Slipper and the Rose (1976)

== Bibliography ==
- Tag Gallagher. John Ford: The Man and His Films. University of California Press, 1988.
