= Geoffrey Kirkland =

English production designer

- Born: 1939 (age 86–87); England
- Occupation: Production designer
- Years active: 1964-present

Geoffrey Kirkland (born 1939) is an English production designer. He was nominated for an Academy Award in the category Best Art Direction for the film The Right Stuff. He is also a two-time BAFTA winner for his work in Bugsy Malone and Children of Men. He was also nominated for a Primetime Emmy for his work in Hemingway & Gellhorn.

== Selected filmography ==
- Bugsy Malone (1976)
- Midnight Express (1978)
- Fame (1980)
- WarGames (1983)
- The Right Stuff (1983)
- Space Jam (1996)
- Children of Men (2006)
- Hemingway & Gellhorn (2012)
