= The Reckoning (1970 film) =

1969 British drama film directed by Jack Gold

- Directed by: Jack Gold
- Screenplay by: John McGrath
- Based on: The Harp That Once by Patrick Hall
- Produced by: Ronald Shedlo; Hugh Perceval
- Starring: Nicol Williamson; Ann Bell; Rachel Roberts; Zena Walker
- Cinematography: Geoffrey Unsworth
- Edited by: Peter Weatherley
- Music by: Malcolm Arnold
- Production company: Columbia Pictures
- Distributed by: Columbia Pictures
- Release dates: 8 January 1970 (London, premiere)
- Running time: 111 minutes
- Country: United Kingdom
- Language: English

The Reckoning is a 1970 British drama film released by Columbia Pictures directed by Jack Gold and starring Nicol Williamson, Ann Bell, Rachel Roberts and Zena Walker. It was based on the 1967 novel The Harp that Once by Patrick Hall and features music by Malcolm Arnold.

== Plot ==
Michael "Mick" Marler is a high-ranking corporate executive who has risen to his position despite his working-class background. One morning, while he is trying to save his boss, Hazlitt, from mistakes and sagging sales, Mick convinces him to persuade the company to make computers, something the board of directors had rejected. After Hazlitt agrees, Mick's wife Rosemary calls to inform him that his father, John Joe, is dying. Mick wants to leave but is coerced by Hazlitt into completing a report. Afterwards, Mick drives his Jaguar to his childhood neighbourhood in Liverpool.

Mick is devastated to discover that his father has already died, and is further disturbed to find dark bruises on his face and body. After questioning everyone present in the house, Mick visits an Irish social hall to speak with Cocky Burke, his father's best friend. Cocky says that John Joe, a popular amateur balladeer, suffered a heart attack after English "Teddy boys" physically attacked him for singing an Irish rebel song. Mick asks Cocky to go to the police, but Cocky, who distrusts the authorities, tells Mick to avenge his father. Angered by Rosemary's reluctance to attend the funeral, Mick returns to the hall but is spirited away by Joyce, a nurse working for his father's doctor, when police break up a fight. Unsatisfied by her husband, she and Mick visit his former house and make love.

Returning to London, Mick and Hazlitt have a successful board meeting, after which Mick goes home and propositions Rosemary. When she instead tells him she is giving a planned party, he angrily goes drinking. A drunken Mick later returns home and makes a scene where he punches Sir Miles Bishton, a member of the board. The partygoers, including Rosemary, leave after Mick rants about doing dirty work for English gentlemen. The next day, Hazlitt suspends Mick and anticipates his dismissal when the head of the company, Moyle, returns from a trip. At home, Rosemary leaves Mick.

Hearing that a magistrate has ruled his father's death accidental, Mick again drives to Liverpool. Mick checks into an obscure hotel, arranges for the manager to give him an alibi, borrows a local company car and drives to the social hall. Soon Jones, the "Teddy" identified as his father's attacker, arrives, prompting Mick to savagely beat him with a pipe. When Mick checks out in the morning, he learns from the manager that police had been looking for him the previous night. Mick drives toward Joyce's address but drives away upon seeing her with children. He bids an affectionate goodbye to his mother, who also reports that the police have come around looking for him.

Driving home, Mick thinks of Hilda, Hazlitt's secretary, who has feelings for him. He visits Hilda, seduces her and cajoles her into revealing damaging information about Hazlitt. When summoned for a meeting with Moyle, Mick divulges that Hazlitt has persistently stolen ideas from underlings and blamed them for his errors. Remembering that men Hazlitt has dismissed have been successful elsewhere, Moyle says he is replacing him with Mick. Moyle assumes that Mick will want to keep Hilda, but Mick says she is untrustworthy. During a celebratory drink, Moyle sympathises about Rosemary leaving: when Mick says she will not return, Moyle assures him she will.

Subsequently, as a reconciled Mick and Rosemary are on a motorway, he recklessly speeds past a barrier and narrowly misses hitting an oncoming truck. Exhilarated, Mick says, "If I can get away with that, I can get away with anything."

== Cast ==
- Nicol Williamson as Michael Marler
- Rachel Roberts as Joyce Eglington
- Ann Bell as Rosemary Marler
- Zena Walker as Hilda Greening
- Paul Rogers as John Hazlitt
- Tom Kempinski as Brunzy
- Kenneth Hendel as Davidson
- Douglas Wilmer as Moyle
- Barbara Ewing as Joan
- Gwen Nelson as Michael's Mother
- Christine Hargreaves as Kath
- Ernest C. Jennings as Dad John Joe
- Godfrey Quigley as Dr. Carolan
- Desmond Perry as Father Madden
- J. G. Devlin as Cocky Burke
- Joe Gladwin as drunk
- Peter Sallis as Keresley
- Jackie Pallo as wrestler
- Tony Charles as wrestler
- Christian Rodska as Jones

== Production ==
=== Filming ===
The film was shot at Shepperton Studios and on location around London and Liverpool, where locations included Seacombe, Wallasey, Birkenhead and the dockland Four Bridges.

=== Production notes ===
The film's sets were designed by the art director Ray Simm.

Produced during 1969, the film was released on 8 January 1970.

== Critical reception ==
The Monthly Film Bulletin wrote: "The Bofors Gun, the first collaboration between Jack Gold, John McGrath and Nicol Williamson, was serious, memorable, compelling. In that film, as in Nicol Williamson's work as a whole, an essential element was the sense of an inner despair, self-directed and self-destructive in its intensity, but with a certain tragic dimension regardless of the particular milieu. In this sense, The Reckoning is a film of echoes: as Mick Marler, Williamson plays a very similar role, and again Jack Gold follows the career and explores the motives of a man incapable of living in harmony with society. Mick's system is to wage war against his wife and her class, against his fellow executives, against each and every driver on the road, so that the film ends with the reckoning still to come and Mick exulting "If I can get away with that, I can get away with anything!" as he narrowly avoids a crash. So far, so good. But once this scheme is put into practice, the plot emerges as little more than a string of clichés tortuously contrived or boringly obvious. ... Williamson's performance is polished but unexciting ... Most of the important themes of The Reckoning are coarsened; and film as a whole remains no more than the sophisticated sum total of the sophisticated machinery that made it."

Leslie Halliwell said: "Interesting melodrama of a man disgusted with both bourgeois and working-class values; slickly made and fast-moving."
