= 22nd Golden Globe Awards =

Film award ceremony in 1965

- Date: February 8, 1965

Highlights
- Best Film: Drama: Becket
- Best Film: Musical or Comedy: My Fair Lady

The 22nd Golden Globe Awards, honoring the best in film and television for 1964, were held on February 8, 1965.

== Winners and nominees ==
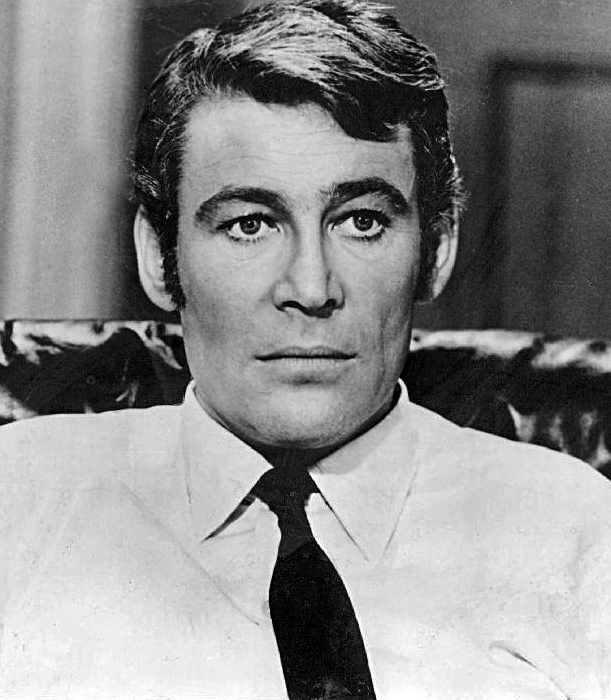
Peter O'Toole won for Becket

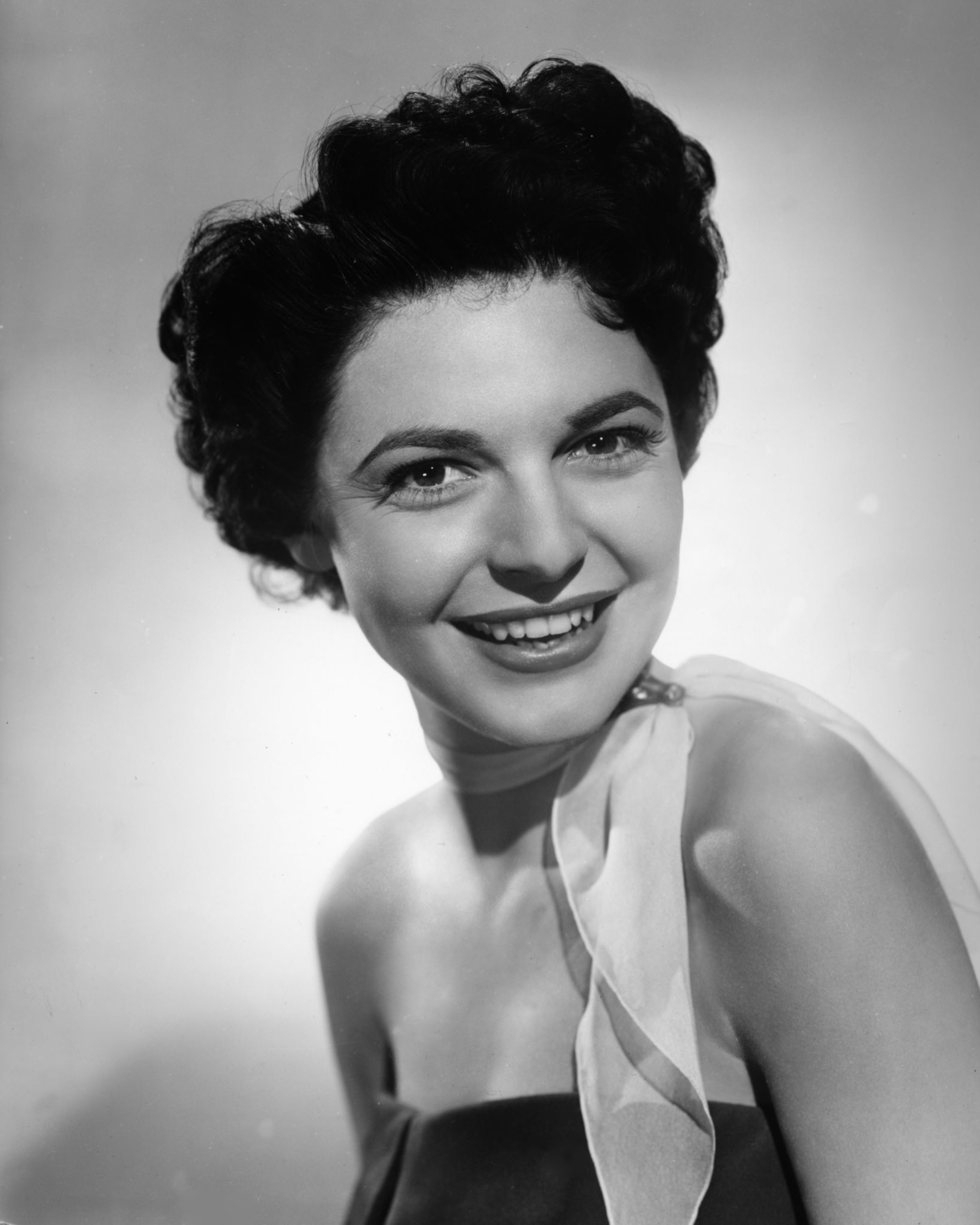
Anne Bancroft won for The Pumpkin Eater

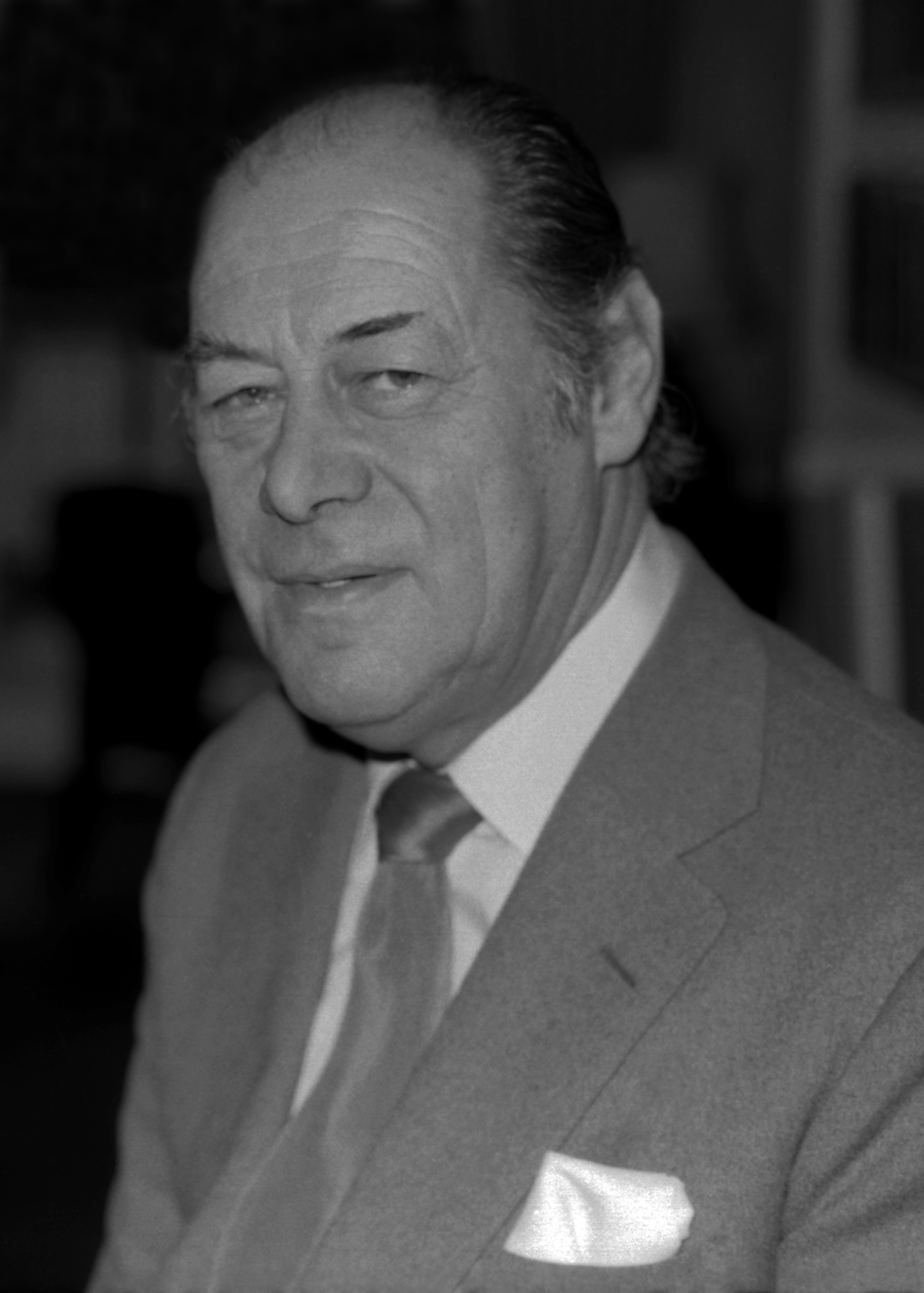
Rex Harrison won for My Fair Lady

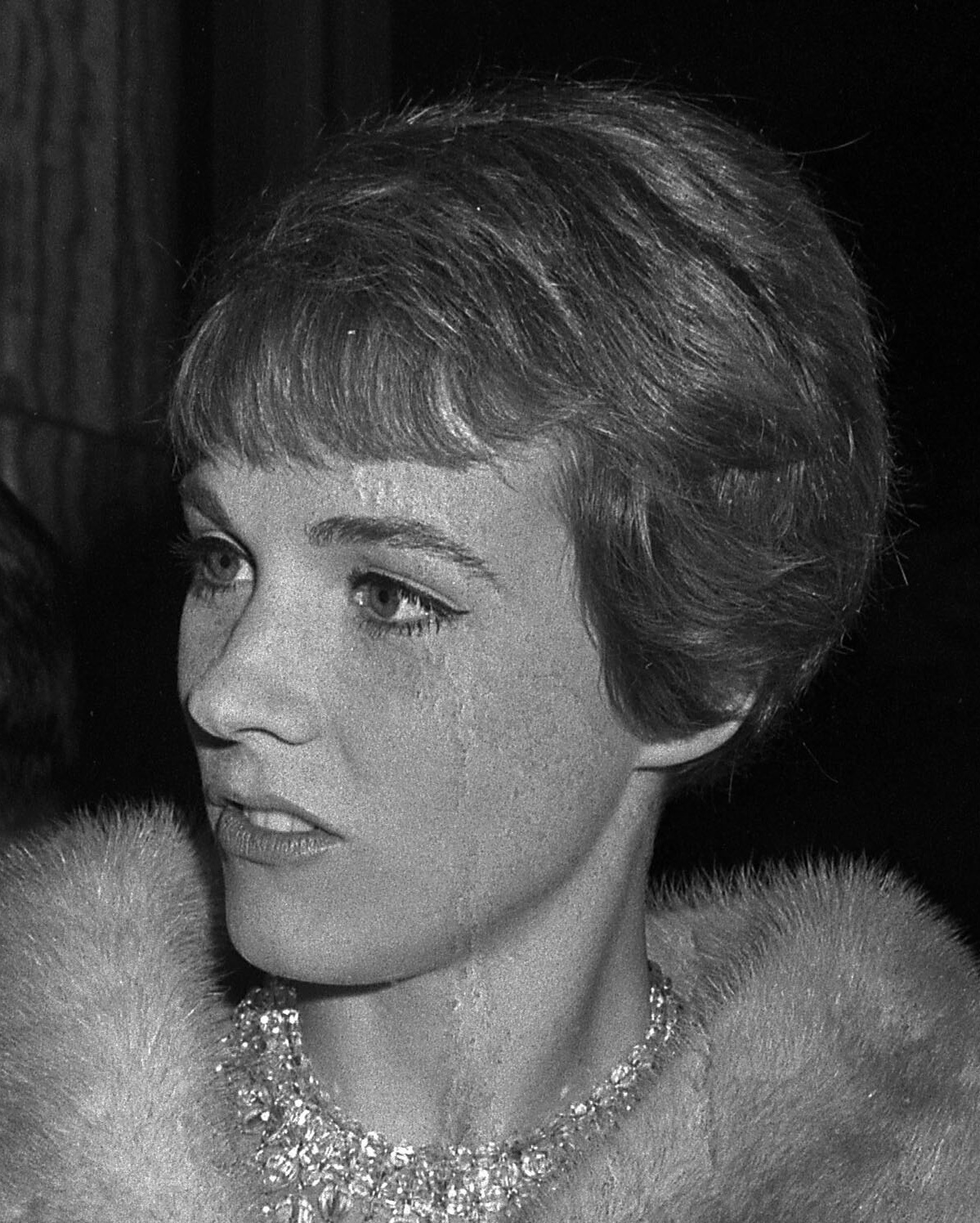
Dame Julie Andrews won for Mary Poppins

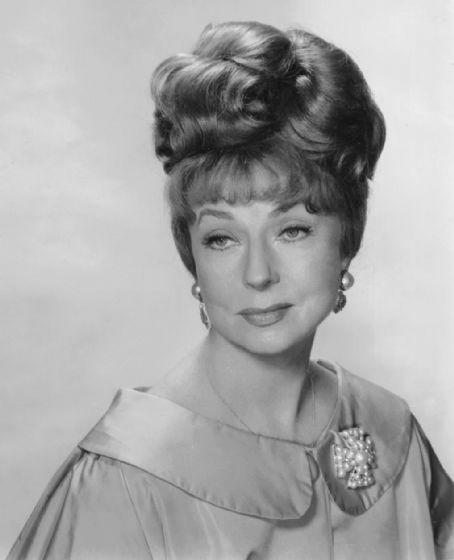
Agnes Moorehead won for Hush...Hush, Sweet Charlotte

=== Film ===
Best Motion Picture
Drama	Comedy or Musical
Becket; The Chalk Garden; Dear Heart; The Night of the Iguana; Zorba the Greek	My Fair Lady; Father Goose; Mary Poppins; The Unsinkable Molly Brown; The World of Henry Orient
Best Performance in a Motion Picture – Drama
Actor	Actress
Peter O'Toole – Becket; Richard Burton – Becket; Anthony Franciosa – Rio Conchos; Fredric March – Seven Days in May; Anthony Quinn – Zorba the Greek	Anne Bancroft – The Pumpkin Eater; Ava Gardner – The Night of the Iguana; Rita Hayworth – Circus World; Geraldine Page – Dear Heart; Jean Seberg – Lilith
Best Performance in a Motion Picture – Comedy or Musical
Actor	Actress
Rex Harrison – My Fair Lady; Marcello Mastroianni – Marriage Italian Style; Peter Sellers – The Pink Panther; Peter Ustinov – Topkapi; Dick Van Dyke – Mary Poppins	Julie Andrews – Mary Poppins; Audrey Hepburn – My Fair Lady; Sophia Loren – Marriage Italian Style; Melina Mercouri – Topkapi; Debbie Reynolds – The Unsinkable Molly Brown
Best Supporting Performance in a Motion Picture – Drama, Comedy or Musical
Supporting Actor	Supporting Actress
Edmond O'Brien – Seven Days in May; Cyril Delevanti – The Night of the Iguana; Stanley Holloway – My Fair Lady; Gilbert Roland – Cheyenne Autumn; Lee Tracy – The Best Man	Agnes Moorehead – Hush...Hush, Sweet Charlotte; Elizabeth Ashley – The Carpetbaggers; Grayson Hall – The Night of the Iguana; Lila Kedrova – Zorba the Greek; Ann Sothern – The Best Man
Other
Best Director
George Cukor – My Fair Lady; Michael Cacoyannis – Zorba the Greek; John Frankenheimer – Seven Days in May; Peter Glenville – Becket; John Huston – The Night of the Iguana
Best Original Score	Best Original Song
"The Fall of the Roman Empire" – Dimitri Tiomkin; "Becket" – Laurence Rosenthal; "Mary Poppins" – Richard M. and Robert B. Sherman; "Seven Days in May" – Jerry Goldsmith; "Zorba the Greek" – Mikis Theodorakis	"Circus World" – Circus World; "Dear Heart" – Dear Heart; "From Russia with Love" – From Russia with Love; "Sunday in New York" – Sunday in New York; "Where Love Has Gone" – Where Love Has Gone

=== Television ===
Best Television Series
Best TV Show
The Rogues; 12 O'Clock High; The Munsters; The Red Skelton Show; Wendy and Me
Best Performance in a Television Series
Best TV Star - Male	Best TV Star - Female
Gene Barry – Burke's Law; Richard Crenna – Slattery's People; James Franciscus – Mr. Novak; David Janssen – The Fugitive; Robert Vaughn – The Man from U.N.C.L.E.	Mary Tyler Moore – The Dick Van Dyke Show; Dorothy Malone – Peyton Place; Yvette Mimieux – Dr. Kildare; Elizabeth Montgomery – Bewitched; Julie Newmar – My Living Doll
