= Stuart Craig =

British production designer (1942–2025)

Stuart Craig OBE RDI
- Born: 14 April 1942; Norwich, Norfolk, England
- Died: 7 September 2025 (aged 83); Windsor, Berkshire, England
- Education: Norwich University of the Arts; Royal College of Art
- Occupation: Production designer
- Years active: 1967–2022
- Spouse: Patricia Stangroom (m. 1965)
- Children: 2
- Awards: Best Art Direction; 1982 Gandhi; 1988 Dangerous Liaisons; 1996 The English Patient; Best Production Design; 1980 The Elephant Man; 2005 Harry Potter and the Goblet of Fire; 2016 Fantastic Beasts and Where to Find Them

Stuart Norman Craig OBE RDI (14 April 1942 – 7 September 2025) was a British production designer. In a career spanning a half-century, he won three Academy Awards and three BAFTAs. He was particularly known for his work with Stephenie McMillan on the Harry Potter films, and with Anna Pinnock on the Fantastic Beasts films.

== Life and career ==
=== Background ===
Stuart Norman Craig was born in Norwich on 14 April 1942. His film career started upon his graduation from the Royal College of Art in 1966.

In 1966, Craig married Patricia Stangroom, with whom he had two children. He died from Parkinson's disease at his home in Windsor, Berkshire, on 7 September 2025, at the age of 83.

=== Career ===
Craig was nominated for eleven Academy Awards, and won three: in 1982 for Gandhi, in 1988 for Dangerous Liaisons, and in 1996 for The English Patient. He was nominated for a BAFTA award sixteen times, including for the first six and last Potter films, and won three times: in 1980 for The Elephant Man, in 2005 for Harry Potter and the Goblet of Fire, and in 2016 for Fantastic Beasts and Where to Find Them.

For his work on The English Patient, Harry Potter and the Philosopher's Stone, Harry Potter and Order of the Phoenix, Harry Potter and the Half-Blood Prince, and Harry Potter and the Deathly Hallows – Part 1 and Part 2, Craig was nominated for an Art Directors Guild award and won the same for The English Patient and Harry Potter and the Deathly Hallows – Part 2. The Guild has also honoured Craig with a Lifetime Achievement Award at the awards ceremony on 16 February 2008.

At Potter author J. K. Rowling's request, he worked with Universal Creative team to design the Wizarding World of Harry Potter at Universal's Islands of Adventure theme park. Rowling said in a December 2007 interview on the Potter podcast PotterCast, "The key thing for me was that, if there was to be a theme park, that Stuart Craig … would be involved. … More than involved, that he would pretty much design it. Because I love the look of the films; they really mirror what’s been in my imagination for all these years".

Craig was nominated for a BAFTA Award for six films in a row, namely the first six Harry Potter films.

== Filmography ==
As art director

- A Bridge Too Far (1977)
- Superman (1978)

As production designer

Year	Title	Director
1980	Saturn 3	Stanley Donen
1980	The Elephant Man	David Lynch
1982	Gandhi	Richard Attenborough
1984	Greystoke: The Legend of Tarzan, Lord of the Apes	Hugh Hudson
1984	Cal	Pat O'Connor
1986	The Mission	Roland Joffé
1987	Cry Freedom	Richard Attenborough
1988	Dangerous Liaisons	Stephen Frears
1988	Stars and Bars	Pat O'Connor
1990	Memphis Belle	Michael Caton-Jones
1992	Chaplin	Richard Attenborough
1993	The Secret Garden	Agnieszka Holland
1993	Shadowlands	Richard Attenborough
1996	Mary Reilly	Stephen Frears
1996	The English Patient	Anthony Minghella
1996	In Love and War	Richard Attenborough
1998	The Avengers	Jeremiah S. Chechik
1999	Notting Hill	Roger Michell
2000	The Legend of Bagger Vance	Robert Redford
2001	Harry Potter and the Philosopher's Stone	Chris Columbus
2002	Harry Potter and the Chamber of Secrets	Chris Columbus
2004	Harry Potter and the Prisoner of Azkaban	Alfonso Cuarón
2005	Harry Potter and the Goblet of Fire	Mike Newell
2007	Harry Potter and the Order of the Phoenix	David Yates
2009	Harry Potter and the Half-Blood Prince	David Yates
2010	Harry Potter and the Deathly Hallows: Part 1	David Yates
2011	Harry Potter and the Deathly Hallows: Part 2	David Yates
2012	Gambit	Michael Hoffman
2016	The Legend of Tarzan	David Yates
2016	Fantastic Beasts and Where to Find Them	David Yates
2018	Fantastic Beasts: The Crimes of Grindelwald	David Yates
2022	Fantastic Beasts: The Secrets of Dumbledore	David Yates

== Awards and nominations ==
Academy Awards

Year	Category	Nominated work	Result	Ref.
1980	Best Art Direction	The Elephant Man	Nominated	
1982	Best Art Direction	Gandhi	Won	
1986	Best Art Direction	The Mission	Nominated	
1988	Best Art Direction	Dangerous Liaisons	Won	
1992	Best Art Direction	Chaplin	Nominated	
1996	Best Art Direction	The English Patient	Won	
2001	Best Art Direction	Harry Potter and the Philosopher's Stone	Nominated	
2005	Best Art Direction	Harry Potter and the Goblet of Fire	Nominated	
2010	Best Art Direction	Harry Potter and the Deathly Hallows – Part 1	Nominated	
2011	Best Art Direction	Harry Potter and the Deathly Hallows – Part 2	Nominated	
2016	Best Production Design	Fantastic Beasts and Where to Find Them	Nominated	

British Academy Film Awards

Year	Category	Nominated work	Result	Ref.
1980	Best Production Design	The Elephant Man	Won	
1982	Best Production Design	Gandhi	Nominated	
1984	Best Production Design	Greystoke: The Legend of Tarzan, Lord of the Apes	Nominated	
1986	Best Production Design	The Mission	Nominated	
1989	Best Production Design	Dangerous Liaisons	Nominated	
1992	Best Production Design	Chaplin	Nominated	
1996	Best Production Design	The English Patient	Nominated	
2001	Best Production Design	Harry Potter and the Philosopher's Stone	Nominated	
2002	Best Production Design	Harry Potter and the Chamber of Secrets	Nominated	
2004	Best Production Design	Harry Potter and the Prisoner of Azkaban	Nominated	
2005	Best Production Design	Harry Potter and the Goblet of Fire	Won	
2007	Best Production Design	Harry Potter and the Order of the Phoenix	Nominated	
2009	Best Production Design	Harry Potter and the Half-Blood Prince	Nominated	
2011	Best Production Design	Harry Potter and the Deathly Hallows – Part 2	Nominated	
2016	Best Production Design	Fantastic Beasts and Where to Find Them	Won	
2018	Best Production Design	Fantastic Beasts: The Crimes of Grindelwald	Nominated	

== See also ==
- List of Academy Award winners and nominees from Great Britain
