= Anastasia Masaro =

Canadian production designer

- Born: November 12, 1974 (age 51); Toronto, Ontario, Canada
- Occupation: production designer
- Years active: 1997-present

Anastasia Masaro (born November 12, 1974) is a production designer who was nominated for both an Academy Award and a British Academy Film Award for the film The Imaginarium of Doctor Parnassus.

== Selected filmography ==
- Tully (2018)
- XX (2017)
- Life (2015)
- Arcade Fire: Reflektor (2013)
- Pawn Shop Chronicles (2013)
- Mama (2013)
- Make Your Move 3D (2013)
- The Imaginarium of Doctor Parnassus (2009)
- Dead Silence (2007)
- Tideland (2005)

== Recognition ==
- 2014 MTV Video Music Award for Best Art Direction - Arcade Fire: Reflektor - Winner
- 2014 ADG Excellence in Production Design Award for Commercial, PSA, Promo, and Music Video - Arcade Fire: Reflektor - Nominated
- 2013 DGC Craft Award for Outstanding Production Design - Feature Film - Mama - Nominated
- 2010 Academy Award for Best Art Direction - The Imaginarium of Doctor Parnassus - Nominated
- 2010 BAFTA Award for Best Production Design - The Imaginarium of Doctor Parnassus - Nominated
- 2009 San Diego Film Critics Society Award for Best Art Direction - The Imaginarium of Doctor Parnassus - 2nd Place
- 2009 Satellite Award for Best Art Direction & Production Design - The Imaginarium of Doctor Parnassus - Nominated
- 2008 ADG Excellence in Production Design Award for Television Movie or Mini-Series - The Company - Nominated
