= Celia Bobak =

British art director

- Born: February 1952 (age 74)
- Occupations: Art director and Set decorator
- Years active: 1981–present

Celia Bobak (born February 1952) is a British art director and set decorator. She has been nominated for two Academy Awards. She worked as the set decorator for Ridley Scott’s “Exodus: Gods and Kings.”

== Academy Awards ==
Both nominations were for Best Production Design:

- 77th Academy Awards – The Phantom of the Opera (shared with Anthony D. G. Pratt)
- 88th Academy Awards – The Martian (shared with Arthur Max)
