= Richard Macdonald =

British production designer (1919-1993)

- Born: 1 June 1919; Yeovil, Somerset, England
- Died: 29 May 1993 (aged 73); Los Angeles, California, U.S.
- Education: UWE Bristol; Royal College of Art
- Occupation: Production designer
- Years active: 1954–1993
- Spouse: Ruth Myers (before 1993)

Richard Macdonald (1 June 1919 – 29 May 1993) was a British film production designer, best known for his work with director Joseph Losey. He was nominated for the BAFTA Award for Best Production Design three times: for King and Country (1964), The Day of the Locust (1975), and The Addams Family (1991).

== Life and career ==
Macdonald was born in Yeovil and studied painting at the West of England College of Art in Bristol from 1937, continuing his education at the Royal College of Art in 1939. He subsequently held teaching posts at Leeds College of Art and at the Camberwell School of Arts and Crafts from 1951 to 1955. Macdonald exhibited his artworks, both in solo shows and in group exhibitions with the London Group, the New English Art Club and at the Royal Academy. The Royal West of England Academy in Bristol holds examples of his paintings.

=== Production designer ===
From the mid-1950s he was involved in film production design. Beginning with 1954's The Sleeping Tiger, he had a fruitful collaboration with director Joseph Losey, which lasted until 1975's Galileo.

In the mid-1970s, he relocated to Hollywood, working on various American productions including The Day of the Locust (1975), Marathon Man (1976), The Rose (1979), Altered States (1980), Something Wicked This Way Comes (1983), Coming to America (1988), and The Addams Family (1991). His last film credit was Sydney Pollack's The Firm (1993).

== Personal life ==
Macdonald was married to costume designer Ruth Myers (b. 1940). The couple had an adopted daughter.

=== Death ===
Aged 73, Macdonald died of cancer in Los Angeles on 29 May 1993. At the time, he was designing sets for a stage production of Scenes from an Execution at the Mark Taper Forum.

Macdonald was posthumously inducted into the Art Directors Guild Hall of Fame in 2013.

== Partial filmography ==
- Time Without Pity (1957)
- The Gypsy and the Gentleman (1958)
- The Criminal (1960)
- Eva (1962)
- The Damned (1963)
- The Servant (1963)
- Modesty Blaise (1966)
- Far from the Madding Crowd (1967)
- Secret Ceremony (1968)
- Boom! (1968)
- Bloomfield (1971)
- The Assassination of Trotsky (1972)
- Jesus Christ Superstar (1973)
- Galileo (1975)
- The Romantic Englishwoman (1975)
- The Day of the Locust (1975)
- Marathon Man (1976)
- Exorcist II (1977)
- F.I.S.T (1978)
- ...And Justice for All. (1979)
- The Rose (1979)
- Altered States (1980)
- Cannery Row (1982)
- Something Wicked This Way Comes (1983)
- Supergirl (1984)
- Electric Dreams (1984)
- Teachers (1984)
- Plenty (1985)
- SpaceCamp (1986)
- Coming to America (1988)
- The Russia House (1990)
- The Addams Family (1991)
- Jennifer Eight (1992)
- The Firm (1993)

== Awards and nominations ==
Institution	Year	Category	Work	Result	Ref.
British Academy Film Award	1965	Best British Art Direction (Black-and-White)	King and Country	Nominated	
British Academy Film Award	1976	Best Art Direction	The Day of the Locust	Nominated	
British Academy Film Award	1992	Best Production Design	The Addams Family	Nominated	

== Bibliography ==
- Colin Gardner. Joseph Losey. Manchester University Press, 2004.
