= Stephen Altman =

American production designer

- Born: October 15, 1956 (age 68); Kansas City, Missouri, U.S.
- Occupation: Production designer
- Parent: Robert Altman (father)

Stephen Altman (born October 15, 1956) is an American production designer. He was nominated for an Academy Award in the category Best Production Design for the film Gosford Park. He is the son of American filmmaker Robert Altman.

== Selected filmography ==
- Gosford Park (2001; co-nominated with Anna Pinnock)
