= Mark Friedberg =

Mark Friedberg is an American production designer and second unit director, known for his collaborations with filmmakers such as Ang Lee, Todd Haynes, Jim Jarmusch, Wes Anderson, and Darren Aronofsky.

A native of Springs, New York, Friedberg was the son of landscape architect M. Paul Friedberg. He attended Brown University, graduating in 1985. He was friends with fellow Brown student Randall Poster.

Friedberg's notable credits include on the films Far from Heaven (2002), Across the Universe (2007), Noah (2014), and Joker (2019), the latter of which earning Friedberg nominations for the BAFTA Award and Critics' Choice Movie Award. Friedberg would return to work on Joker: Folie à Deux (2024), and additionally served as an executive producer on the film.

In television, Friedberg worked on the HBO miniseries Mildred Pierce, winning the Creative Arts Emmy Award for Outstanding Art Direction for a Miniseries or Movie.

== Filmography ==
=== Film ===
Year	Title	Director	Notes
1988	Comedy's Dirtiest Dozen	Lenny Wong	
1990	A Matter of Degrees	W.T. Morgan	
1992	In the Soup	Alexandre Rockwell	
1993	The Ballad of Little Jo	Maggie Greenwald	
1995	The Perez Family	Mira Nair	
1996	Kama Sutra: A Tale of Love	Mira Nair	
1996	I'm Not Rappaport	Herb Gardner	
1997	The Ice Storm	Ang Lee	
1999	Runaway Bride	Garry Marshall	
1999	Ride with the Devil	Ang Lee	
2000	Autumn in New York	Joan Chen	
2000	Pollock	Ed Harris	
2001	Kate & Leopold	James Mangold	
2002	Far from Heaven	Todd Haynes	
2003	Identity	James Mangold	
2003	Coffee and Cigarettes	Jim Jarmusch	
2004	The Life Aquatic with Steve Zissou	Wes Anderson	
2005	Broken Flowers	Jim Jarmusch	
2005	The Producers	Susan Stroman	
2007	The Darjeeling Limited	Wes Anderson	
2007	Across the Universe	Julie Taymor	
2008	Synecdoche, New York	Charlie Kaufman	
2009	Tenderness	John Polson	
2009	State of Play	Kevin Macdonald	
2010	The Tempest	Julie Taymor	
2010	Morning Glory	Roger Michell	
2011	The Beaver	Jodie Foster	
2011	New Year's Eve	Garry Marshall	
2014	Noah	Darren Aronofsky	
2014	The Amazing Spider-Man 2	Marc Webb	
2014	Selma	Ava DuVernay	
2016	Paterson	Jim Jarmusch	Also second unit director
2016	Billy Lynn's Long Halftime Walk	Ang Lee	
2017	Wonderstruck	Todd Haynes	Also second unit director
2017	The Upside	Neil Burger	Also second unit director
2018	If Beale Street Could Talk	Barry Jenkins	
2019	Joker	Todd Phillips	
2022	The Whale	Darren Aronofsky	
2024	Joker: Folie à Deux	Todd Phillips	Also executive producer
2024	Mufasa: The Lion King	Barry Jenkins	
2025	Highest 2 Lowest	Spike Lee	
2025	Father Mother Sister Brother	Jim Jarmusch	
2025	Caught Stealing	Darren Aronofsky	
2027	The Take †	Fernando Meirelles	Post-production

=== Television ===
Year	Title	Notes
1992	The Adventures of Pete & Pete	2 episodes
1998	Sex and the City	1 episode
2011	Mildred Pierce	Miniseries, 5 episodes
2021	The Underground Railroad	Miniseries, 10 episodes Also second unit director
