= Stephenie McMillan =

British set decorator (1942–2013)

- Born: Stephenie Lesley Gardner; 20 July 1942; Ilford, Essex, England
- Died: 19 August 2013 (aged 71); Weston Longville, Norfolk, England
- Occupation: Set decorator
- Years active: 1984–2012
- Known for: The English Patient; Harry Potter
- Spouses: Russell Miller (m. 1963, divorced); Ian McMillan (m. 1978, divorced)
- Partner(s): Phil Hardy (c. 1993–2013; her death)
- Children: 2

Stephenie Lesley McMillan (née Gardner; 20 July 1942 – 19 August 2013) was a British set decorator.

== Background ==
Born in Ilford, Essex, on 20 July 1942, but raised in Chigwell, she graduated from the Woodford County High School for Girls. She worked as a secretary in offices of Stillman & Eastwick-Field, a London-based architecture firm.

== Career ==
McMillan was a set decorator for advertisements before moving into film in the 1980s. She was best known for working on all the Harry Potter films.

She received three Academy Award nominations for the first, fourth, and seventh films, as well as a BAFTA and Critics Choice Award nomination for the eighth in the series, which went on to win the American Art Directors Guild's Contribution to Cinematic Imagery in 2012.

Between the years 1984 and 2012, she worked as set decorator on 28 films. 16 of these were in collaboration with noted production designer Stuart Craig, including A Fish Called Wanda (1988), Shadowlands (1993), The English Patient (1996), for which she won an Oscar, Chocolat (2000) and all of the eight Harry Potter films. Her last film was the Coen brothers-scripted Gambit (2012).

McMillan excelled at handling the decoration of large sets. In a February 2011 interview, she said: "I have been so lucky to have had the opportunity to dress these brilliant and huge sets [for the Harry Potter series] with enough time and money to do it properly, so I feel I don't really have any excuse for not getting it right. To have a set that is right for the director and makes the actors feel comfortable, that's really what I strive for."

After completing the Harry Potter film series, McMillan and Craig collaborated on the designs for the Harry Potter theme park in Orlando, Florida, and 'The Magical World of Harry Potter', which Warner built at its studios at Leavesden, Hertfordshire, which opened in April 2012. Thomas Welsh, a former President of the Art Director's Guild, told the Los Angeles Times: "An eye for even the smallest details—and an understanding of how they swayed the story line — set her body of work apart." McMillan likened winning her Oscar "to being elevated to the peerage".

== Personal life and death ==
In 1963, she married Russell Miller. The couple had two children and later divorced. In 1978, she married Ian McMillan. After their divorce, she began a relationship with writer Phil Hardy, which lasted twenty years.

McMillan died at her home in Weston Longville, Norfolk, from complications of ovarian cancer, on 19 August 2013, aged 71.

== See also ==
- List of Academy Award winners and nominees from Great Britain
