= Geoffrey Unsworth =

British cinematographer (1914–1978)

Geoffrey Unsworth OBE
- Born: Geoffrey Gilyard Unsworth; 26 May 1914; Atherton, Lancashire, England
- Died: 28 October 1978 (aged 64); Paris, France
- Occupation: Cinematographer
- Years active: 1939–1978

Geoffrey Gilyard Unsworth (26 May 1914 – 28 October 1978) was a British cinematographer who worked on nearly ninety feature films during a career that wound up spanning over more than forty years. He is best known for his work on critically acclaimed releases such as Stanley Kubrick's 2001: A Space Odyssey, Bob Fosse's Cabaret and Richard Donner's Superman.

The British news agency The Guardian has highlighted the nature of his work for Kubrick, in the words of fellow cinematographer Peter Suschitzky, given that Unsworth's approach reportedly "became the benchmark" for a given cinematic style. Suschitzky added specifically that he had initially turned down working for filmmaker George Lucas (on the original Star Wars movie) and had "said straight away" to Lucas: "You don’t really want me, you want Geoffrey Unsworth."

== Career ==
Unsworth began his career working at Gaumont British from 1932 to 1937. Having joined Technicolor in 1938, he acted as assistant director of photography on many notable productions, such as Powell and Pressburger's The Life and Death of Colonel Blimp (1943), A Matter of Life and Death (1946) and Scott of the Antarctic (1948). After working on some of the Gainsborough melodramas, he worked at the Rank Organisation throughout the 1950s, notably on films such as A Town Like Alice and A Night to Remember.

In the 1960s, Unsworth's work extended abroad, such as with the 1962 CinemaScope epic The 300 Spartans; the decade also saw him receive his first Academy Award nomination for his work on 1964's Becket. In 1965, he was responsible for photographing the Royal National Theatre's production of William Shakespeare's Othello.

His film work brought him an impressive array of awards, including five British Society of Cinematographers awards, three BAFTAS and two Academy Awards. Unsworth was especially in demand as cinematographer in two very different genres, period pieces and science fiction. Among the highlights of his career, he collaborated with Stanley Kubrick on the visually innovative 2001: A Space Odyssey (on which he was assisted by John Alcott, who would become a regular collaborator of Kubrick's) and Bob Fosse's dark musical exploration of the end of Weimar Germany, Cabaret. In Sidney Lumet's 1974 film adaptation of Agatha Christie's Murder on the Orient Express, his lighting and use of diffusion capture the danger and romance of the train while graceful integration of camera movement and optical effects contributes to the realism of the set while controlling the claustrophobia of the setting.

Unsworth's work reached its widest audience with Richard Donner's Superman in 1978. He was responsible for integrating the work of a who's-who of cinematographers and visual effects designers (including Zoran Perisic, an animation stand crew member from 2001, who extended Kubrick's front projection technique for Superman), with the plausibility and sense of grandeur befitting a (mostly) reverent take on a superhero. The style he developed alongside director Donner was essentially that of a science-fiction period film; the glamorous, often highly diffused cinematography observed a panoply of images of Americana, suggesting an epic timeframe for the film's scenes, a mythical America somewhere between the 1930s of the original comics and the 1970s. The style of the sequences that did not involve extensive science-fiction elements had to match scenes displaying Superman's powers.

Unsworth's other work in the 1970s included the Oliver Cromwell biopic Cromwell in 1970, the 1972 John Barry musical Alice's Adventures in Wonderland, John Boorman's 1974 fantasy film Zardoz, The Return of the Pink Panther (the fourth film in Blake Edwards' Pink Panther series), Richard Attenborough's 1977 war epic A Bridge Too Far. In 1981, he won a posthumous Oscar for Best Cinematography for his collaborative work with Ghislain Cloquet on Roman Polanski's Tess.

For Superman, Unsworth was not named in the Special Achievement in Visual Effects Academy Award the film received, but instead as director of photography, and without a separate credit for special effects work, he would not have been eligible. Donner expressed great disgust that the Academy of Motion Picture Arts and Sciences did not recognise Unsworth with a nomination for Best Achievement in Cinematography in 1979.

== Personal life and death ==
Unsworth became an Officer of the Order of the British Empire in 1976.

He died of a heart attack in France at the age of 64 while filming Roman Polanski's Tess in 1978. Both Superman and The First Great Train Robbery, released in the United Kingdom in December 1978, were dedicated to Unsworth's memory.

Unsworth was admired for his charming manner. Margot Kidder was flattered when Unsworth arranged lighting for her shots, and insisted on concentration by saying "Quiet, I'm lighting the Lady."

Unsworth's wife Maggie worked in the British film industry, often as a script/continuity supervisor.

== Filmography ==
=== Short film ===
Year	Title	Director	Notes
1946	Make Fruitful the Land	Ken Annakin	
1950	Mr. Know-All	Ken Annakin	Segments of Trio
1950	Verger, The	Ken Annakin	Segments of Trio
1955	Cyril Stapleton and the Show Band	Michael Carreras	With Walter J. Harvey
1955	The Eric Winstone Bandshow	Michael Carreras	
1956	Eric Winstone's Stagecoach	Michael Carreras	

Documentary short

Year	Title	Director
1942	Teeth of Steel	Ronald H. Riley
1942	Gardens of England	Michael Hankinson
1942	World Garden	Robin Carruthers
1943	Power on the Land: The Story of the Mechanisation of British Farming	Ralph Keene
1943	The People's Land	Ralph Keene

=== Feature film ===
Year	Title	Director	Notes
1946	Meet the Navy	Alfred Travers	Technicolor photography
1946	The Laughing Lady	Paul L. Stein	
1947	The Man Within	Bernard Knowles	
1947	Jassy	Bernard Knowles	
1948	Blanche Fury	Marc Allégret	Exterior photography
1948	Scott of the Antarctic	Charles Frend	With Osmond Borradaile and Jack Cardiff
1949	The Blue Lagoon	Frank Launder	
1949	Fools Rush In	John Paddy Carstairs	
1949	The Spider and the Fly	Robert Hamer	
1950	Double Confession	Ken Annakin	
1950	The Clouded Yellow	Ralph Thomas	
1951	Where No Vultures Fly	Harry Watt	
1952	Penny Princess	Val Guest	
1952	The Planter's Wife	Ken Annakin	
1952	Made in Heaven	John Paddy Carstairs	
1953	Turn the Key Softly	Jack Lee	
1953	The Sword and the Rose	Ken Annakin	
1954	The Million Pound Note	Ronald Neame	
1954	The Seekers	Ken Annakin	
1954	The Purple Plain	Robert Parrish	
1955	Simba	Brian Desmond Hurst	
1955	Passage Home	Roy Ward Baker	
1955	Value for Money	Ken Annakin	
1956	A Town Like Alice	Jack Lee	
1956	Jacqueline	Roy Ward Baker	
1956	Tiger in the Smoke	Roy Ward Baker	
1957	Hell Drivers	Cy Endfield	
1957	Dangerous Exile	Brian Desmond Hurst	
1958	A Night to Remember	Roy Ward Baker	
1958	Bachelor of Hearts	Wolf Rilla	
1959	Whirlpool	Lewis Allen	
1959	North West Frontier	J. Lee Thompson	
1960	The World of Suzie Wong	Richard Quine	
1961	Don't Bother to Knock	Cyril Frankel	
1962	The Playboy of the Western World	Brian Desmond Hurst	
1962	The 300 Spartans	Rudolph Maté	
1962	The Main Attraction	Daniel Petrie	
1963	Tamahine	Philip Leacock	
1964	Becket	Peter Glenville	
1965	Genghis Khan	Henry Levin	
1965	You Must be Joking	Michael Winner	
1965	Othello	Stuart Burge	
1966	El rey en Londres	Aníbal Uset	With Agustín González Paz and Aníbal González Paz
1967	Oh Dad, Poor Dad, Mamma's Hung You in the Closet and I'm Feelin' So Sad	Richard Quine	
1967	Half a Sixpence	George Sidney	
1968	2001: A Space Odyssey	Stanley Kubrick	
1968	The Bliss of Mrs. Blossom	Joseph McGrath	
1969	The Assassination Bureau	Basil Dearden	
1969	Dance of Death	David Giles	
1969	The Magic Christian	Joseph McGrath	
1970	The Reckoning	Jack Gold	
1970	Cromwell	Ken Hughes	
1970	Goodbye Gemini	Alan Gibson	
1970	Three Sisters	Laurence Olivier; John Sichel	
1971	Say Hello to Yesterday	Alvin Rakoff	
1971	Unman, Wittering and Zigo	John Mackenzie	
1972	Cabaret	Bob Fosse	
1972	Alice's Adventures in Wonderland	William Sterling	
1973	Baxter!	Lionel Jeffries	
1973	Love and Pain and the Whole Damn Thing	Alan J. Pakula	
1973	Voices	Kevin Billington	
1973	Don Quixote	Rudolf Nureyev; Robert Helpmann	
1974	Zardoz	John Boorman	
1974	The Internecine Project	Ken Hughes	
1974	The Abdication	Anthony Harvey	
1974	Murder on the Orient Express	Sidney Lumet	
1975	The Return of the Pink Panther	Blake Edwards	
1975	Royal Flash	Richard Lester	
1975	Lucky Lady	Stanley Donen	
1976	A Matter of Time	Vincente Minnelli	
1977	A Bridge Too Far	Richard Attenborough	
1978	Superman	Richard Donner	
1978	The First Great Train Robbery	Michael Crichton	Also actor (uncredited)
1979	Tess	Roman Polanski	With Ghislain Cloquet (Posthumous release)
1980	Superman II	Richard Lester	With Robert Paynter (Posthumous release)
2006	Superman II: The Richard Donner Cut	Richard Donner	With Robert Paynter (Posthumous release)

Documentary film

Year	Title	Director	Notes
1963	An Evening with the Royal Ballet	Anthony Havelock-Allan; Anthony Asquith	Segments "La Valse", "Les Corsaire" and "Aurora's Wedding"
1965	Pop Gear	Frederic Goode	

=== Television ===
Year	Title	Director	Episode
1956	The Magical World of Disney	Ken Annakin	"When Knighthood Was in Flower" (Part 1 & 2)
1972	Columbo	Richard Quine	"Dagger of the Mind"

== Awards and honours ==
Academy Awards

Year	Category	Title	Result
1964	Best Cinematography	Becket	Nominated
1972	Best Cinematography	Cabaret	Won
1974	Best Cinematography	Murder on the Orient Express	Nominated
1979	Best Cinematography	Tess (shared with Ghislain Cloquet)	Won

BAFTA Awards

Year	Category	Title	Result
1964	Best British Cinematography	Tamahine	Nominated
1965	Best British Cinematography	Becket	Won
1969	Best Cinematography	2001: A Space Odyssey	Won
1973	Best Cinematography	Cabaret, Alice's Adventures in Wonderland	Won
1975	Best Cinematography	Murder on the Orient Express, Zardoz	Nominated
1978	Best Cinematography	A Bridge Too Far	Won
1979	Best Cinematography	Superman	Nominated
1982	Best Cinematography	Tess (shared with Ghislain Cloquet)	Won

National Society of Film Critics

Year	Category	Title	Result
1969	Best Cinematography	2001: A Space Odyssey	3rd place
1972	Best Cinematography	Cabaret	4th place
1981	Best Cinematography	Tess (shared with Ghislain Cloquet)	3rd place
