= Ted Marshall =

British art director

- Occupation: Art director
- Years active: 1945–1975

Ted Marshall was a British art director. He was nominated for two Academy Awards in the category Best Art Direction.

== Selected filmography ==
- The Abominable Snowman (1957)
- Tom Jones (1963)
- The Pumpkin Eater (1964)
- Life at the Top (1965)
- The Spy Who Came in from the Cold (1965)
- The Charge of the Light Brigade (1968)
