= Ernest Archer (art director) =

British art director (1910–1990)

- Born: 26 July 1910
- Died: 27 July 1990 (aged 80)
- Occupation: Art director
- Years active: 1947-1983

Ernest Archer (26 July 1910 – 27 July 1990) was a British art director. He won an Oscar and was nominated for another in the category Best Art Direction.

== Selected filmography ==
Archer won an Academy Award for Best Art Direction and was nominated for another:

Won

- Nicholas and Alexandra (1971)

Nominated

- 2001: A Space Odyssey (1968)
