= Tim Harvey (production designer) =

British production designer

Tim Harvey (born 14 October 1936) is a British production designer of film and television. He has been nominated for an Oscar for his work on Hamlet (1996) with another 5 other award wins and seven nominations.

Harvey worked for RTÉ the Irish State Television Service and then the BBC before moving to film.

== Television credits ==
- I, Claudius (1976)
- Pennies from Heaven (1978)

== Film credits ==
- Henry V (1989)
- Much Ado About Nothing (1993)
- Mary Shelley's Frankenstein (1994)
- In the Bleak Midwinter (1995)
- Othello (1995)
- Hamlet (1996)
- Love's Labour's Lost (2000)
- As You Like It (2006)
- The Magic Flute (2006)
- Sleuth (2007)
