= John Bush (set decorator) =

British set decorator

- Occupation: Set decorator

John Bush is a British set decorator. He was nominated for an Academy Award in the category Best Production Design for the film Topsy-Turvy.

== Selected filmography ==
- Topsy-Turvy (1999; co-nominated with Eve Stewart)
