= Owen Paterson (production designer) =

Australian production designer

Owen Paterson is an Australian production designer, who was chiefly responsible for the design and look of The Matrix series of movies. He grew up in Western Australia, and now resides in Sydney. Following The Matrix, his collaboration with Lana and Lilly Wachowski continued with the films V for Vendetta and Speed Racer.

Prior to working on The Matrix, Paterson had worked on Australian films such as The Adventures of Priscilla, Queen of the Desert with director Stephan Elliott (for which he won an AFI Award) and returned to work with Elliott on Welcome to Woop Woop.

Paterson worked on the 2014 version of Godzilla with director Gareth Edwards. He returned to the franchise on Godzilla vs. Kong in 2021.

In 2015, Paterson was the production designer for Marvel Studios' Captain America: Civil War, and worked for eleven months on the film in Los Angeles, Atlanta and Berlin. After that film's premiere, he called for the Australian government to institute a formal system of film production incentives to attract more big-budget international productions to film in Australia.

Paterson was interviewed in 2008 about his work on creating digital worlds for The Matrix and Speed Racer as part of a short film project that was part of the Australian Centre for the Moving Image's long-running Virtual Worlds exhibition. In 2014, he was one of five film designers interviewed for the documentary series Tomorrow's Worlds: The Unearthly History of Science Fiction, which aired on BBC Two.
