= Beverley Dunn (set decorator) =

Australian set decorator

Beverly Dunn
- Occupation: set decorator
- Years active: 1992-present

Beverley Dunn is an Australian set decorator.

Dunn has served as set decorator in a number of films. Dunn, along with production designer Catherine Martin, won an Academy Award for Best Production Design for the 2013 film The Great Gatsby. Dunn grew up and resides in Sydney. She was educated at Cheltenham Girls High School and University of Western Sydney.
