= Maria Djurkovic =

British film production designer

- Born: April 1960 (age 66); Kensington, London, England
- Education: Ruskin School of Art
- Years active: 1986–present

Maria Djurkovic (born April 1960) is a British production designer for film and television.

== Early life and education ==
Djurkovic was born in West London and grew up in Harrow, North London, the daughter of a Yugoslav-born art director. She has Czech, Russian and Montenegrin roots and spent some of her childhood in former Yugoslavia.

Djurkovic attended St Helen's School, completing her A Levels in 1978. She graduated with a degree in Fine Art from Oxford University's Ruskin School of Art in 1982. She then pursued the Motley Theatre Design Course.

== Career ==
After completing her postgraduate studies, Djurkovic began her career in the mid 1980s working in television for the BBC. Since then she has been involved in around 30 film and television productions.

At the 2015 Academy Awards, she and Tatiana Macdonald were nominated in the Best Production Design category for their work on The Imitation Game. In particular, she was responsible for the reconstruction of Alan Turing's bombe, for which she was given access to the archives of Bletchley Park, where Turing and his colleagues worked on deciphering the German military's Enigma code during the Second World War.

== Filmography ==
=== Television ===
Year	Title	Notes
1986	The Singing Detective	1 episode
1988	East of the Moon	
1992	No Head for Heights	Short film
1993	Spender	2 episodes
1995	Inspector Morse	1 episode
1996	In Your Dreams	Television film
1999	RKO 281	Television film
2002	Doctor Zhivago	Miniseries
2010	The Special Relationship	Television film
2018	The Little Drummer Girl	Miniseries

=== Film ===
Year	Title	Notes
1995	The Turnaround	
1995	The Young Poisoner's Handbook	
1996	Sweet Angel Mine	
1997	Wilde	
1998	Sliding Doors	
1999	Fanny and Elvis	
2000	Billy Elliot	
2001	The Grey Zone	
2002	The Hours	
2003	Sylvia	
2004	Vanity Fair	
2005	Man to Man	
2006	Scoop	
2007	Cassandra's Dream	
2008	Mamma Mia!	
2011	Tinker Tailor Soldier Spy	
2012	I Missed My Mother's Funeral	Short film
2013	The Invisible Woman	
2014	The Imitation Game	
2015	A Bigger Splash	
2016	Gold	
2017	The Snowman	
2018	Red Sparrow	
2021	The Dig	
2022	My Policeman	
2023	Ferrari	
2025	The Amateur	

== Awards ==
- Nominated, Academy Award for Best Production Design for The Imitation Game
- Nominated, BAFTA Award for Best Production Design for The Imitation Game
