= Eve Stewart =

British production designer (born 1961)

- Born: 1961 (age 63–64); London, England
- Occupation: Production designer
- Years active: 1993–present
- Notable work: Topsy-Turvy; The King's Speech; Les Misérables

Eve Stewart (born 1961) is a British production designer. She grew up in Camden Town and later trained in film, originally working in theatre. She later became a set designer, starting with Naked in 1993. In 1999, she received a nomination for an Academy Award for Best Production Design for Topsy-Turvy. She later began a collaboration with director Tom Hooper, working on Elizabeth I, The Damned United, The King's Speech, Les Misérables, and The Danish Girl.

Stewart has won several awards, including a BAFTA Award for Best Production Design, an ADG Excellence in Production Design Award, and a Creative Arts Emmy Award. She has been nominated four times for an Academy Award, with her most recent nomination being in 2016. She also served as production designer for Paul McGuigan's film Victor Frankenstein.

== Early life ==
Eve Stewart was born in London, England in 1961. She grew up in Camden Town. Stewart studied theatre design at Central Saint Martins, and later acquired a Masters in Architecture from the Royal College of Art. Initially, Stewart worked as a theatre designer. Eventually, she did a play for Mike Leigh at the Hampstead Theatre, who then offered her the post of art director for an upcoming project.

== Career ==
Stewart's first film credit was as art director on Leigh's film Naked. She described the experience as "very hard work" and "a bit of a shock". Stewart served as art director on Secrets & Lies and as set designer on Career Girls and Topsy-Turvy; she was nominated for an Academy Award for Best Production Design for her work on the latter, sharing the nomination with set decorator, John Bush. In 2000, Stewart was the set designer for New Year's Day, Saving Grace, and Sorted, while in 2001 she served that position on Goodbye Charlie Bright and The Hole.

Stewart's fourth and final collaboration with Leigh was as production designer on the 2004 film Vera Drake. For her work on the film, she received her first nomination for a BAFTA Award for Best Production Design. Working for the first time with Tom Hooper, Stewart was the production designer on the 2005 television miniseries Elizabeth I, which won her the Creative Arts Emmy Award for Outstanding Art Direction for a Miniseries or TV Movie. In 2008, Stewart served as production designer on the thriller film Fifty Dead Men Walking. For this, she received the Genie Award for Best Achievement in Art Direction/Production Design. In 2009, Stewart worked with Hooper for the second time on The Damned United.

Stewart served as production designer on Hooper's 2010 film The King's Speech. Before working on the film, she researched the settings for the script by viewing old newsreels and touring the Victoria and Albert Museum. Her work on The King's Speech received several award nominations. She won an ADG Excellence in Production Design Award, and has said that it is the award she is the most proud of. Stewart also received a Los Angeles Film Critics Association Award, and was nominated for an Academy Award and a BAFTA Award.

Stewart collaborated with Hooper once more in 2012, when she worked as production designer on Les Misérables. For reference, Stewart followed the film protagonist's route through France. She also visited the house of the story's author, Victor Hugo. Stewart received her third Academy Award nomination for the film, as well as winning a BAFTA Award. She received her first Saturn Award nomination for her work on the film. Stewart was later hired on Muppets Most Wanted and has served as production designer on Paul McGuigan's Victor Frankenstein.

== Filmography ==
Year	Title
1997	Career Girls
1998	Jilting Joe
1999	Topsy-Turvy
2000	Saving Grace
2000	Sorted
2000	New Year's Day
2001	The Hole
2001	Goodbye Charlie Bright
2001	Kiss Kiss Bang Bang
2001	Happy Now
2002	All or Nothing
2002	Nicholas Nickleby
2003	Wondrous Oblivion
2003	Cheeky
2004	De-Lovely
2004	Vera Drake
2005	The Dark
2005	Revolver
2007	The Good Night
2007	Becoming Jane
2008	Wild Child
2008	Fifty Dead Men Walking
2009	The Damned United
2009	The Firm
2010	The King's Speech
2011	Late Bloomers
2012	Les Misérables
2014	Muppets Most Wanted
2015	The Danish Girl
2015	Victor Frankenstein
2016	A Cure for Wellness
2017	Film Stars Don't Die in Liverpool
2018	The Girl in the Spider's Web
2019	Cats
2021	Eternals
2024	Ghostbusters: Frozen Empire
2024	The First Omen
2024	Kraven the Hunter
2025	Nuremberg
