= Peter Lando =

Set Decorator and art director

- Born: Peter Louis Lando
- Other name: Pete Lando
- Occupations: Art director and set decorator
- Years active: 1989-present

Peter Lando is a set decorator, who has some art director credits as well. He is most known for The Dark Knight, for which he was nominated for Best Art Direction at the 81st Academy Awards. He shared his nomination with art director Nathan Crowley.

== Selected filmography ==
- Look Who's Talking Now (1993)
- Far from Home: The Adventures of Yellow Dog (1995)
- The 6th Day (2000)
- The Santa Clause 2 (2002)
- The Chronicles of Riddick (2004)
- Eight Below (2006)
- The Dark Knight (2008)
- Elysium (2013)
- Ender's Game (2013)
- Night at the Museum: Secret of the Tomb (2014)
- Special Correspondents (2016)
- Logan (2017)
- Cold Pursuit (2019)
- Ford v Ferrari (2019)
- Ghostbusters: Afterlife (2020)
