= Nancy Haigh =

American set decorator

- Born: Nancy Grace Haigh; 1946 (age 79–80)
- Education: Massachusetts College of Art
- Occupation: Set decorator
- Years active: 1983–present

Nancy Grace Haigh (born 1946) is an American set decorator who has received nine Academy Award nominations, and won two for her work on the films Bugsy, and Once Upon a Time in Hollywood.

== Biography ==
Nancy Haigh graduated in 1968 from Massachusetts College of Art (MassArt) with a BFA degree in ceramics. In 1995, the college honored her with a Distinguished Alumna Award.

Nancy began her career in film with Francis Ford Coppola's film Rumble Fish in 1983. Since then, Nancy has been the set decorator for numerous movies in collaboration with the Coen brothers.

== Filmography ==
Year	Film	Director	Awards	Notes
1989	Earth Girls Are Easy	Julien Temple		
1989	Field of Dreams	Phil Alden Robinson		
1989	Checking Out	David Leland		
1990	The Grifters	Stephen Frears		
1990	Miller's Crossing	Joel Coen		
1991	Guilty by Suspicion	Irwin Winkler		
1991	Barton Fink	Joel Coen	Nominated – Academy Award for Best Art Decoration	
1991	Bugsy	Barry Levinson	Academy Award for Best Art Decoration	
1992	Hero	Stephen Frears		
1994	The Hudsucker Proxy	Joel & Ethan Coen		
1994	Forrest Gump	Robert Zemeckis	Nominated – Academy Award for Best Art Decoration	
1995	Waterworld	Kevin Reynolds		
1996	Mars Attacks!	Tim Burton		
1998	Fear & Loathing in Las Vegas	Terry Gilliam		
1998	The Truman Show	Peter Weir	Nominated – Online Film & Television Association Award for Best Production Design	
1999	The Insider	Michael Mann		
2000	O Brother, Where Art Thou?	Joel & Ethan Coen		
2001	A.I. Artificial Intelligence	Steven Spielberg	Nominated – Online Film & Television Association Award for Best Production Design	
2002	Road to Perdition	Sam Mendes	Nominated – Academy Award for Best Art Decoration	
2003	Intolerable Cruelty	Joel & Ethan Coen		
2003	Big Fish	Tim Burton		
2004	The Ladykillers	Joel & Ethan Coen		
2005	Jarhead	Sam Mendes		
2006	Ask the Dust	Robert Towne		
2006	Dreamgirls	Bill Condon	Nominated – Academy Award for Best Art Decoration; Nominated – Satellite Award for Best Art Direction and Production Design; Nominated – Online Film & Television Association Award for Best Production Design	
2007	No Country for Old Men	Joel & Ethan Coen		
2007	Charlie Wilson's War	Mike Nichols		
2008	Burn After Reading	Joel & Ethan Coen		
2010	True Grit	Joel & Ethan Coen	Nominated – Academy Award for Best Art Decoration	
2011	Moneyball	Bennett Miller		
2013	Oz the Great and Powerful	Sam Raimi		
2013	August: Osage County	John Wells		
2016	Hail, Caesar!	Joel & Ethan Coen	Nominated – Academy Award for Best Production Design	
2016	Café Society	Woody Allen		
2016	Rules Don't Apply	Warren Beatty		
2016	Live by Night	Ben Affleck		
2018	The Ballad of Buster Scruggs	Joel & Ethan Coen		
2019	Once Upon a Time in Hollywood	Quentin Tarantino	Academy Award for Best Production Design	
2020	A Quiet Place: Part II	John Krasinski		
2021	The Tragedy of Macbeth	Joel Coen	Nominated – Academy Award for Best Production Design	
2022	The Gray Man	Anthony & Joe Russo		
