= John Myhre =

American production designer (born 1959)

- Born: 1959 (age 66–67)
- Occupation: Production designer
- Years active: 1984-present

John Myhre (born 1959) is an American production designer who has been working in Hollywood since the late 1980s.

He received his first Academy Award nomination, for Best Art Direction, in 1998, for Shekhar Kapur's Elizabeth, bringing him to the forefront of Hollywood production designers. His credits have included X-Men, Ali and The Haunted Mansion. He is also a frequent collaborator of director Rob Marshall, working on the films Chicago, Memoirs of a Geisha, Nine, Pirates of the Caribbean: On Stranger Tides and Mary Poppins Returns with the former two winning him the Academy Award for Best Art Direction.

Myhre's production design was also seen in 2006 on Bill Condon's Dreamgirls, which was also nominated for an Academy Award for Best Art Direction.

== Academy Awards nominations & wins ==
1998: Nominated for Elizabeth

2002: Won for Chicago.

2005: Won for Memoirs of a Geisha

2006: Nominated for Dreamgirls

2009: Nominated for Nine

2018: Nominated for Mary Poppins Returns
