= John Bryan (art director) =

English art director and film producer (1911–1969)

Eric John Bryan Pratt (12 August 1911 – 10 June 1969), known professionally as John Bryan, was a British art director and film producer.

John Bryan was born in Kensington, London, England. He won the Oscar for Best Art Direction for the film Great Expectations in 1948. He was nominated twice more, for Caesar and Cleopatra in 1947 and for Becket in 1965. Bryan also won a BAFTA for Becket.

In 1959, he was a member of the jury at the 9th Berlin International Film Festival.

He died from cancer at a hospital in Thames Ditton, Surrey, on 10 June 1969.

== Filmography ==
=== Art director ===
- Colonel Blood (1934)
- Murder by Rope (1936)
- Hearts of Humanity (1936)
- The Captain's Table (1936)
- Men of Yesterday (1936)
- Things to Come (1936, assistant)
- The Song of the Road (1937)
- The Last Curtain (1937)
- Talking Feet (1937)
- Stepping Toes (1938)
- Pygmalion (1938)
- Inspector Hornleigh (1939)
- On the Night of the Fire (1939)
- Stolen Life (1939)
- The Spider (1940)
- Major Barbara (1941)
- Dangerous Moonlight (1941)
- King Arthur Was a Gentleman (1942)
- Dear Octopus (1943)
- Millions Like Us (1943)
- The Adventures of Tartu (1943)
- Time Flies (1944)
- Fanny by Gaslight (1944)
- Love Story (1944)
- Two Thousand Women (1944)
- The Wicked Lady (1945)
- Caesar and Cleopatra (1945)
- The Magic Bow (1946)
- Caravan (1946)
- Great Expectations (1946)
- The Root of All Evil (1947)
- Take My Life (1947)
- Blanche Fury (1948)
- Oliver Twist (1948)
- The Passionate Friends (1949)
- Madeleine (1950)
- Golden Salamander (1950)
- Pandora and the Flying Dutchman (1951)
- The Magic Box (1951)
- Becket (1964)
- Great Catherine (1968)

=== Producer ===
- The Card (1952)
- The Million Pound Note (1954)
- The Purple Plain (1954)
- The Spanish Gardener (1956)
- The Secret Place (1957)
- Windom's Way (1957)
- The Horse's Mouth (1958)
- There Was a Crooked Man (1960)
- The Girl on the Boat (1962)
- Tamahine (1963)
- After the Fox (1966)
- The Touchables (1968)
