= Anthony D. G. Pratt =

British production designer

- Born: England
- Occupation: Production designer
- Years active: 1974–present

Anthony D. G. Pratt is an English production designer, known for his work on the film Hope and Glory (1988).

== Recognition and awards ==
Pratt is an honorary member of the British Film Designers Guild.

Pratt was nominated for two Oscars, one for Hope and Glory and the other for The Phantom of the Opera.

In addition he has won two Emmy awards, for Rome and The Pacific.

== Family ==
Pratt is the greatgnephew of William Henry Pratt, better known as Boris Karloff, and the nephew of actress Gillian Pratt (a.k.a. Gillian Lind).

== Filmography ==
- The Night Digger (1971)
- Excalibur (1981)
- Hope and Glory (1987)
- Naked Tango (1991)
- Michael Collins (1996)
- The Man in the Iron Mask (1998)
- Grey Owl (1999)
- The End of the Affair (1999)
- Band of Brothers (2001) (mini) TV Series
- The Good Thief (2002)
- The Phantom of the Opera (2004)
