= Maurice Carter (production designer) =

British production designer (1913–2000)

Maurice Carter (24 April 1913 – April 2000) was a British production designer.

== Early life ==
Maurice Carter was born on 24 April 1913 in London, England.

== Career and accolades ==
Carter was one of the first in England to use back projection.

He also founded the Guild of Film Art Directors, a.k.a. British Film Designers Guild.

He was nominated for two Oscars and three BAFTAs.

He died in April 2000.

== Selected films ==
- Good-Time Girl (1948)
- Christopher Columbus (1949)
- Always a Bride (1953)
- Desperate Moment (1953)
- The Spanish Gardener (1957)
- Anne of the Thousand Days (1969)
- The Land That Time Forgot (1975)
- The People that Time Forgot (1977)
- The First Great Train Robbery (1978)
