= Anna Pinnock =

Set decorator

Anna Pinnock is a set decorator. She has been nominated six times for an Academy Award for Art Direction or Production Design:

- Gosford Park (2001) – Nominated
- The Golden Compass (2007) – Nominated
- Life of Pi (2012) – Nominated
- The Grand Budapest Hotel (2014) – Winner
- Into the Woods (2014) – Nominated
- Fantastic Beasts and Where to Find Them (2016) – Nominated

Pinnock has worked on three James Bond films: Quantum of Solace, Skyfall, and Spectre.
