= Primetime Emmy Award for Outstanding Production Design for a Narrative Period or Fantasy Program (One Hour or More) =

Television award category

Primetime Emmy Award for Production Design for a Narrative Period or Fantasy Program (One Hour or More)
- Awarded for: Outstanding Production Design for a Narrative Period or Fantasy Program (One Hour or More)
- Country: United States
- Presented by: Academy of Television Arts & Sciences
- Currently held by: Fallout (2026)
- Website: emmys.com

The Primetime Emmy Award for Outstanding Production Design for a Narrative Period or Fantasy Program (One Hour or More) is an award handed out annually at the Creative Arts Emmy Awards.

In 2014, the category was created alongside Outstanding Production Design for a Narrative Program (Half-Hour or Less) and Outstanding Production Design for a Narrative Contemporary Program (One Hour or More). From 2014 to 2017, contemporary and fantasy programs competed together. Fantasy programs compete alongside period programs since 2018. Prior to this, awards were given to single-camera series and miniseries or movies.

== Winners and Nominees ==
=== 2010s ===
Year	Program	Episode(s)	Nominees	Network
2010 (62nd)	Art Direction for a Miniseries or Movie			
2010 (62nd)	The Pacific		Anthony Pratt, Dominic Hyman, Richard Hobbs, Scott Bird, Jim Millett, Rolland Pike, Lisa Thompson	HBO
2010 (62nd)	Georgia O'Keeffe		Stephen Altman, John Bucklin, Helen Britten	Lifetime
2010 (62nd)	Return to Cranford		Donal Woods, Mark Kebby, Trisha Edwards	PBS
2010 (62nd)	Temple Grandin		Richard Hoover, Meghan C. Rogers, Gabriella Villarreal	HBO
2010 (62nd)	You Don't Know Jack		Mark Ricker, Amy Fritz, Rena DeAngelo	HBO
2010 (62nd)	Art Direction for a Single-Camera Series			
2010 (62nd)	The Tudors	"Sixth and the Final Wife"	Tom Conroy, Colman Corish, Crispian Sallis	Showtime
2010 (62nd)	Glee	"Pilot"	Mark Hutman, Christopher Brown, Barbara Munch	Fox
2010 (62nd)	Heroes	"Brave New World"	Ruth Ammon, Sandy Getzler, Ron Franco	NBC
2010 (62nd)	Lost	"Ab Aeterno"	Zack Grobler, Matthew C. Jacobs, Carol Bayne Kelley	ABC
2010 (62nd)	Modern Family	"Moon Landing," "Fears"	Richard Berg, Amber Haley	ABC
2010 (62nd)	True Blood	"Never Let Me Go," "I Will Rise Up," "Frenzy"	Suzuki Ingerslev, Catherine Smith, Laura Richarz	HBO
2011 (63rd)	Art Direction for a Miniseries or Movie			
2011 (63rd)	Mildred Pierce		Mark Friedberg, Peter Rogness, Ellen Christiansen	HBO
2011 (63rd)	Downton Abbey		Donal Woods, Charmian Adams, Gina Cromwell	PBS
2011 (63rd)	The Kennedys		Rocco Matteo, Mun Ying Kwun, Enrico Campana	Reelz
2011 (63rd)	Upstairs Downstairs		Eve Stewart, David Hindle, Julia Castle	PBS
2011 (63rd)	Art Direction for a Single-Camera Series			
2011 (63rd)	Boardwalk Empire	"Boardwalk Empire"	Bob Shaw, Doug Huszti, Debra Schutt	HBO
2011 (63rd)	The Borgias	"Lucrezia's Wedding"	François Séguin, Jonathan McKinstry, Judit Varga	Showtime
2011 (63rd)	Mad Men	"Public Relations"	Dan Bishop, Christopher Brown, Claudette Didul	AMC
2011 (63rd)	Modern Family	"Halloween"	Richard Berg, Amber Haley	ABC
2011 (63rd)	True Blood	"Beautifully Broken"	Suzuki Ingerslev, Catherine Smith, Laura Richarz	HBO
2012 (64th)	Art Direction for a Miniseries or Movie			
2012 (64th)	Great Expectations		David Roger, Paul Ghirardani, Jo Kornstein	PBS
2012 (64th)	American Horror Story	"Open House"	Mark Worthington, Edward L. Rubin, Ellen Brill	FX
2012 (64th)	American Horror Story	"Pilot"	Beth Rubino, Charles M. Lagola, Ellen Brill	FX
2012 (64th)	Hatfields & McCoys		Derek R. Hill, Serban Porupca, John B. Vertrees, Sally Black	History
2012 (64th)	Hemingway & Gellhorn		Geoffrey Kirkland, Nanci Noblett, Jim Erickson	HBO
2012 (64th)	Sherlock: A Scandal in Belgravia		Arwel Jones, Dafydd Shurmer, Joelle Rumbelow	PBS
2012 (64th)	Art Direction for a Single-Camera Series			
2012 (64th)	Boardwalk Empire	"Peg of Old," "Battles of the Century," "To the Lost"	Bill Groom, Adam Scher, Carol Silverman	HBO
2012 (64th)	Game of Thrones	"Garden of Bones," "The Ghost of Harrenhal," "A Man Without Honor"	Gemma Jackson, Frank Walsh, Tina Jones	HBO
2012 (64th)	Downton Abbey	"Episode 4"	Donal Woods, Charmian Adams, Judy Farr	PBS
2012 (64th)	Justified	"Cut Ties"	Dave Blass, Oana Bogdan Miller, Shauna Aronson	FX
2012 (64th)	Mad Men	"At the Codfish Ball"	Dan Bishop, Christopher Brown, Claudette Didul	AMC
2013 (65th)	Art Direction for a Miniseries or Movie			
2013 (65th)	Behind the Candelabra		Howard Cummings, Patrick M. Sullivan Jr., Barbara Munch	HBO
2013 (65th)	American Horror Story: Asylum	"I Am Anne Frank, Part 2"	Mark Worthington, Andrew Murdock, Ellen Brill	FX
2013 (65th)	American Horror Story: Asylum	"Welcome to Briarcliff"	Mark Worthington, Edward L. Rubin, Ellen Brill	FX
2013 (65th)	Phil Spector		Patrizia von Brandenstein, Fredda Slavin, Diane Lederman	HBO
2013 (65th)	Seal Team Six: The Raid on Osama Bin Laden		Guy Barnes, Rosario Provenza, Wendy Ozols-Barnes	Nat Geo
2013 (65th)	Art Direction for a Single-Camera Series			
2013 (65th)	Boardwalk Empire	"Sunday Best," "Two Imposters," "Margate Sands"	Bill Groom, Adam Scher, Carol Silverman	HBO
2013 (65th)	The Borgias	"Siblings"	Jonathan McKinstry, Adam O'Neill, Judit Varga	Showtime
2013 (65th)	Downton Abbey	"Episode 7"	Donal Woods, Mark Kebby, Gina Cromwell	PBS
2013 (65th)	Game of Thrones	"Valar Dohaeris," "Kissed by Fire"	Gemma Jackson, Andy Thomson, Rob Cameron	HBO
2013 (65th)	True Blood	"Whatever I Am, You Made Me," "Let's Boot and Rally," "Sunset"	Suzuki Ingerslev, Catherine Smith, Ron Franco	HBO
2014 (66th)	Production Design for a Narrative Contemporary or Fantasy Program (One Hour or More)			
2014 (66th)	Game of Thrones	"The Laws of Gods and Men," "The Mountain and the Viper"	Deborah Riley, Paul Ghirardani, Rob Cameron	HBO
2014 (66th)	House of Cards	"Chapter 18," "Chapter 24"	Steve Arnold, Halina Gebarowicz, Tiffany Zappulla	Netflix
2014 (66th)	Justified	"A Murder of Crowes," "Wrong Roads," "The Toll"	Dave Blass, Oana Bogdan, Shauna Aronson	FX
2014 (66th)	True Blood	"At Last," "Fuck the Pain Away," "In the Evening"	Suzuki Ingerslev, Cat Smith, Ron V. Franco	HBO
2014 (66th)	True Detective	"Seeing Things," "The Locked Room," "Form and Void"	Alex DiGerlando, Mara LePere-Schloop, Tim Beach, Cynthia Slagter	HBO
2014 (66th)	Outstanding Production Design for a Narrative Period Program (One Hour or More)			
2014 (66th)	Boardwalk Empire	"Erlkönig," "The Old Ship of Zion," "Farewell Daddy Blues"	Bill Groom, Adam Scher, Carol Silverman	HBO
2014 (66th)	American Horror Story: Coven		Mark Worthington, Andrew Murdock, Ellen Brill	FX
2014 (66th)	Downton Abbey	"Episode 8"	Donal Woods, Mark Kebby, Gina Cromwell	PBS
2014 (66th)	Mad Men	"Time Zones"	Dan Bishop, Shanna Starzyk, Claudette Didul	AMC
2014 (66th)	Masters of Sex	"Pilot"	Andrew Jackness, Kevin Rupnik, Ellen Christiansen	Showtime
2015 (67th)	Production Design for a Narrative Contemporary or Fantasy Program (One Hour or More)			
2015 (67th)	Game of Thrones	"High Sparrow," "Unbowed, Unbent, Unbroken," "Hardhome"	Deborah Riley, Paul Ghirardani, Rob Cameron	HBO
2015 (67th)	Constantine	"The Darkness Beneath," "Feast of Friends," "The Saint of Last Resorts, Part 1"	Dave Blass, Hugo Santiago, Drew Monahan, Natali Pope	NBC
2015 (67th)	Gotham	"Pilot"	Doug Kraner, Laura Ballinger Gardner, Regina Graves	Fox
2015 (67th)	House of Cards	"Chapter 29," "Chapter 36"	Steve Arnold, Halina Gebarowicz, Tiffany Zappulla	Netflix
2015 (67th)	True Blood	"Jesus Gonna Be Here," "I Found You," "Fire in the Hole"	Suzuki Ingerslev, Cat Smith, Ron V. Franco	HBO
2015 (67th)	Outstanding Production Design for a Narrative Period Program (One Hour or More)			
2015 (67th)	Boardwalk Empire	"Golden Days for Boys and Girls"	Bill Groom, Adam Scher, Carol Silverman	HBO
2015 (67th)	The Knick	"Method and Madness"	Howard Cummings, Henry Dunn, Regina Graves	Cinemax
2015 (67th)	Downton Abbey	"A Moorland Holiday"	Donal Woods, Mark Kebby, Linda Wilson	PBS
2015 (67th)	Mad Men	"Person to Person"	Dan Bishop, Shanna Starzyk, Claudette Didul	AMC
2015 (67th)	Masters of Sex	"Blackbird"	Michael Wylie, Elizabeth H. Gray, Halina Siwolop	Showtime
2016 (68th)	Production Design for a Narrative Contemporary or Fantasy Program (One Hour or More)			
2016 (68th)	Game of Thrones	"Blood of My Blood," "The Broken Man," "No One"	Deborah Riley, Paul Ghirardani, Rob Cameron	HBO
2016 (68th)	American Horror Story: Hotel		Mark Worthington, Denise Hudson, Ellen Brill	FX
2016 (68th)	House of Cards	"Chapter 41," "Chapter 47," "Chapter 48"	Steve Arnold, Halina Gebarowicz, Tiffany Zappulla	Netflix
2016 (68th)	The Man in the High Castle	"The New World"	Drew Boughton, Linda King, Brenda Meyers-Ballard	Amazon
2016 (68th)	Penny Dreadful	"Fresh Hell," "Evil Spirits in Heavenly Places," "And Hell Itself My Only Foe"	Jonathan McKinstry, Jo Riddell, Philip Murphy	Showtime
2016 (68th)	Outstanding Production Design for a Narrative Period Program (One Hour or More)			
2016 (68th)	Downton Abbey	"Episode 5," "Episode 7"	Donal Woods, Mark Kebby, Linda Wilson	PBS
2016 (68th)	Fargo	"Waiting for Dutch"	Warren A. Young, Elisabeth Williams, Shirley Inget	FX
2016 (68th)	The Knick	"Ten Knots," "The Best with the Best to Get the Best," "Wonderful Surprises"	Howard Cummings, Laura Ballinger Gardner, Regina Graves	Cinemax
2016 (68th)	Masters of Sex	"The Excitement of Release," "Surrogates," "Party of Four"	Elizabeth H. Gray, Valerie Green, Halina Siwolop	Showtime
2016 (68th)	Outlander	"Not in Scotland Anymore," "Faith"	Jon Gary Steele, Nicki McCallum, Gina Cromwell	Starz
2017 (69th)	Production Design for a Narrative Contemporary or Fantasy Program (One Hour or More)			
2017 (69th)	The Handmaid's Tale	"Offred"	Julie Berghoff, Evan Webber, Sophie Neudorfer	Hulu
2017 (69th)	Penny Dreadful	"Perpetual Night," "The Blessed Dark"	Jonathan McKinstry, Jo Riddell, Philip Murphy	Showtime
2017 (69th)	Westworld	"The Bicameral Mind"	Zack Grobler, Steve Christensen, Julie Ochipinti	HBO
2017 (69th)	Westworld	"The Original"	Nathan Crowley, Steve Christensen, Julie Ochipinti	HBO
2017 (69th)	The Young Pope		Ludovica Ferrario, Alexandro Maria Santucci, Laura Casalini	HBO
2017 (69th)	Outstanding Production Design for a Narrative Period Program (One Hour or More)			
2017 (69th)	The Crown	"Smoke and Mirrors"	Martin Childs, Mark Raggett, Celia Bobak	Netflix
2017 (69th)	Feud: Bette and Joan		Judy Becker, Jamie McCall, Florencia Martin	FX
2017 (69th)	The Man in the High Castle	"The Tiger's Cave"	Drew Boughton, Dawn Swiderski, Jon Lancaster	Amazon
2017 (69th)	Masters of Sex	"Freefall," "Inventory," "The Pleasure Protocol"	Elizabeth H. Gray, Samantha Englender, Halina Siwolop	Showtime
2017 (69th)	Stranger Things	"Chapter One: The Vanishing of Will Byers"	Chris Trujillo, William Davis, Jess Royal	Netflix
2018 (70th)	Production Design for a Narrative Period or Fantasy Program (One Hour or More)			
2018 (70th)	Game of Thrones	"Dragonstone"	Deborah Riley, Paul Ghirardani, Rob Cameron	HBO
2018 (70th)	The Alienist	"The Boy on the Bridge"	Mara LePere-Schloop, Bill Crutcher, Karl Probert, Alice Baker	TNT
2018 (70th)	The Crown	"Beryl"	Martin Childs, Mark Raggett, Alison Harvey	Netflix
2018 (70th)	The Marvelous Mrs. Maisel	"Ya Shivu v Bolshom Dome Na Kholme"	Bill Groom, Neil Prince, Ellen Christiansen	Prime Video
2018 (70th)	Westworld	"Akane No Mai"	Howard Cummings, David Lazan, Julie Ochipinti	HBO
2019 (71st)
2019 (71st)	Chernobyl		Luke Hull, Karen Wakefield, Claire Levinson-Gendler	HBO
2019 (71st)	Fosse/Verdon		Alex DiGerlando, Anu Schwartz, Lydia Marks	FX
2019 (71st)	Game of Thrones	"The Bells"	Deborah Riley, Paul Ghirardani, Rob Cameron	HBO
2019 (71st)	The Man in the High Castle	"Now More Than Ever, We Care About You"	Drew Boughton, Dean O'Dell, Jonathan Lancaster, Lisa Lancaster	Prime Video
2019 (71st)	The Marvelous Mrs. Maisel	"Simone," "We're Going to the Catskills!"	Bill Groom, Neil Prince, Ellen Christiansen	Prime Video
2019 (71st)	A Series of Unfortunate Events	"Penultimate Peril, Part 1"	Bo Welch, Don MacAulay, Kate Marshall	Netflix

=== 2020s ===
Year	Program	Episode(s)	Nominees	Network
2020 (72nd)
2020 (72nd)	The Crown	"Aberfan"	Martin Childs, Mark Raggett, Alison Harvey	Netflix
2020 (72nd)	Hollywood		Matthew Flood Ferguson, Mark Robert Taylor, Melissa Licht	Netflix
2020 (72nd)	The Marvelous Mrs. Maisel	"It's Comedy or Cabbage", "A Jewish Girl Walks Into the Apollo..."	Bill Groom, Neil Prince, Ellen Christiansen	Prime Video
2020 (72nd)	Watchmen	"An Almost Religious Awe"	Kristian Milsted, Jay Pelissier, Edward McLoughlin	HBO
2020 (72nd)	Westworld	"Parce Domine"	Howard Cummings, Jon Carlos, Julie Ochipinti	HBO
2021 (73rd)
2021 (73rd)	The Queen's Gambit		Uli Hanisch, Kai Karla Koch, Sabine Schaaf	Netflix
2021 (73rd)	Bridgerton	"After the Rain"	Will Hughes-Jones, Dominic Devine, Gina Cromwell	Netflix
2021 (73rd)	The Crown	"War"	Martin Childs, Mark Raggett, Alison Harvey	Netflix
2021 (73rd)	Halston		Mark Ricker, Nithya Shrinivasan, Cherish M. Hale	Netflix
2021 (73rd)	The Mandalorian	"Chapter 13: The Jedi"	Andrew L. Jones, Doug Chiang, David Lazan, Amanda Serino	Disney+
2021 (73rd)	Perry Mason	"Chapter Three"	John Goldsmith, Chris Farmer, Halina Siwolop	HBO
2022 (74th)
2022 (74th)	The Gilded Age	"Never the New"	Bob Shaw, Larry Brown, Laura Ballinger Gardner, Regina Graves	HBO
2022 (74th)	The Great	"Wedding"	Francesca di Mottola, Emma Painter, Monica Alberte	Hulu
2022 (74th)	Loki	"Glorious Purpose"	Kasra Farahani, Natasha Gerasimova, Claudia Bonfe	Disney+
2022 (74th)	The Marvelous Mrs. Maisel	"Maisel vs. Lennon: The Cut Contest", "How Do You Get to Carnegie Hall?"	Bill Groom, Neil Prince, Ellen Christiansen	Prime Video
2022 (74th)	Stranger Things	"Chapter Seven: The Massacre at Hawkins Lab"	Chris Trujillo, Sean Brennan, Jess Royal	Netflix
2023 (75th)
2023 (75th)	Guillermo del Toro's Cabinet of Curiosities		Tamara Deverell, Brandt Gordon, Shane Vieau	Netflix
2023 (75th)	Daisy Jones & the Six	"Track 10: Rock 'n' Roll Suicide"	Jessica Kender, Brian Grego, Lisa Clark, Andi Brittan	Prime Video
2023 (75th)	House of the Dragon	"The Heirs of the Dragon"	Jim Clay, Dominic Masters, Claire Nia Richards	HBO
2023 (75th)	The Marvelous Mrs. Maisel	"Susan"	Bill Groom, Neil Prince, Ellen Christiansen	Prime Video
2023 (75th)	Perry Mason	"Chapter Eleven"	Keith P. Cunningham, Ian Scroggins, Halina Siwolop	HBO
2024 (76th)
2024 (76th)	Shōgun	"Anjin"	Helen Jarvis, Chris Beach, Lisa Lancaster, Jonathan Lancaster	FX
2024 (76th)	Fallout	"The End"	Howard Cummings, Laura Ballinger Gardner, Regina Graves	Prime Video
2024 (76th)	The Gilded Age	"Close Enough to Touch"	Bob Shaw, Larry W. Brown, Lisa Crivelli Scoppa	HBO
2024 (76th)	Palm Royale	"Maxine's Like a Dellacorte"	Jon Carlos, Mark Taylor, Amelia Brooke, Ellen Reede	Apple TV+
2024 (76th)	Ripley		David Gropman, Karen Schulz Gropman, Alex Santucci, Alessandra Querzola	Netflix
2025 (77th)
2025 (77th)	Andor	"Who Are You?"	Luke Hull, Toby Britton, Rebecca Alleway	Disney+
2025 (77th)	Bridgerton	"Romancing Mister Bridgerton"	Alison Gartshore, Antony Cartlidge, Natalie Papageorgiadis	Netflix
2025 (77th)	Dune: Prophecy	"The Hidden Hand"	Tom Meyer, Guy Potgieter, Carolyn Loucks	HBO
2025 (77th)	1923	"Wrap Thee in Terror"	Cary White, Lisa Ward, Sean Ryan Jennings, Carla Curry	Paramount+
2025 (77th)	Pachinko	"Chapter Thirteen"	Ruth Ammon, Larry Spittle, Eric Jeon, Ann Victoria Smart	Apple TV+
2026 (78th)
2026 (78th)	Fallout	"The Wrangler"	Howard Cummings, David Lazan, Julie Ochipinti	Prime Video
2026 (78th)	The Gilded Age	"If You Want to Cook an Omelette"	Bob Shaw, Larry W. Brown, Jennifer Alex Nickason	HBO
2026 (78th)	Palm Royale	"Maxine Does Something Good"	Jon Carlos, Rachel Aguirre, Amelia Brooke, Mark Robert Taylor, Ellen Reede	Apple TV
2026 (78th)	Spider-Noir	"Step Into My Office"	Warren Alan Young, Mark Larkin, Halina Siwolop	MGM+ / Prime Video
2026 (78th)	Stranger Things	"Chapter Four: Sorcerer"	Chris Trujillo, Sean Brennan, Jess Royal	Netflix

== Programs with multiple awards ==
Totals combined with Outstanding Art Direction for a Single-Camera Series.

5 awards

- Game of Thrones
- Boardwalk Empire

2 awards

- The Crown
- Rome

== Programs with multiple nominations ==
Totals combined with Outstanding Art Direction for a Single-Camera Series.

8 nominations

- Game of Thrones

7 nominations

- American Horror Story (Note: Total includes American Horror Story's nominations for Production Design for a Narrative Contemporary Program (One Hour or More) and Outstanding Art Direction for a Miniseries or Movie.)
- Mad Men

5 nominations

- Boardwalk Empire
- The Crown (Note: Total includes The Crown's nomination for Production Design for a Narrative Contemporary Program (One Hour or More).)
- Downton Abbey
- The Marvelous Mrs. Maisel
- Star Trek: The Next Generation

4 nominations

- Masters of Sex
- Quantum Leap
- Star Trek: Deep Space Nine
- Westworld

3 nominations

- Deadwood
- The Gilded Age
- Stranger Things
- The Tudors

2 nominations

- The Adams Chronicles
- The Borgias
- Bridgerton
- Carnivàle
- Fallout
- The Knick
- The Man in the High Castle
- The Mandalorian (Note: Total includes The Mandalorian's nomination for Outstanding Production Design for a Narrative Program (Half-Hour or Less).)
- Penny Dreadful
- Perry Mason
- Roots
- The Young Indiana Jones Chronicles
