= Primetime Emmy Award for Outstanding Production Design for a Narrative Contemporary Program (One Hour or More) =

Television award category

Primetime Emmy Award for Production Design for a Narrative Contemporary Program (One Hour or More)
- Awarded for: Outstanding Production Design for a Narrative Contemporary Program (One Hour or More)
- Country: United States
- Presented by: Academy of Television Arts & Sciences
- Currently held by: Pluribus (2026)
- Website: emmys.com

The Primetime Emmy Award for Production Design for a Narrative Contemporary Program (One Hour or More) is an award handed out annually at the Creative Arts Emmy Awards.

In 2014, the category was created alongside Primetime Emmy Award for Outstanding Production Design for a Narrative Program (Half-Hour) and Primetime Emmy Award for Outstanding Production Design for a Narrative Period or Fantasy Program (One Hour or More). From 2014 to 2017, contemporary and fantasy programs competed together. Fantasy programs compete alongside period programs since 2018.

== Winners and nominations ==
=== 2010s ===
| Year | Program | Episode(s) | Nominees | Network |
|---|---|---|---|---|
| 2010 (62nd) | Art Direction for a Miniseries or Movie | | | |
| 2010 (62nd) | The Pacific | | Anthony Pratt, Dominic Hyman, Richard Hobbs, Scott Bird, Jim Millett, Rolland Pike, Lisa Thompson | HBO |
| 2010 (62nd) | Georgia O'Keeffe | | Stephen Altman, John Bucklin, Helen Britten | Lifetime |
| 2010 (62nd) | Return to Cranford | | Donal Woods, Mark Kebby, Trisha Edwards | PBS |
| 2010 (62nd) | Temple Grandin | | Richard Hoover, Meghan C. Rogers, Gabriella Villarreal | HBO |
| 2010 (62nd) | You Don't Know Jack | | Mark Ricker, Amy Fritz, Rena DeAngelo | HBO |
| 2010 (62nd) | Art Direction for a Single-Camera Series | | | |
| 2010 (62nd) | The Tudors | "Sixth and the Final Wife" | Tom Conroy, Colman Corish, Crispian Sallis | Showtime |
| 2010 (62nd) | Glee | "Pilot" | Mark Hutman, Christopher Brown, Barbara Munch | Fox |
| 2010 (62nd) | Heroes | "Brave New World" | Ruth Ammon, Sandy Getzler, Ron Franco | NBC |
| 2010 (62nd) | Lost | "Ab Aeterno" | Zack Grobler, Matthew C. Jacobs, Carol Bayne Kelley | ABC |
| 2010 (62nd) | Modern Family | "Moon Landing," "Fears" | Richard Berg, Amber Haley | ABC |
| 2010 (62nd) | True Blood | "Never Let Me Go," "I Will Rise Up," "Frenzy" | Suzuki Ingerslev, Catherine Smith, Laura Richarz | HBO |
| 2011 (63rd) | Art Direction for a Miniseries or Movie | | | |
| 2011 (63rd) | Mildred Pierce | | Mark Friedberg, Peter Rogness, Ellen Christiansen | HBO |
| 2011 (63rd) | Downton Abbey | | Donal Woods, Charmian Adams, Gina Cromwell | PBS |
| 2011 (63rd) | The Kennedys | | Rocco Matteo, Mun Ying Kwun, Enrico Campana | Reelz |
| 2011 (63rd) | Upstairs Downstairs | | Eve Stewart, David Hindle, Julia Castle | PBS |
| 2011 (63rd) | Art Direction for a Single-Camera Series | | | |
| 2011 (63rd) | Boardwalk Empire | "Boardwalk Empire" | Bob Shaw, Doug Huszti, Debra Schutt | HBO |
| 2011 (63rd) | The Borgias | "Lucrezia's Wedding" | François Séguin, Jonathan McKinstry, Judit Varga | Showtime |
| 2011 (63rd) | Mad Men | "Public Relations" | Dan Bishop, Christopher Brown, Claudette Didul | AMC |
| 2011 (63rd) | Modern Family | "Halloween" | Richard Berg, Amber Haley | ABC |
| 2011 (63rd) | True Blood | "Beautifully Broken" | Suzuki Ingerslev, Catherine Smith, Laura Richarz | HBO |
| 2012 (64th) | Art Direction for a Miniseries or Movie | | | |
| 2012 (64th) | Great Expectations | | David Roger, Paul Ghirardani, Jo Kornstein | PBS |
| 2012 (64th) | American Horror Story | "Open House" | Mark Worthington, Edward L. Rubin, Ellen Brill | FX |
| 2012 (64th) | American Horror Story | "Pilot" | Beth Rubino, Charles M. Lagola, Ellen Brill | FX |
| 2012 (64th) | Hatfields & McCoys | | Derek R. Hill, Serban Porupca, John B. Vertrees, Sally Black | History |
| 2012 (64th) | Hemingway & Gellhorn | | Geoffrey Kirkland, Nanci Noblett, Jim Erickson | HBO |
| 2012 (64th) | Sherlock: A Scandal in Belgravia | | Arwel Jones, Dafydd Shurmer, Joelle Rumbelow | PBS |
| 2012 (64th) | Art Direction for a Single-Camera Series | | | |
| 2012 (64th) | Boardwalk Empire | "Peg of Old," "Battles of the Century," "To the Lost" | Bill Groom, Adam Scher, Carol Silverman | HBO |
| 2012 (64th) | Game of Thrones | "Garden of Bones," "The Ghost of Harrenhal," "A Man Without Honor" | Gemma Jackson, Frank Walsh, Tina Jones | HBO |
| 2012 (64th) | Downton Abbey | "Episode 4" | Donal Woods, Charmian Adams, Judy Farr | PBS |
| 2012 (64th) | Justified | "Cut Ties" | Dave Blass, Oana Bogdan Miller, Shauna Aronson | FX |
| 2012 (64th) | Mad Men | "At the Codfish Ball" | Dan Bishop, Christopher Brown, Claudette Didul | AMC |
| 2013 (65th) | Art Direction for a Miniseries or Movie | | | |
| 2013 (65th) | Behind the Candelabra | | Howard Cummings, Patrick M. Sullivan Jr., Barbara Munch | HBO |
| 2013 (65th) | American Horror Story: Asylum | "I Am Anne Frank, Part 2" | Mark Worthington, Andrew Murdock, Ellen Brill | FX |
| 2013 (65th) | American Horror Story: Asylum | "Welcome to Briarcliff" | Mark Worthington, Edward L. Rubin, Ellen Brill | FX |
| 2013 (65th) | Phil Spector | | Patrizia von Brandenstein, Fredda Slavin, Diane Lederman | HBO |
| 2013 (65th) | Seal Team Six: The Raid on Osama Bin Laden | | Guy Barnes, Rosario Provenza, Wendy Ozols-Barnes | Nat Geo |
| 2013 (65th) | Art Direction for a Single-Camera Series | | | |
| 2013 (65th) | Boardwalk Empire | "Sunday Best," "Two Imposters," "Margate Sands" | Bill Groom, Adam Scher, Carol Silverman | HBO |
| 2013 (65th) | The Borgias | "Siblings" | Jonathan McKinstry, Adam O'Neill, Judit Varga | Showtime |
| 2013 (65th) | Downton Abbey | "Episode 7" | Donal Woods, Mark Kebby, Gina Cromwell | PBS |
| 2013 (65th) | Game of Thrones | "Valar Dohaeris," "Kissed by Fire" | Gemma Jackson, Andy Thomson, Rob Cameron | HBO |
| 2013 (65th) | True Blood | "Whatever I Am, You Made Me," "Let's Boot and Rally," "Sunset" | Suzuki Ingerslev, Catherine Smith, Ron Franco | HBO |
| 2014 (66th) | Production Design for a Narrative Contemporary or Fantasy Program (One Hour or More) | | | |
| 2014 (66th) | Game of Thrones | "The Laws of Gods and Men," "The Mountain and the Viper" | Deborah Riley, Paul Ghirardani, Rob Cameron | HBO |
| 2014 (66th) | House of Cards | "Chapter 18," "Chapter 24" | Steve Arnold, Halina Gebarowicz, Tiffany Zappulla | Netflix |
| 2014 (66th) | Justified | "A Murder of Crowes," "Wrong Roads," "The Toll" | Dave Blass, Oana Bogdan, Shauna Aronson | FX |
| 2014 (66th) | True Blood | "At Last," "Fuck the Pain Away," "In the Evening" | Suzuki Ingerslev, Cat Smith, Ron V. Franco | HBO |
| 2014 (66th) | True Detective | "Seeing Things," "The Locked Room," "Form and Void" | Alex DiGerlando, Mara LePere-Schloop, Tim Beach, Cynthia Slagter | HBO |
2015 (67th)
| 2015 (67th) | Game of Thrones | "High Sparrow," "Unbowed, Unbent, Unbroken," "Hardhome" | Deborah Riley, Paul Ghirardani, Rob Cameron | HBO |
| 2015 (67th) | Constantine | "The Darkness Beneath," "Feast of Friends," "The Saint of Last Resorts, Part 1" | Dave Blass, Hugo Santiago, Drew Monahan, Natali Pope | NBC |
| 2015 (67th) | Gotham | "Pilot" | Doug Kraner, Laura Ballinger Gardner, Regina Graves | Fox |
| 2015 (67th) | House of Cards | "Chapter 29," "Chapter 36" | Steve Arnold, Halina Gebarowicz, Tiffany Zappulla | Netflix |
| 2015 (67th) | True Blood | "Jesus Gonna Be Here," "I Found You," "Fire in the Hole" | Suzuki Ingerslev, Cat Smith, Ron V. Franco | HBO |
2016 (68th)
| 2016 (68th) | Game of Thrones | "Blood of My Blood," "The Broken Man," "No One" | Deborah Riley, Paul Ghirardani, Rob Cameron | HBO |
| 2016 (68th) | American Horror Story: Hotel | | Mark Worthington, Denise Hudson, Ellen Brill | FX |
| 2016 (68th) | House of Cards | "Chapter 41," "Chapter 47," "Chapter 48" | Steve Arnold, Halina Gebarowicz, Tiffany Zappulla | Netflix |
| 2016 (68th) | The Man in the High Castle | "The New World" | Drew Boughton, Linda King, Brenda Meyers-Ballard | Amazon |
| 2016 (68th) | Penny Dreadful | "Fresh Hell," "Evil Spirits in Heavenly Places," "And Hell Itself My Only Foe" | Jonathan McKinstry, Jo Riddell, Philip Murphy | Showtime |
2017 (69th)
| 2017 (69th) | The Handmaid's Tale | "Offred" | Julie Berghoff, Evan Webber, Sophie Neudorfer | Hulu |
| 2017 (69th) | Penny Dreadful | "Perpetual Night," "The Blessed Dark" | Jonathan McKinstry, Jo Riddell, Philip Murphy | Showtime |
| 2017 (69th) | Westworld | "The Bicameral Mind" | Zack Grobler, Steve Christensen, Julie Ochipinti | HBO |
| 2017 (69th) | Westworld | "The Original" | Nathan Crowley, Steve Christensen, Julie Ochipinti | HBO |
| 2017 (69th) | The Young Pope | | Ludovica Ferrario, Alexandro Maria Santucci, Laura Casalini | HBO |
| 2018 (70th) | Production Design for a Narrative Contemporary Program (One Hour or More) | | | |
| 2018 (70th) | The Handmaid's Tale | "June" | Mark White, Elisabeth Williams, Martha Sparrow, Caroline Gee | Hulu |
| 2018 (70th) | American Horror Story: Cult | | Jeff Mossa, Rachel Robb Kondrath, Claire Kaufman | FX |
| 2018 (70th) | The Handmaid's Tale | "Seeds," "First Blood," "After" | Elisabeth Williams, Martha Sparrow, Rob Hepburn | Hulu |
| 2018 (70th) | Ozark | "My Dripping Sleep" | Derek R. Hill, John Richardson, Chuck Potter | Netflix |
| 2018 (70th) | Twin Peaks | | Ruth De Jong, Cara Brower, Florencia Martin | Showtime |
2019 (71st)
| 2019 (71st) | The Handmaid's Tale | "Holly" | Mark White, Elisabeth Williams, Martha Sparrow, Robert Hepburn | Hulu |
| 2019 (71st) | Escape at Dannemora | | Mark Ricker, James Truesdale, Cherish M. Hale | Showtime |
| 2019 (71st) | Killing Eve | "The Hungry Caterpillar" | Laurence Dorman, Beckie Harvey, Linda Wilson | BBC America |
| 2019 (71st) | Ozark | "Outer Darkness," "The Gold Coast" | Derek R. Hill, John Richardson, Kim Leoleis | Netflix |
| 2019 (71st) | The Umbrella Academy | "We Only See Each Other at Weddings and Funerals" | Mark Worthington, Mark Steele, Jim Lambie | Netflix |

=== 2020s ===
| Year | Program | Episode(s) | Nominees | Network |
|---|---|---|---|---|
2020 (72nd)
| 2020 (72nd) | The Handmaid's Tale | "Household" | Elisabeth Williams, Martha Sparrow, Robert Hepburn | Hulu |
| 2020 (72nd) | Big Little Lies | "What Have They Done?", "The Bad Mother", "I Want to Know" | John Paino, Austin Gorg, Amy Wells | HBO |
| 2020 (72nd) | Killing Eve | "Are You from Pinner?" | Laurence Dorman, Beckie Harvey, Casey Williams | BBC America |
| 2020 (72nd) | The Morning Show | "In the Dark Night of the Soul It's Always 3:30 in the Morning" | John Paino, James F. Truesdale, Amy Wells | Apple TV+ |
| 2020 (72nd) | Ozark | "Wartime" | David Bomba, Sean Ryan Jennings, Kim Leoleis | Netflix |
| 2020 (72nd) | Succession | "This Is Not for Tears" | Stephen H. Carter, Carmen Cardenas, George DeTitta, Ana Buljan | HBO |
2021 (73rd)
| 2021 (73rd) | Mare of Easttown | | Keith P. Cunningham, James F. Truesdale, Gina Cranham, Edward McLoughlin, Sarah McMillan | HBO |
| 2021 (73rd) | The Flight Attendant | "After Dark" | Sara K White, Christine Foley, Jessica Petruccelli | HBO Max |
| 2021 (73rd) | The Handmaid's Tale | "Chicago" | Elisabeth Williams, Martha Sparrow, Larry Spittle, Rob Hepburn | Hulu |
| 2021 (73rd) | The Undoing | | Lester Cohen, Doug Huszti, Keri Lederman | HBO |
| 2021 (73rd) | Yellowstone | "Going Back to Cali" | Cary White, Yvonne Boudreaux, Carla Curry | Paramount |
2022 (74th)
| 2022 (74th) | Squid Game | "Gganbu" | Chae Kyoung-sun, Gim En-jee, Kim Jeong-gon | Netflix |
| 2022 (74th) | The Flight Attendant | "Seeing Double" | Nina Ruscio, Josh Lusby, Mari Lappalainen, Matt Callahan | HBO Max |
| 2022 (74th) | Ozark | "The Beginning of the End", "Let the Great World Spin", "Sanctified" | David Bomba, Sean Ryan Jennings, Kim Leoleis | Netflix |
| 2022 (74th) | Severance | "Good News About Hell" | Jeremy Hindle, Nick Francone, Angelica Borrero-Fortier, Andrew Baseman | Apple TV+ |
| 2022 (74th) | Succession | "Too Much Birthday" | Stephen H. Carter, Marci Mudd, George DeTitta Jr. | HBO |
| 2022 (74th) | The White Lotus | | Laura Fox, Charles Varga, Jennifer Lukehart | HBO |
2023 (75th)
| 2023 (75th) | Wednesday | "Wednesday's Child Is Full of Woe" | Mark Scruton, Adrian Curelea, Robert Hepburn | Netflix |
| 2023 (75th) | The Last of Us | "Infected" | John Paino, Don Macaulay, Paul Healy | HBO |
| 2023 (75th) | Poker Face | "The Orpheus Syndrome" | Judy Rhee, Martha Sparrow, Cathy Marshall | Peacock |
| 2023 (75th) | Succession | "America Decides" | Stephen H. Carter, Molly Mikula, George DeTitta Jr. | HBO |
| 2023 (75th) | Ted Lasso | "Sunflowers" | Paul Cripps, Iain White, Kate Goodman | Apple TV+ |
| 2023 (75th) | The White Lotus | "Ciao" | Cristina Onori, Gianpaolo Rifino, Letizia Santucci | HBO |
2024 (76th)
| 2024 (76th) | The Crown | "Sleep, Dearie Sleep" | Martin Childs, Mark Raggett, Alison Harvey | Netflix |
| 2024 (76th) | Fargo | "Trials and Tribulations" | Trevor Smith, Cathy Cowan, Amber Humphries | FX |
| 2024 (76th) | The Gentlemen | "Tackle Tommy Woo Woo" | Martyn John, Fiona Gavin, Linda Wilson | Netflix |
| 2024 (76th) | The Morning Show | "The Kármán Line" | Nelson Coates, Thomas Wilkins, Lauree Martell | Apple TV+ |
| 2024 (76th) | True Detective: Night Country | | Daniel Taylor, Jo Riddell, Charlotte Dirickx | HBO |
2025 (77th)
| 2025 (77th) | Severance | "Chikhai Bardo" | Jeremy Hindle, Chris Shriver, Ann Bartek, David Schlesinger | Apple TV+ |
| 2025 (77th) | The Last of Us | "Day One" | Don MacAulay, David Clarke, Jonathan Lancaster, Lisa Lancaster | HBO |
| 2025 (77th) | The Penguin | "Homecoming" | Kalina Ivanov, Deborah Wheatley, Rich Murray, Richard Devine | HBO |
| 2025 (77th) | The Residence | "The Fall of the House of Usher" | François Audouy, A. Todd Holland, Halina Siwolop | Netflix |
| 2025 (77th) | The White Lotus | "Amor Fati" | Cristina Onori, Jeremy Woolsey, Letizia Santucci | HBO |
2026 (78th)
| 2026 (78th) | Pluribus | "Grenade" | Denise Pizzini, Dins Danielsen, Ashley Michelle Marsh | Apple TV |
| 2026 (78th) | Euphoria | "This Little Piggy" | François Audouy, A. Todd Holland, Anthony Carlino | HBO |
| 2026 (78th) | The Pitt | "9:00 P.M." | Nina Ruscio, Josh Lusby, Matt Callahan | HBO Max |
| 2026 (78th) | Slow Horses | "Incommunicado" | Choi Ho Man, Oskars Vilnitis-Pantelejevs, Kamlan Man | Apple TV |
| 2026 (78th) | Wednesday | "If These Woes Could Talk" | Mark Scruton, Shane McEnroe, David Morison | Netflix |

== Programs with multiple wins ==
4 wins

- The Handmaid's Tale

2 wins

- The X-Files

== Programs with multiple nominations ==
Totals combined with Outstanding Art Direction for a Single-Camera Series.

11 nominations

- Murder, She Wrote

7 nominations

- American Horror Story (Note: Total includes American Horror Story’s nominations for Production Design for a Narrative Period or Fantasy Program (One Hour or More) and Outstanding Art Direction for a Miniseries or Movie.)

6 nominations

- The Handmaid's Tale
- True Blood

5 nominations

- The Crown (Note: Total includes The Crown’s nominations for Outstanding Production Design for a Narrative Period or Fantasy Program (One Hour or More).)
- Dynasty
- Heroes
- Mission: Impossible
- Six Feet Under
- The West Wing

4 nominations

- Moonlighting
- NYPD Blue
- Ozark
- The Sopranos
- The X-Files

3 nominations

- Alias
- Fame
- Hart to Hart
- House of Cards
- Sex and the City
- St. Elsewhere
- Succession
- Ted Lasso (Note: Total includes Ted Lasso’s nominations for Outstanding Production Design for a Narrative Program (Half-Hour or Less).)
- The White Lotus

2 nominations

- The Adams Chronicles
- Ally McBeal
- Desperate Housewives
- The Flight Attendant
- Hill Street Blues
- Justified
- Killing Eve
- The Last of Us
- Mannix
- The Morning Show
- Northern Exposure
- Pushing Daisies
- Severance
- Thirtysomething
- Ugly Betty
- True Detective
- Twin Peaks
- Wednesday
