= Art Directors Guild Award for Excellence in Production Design for a One-Hour Period or Fantasy Single-Camera Series =

Television award

The Art Directors Guild Award for Outstanding Production Design for One Hour or Fantasy Single-Camera Series is an award handed out annually by the Art Directors Guild. It was introduced at the Art Directors Guilds' 18th annual honors, in 2014. After all television programs were combined for the first four ceremonies, including miniseries for the first, the category narrowed its honorees to single-camera series. From the fifth ceremony until the 13th, the category remained for all single-camera series, before narrowing, again, to honor single-camera series with a length of one hour. Finally, in 2015, the category was re-classified to its current iteration.

== Winners and nominations ==
=== 1990s ===
Excellence in Production Design Award - Television

Year	Program	Episode(s)	Nominees	Network
1996 (1st)
1996 (1st)	Star Trek: Deep Space Nine		Herman F. Zimmerman (production designer), Randall McIlvain (art director)	Syndication
1996 (1st)	Frasier		Roy Christopher (production designer), Wendell Johnson	NBC
1996 (1st)	Mrs. Santa Claus		Hub Braden (production designer), Mary Dodson (art director)	CBS
1996 (1st)	NYPD Blue		Richard C. Hankins (production designer), Alan E. Muraoka (art director), Lauren Crasco (assistant art director)	ABC
1996 (1st)	The Summer of Ben Tyler		Jan Scott (production designer), Tim Eckel (art director)	CBS
1997 (2nd)
1997 (2nd)	Brooklyn South		Paul Eads (production designer), Lee Mayman (art director)	CBS
1997 (2nd)	Babylon 5		John Iacovelli (production designer), Mark Walters (art director), Julie Aldedice-Rae (assistant art director)	PTEN
1997 (2nd)	Frasier		Roy Christopher (production designer), Richard Fernandez (art director)	NBC
1997 (2nd)	Nothing Sacred		Michael Baugh (production designer), Cate Bangs (art director)	ABC
1997 (2nd)	Star Trek: Voyager		Richard James (production designer); Leslie Parsons, Louise Dorton (art directors)	UPN
1998 (3rd)
1998 (3rd)	The X-Files		Corey Kaplan (production designer); Sandy Getzler, Lauren Polizzi (art directors); Kevin Kavanaugh (assistant art director)	Fox
1998 (3rd)	Buddy Faro		Tom Walsh (production designer), Kim Hix (art director)	CBS
1998 (3rd)	Seven Days		Carol Winstead Wood (production designer); Eric Orbom, Gregory A. Weimerskirch (art directors); Beala Neel (assistant art director)	UPN
1998 (3rd)	Sports Night		Tom Azzari (production designer)	ABC
1998 (3rd)	Star Trek: Voyager		Richard James (production designer), Louise Dorton (art director)	UPN
1999 (4th)
1999 (4th)	The West Wing	"Pilot"	Jon Hutman (production designer), Tony Fanning (art directors)	NBC
1999 (4th)	The Magnificent Seven		Jerry Wanek (production designer), John Bucklin (art director)	CBS
1999 (4th)	Roswell		Vincent Jefferds (production designer), Dawn Snyder (art director)	The WB
1999 (4th)	Star Trek: Voyager		Richard James (production designer), Louise Dorton (art director)	UPN
1999 (4th)	The X-Files		Corey Kaplan (production designer); Sandy Getzler, Lauren Polizzi (art directors); Steve Miller (assistant art director)	Fox

=== 2000s ===
Excellence in Production Design Award - Television, Single Camera Series

Year	Program	Episode(s)	Nominees	Network
2000 (5th)
2000 (5th)	The X-Files		Corey Kaplan (production designer); Sandy Getzler, Lauren Polizzi (art directors); Steven Miller (assistant art director)	Fox
2000 (5th)	Boston Public	"Chapter One"	Paul Eads (production designer), Mindy Roffman (art director)	Fox
2000 (5th)	City of Angels	"Pilot"	Michael Baugh (production designer), Ken Creber (art director)	CBS
2000 (5th)	Judging Amy		Michael Mayer (production designer), Scott Meehan (art director)	CBS
2000 (5th)	Star Trek: Voyager		Richard James (production designer), Louise Dorton (art director)	UPN
2001 (6th)
2001 (6th)	Six Feet Under	"Pilot"	Marcia Hinds (production designer), Tom Taylor (art director)	HBO
2001 (6th)	24	"12:00 a.m. – 1:00 a.m."	Carlos Barbosa (production designer), Tim Beach (art director)	Fox
2001 (6th)	Alias	"Reckoning"	Scott Chambliss (production designer), Cece De Stefano (art director)	ABC
2001 (6th)	Dark Angel		Jerry Wanek (production designer); Daniel T. Hermansen, John E. Marcynuk (art directors); Douglas A. Girling, Vivien M. Nishi (assistant art directors)	Fox
2001 (6th)	The West Wing		Kenneth Hardy (production designer)	NBC
2002 (7th)
2002 (7th)	Alias	"Cipher"	Scott Chambliss (production designer), Cece De Stefano (art director)	ABC
2002 (7th)	American Dreams	"Pilot"	Philip Toolin (production designer), Matthew Budgeon (art director), Laura Hopkins (assistant art director)	NBC
2002 (7th)	Crossing Jordan	"One Twelve (Upon the Wasted Building)"	Curtis Schnell (production designer), Daniel Vivanco (art director), Matthew Conrad (assistant art director)	NBC
2002 (7th)	Push, Nevada	"Pilot"	Edward T. McAvoy (production designer), Alan Muraoka (art director)	ABC
2002 (7th)	The Shield	"Pilot"	James Newport (production designer), William J. Durrell Jr. (art director)	FX
2003 (8th)
2003 (8th)	Carnivàle	"Milfay"	Bernt Amadeus Capra (production designer), Jeremy Cassells (art director)	HBO
2003 (8th)	24		Joseph Hodges (production designer)	Fox
2003 (8th)	Alias		Scott Chambliss (production designer), Cece De Stefano (art director)	ABC
2003 (8th)	CSI: Crime Scene Investigation		Richard Berg (production designer), Tim Eckel (art director), Debra Wilbur (assistant art director)	CBS
2003 (8th)	Las Vegas		Peter Politanoff (production designer), Tomas Voth (art director)	NBC

Excellence in Production Design Award - Single Camera Television Series

Year	Program	Episode(s)	Nominees	Network
2004 (9th)
2004 (9th)	Desperate Housewives	"Ah, But Underneath"	Tom Walsh (production designer); Kim Hix, P. Erik Carlson (art directors); Steve Samanen (assistant art director)	ABC
2004 (9th)	Alias	"Legacy"	Scott Chambliss (production designer), Cece De Stefano (art director)	ABC
2004 (9th)	Cold Case	"Factory Girls"	Corey Kaplan (production designer), Sandy Getzler (art director)	CBS
2004 (9th)	Jack & Bobby	"An Innocent Man"	Dina Lipton (production designer), Marc Dabe (assistant art director)	The WB
2004 (9th)	Lost	"Pilot"	Mark Worthington (production designer), Christina Wilson (art director), Ray Yamagata (assistant art director)	ABC
2005 (10th)
2005 (10th)	Rome	"The Stolen Eagle"	Joseph Bennett (production designer); Domenico Sica, Carlo Serafin, Dominic Hyman (art directors); Daniela Giovannoni (assistant art director)	HBO
2005 (10th)	Deadwood	"Requiem for a Gleet"	Maria Caso (production designer); James J. Murakami, David Potts (art directors); Michael J. Kelley (assistant art director)	HBO
2005 (10th)	Desperate Housewives	"They Ask Me Why I Believe You"	Tom Walsh (production designer), P. Erik Carlson (art directors), Steve Samanen (assistant art director)	ABC
2005 (10th)	Las Vegas	"The Real McCoy"	Richard Toyon (production designer), Scott Meehan (supervising art director), Tom Frohling (art director)	NBC
2005 (10th)	Lost	"Orientation"	James H. Spencer (production designer), William F. Matthews (art director)	ABC
2006 (11th)
2006 (11th)	Ugly Betty	"The Box and the Bunny"	Mark Worthington (production designer); Jim Wallis, Kathleen Widomski (art directors); Charles E. McCarry (art director - New York); Wing Lee (assistant art director - New York)	ABC
2006 (11th)	24	"Day 5: 7:00 a.m. – 8:00 a.m."	Joseph Hodges (production designer), Bruce Robert Hill (art director)	Fox
2006 (11th)	Deadwood	"True Colors"	Maria Caso (production designer), David Potts (art director), Michael J. Kelley (assistant art director)	HBO
2006 (11th)	Heroes	"Six Months Ago"	Ruth Ammon (production designer), Michael Budge (art director), Matthew C. Jacobs (art director)	NBC
2006 (11th)	Studio 60 on the Sunset Strip	"Pilot"	Carlos Barbosa (production designer), Tim Beach (art director)	NBC
2007 (12th)
2007 (12th)	Mad Men	"Shoot"	Dan Bishop (production designer), Christopher Brown (art director)	AMC
2007 (12th)	Heroes	"Five Years Gone"	Ruth Ammon (production designer); Matthew C. Jacobs, Tom Taylor (art directors)	NBC
2007 (12th)	Lost	"Through the Looking Glass"	Zack Grobler (production designer); Scott Cobb, Andrew Murdock (art directors)	ABC
2007 (12th)	Pushing Daisies	"Pie-lette"	Michael Wylie (production designer), William J. Durrell Jr. (art director)	ABC
2007 (12th)	Ugly Betty	"East Side Story"	Mark Worthington (production designer), Jim Wallis (art director)	ABC

Excellence in Production Design Award - One Hour Single Camera Television Series

Year	Program	Episode(s)	Nominees	Network
2008 (13th)
2008 (13th)	Mad Men	"The Jet Set"	Dan Bishop (production designer), Christopher Brown (art director), Shanna Starzyk (assistant art director), Camille M. Bratkowski (set designer), Robin Richesson (graphic designer)	AMC
2008 (13th)	Pushing Daisies	"Bzzzzzzzzz!"	Michael Wylie (production designer); Kenneth J. Creber (art director); Phil Dagort, Jeff Ozimek (set designers); Kim Papazian (graphic designer); Halina Siwolop (set decorator)	ABC
2008 (13th)	True Blood	"Burning House of Love"	Suzuki Ingerslev (production designer); Catherine Smith (art director); Macie Vener (assistant art director); Dan Caplan (storyboard artist); Daniel Bradford (set designer); Cindy Carr, Rusty Lipscomb (set decorators)	HBO
2008 (13th)	The Tudors	"Everything Is Beautiful"	Tom Conroy (production designer); Colman Corish, Carmel Nugent (art directors); Melanie Downes (standby art director); Liz Colbert (assistant art director); Anna Rackard (set designer); Pilar Valencia (graphic designer); Jenny Oman (set decorator)	Showtime
2008 (13th)	Ugly Betty	"When Betty Met YETI"	Mark Worthington (production designer); Charles McCarry (art director); Larry W. Brown, Eric Bryant (assistant art directors); Jim Wallis (set designer); Robert Bernard (scenic graphic artist); Alex Gorodetsky (charge scenic artist); Archie D'Amico, Rich Devine (set decorators)	ABC
2009 (14th)
2009 (14th)	Mad Men	"Souvenir"	Dan Bishop (production designer), Christopher Brown (art director), Shanna Starzyk (assistant art director), Robin Richesson (illustrator), Camille M. Bratkowski (set designer), Geoffrey Mandel (graphic designer), Amy Wells (set decorator)	AMC
2009 (14th)	Glee	"Pilot"	Mark Hutman (production designer), Christopher Brown (art director), Camille M. Bratkowski (set designer), Barbara Munch (set decorator)	Fox
2009 (14th)	Pushing Daisies	"Kerplunk"	Michael Wylie (production designer); Kenneth J. Creber (art director); Phil Dagort, Jeff Ozimek (set designers); Kim Papazian (graphic designer); Halina Siwolop (set decorator)	ABC
2009 (14th)	True Blood	"Never Let Me Go"	Suzuki Ingerslev (production designer), Catherine Smith (art director), Macie Vener (assistant art director), Daniel Bradford (set designer), Laura Richarz (set decorators)	HBO
2009 (14th)	Ugly Betty	"When Betty Met YETI"	Mark Worthington (production designer); Charles McCarry (art director); Larry W. Brown, Eric Bryant (assistant art directors); Robert Bernard (graphic designer); Alex Gorodetsky (scenic artist); Rich Devine (set decorator)	ABC

=== 2010s ===
Year	Program	Episode(s)	Nominees	Network
2010 (15th)
2010 (15th)	Mad Men	"Public Relations"	Dan Bishop (production designer), Christopher Brown (art director), Shanna Starzyk (assistant art director), Camille M. Bratkowski (set designer), Geoffrey Mandel (graphic designer), Claudette Didul (set decorator)	AMC
2010 (15th)	24	"Day 8: 4:00 p.m. – 5:00 p.m."	Carlos Barbosa (production designer); Carlos Osorio (art director); Amy Maier (assistant art director); Marco Miehe, Ron Yates, Cameron Birnie (set designers); Adam Tankell (graphic designer); Cloudia Rebar (set decorator)	Fox
2010 (15th)	Glee	"Britney/Brittany"	Mark Hutman (production designer), Michael Rizzo (art director), Timothy M. Earls (set designer), Jason Sweers (graphic designer), Barbara Munch (set decorator)	Fox
2010 (15th)	True Blood	"Trouble"	Suzuki Ingerslev (production designer); Catherine Smith (art director); Macie Vener (assistant art director); Daniel Bradford (set designer); Robert Greenfield, Laura Richarz (set decorators)	HBO
2010 (15th)	The Tudors	"Sixth and the Final Wife"	Tom Conroy (production designer); Colman Corish (art director); Carmel Nugent (assistant art director); Briana Hegarty, Brendan Rankin, Lesley Oakley (set designer); Annie Atkins (graphic designer); Crispian Sallis (set decorator)	Showtime

Excellence in Production Design Award - Episode of a One Hour Single-Camera Television Series

Year	Program	Episode(s)	Nominees	Network
2011 (16th)
2011 (16th)	Boardwalk Empire	"21"	Bill Groom (production designer); Charley Beal, Adam Scher (art directors); Emily Beck, Larry M. Gruber (assistant art directors); Ted Haigh (graphic designer); Jon Ringbom (scenic artist); Carol Silverman (set decorator)	HBO
2011 (16th)	American Horror Story: Murder House	"Murder House"	Mark Worthington (production designer); Edward L. Rubin (art director); Kenneth A. Larson (set designer); Robert Bernard, Ellen Brill (set decorators)	FX
2011 (16th)	Game of Thrones	"A Golden Crown"	Gemma Jackson (production designer); Thomas Brown, Paul Inglis, Tom McCullagh (art directors); Ashleigh Jeffers (assistant art director); Heather Greenlees (set designer); Kimberley Pope (illustrator); Jim Stanes (graphic designer); Rohan Harris (scenic artist); William Simpson (storyboard artist); Richard Roberts (set decorator)	HBO
2011 (16th)	Pan Am	"Pilot"	Bob Shaw (production designer); Adam Scher (art director); John Pollard (assistant art director); Ruth Falco, Rumiko Ishii (set designers); Gary Cergol (graphic designer); Ginger Ingram LaBella (graphic artist); Liz Bonaventura (scenic artist); Jacqueline Jacobson Scarfo (set decorator)	ABC
2011 (16th)	The Playboy Club	"The Scarlet Bunny"	Scott P. Murphy (production designer); Gary Baugh (art director); Jonathan Arkin, Stephen Morahan (assistant art directors); David Tennenbaum (set designer); Dorothy Street (graphic designer); Beauchamp Fontaine, Tricia Schneider (set decorators)	NBC
2012 (17th)
2012 (17th)	Game of Thrones	"The Ghost of Harrenhal"	Gemma Jackson (production designer); Heather Greenlees, Ashleigh Jeffers, Tom McCullagh, Andy Thomson, Frank Walsh (art directors); Sara-Jo Baugh (assistant art director); Brendan Rankin (set designer); Kimberley Pope (illustrator); Michael Eaton (graphic designer); Rohan Harris (scenic artist); Tina Jones (set decorator)	HBO
2012 (17th)	Boardwalk Empire	"Resolution"	Bill Groom (production designer); Adam Scher (art director); Emily Beck, Larry M. Gruber, Dan Kuchar, Miguel Lopez-Castillo, Barbara Matis (assistant art directors); Jan Jericho (illustrator); Ted Haigh (graphic designer); Jon Ringbom (scenic artist); Carol Silverman (set decorator)	HBO
2012 (17th)	Downton Abbey	"Christmas at Downton Abbey"	Donal Woods (production designer), Charmian Adams (supervising art director), Mark Kebby (art director), Philippa Broadhurst (standby art director), Judy Farr (set decorator)	PBS
2012 (17th)	Homeland	"The Choice"	John D. Kretschmer (production designer), Geoffrey S. Grimsman (art director), Summer Eubanks (set decorator), Stephan Beck (set designer), Luci Wilson (assistant set decorator), Tiffany Apple Keenan (graphic designer), Alton McClellan (scenic artist)	Showtime
2012 (17th)	The Newsroom	"We Just Decided To"	Richard Hoover (production designer), Jeff Schoen (art director), Martin Charles (graphic designer), Sandy Struth (set decorator)	HBO
2013 (18th)
2013 (18th)	Game of Thrones	"Valar Dohaeris"	Gemma Jackson (production designer); Christina Moore (supervising art director - Morocco); Andy Thomson (supervising art director); Heather Greenlees, Ashleigh Jeffers, Tom Still (art directors); Mark Lowry, Brendan Rankin, Caireen Todd (assistant art directors); Max Berman, Steve Summersgill (concept artists); Michael Eaton (graphic designer); Rohan Harris (scenic artist); William Simpson (storyboard artist); Rob Cameron (set decorator)	HBO
2013 (18th)	Boardwalk Empire	"The Old Ship of Zion"	Bill Groom (production designer); Adam Scher (art director); Emily Beck, Larry M. Gruber, Dan Kuchar, Neil Prince (assistant art directors); Jan Jericho (illustrator); Ariel Poster (graphic artist); Ted Haigh (graphic designer); Jon Ringbom (scenic artist); Carol Silverman (set decorator)	HBO
2013 (18th)	Breaking Bad	"Felina"	Mark S. Freeborn (production designer); Paula Dal Santo (art director); Billy W. Ray (assistant art director); Derrick Ballard, Derek Jensen, Gregory G. Sandoval (set designer); JoAnna Maes-Corlew (graphic designer); Michael Flowers (set decorator)	AMC
2013 (18th)	Downton Abbey	"Episode Seven"	Donal Woods (production designer); Charmian Adams, Mark Kebby (art directors); Chantelle Valentine (assistant art director); Gina Cromwell (set decorator)	PBS
2013 (18th)	Mad Men	"The Better Half"	Dan Bishop (production designer), Christopher Brown (art director), Shanna Starzyk (assistant art director), Evan Regester (graphic designer), Camille M. Bratkowski (set designer), Claudette Didul (set decorator)	AMC

Excellence in Production Design Award - One-Hour Period or Fantasy Single-Camera Series

Year	Program	Episode(s)	Nominees	Network
2014 (19th)
2014 (19th)	Game of Thrones	"The Laws of Gods and Men"	Deborah Riley (production designer); Paul Ghirardani (supervising art director); Christina Moore (supervising art director-Croatia); Alex Baily, Philip Elton, Hauke Richter (art directors); Ivo Husnjak, Iain White (art directors-Croatia); Brendan Rankin, Aoife Warren (assistant art directors); Mark Lowry (stand-by art director-Dragon); Philippa Broadhurst (stand-by art director-Wolf); Michael Eaton (graphic designer); David Packard (scenic artist); Nick Ainsworth, Max Berman, Peter McKinstry (concept artists); William Simpson (storyboard artist); Rob Cameron (set decorator)	HBO
2014 (19th)	Boardwalk Empire	"Golden Days for Boys and Girls"	Bill Groom (production designer); Adam Scher (art director); Emily Beck, Larry M. Gruber, Dan Kuchar (assistant art directors); Ariel Poster (graphic artist); Ted Haigh (graphic designer); Jan Jericho (illustrator); Jon Ringbom (scenic artist); Carol Silverman (set decorator)	HBO
2014 (19th)	Gotham	"Pilot", "Selina Kyle", "Arkham"	Doug Kraner (production designer); Laura Ballinger, Charley Beal (art directors); Ann Bartek, James Bolenbaugh, Larry W. Brown, Ruth Falco, Rumiko Ishii, Lauren Rockman (assistant art directors); Eric Fehlberg (illustrator); Laurel Kolsby (graphic designer); Roland Brooks (scenic artist); Andrew Baseman, Regina Graves (set decorators)	Fox
2014 (19th)	Mad Men	"Time Zones"	Dan Bishop (production designer), Shanna Starzyk (art director), Andrew Hull (assistant art director), Camille M. Bratkowski (set designer), Evan Regester (graphic designer), Claudette Didul (set decorator)	AMC
2014 (19th)	The Knick	"Method and Madness", "Working Late a Lot"	Howard Cummings (production designer); Henry Dunn (art director); Laura Ballinger, Doug Huszti, Rumiko Ishii, Marion Kolsby, Miguel López-Castillo, Jeffrey D. McDonald, Chris Shriver (assistant art directors); Eric Fehlberg, Gregory Hill (illustrators); Holly Watson (graphic designer); Patricia Sprott (scenic artist); Regina Graves (set decorator)	Cinemax
2015 (20th)
2015 (20th)	Game of Thrones	"High Sparrow", "Unbowed, Unbent, Unbroken", "Hardhome"	Deborah Riley (production designer); Paul Ghirardani, Christina Moore (supervising art directors); Philip Elton, Mark Lowry, Hauke Richter, Nick Wilkinson, Iain White (art directors); Brendan Rankin (assistant art director); Jim Stanes (graphic designer); Nick Ainsworth, Kieran Belshaw, Peter McKinstry (concept artists); Rob Cameron (set decorator)	HBO
2015 (20th)	Downton Abbey	"A Moorland Holiday"	Donal Woods (production designer), Mark Kebby (art director), Linda Wilson (set decorator)	PBS
2015 (20th)	Gotham	"Rise of the Villains: Strike Force", "Rise of the Villains: Damned If You Do..."	Richard Berg (production designer); Anu Schwartz (art director); Katherine Akiko Day, Lauren Rockman (assistant art directors); Alexios Chrysikos (illustrator); Drew Weininger (graphic designer); Roland Brooks (scenic artist); Andrew Baseman (set decorator)	Fox
2015 (20th)	Mad Men	"Person to Person"	Dan Bishop (production designer), Shanna Starzyk (art director), Andrew Hull (assistant art director), Camille M. Bratkowski (set designer), Evan Regester (graphic designer), Claudette Didul (set decorator)	AMC
2015 (20th)	The Knick	"Ten Knots", "The Best with the Best to Get the Best", "Wonderful Surprises"	Howard Cummings (production designer); Laura Ballinger (art director); Ann Bartek, Katya Blumenberg, Larry W. Brown, Markus Maurette, Maite Perez-Nievas (assistant art directors); Jan Jericho (illustrator); Holly Watson (graphic designer); Patricia Sprott (scenic artist); William J. Hopper, Mitchell Landsman (graphic artists); Regina Graves (set decorator)	Cinemax
2016 (21st)
2016 (21st)	Westworld	"The Original"	Nathan Crowley (production designer); Naaman Marshall (art director); Jenne Lee, Erik Osusky (assistant art director); Andrew Birdzell, Martha Johnston, Adam Mull, Paul Sonski (set designers); Romek Delmata (illustrator); Phillis Lehmer (graphic designer); Cesar E. Lemus (storyboard artist); Julie Ochipinti (set decorator)	HBO
2016 (21st)	The Crown	"Wolferton Splash", "Hyde Park Corner", "Smoke and Mirrors"	Martin Childs (production designer); Mark Raggett (supervising art director); Lizzie Kilham, Louise Lannen, Hannah Moseley, James Wakefield (art directors); Damian Léon Watts (assistant art director); Ben Turner (digital set designer); Neil Floyd (graphic designer); Tom Turner (draughtsman); Danny Hirsch (title artist); Celia Bobak, Sophie Coombes, Alison Harvey (set decorators)	Netflix
2016 (21st)	Game of Thrones	"Blood of My Blood", "The Broken Man", "No One"	Deborah Riley (production designer); Paul Ghirardani, Christina Moore (supervising art directors); Philip Elton, Hauke Richter, Jan Walker, Nick Wilkinson, Iain White (art directors); Vanessa O'Connor (set designer); Jim Stanes (graphic designer); Nick Ainsworth, Kieran Belshaw, Magdalena Kusowska (concept artists); Rob Cameron (set decorators)	HBO
2016 (21st)	The Man in the High Castle	"The Tiger's Cave", "Land O' Smiles", "Fallout"	Drew Boughton (production designer); Roxanne Methot, Dawn Swiderski, Teresa Weston (art directors); Tristan Paris Bourne, Lisa Pouliot, Paul Sonski (set designers); Howard Lau (illustrator); Keli Manson (graphic designer); Crystal Strode (graphic artist); Darcy Yurchuk (scenic artist); Jonathan Lancaster (set decorator)	Amazon
2016 (21st)	Stranger Things	"Chapter One: The Vanishing of Will Byers", "Chapter Three: Holly, Jolly", "Chapter Eight: The Upside Down"	Chris Trujillo (production designer); William G. Davis (art director); John Snow (assistant art director); Heath Hancock (graphic designer); Rob Nagy, Justin Trudeau (set designers); Jess Royal (set decorator)	Netflix
2017 (22nd)
2017 (22nd)	Game of Thrones	"Dragonstone", "The Queen's Justice", "Eastwatch"	Deborah Riley (production designer); Paul Ghirardani, Christina Moore (supervising art directors); Philip Elton, Brendan Rankin, Hauke Richter, Nick Wilkinson (art directors); Iain White (art director: foreign unit); Harry Pain (art director: set decoration); Mark Lowry (standby art director: Dragon unit); Rachel Aulton (standby art director: Wolf unit); Vanessa O'Connor, James M. Spencer (assistant art directors); Jim Stanes (graphic designer); David Packard, Greg Winter (scenic artists); Nick Ainsworth, Kieran Belshaw, Daniel Blackmore, Chris Caldow, Philipp Scherer (concept artists); Jessica Sinclair (concept artist: set decoration); Dan Caplan (storyboard artist); Owen Black, Archie Campbell-Baldwin (draftspeople); Megan McCrea (junior draftsperson); Rhiannon Fraser (graphic designer); Rob Cameron (set decorator)	HBO
2017 (22nd)	The Crown	"A Company of Men", "Beryl", "Dear Mrs. Kennedy"	Martin Childs (production designer); Mark Raggett (supervising art director); Eddy Andres, Hannah Moseley, James Wakefield (art directors); Lizzie Kilham (standby art director); Amy Grewcock (graphic designer); Keith Weir (storyboard artist); Alison Harvey (set decorator)	Netflix
2017 (22nd)	Mindhunter	"Episode 1", "Episode 4", "Episode 9"	Steve Arnold (production designer); Andres Cubillan, Gary Kosko (art directors); Sandra Doyle Carmola, Gary McMonnies (assistant art directors); Sarah Contant, Kate Dougherty, Julie Ray, Cassidy Shipley (set designers); Eleni Diamantopoulos (graphic designer); Tracey A. Doyle (set decorator)	Netflix
2017 (22nd)	A Series of Unfortunate Events	"The Bad Beginning: Part One", "The Reptile Room: Part One", "The Wide Window: Part One"	Bo Welch (production designer); Dan Hermansen (supervising art director); Laurel Bergman, Don Macaulay (art directors); Mira Caveno, Sean Goojha (assistant art directors); John Burke, Doug Girling, Sheila Millar, Peter Stratford, Bryan Sutton (set designers); John Wilcox (scenic artist); Lisa Leung, Slava Shmakin (graphic artists); Kasra Farahani, Warren Flanagan, Jamie Rama, Milena Zdravkovic (concept artists); Sandy Walker (set decorator)	Netflix
2017 (22nd)	Stranger Things	"Chapter Six: The Spy", "Chapter Eight: The Mind Flayer", and "Chapter Nine: The Gate"	Chris Trujillo (production designer), Sean Brennan (art director), John Snow (assistant art director), Rob Nagy (set designer), Heath Hancock (graphic designer), Jess Royal (set decorator)	Netflix
2018 (23rd)
2018 (23rd)	The Marvelous Mrs. Maisel	"Simone", "We're Going to the Catskills!"	Bill Groom (production designer); Neil Prince (supervising art director); Jan Jericho, Thierry Zemmour (art directors); Emily Beck, Ted LeFevre (assistant art directors); George DuPont, Mark Pollard (graphic designers); Robert Topol (scenic artist); Ellen Christiansen, Benoît Tetelin (set decorators)	Amazon
2018 (23rd)	The Haunting of Hill House	"The Bent-Neck Lady"	Patricio M. Farrell (production designer); Heather R. Dumas, Hugo Santiago (art director); Jamie Rama (illustrator); Chris Arnold, Ron Mason, Wright McFarland, Kristen Nowotarski, Erik Louis Robert (set designers); Michelle Sink Langford (graphic designer); Kristie Thompson (set decorator)	Netflix
2018 (23rd)	The Man in the High Castle	"Now More Than Ever, We Care About You", "History Ends", "Jahr Null"	Drew Boughton (production designer); Dean A. O'Dell (supervising art director); Roxanne Methot, Teresa Weston (art directors); Megan Poss, Justin Prasad, Paul Sonski, Lucie Tremblay, Austin Chuqiao Wang (set designers); Sunil Pant (illustrator); Chelsea Brown, Nadja Penaluna, Arin Ringwald, Jonathan Stamp, Patrick Zahorodniuk (graphic designers); Jonathan Lancaster, Lisa Lancaster (set decorators)	Amazon
2018 (23rd)	A Series of Unfortunate Events	"The Ersatz Elevator: Part One"	Bo Welch (production designer); Don Macaulay (supervising art director); Catherine Ircha, Michael Wong (art directors); Mira Caveno, Sean Goojha (assistant art directors); John Wilcox (scenic artist); Lisa Leung, Slava Shmakin (graphic artists); Kasra Farahani, Warren Flanagan, Jamie Rama, Milena Zdravkovic (concept artists); Eunjung Kim, Sheila Millar, Jay Mitchell, Peter Stratford (set designers); Kate Marshal (set decorator)	Netflix
2018 (23rd)	Westworld	"Akane no Mai"	Howard Cummings (production designer); David Lazan (supervising art director); Samantha Avila, James Bolenbaugh, Jonathan Carlos (art directors); Aja Kai Rowley (assistant art director); Simon Jones (graphic designer); Daren Dochterman, Manuel Plank-Jorge (concept artists); Ernie Avila, Sarah Forrest, David Moreau, Randall D. Wilkins (set designers); Dan Caplan (illustrator); Julie Ochipinti (set decorator)	HBO
2019 (24th)
2019 (24th)	The Marvelous Mrs. Maisel	"It's Comedy or Cabbage", "A Jewish Girl Walks Into the Apollo…"	Bill Groom (production designer); Neil Prince (supervising art director); Jan Jericho, Ellen Christiansen (set decorator)	Amazon
2019 (24th)	The Crown	"Aberfan"	Martin Childs (production designer); Mark Raggett (supervising art director); Eddy Andres, Hannah Moseley, Joan Sabaté (art directors); Lizzie Kilham, Neneh Lucia, Phil Noall (standby art directors); Georgie Carson, Luke Deering, Hodei del Barrio, Gwyn Eiddior, Víctor Santacana, Tom Turner (assistant art directors); Amy Grewcock, Camise Oldfield (graphic designers); Olivia Boix, Ruta Daubure, Beth Kendrick (assistant graphic designers); Temple Clark (storyboard artist); Nigel Hughes (scenic artist); Sophie Coombes, Nuria Guardia, Alison Harvey, Neesh Ruben (set decorators)	Netflix
2019 (24th)	Game of Thrones	"The Bells"	Deborah Riley (production designer); Paul Ghirardani (supervising art director); Philip Elton, Harry Pain, Hauke Richter, Nick Wilkinson (art directors); Rachel Aulton, Mark Lowry (standby art directors); Brendan Rankin (senior draughtsman); Qwen Black, Jamie Shakespeare (draughtsmen); Grace-Anna Hay (junior draftsperson); Rhiannon Fraser, Jim Stanes (graphic designers); Thomas Kirkwood, David Packard (scenic artists); Kieran Belshaw, Daniel Blackmore, Philipp Scherer, Jessica Sinclair, Ulrich Zeidler (concept artists); Rob Cameron (set decorator)	HBO
2019 (24th)	The Mandalorian	"Chapter 1: The Mandalorian"	Andrew L. Jones (production designer); Michael Manson (supervising art director); John Lord Booth III, Sarah Delucchi, Jeff Wisniewski (art directors); David Chow, Sarah Forrest, David Moreau, Julien Pougnier, Mike Stassi (set designers); Michael Epstein (graphic artist); Seth Engstrom, Fabian Lacey, Manuel Plank-Jorge (concept artists); Jason Mahakian (model maker); David Duncan, Dave Lowery, Phillip Norwood (storyboard artists); Amanda Serino (set decorator)	Disney+
2019 (24th)	A Series of Unfortunate Events	"Penultimate Peril: Part 1"	Bo Welch (production designer); Don Macaulay (supervising art director); Catherine Ircha, Michael Wong (art directors); Mira Caveno, Sean Goojha (assistant art directors); John Wilcox (scenic artist); Lisa Leung, Slava Shmakin (graphic artists); Kasra Farahani, Warren Flanagan, Jamie Rama, Milena Zdravkovic (concept artists); Alex Juzkiw, Eunjung Kim, Sheila Millar, Jay Mitchell, Peter Stratford (set designers); Kasra Farahani, Warren Flanagan, Jamie Rama, Milena Zdravkovic (illustrators); Kate Marshal (set decorator)	Netflix

=== 2020s ===
Year	Program	Episode(s)	Nominees	Network
2020 (25th)
2020 (25th)	The Mandalorian	"Chapter 13: The Jedi"	Doug Chiang, Andrew L. Jones (production designers); David Lazan (supervising art director); Johnny Jos, Bradley Rubin (art directors); Rebekah Bukhbinder, Ji Young Lee (assistant art directors); Jim Hewitt, Robert Andrew Johnson, Anshuman Prasad, Easton Smith, Jane Wuu (set designers); Michael Epstein (graphic designer); Khang Le (concept artists); Jason Mahakian (model maker); Dave Lowery, Phillip Norwood (storyboard artists); Amanda Serino (set decorator)	Disney+
2020 (25th)	The Crown	"War"	Martin Childs (production designer); Mark Raggett (supervising art director); Eddy Andres, Hannah Moseley, James Wakefield (art directors); Lizzie Kilham, Phil Noall (standby art directors); Ian Crossland, Luke Deering (assistant art directors); Amy Grewcock, Camise Oldfield, Toby Stevens (graphic designers); Lavleena Korotania (assistant graphic designers); Temple Clark (storyboard artist); Alexandra Walker (draughtsman); Carolyn Boult, Sophie Coombes, Alison Harvey (set decorators)	Netflix
2020 (25th)	Lovecraft Country	"I Am."	Kalina Ivanov (production designer); Audra Avery, Troy Sizemore (supervising art directors); Elena Albanese, Omar Foster, Nathan Krochmal, Mari Lappalainen (art directors); Chad Frey, Justin Trudeau (set designers); Kevin Kalaba (graphic designer); Jenn Moye (graphic artist); Summer Eubanks (set decorator)	HBO
2020 (25th)	Perry Mason	"Chapter 3"	John Perry Goldsmith (production designer); Chris Farmer (supervising art director); Robert Joseph, Anthony D. Parrillo (art directors); Nathan Bailey, Rahma Farahat, Elizabeth Flaherty (assistant art directors); Eugene Adamov, Jeff Ozimek, John Isaac Watters (set designers); Joe Weber, Randy Wilkins (digital set designers); Mark Larkin, Joshua McKevitt, Carly Sertic (graphic designers); Dan Engle (model maker); Halina Siwolop (set decorator)	HBO
2020 (25th)	Westworld	"Parce Domine"	Howard Cummings (production designer); David Lazan (supervising art director); Samantha Avila, James Bolenbaugh, Jonathan Carlos (art directors); Aja Kai Rowley (assistant art director); Simon Jones (graphic designer); Daren Dochterman, Manuel Plank-Jorge (concept artists); Ernie Avila, Sarah Forrest, David Moreau, Randall D. Wilkins (set designers); Dan Caplan (illustrator); Julie Ochipinti (set decorator)	HBO
2021 (26th)
2021 (26th)	Loki	"Glorious Purpose"	Kasra Farahani (production designer); Natasha Gerasimova (supervising art director); Drew Monahan, Domenic Silvestri, Lauren Abiouness, Marlie Arnold, Brian Baker, Laurel Bergman (art directors); Nathan Bailey, May Mitchell (assistant art directors); Josh Viers, Joe Studzinski, Shae Shatz, Alex Cunningham, Shane Baxley (illustrators); Jason Sweers, Heath Hancock (graphic designers); Nick S Cross, Patrick Dunn-Baker, Silvia Mahapatra, Colin Sieburgh, Tim Croshaw, Sam Page, Robert Fechtman, Dee Blackburn, Kevin Vickery (set designers); Brett Phillips (model maker); Martin Mercer, Federico D'Alessandro, Darrin Denlinger (storyboard artists); Wesley Burt (concept artist); Claudia Bonfe (set decorator)	Disney+
2021 (26th)	Foundation	"The Emperor's Peace"	Rory Cheyne (production designer); Nigel Churcher, Conor Dennison, William Cheng, Adorján Portik (supervising art directors); Samantha Dick, Hank Gay, Stefany Koutroumpis, Shane McEnroe, Martin Goulding, Greg Shaw, Kevin Lang, Mary Pike, Aaron Morrison, Brad Milburn, David Fremlin, Jeremy Gillespie, Jonathan Marin Socas, Gunnar Palsson, Frances Soeder, Jens Löckmann, Marc Bitz, Gary McGinty (art directors); Barbara Agbaje, Ben Turnbull, Maryann Adas, Sarah Zanon, Taylor Colpitts, Karl Crosby, Khanh Quach, Dave Wood, Katy Thatcher, Jon Chan, Jane Stoiacico, Sorin Popescu, Joelle Craven, Paul Greenberg, Anna Lupi (assistant art directors); Paul Chadeisson, Wayne Haag, Stephan Martiniere, Henry Fong, Bartol Rendulic, Amro Attia (concept artists); Aoife Murray (standby art director); Ash Thorp (illustrator); Benton Jew (storyboard artist); Libbe Eyers, Ingeborg Heinemann (set decorators); Henning Brehm (graphic designer);	Apple TV+
2021 (26th)	Lost in Space	"Three Little Birds"	Alec Hammond (production designer); Gregory Clarke, Benoit Waller (art directors); Alexandra Juzkiw, Sophie Graham (assistant art directors); Steven Thomas, Houman Estrangi, Kris Bergthorson, Peter Rzazewski, Cristian Arizaga (set designers); Joe Parker (model maker); Patrick Faulwetter, Sunil Pant (concept artist); Neil Westlake, Alex Fountain (graphic designers); Janessa Hitsman (set decorator)	Netflix
2021 (26th)	The Witcher	"A Grain of Truth"	Andrew Laws (production designer); Stuart Kearns (supervising art director); Justin Warburton-Brown (senior art director); Dominic Hyman, Marco Restivo, Chantelle Valentine, Danny Clark, Philip Elton, Sophie Bridgman, Ashley Winter, Mark Larkin (art directors); Jamie Shakespeare, Celene McDowell (assistant art directors); Todd Ellis (standby art director); Miranda Cull (on set art director); Ewa Galak, Chelsea Davison, Oliver Herrick (draughtsmans); Dániel Veres, László Szabados, Zolán Mányi, Gábor Szabó (concept artists); Tommy Jolliffe (scenic artist); Sam Moulsdale, Tim Brockbank (graphic designers); Louis Burnett (graphic artist); Robert Cameron(set decorator)	Netflix
2021 (26th)	The Great	"Dickhead", "Seven Days", "Wedding"	Francesca di Mottola (production designer); Marcus Wookey (supervising art director); Emma Painter (senior art director); Aline Leonello, Amaya Valentina, Mike Jones (art directors); Tabitha Dickinson, Matt Wells, Miranda Cull (standby art directors); George Tomlinson, Giulia Alessio, Sarah Welsman (model makers); Camilla Sicignano (concept artist); Florence Tasker (graphic designer); Ishbel Amyatt-Lier (assistant graphic designer); Lilyana Houghton-Freeman (assistant art director); Monica Alberte (set decorator)	Hulu

Excellence in Production Design – One-Hour Period Single-Camera Series

Year	Program	Episode(s)	Nominees	Network
2022 (27th)	The Crown	"Ipatiev House"	Martin Childs (production designer); Mark Raggett (supervising art director); Chris Wyatt, Hannah Moseley, James Wakefield, Ian Crossland (art directors); Luke Deering (assistant art directors); Caterina Vanzi (standby art director); Alexandra Walker (draughtsmans); Amy Grewcock, Camise Oldfield, Charlie Innell, Lavleena Korotania, Toby Stevens (graphic designers); Alison Harvey, Carolyn Boult, Sophie Boult (set decorators); Brendan Houghton (storyboard artist); Annie Neilson, Olivia Boix (assistant graphic designer)	Netflix
2022 (27th)	The Gilded Age	"Never the New"	Bob Shaw (production designer); Laura Ballinger Gardner, Larry Brown (supervising art director); Ryan Heck (art director); Aimee Dombo, Ann Bartek, Michael Auszura, Tom Gleeson, Maki Takenouchi, Deborah Wheatley (assistant art directors); Hugh Sicotte (illustrator); Matthew J Sama (concept illustrator); Patricia Sprott, Jason Marzano, Dana Kenn (scenic artists); Holly Watson, Dan-ah Kim, Jeremy Wong, Jannick Guillou (graphic designers); Regina Graves (set decorator)	HBO
2022 (27th)	The Marvelous Mrs. Maisel	"Maisel vs. Lennon: The Cut Contest"; "How Do You Get to Carnegie Hall?"	Bill Groom (production designer); Neil Prince (supervising art director); Katie Citti, Jan Jericho (art directors); Jeffrey D McDonald, Emily Beck, Raul Abrego, Derek Haas (assistant art directors); Bob Topol (scenic artist); Mark Pollard, George DuPont, David Tousley, Leah Spencer (graphic designers); Ellen Christiansen (set decorator)	Prime Video
2022 (27th)	Pachinko	"Chapter One"	Mara LePere-Schloop (production designer); Kimberley Zaharko, Justin Ludwig (supervising art directors); Chohea Kim (senior art director); Catriona Robinson, Lisa Pouliot (art directors); Lisa van Velden, Austin Wang, Lindsay Ledohowski, Minjeong Kim (assistant art directors); Adam Urquhart (standby art director); Younghee Choi, Soojin Kim, Eunchong Jeon, Hyunji Kim, Ena Mizuno (assistant graphic designers); Sookyung Kim, Mark Molnar, Gaspar Gombos, Orsolya Villanyi, Janos Gardos, Mike Szabados (concept artists); Diane Heard, D'Arcy Yurchuk (scenic artists); Jai Field, Mira Gim, Crystal Strode (graphic designers); Arin Ringwald (graphic artist); Hamish Purdy (set decorator); Hyojung Kim, Etienne Gravand, Inyoung Choi, Ri Yu, Ayoung Park, Taeyoung Kim, Dayeon Kim, EJ Kim, Benoit Waller (set designers)	Apple TV+
2022 (27th)	Peaky Blinders	"Black Day"	Nicole Northridge (production designer); Spencer Robertson, Louisa Morris (supervising art directors); (senior art director); Dean McLeod (art director); Molly Rose Barnard (assistant art director); Kerry-Ellen Maxwell (standby art director); Andrew Berry (assistant graphic designer); (concept artists); Ella Wolfnorth, Mary Wainwright (graphic artists); Shonagh Smith (set decorator)	BBC One

Excellence in Production Design – One-Hour Fantasy Single-Camera Series

Year	Program	Episode(s)	Nominees	Network
2022 (27th)	Andor	"Rix Road"	Luke Hull (production designer); Toby Britton (supervising art director); Mark Harris, Su Whitaker (senior art directors); Andrea Borland, Claire Fleming, Max Klaentschi, Will Coubrough (art directors); John Adkins, Kate Hunter, Cheuk Hang Chapman Kan, Charlie King, Triin Valvas (assistant art directors); Jo Ridler (standby art director); Chester Carr, Gordan Champ, Giorgio Grecu, Scott McInnes, Peter McKinstry (concept artists); David Packard (scenic artist); Dom Sikking Max, Barry Gingell, Matthew Hindle (graphic designers); Elle McKee (graphic artist); Rebecca Alleway (set decorator); Alex Hutchings (model maker); Luke Dass, Jasmine Lean, Lotta Wolgers, Andy Young (draughtsmen); Jimmy Davies, Lara Humphreys, Rebecca Lewis (junior draughtsmen)	Disney+
2022 (27th)	House of the Dragon	"The Heirs of the Dragon"	Jim Clay (production designer); Dominic Masters (supervising art director); Phil Elton, Nick Wilkinson (senior art directors); Sue Smith, Andrew Ackland-Snow, Emma Godwin, Dan Clay, Stephen Swain (art directors); Ida Grundsoee, Dana Anusca, Celene McDowell, Lotta Wolgers (assistant art directors); Richard Usher, Lydia Farrell (standby art directors); Kieran Belshaw, Qingling Zhang, Scott McInnes, Jort Van Welbergen (concept artists); Alicia Martin (graphic designer); Matilda Craston (assistant graphic designer); Claire Richards (set decorator); Thomas Turner, Ewa Galak, Daniel Warren, Tom Coxon (draughtsmen)	HBO
2022 (27th)	The Lord of the Rings: The Rings of Power	"Adar"	Ramsey Avery (production designer); Jules Cook, Don MacAulay (supervising art directors); Jill Cormack, Mark Robins (senior art directors); Jason Brown, Kim Jarrett, Iain McFayden, Ross McGarva, Andy McLaren, Mark Stephen, Helen Strevens, Philip Thomas, Ken Turner, Peter Baustaedter (art directors); Collette Mullin, Ross Perkin, Sam Storey, Todd Smythe, Brendon Sweeney, Yvonne Yip (assistant art directors); Gabriel Kearney, Simon Hall (on set art directors); Liam Beck, Mauro Borelli, James Carson, Roberto Fernández Castro, Ryan Church, Steve Cormann, Ryan Church, Rodolfo Damaggio, Pablo Dominguez Aguilar, Andrea Dopaso, Julien Gauthier, John Howe, Jaime Jones, Igor Knezevic, Andrew Leung, Gerhard Mozsi, Simon Murton, Jamie Rama, Dean Sherriff, Evan Shipard, Steve Tappin, Filipo Valsecchi, Imery Watson (concept artists); Daniel Reeve (graphic designer); Monica Fedrik, Yip Lee, Sean Andrew Murray (graphic artists); Megan Vertelle, Shane Vieau, Victor Zolfo (set decorators); Tristan Bourne, Tim Clissold, Kevin Cross, Tim Devine, Forest Fischer, Will Giles, Kevin Loo, Anne McGrath, Zahra Minogue, David Moreau, Paulina Piasta, Shari Ratliff, Barry Read, Karjius Schlogl, Shamim Seifzadeh, Marina Stojanovic, Sarah Contant, Daniel Jennings, Ron Mason, Ron Mendell, Andrea Onorato, Ed Symon, Sam Dobrec, Gordon Stotz (set designers); Samuel Cotterall, Nick Redmond, Haroun Barazanchi (draughtsmen); Dylan Coburn, Ryan McQuarters (storyboard artists); Amanda Piearcey, Jeff Frost, Laura Stephenson, Lou Zutavern, Patrick Junghans, Jake Tuck (model maker)	Prime Video
2022 (27th)	Stranger Things	"Chapter Seven: The Massacre at Hawkins Lab"	Chris Trujillo (production designer); Sean Brennan (supervising art director); John Snow, Ainis Jankauskas, Paulius Daščioras, Raimondas Dičius (art directors); Chris Yoo, Eric Johnson, Justas Paliukaitis (assistant art directors); Vanessa Riegel, Christopher B. Forster, Stanislovas Marmokas (graphic designers); Tomas Jankauskas (assistant graphic designer); Jess Royal (set decorator); Thomas J. Machan, John Thigpen, John Moredock, Kevin Crooks, Nathally Botelho, Taura Rivera (set designers)	Netflix
2022 (27th)	Wednesday	"Woe is the Loneliest Number"	Mark Scruton (production designer); Adrian Curelea (supervising art director); Serban Porupca (senior art director); Diana Ghinea, Silvia Nancu, Carmen Ratoi (art directors); Vlad Roseanu (on set art director); Iulia Pasarica, Alexandra Tudor, Andrei Florian Popa, Ana Neag (assistant art directors); Kan Muftic, Vlad Gheneli, Dermot Power (concept artists); Eusebiu Sarbu (graphic designer); Alexandru Tache, Cristina Stefan, Liviu Costin Antonescu (graphic artists); Robert Hepburn (set decorator); Andreea Siminea, Tudor Iordachescu, Madalina Ciosu, Anca Iscru, Ion Molete (set designers)	Netflix

== Programs with multiple awards ==
5 awards

- Game of Thrones (HBO)

4 awards

- Mad Men (AMC)

2 awards

- The Marvelous Mrs. Maisel (Amazon)
- The X-Files (Fox)

== Programs with multiple nominations ==
8 nominations

- Game of Thrones (HBO)*

7 nominations

- Mad Men (AMC)*

4 nominations

- 24 (Fox)
- Alias (ABC)
- Boardwalk Empire (HBO)*
- The Crown (Netflix)*
- Star Trek: Voyager (UPN)
- Ugly Betty (ABC)

3 nominations

- Downton Abbey (PBS)*
- Glee (Fox)
- Lost (ABC)
- Pushing Daisies (ABC)
- A Series of Unfortunate Events (Netflix)*
- True Blood (HBO)
- Westworld (HBO)*
- The X-Files (Fox)

2 nominations

- Deadwood (HBO)
- Desperate Housewives (ABC)
- Downton Abbey (PBS)
- Frasier (NBC)
- Gotham (Fox)*
- Heroes (NBC)
- The Knick (Cinemax)*
- Las Vegas (NBC)
- The Man in the High Castle (Amazon)*
- The Mandalorian (Disney+)
- The Marvelous Mrs. Maisel (Amazon)
- Stranger Things (Netflix)*
- The Tudors (Showtime)
- The West Wing (NBC)
