= List of awards and nominations received by Ozark =

Awards and nominations received by Ozark
Awards and nominations
| Award | Wins | Nominations |
| AARP Movies for Grownups Awards | 0 | 1 |
| African-American Film Critics Association | 0 | 1 |
| American Cinema Editors Awards | 1 | 2 |
| Art Directors Guild Awards | 1 | 3 |
| Association of Motion Picture Sound Awards | 0 | 1 |
| Australian Academy of Cinema and Television Arts | 0 | 2 |
| British Society of Cinematographers | 0 | 1 |
| Canadian Society of Cinematographers | 0 | 1 |
| Casting Society of America | 1 | 4 |
| Cinema Audio Society Awards | 0 | 3 |
| Critics' Choice Television Awards | 0 | 9 |
| Directors Guild of America Awards | 0 | 3 |
| Dorian Awards | 0 | 3 |
| Golden Globe Awards | 1 | 9 |
| Gran Premio Internazionale del Doppiaggio | 0 | 1 |
| Golden Reel Awards | 1 | 8 |
| Hollywood Critics Association TV Awards | 1 | 6 |
| Hollywood Music in Media Awards | 0 | 1 |
| Imagen Awards | 0 | 2 |
| Location Managers Guild Awards | 1 | 1 |
| Make-Up Artists and Hair Stylists Guild Awards | 0 | 2 |
| Motion Picture Sound Editors Awards | 0 | 3 |
| People's Choice Awards | 0 | 8 |
| Primetime Emmy Awards | 4 | 23 |
| Primetime Creative Arts Emmy Awards | 0 | 22 |
| Producers Guild of America Awards | 0 | 3 |
| Satellite Awards | 0 | 6 |
| Screen Actors Guild Awards | 3 | 14 |
| Set Decorators Society of America Awards | 0 | 1 |
| Writers Guild of America Awards | 1 | 5 |

Totals (Note: Certain award groups do not simply award one winner. They acknowledge several different recipients, have runners-up, and have third place. Since this is a specific recognition and is different from losing an award, runner-up mentions are considered wins in this award tally. For simplification and to avoid errors, each award in this list has been presumed to have had a prior nomination.)
- Wins: 15
- Nominations: 149

Ozark is an American crime drama television series created by Bill Dubuque and Mark Williams for Netflix and produced by MRC Television and Aggregate Films. The series stars Jason Bateman and Laura Linney as Marty and Wendy Byrde respectively, a married couple who move their family to the Lake of the Ozarks and become money launderers for the mob.

The series received positive reviews from critics throughout its run, with particular praise for its tone, directing, production values, and performances (particularly those of Bateman, Linney, and Julia Garner). The series has received a total of 45 Primetime Emmy Award nominations, including three for Outstanding Drama Series, with Bateman winning for Outstanding Directing for a Drama Series in 2019 and Garner winning three times for Outstanding Supporting Actress in a Drama Series in 2019, 2020, and 2022. Bateman has received two further Golden Globe Award nominations for Best Actor – Television Series Drama.

== Awards and nominations ==
Accolades for Ozark
| Award | Year | Category | Nominee(s) | Result | Ref. |
|---|---|---|---|---|---|
| AARP Movies for Grownups | 2023 | Best Actress-TV | Laura Linney | Nominated | |
| African American Film Critics Association Awards | 2022 | Best TV Drama | Ozark | Nominated | |
| American Cinema Editors Awards | 2019 | Best Edited Drama Series for Non-Commercial Television | Cindy Mollo and Heather Goodwin Floyd (for "One Way Out") | Nominated | |
| American Cinema Editors Awards | 2021 | Best Edited Drama Series for Non-Commercial Television | Cindy Mollo (for "Wartime") | Won | |
| Art Directors Guild Awards | 2019 | Excellence in Production Design for a One-Hour Contemporary Single-Camera Television Series | Derek R. Hill (for "The Gold Coast") | Nominated | |
| Art Directors Guild Awards | 2021 | Excellence in Production Design for a One-Hour Contemporary Single-Camera Television Series | David Bomba (for "Wartime") | Won | |
| Art Directors Guild Awards | 2023 | Excellence in Production Design for a One-Hour Contemporary Single-Camera Television Series | David Bomba For "The Beginning of the End", "Let the Great World Spin", & "City on the Make" | Nominated | |
| Artios Awards | 2019 | Outstanding Achievement in Casting – Television Pilot and First Season Drama | Alexa L. Fogel, Tara Feldstein Bennett, Chase Paris and John Ort | Won | |
| Artios Awards | 2020 | Television Series – Drama | Alexa L. Fogel, Chase Paris, Tara Feldstein Bennett and Kathryn Zamora-Benson | Nominated | |
| Artios Awards | 2021 | Television Series – Drama | Alexa L. Fogel, Chase Paris, Tara Feldstein Bennett and Kathryn Zamora-Benson | Nominated | |
| Artios Awards | 2023 | Television Series – Drama | Alexa L. Fogel, Chase Paris, Tara Feldstein Bennett and Kathryn Zamora-Benson | Nominated | |
| Association of Motion Picture Sound Awards | 2021 | Excellence in Sound for a Television Drama | Felipe Borrero, Jared Watt, Stephen Grubbs, Nick Forshager, & Larry Benjamin | Nominated | |
| Australian Academy of Cinema Television Arts | 2023 | International Award for Best Actor in a Series | Jason Bateman | Nominated | |
| Australian Academy of Cinema Television Arts | 2023 | International Award for Best Actress in a Series | Laura Linney | Nominated | |
| British Society of Cinematographers | 2020 | Operators Award - Television Drama | Ben Semanoff | Nominated | |
| Canadian Society of Cinematographers | 2023 | Dramatic Series Cinematography - Non-commercial | Attila Szalay For "Ace Deuce" | Nominated | |
| Cinema Audio Society Awards | 2019 | Outstanding Achievement in Sound Mixing for Television Series – One Hour | Felipe Borrero, Larry B. Benjamin, Kevin Valentine, Phillip McGowan, Matt Hovland and David Torres (for "The Badger") | Nominated | |
| Cinema Audio Society Awards | 2021 | Outstanding Achievement in Sound Mixing for Television Series – One Hour | Felipe Borrero, Larry B. Benjamin, Kevin Valentine, Phil McGowan, Chris Navarro and Amy Barber (for "All In") | Nominated | |
| Cinema Audio Society Awards | 2023 | Outstanding Achievement in Sound Mixing for Television Series – One Hour | Akira Fukasawa, Larray Benjamin, Kevin Valentine, Phil McGowan, Alan Freedman and Amy Barber (for "A Hard Way To Go") | Nominated | |
| Critics' Choice Television Awards | 2019 | Best Supporting Actress in a Drama Series | Julia Garner | Nominated | |
| Critics' Choice Television Awards | 2021 | Best Drama Series | Ozark | Nominated | |
| Critics' Choice Television Awards | 2021 | Best Actor in a Drama Series | Jason Bateman | Nominated | |
| Critics' Choice Television Awards | 2021 | Best Actress in a Drama Series | Laura Linney | Nominated | |
| Critics' Choice Television Awards | 2021 | Best Supporting Actor in a Drama Series | Tom Pelphrey | Nominated | |
| Critics' Choice Television Awards | 2021 | Best Supporting Actress in a Drama Series | Julia Garner | Nominated | |
| Critics' Choice Television Awards | 2021 | Best Supporting Actress in a Drama Series | Janet McTeer | Nominated | |
| Critics' Choice Television Awards | 2023 | Best Actress in a Drama Series | Laura Linney | Nominated | |
| Critics' Choice Television Awards | 2023 | Best Supporting Actress in a Drama Series | Julia Garner | Nominated | |
| Directors Guild of America Awards | 2019 | Outstanding Directorial Achievement in Dramatic Series | Jason Bateman (for "Reparations") | Nominated | |
| Directors Guild of America Awards | 2021 | Outstanding Directorial Achievement in Dramatic Series | Jason Bateman (for "Wartime") | Nominated | |
| Directors Guild of America Awards | 2023 | Outstanding Directorial Achievement in Dramatic Series | Jason Bateman (for "A Hard Way to Go") | Nominated | |
| Dorian Awards | 2020 | Best TV Drama | Ozark | Nominated | |
| Dorian Awards | 2020 | Best TV Performance - Actress | Laura Linney | Nominated | |
| Dorian Awards | 2020 | Best Supporting TV Performance - Actress | Julia Garner | Nominated | |
| Golden Globe Awards | 2018 | Best Actor – Television Series Drama | Jason Bateman | Nominated | |
| Golden Globe Awards | 2019 | Best Actor – Television Series Drama | Jason Bateman | Nominated | |
| Golden Globe Awards | 2021 | Best Television Series – Drama | Ozark | Nominated | |
| Golden Globe Awards | 2021 | Best Actor – Television Series Drama | Jason Bateman | Nominated | |
| Golden Globe Awards | 2021 | Best Actress – Television Series Drama | Laura Linney | Nominated | |
| Golden Globe Awards | 2021 | Best Supporting Actress – Television | Julia Garner | Nominated | |
| Golden Globe Awards | 2023 | Best Television Series – Drama | Ozark | Nominated | |
| Golden Globe Awards | 2023 | Best Actress – Television Series Drama | Laura Linney | Nominated | |
| Golden Globe Awards | 2023 | Best Supporting Actress – Television – Comedy/Musical or Drama | Julia Garner | Won | |
| Golden Reel Awards | 2018 | Outstanding Achievement in Sound Editing – Episodic Long Form – Music/Musical | Jason Tregoe Newman and Bryant Fuhrmann | Nominated | |
| Golden Reel Awards | 2018 | Outstanding Achievement in Sound Editing – Episodic Long Form – Dialogue/ADR | Nick Forshager, Steve Grubbs and Todd Niesen (for "The Toll") | Nominated | |
| Golden Reel Awards | 2018 | Outstanding Achievement in Sound Editing – Episodic Long Form – Effects/Foley | Nick Forshager, Steve Grubbs, Matt Temple, Jeff Cranford and Daniel Raphael (for "The Toll") | Won (Note: Tied with Godless) | |
| Golden Reel Awards | 2019 | Outstanding Achievement in Sound Editing – Episodic Long Form – Music/Musical | Ozark (for "The Gold Coast") | Nominated | |
| Golden Reel Awards | 2019 | Outstanding Achievement in Sound Editing – Episodic Long Form – Dialogue/ADR | Ozark (for "The Gold Coast") | Nominated | |
| Golden Reel Awards | 2021 | Outstanding Achievement in Sound Editing – Dialogue and ADR for Episodic Long Form Broadcast Media | Nick Forshager, Todd Niesen and Steve Grubbs (for "All In") | Nominated | |
| Golden Reel Awards | 2021 | Outstanding Achievement in Sound Editing – Sound Effects and Foley for Episodic Long Form Broadcast Media | Nick Forshager, Matt Decker, Matt Temple, Mark Allen, Amy Barber, Jonathan Bruce, Julia Huberman and Ben Parke (for "All In") | Nominated | |
| Golden Reel Awards | 2021 | Outstanding Achievement in Sound Editing – Music Score and Musical for Episodic Long Form Broadcast Media | Jason Tregoe Newman and Stephen Lotwis (for "Kevin Cronin Was Here") | Nominated | |
| Gran Premio Internazionale del Doppiaggio | 2018 | Best TV Series | Ozark | Nominated | |
| Hollywood Critics Association TV Awards | 2022 | Best Streaming Series, Drama | Ozark | Nominated | |
| Hollywood Critics Association TV Awards | 2022 | Best Actor in a Streaming Series, Drama | Jason Bateman | Nominated | |
| Hollywood Critics Association TV Awards | 2022 | Best Actress in a Streaming Series, Drama | Laura Linney | Won (Note: Tied with Britt Lower for Severance) | |
| Hollywood Critics Association TV Awards | 2022 | Best Supporting Actress in a Streaming Series, Drama | Julia Garner | Nominated | |
| Hollywood Critics Association TV Awards | 2022 | Best Directing in a Streaming Series, Drama | Jason Bateman (for "A Hard Way to Go") | Nominated | |
| Hollywood Critics Association TV Awards | 2022 | Best Writing in a Streaming Series, Drama | Chris Mundy (for "A Hard Way to Go") | Nominated | |
| Hollywood Music in Media Awards | 2021 | Best Music Supervision – Television | Gabe Hilfer | Nominated | |
| Imagen Awards | 2022 | Best Supporting Actor – Drama (Television) | Alfonso Herrera | Nominated | |
| Imagen Awards | 2022 | Best Supporting Actor – Drama (Television) | Felix Solis | Nominated | |
| Location Managers Guild Awards | 2018 | Outstanding Locations in Contemporary Television | Wes Hagan and Kevin Dowling | Won | |
| Make-Up Artists and Hair Stylists Guild Awards | 2021 | Best Television Series, Limited or Miniseries or New Media Series – Best Contemporary Make-Up | Tracy Ewell, Jillian Erickson and Susan Reilly Lehane | Nominated | |
| Make-Up Artists and Hair Stylists Guild Awards | 2021 | Best Television Series, Limited or Miniseries or New Media Series – Contemporary Hair Styling | Rita Parillo, Anna Hilton and Tanya Walker | Nominated | |
| People's Choice Awards | 2018 | The Drama TV Star of 2018 | Jason Bateman | Nominated | |
| People's Choice Awards | 2018 | The Bingeworthy Show of 2018 | Ozark | Nominated | |
| People's Choice Awards | 2020 | The Drama Show of 2020 | Ozark | Nominated | |
| People's Choice Awards | 2020 | The Male TV Star of 2020 | Jason Bateman | Nominated | |
| People's Choice Awards | 2020 | The Bingeworthy Show of 2020 | Ozark | Nominated | |
| People's Choice Awards | 2022 | The Drama Show of 2022 | Ozark | Nominated | |
| People's Choice Awards | 2022 | The Male TV Star of 2022 | Jason Bateman | Nominated | |
| People's Choice Awards | 2022 | The Drama TV Star of 2022 | Jason Bateman | Nominated | |
| Primetime Emmy Awards | 2018 | Outstanding Lead Actor in a Drama Series | Jason Bateman (for "The Toll") | Nominated | |
| Primetime Emmy Awards | 2018 | Outstanding Directing for a Drama Series | Jason Bateman (for "The Toll") | Nominated | |
| Primetime Emmy Awards | 2018 | Outstanding Directing for a Drama Series | Daniel Sackheim (for "Tonight We Improvise") | Nominated | |
| Primetime Emmy Awards | 2019 | Outstanding Drama Series | Jason Bateman, Chris Mundy, Bill Dubuque, Mark Williams, David Manson, Alyson Feltes, Ryan Farley, Patrick Markey, Erin Mitchell and Matthew Spiegel | Nominated | |
| Primetime Emmy Awards | 2019 | Outstanding Lead Actor in a Drama Series | Jason Bateman (for "Reparations") | Nominated | |
| Primetime Emmy Awards | 2019 | Outstanding Lead Actress in a Drama Series | Laura Linney (for "One Way Out") | Nominated | |
| Primetime Emmy Awards | 2019 | Outstanding Supporting Actress in a Drama Series | Julia Garner (for "The Gold Coast") | Won | |
| Primetime Emmy Awards | 2019 | Outstanding Directing for a Drama Series | Jason Bateman (for "Reparations") | Won | |
| Primetime Emmy Awards | 2020 | Outstanding Drama Series | Jason Bateman, Chris Mundy, Bill Dubuque, Mark Williams, Patrick Markey, John Shiban, Miki Johnson, Erin Mitchell, Martin Zimmerman, Peter Thorell and Matthew Spiegel | Nominated | |
| Primetime Emmy Awards | 2020 | Outstanding Lead Actor in a Drama Series | Jason Bateman (for "Su Casa Es Mi Casa") | Nominated | |
| Primetime Emmy Awards | 2020 | Outstanding Lead Actress in a Drama Series | Laura Linney (for "Fire Pink") | Nominated | |
| Primetime Emmy Awards | 2020 | Outstanding Supporting Actress in a Drama Series | Julia Garner (for "In Case of Emergency") | Won | |
| Primetime Emmy Awards | 2020 | Outstanding Directing for a Drama Series | Alik Sakharov (for "Fire Pink") | Nominated | |
| Primetime Emmy Awards | 2020 | Outstanding Directing for a Drama Series | Ben Semanoff (for "Su Casa Es Mi Casa") | Nominated | |
| Primetime Emmy Awards | 2020 | Outstanding Writing for a Drama Series | Miki Johnson (for "Fire Pink") | Nominated | |
| Primetime Emmy Awards | 2020 | Outstanding Writing for a Drama Series | Chris Mundy (for "All In") | Nominated | |
| Primetime Emmy Awards | 2020 | Outstanding Writing for a Drama Series | John Shiban (for "Boss Fight") | Nominated | |
| Primetime Emmy Awards | 2022 | Outstanding Drama Series | Jason Bateman, Chris Mundy, Bill Dubuque, Mark Williams, Patrick Markey, John Shiban, Miki Johnson, Laura Linney, Erin Mitchell, Martin Zimmerman, Paul Kolsby, Laura Deeley and Dana Scott | Nominated | |
| Primetime Emmy Awards | 2022 | Outstanding Lead Actor in a Drama Series | Jason Bateman (for "Pound of Flesh and Still Kickin'") | Nominated | |
| Primetime Emmy Awards | 2022 | Outstanding Lead Actress in a Drama Series | Laura Linney (for "Pound of Flesh and Still Kickin'") | Nominated | |
| Primetime Emmy Awards | 2022 | Outstanding Supporting Actress in a Drama Series | Julia Garner (for "Sanctified") | Won | |
| Primetime Emmy Awards | 2022 | Outstanding Directing for a Drama Series | Jason Bateman (for "A Hard Way to Go") | Nominated | |
| Primetime Emmy Awards | 2022 | Outstanding Writing for a Drama Series | Chris Mundy (for "A Hard Way to Go") | Nominated | |
| Primetime Creative Arts Emmy Awards | 2018 | Outstanding Cinematography for a Single-Camera Series (One Hour) | Ben Kutchins (for "The Toll") | Nominated | |
| Primetime Creative Arts Emmy Awards | 2018 | Outstanding Production Design for a Narrative Contemporary Program (One Hour or More) | Derek R. Hill, John Richardson and Chuck Potter (for "My Dripping Sleep") | Nominated | |
| Primetime Creative Arts Emmy Awards | 2019 | Outstanding Casting for a Drama Series | Alexa L. Fogel, Tara Feldstein Bennett and Chase Paris | Nominated | |
| Primetime Creative Arts Emmy Awards | 2019 | Outstanding Production Design for a Narrative Contemporary Program (One Hour or More) | Derek R. Hill, John Richardson and Kim Leoleis (for "Outer Darkness", "The Gold Coast") | Nominated | |
| Primetime Creative Arts Emmy Awards | 2019 | Outstanding Single-Camera Picture Editing for a Drama Series | Cindy Mollo and Heather Goodwin (for "One Way Out") | Nominated | |
| Primetime Creative Arts Emmy Awards | 2019 | Outstanding Sound Mixing for a Comedy or Drama Series (One-Hour) | Larry Benjamin, Kevin Valentine, Felipe 'Flip' Borrero and Dave Torres (for "The Badger") | Nominated | |
| Primetime Creative Arts Emmy Awards | 2020 | Outstanding Casting for a Drama Series | Alexa L. Fogel, Tara Feldstein Bennett and Chase Paris | Nominated | |
| Primetime Creative Arts Emmy Awards | 2020 | Outstanding Cinematography for a Single-Camera Series (One Hour) | Ben Kutchins (for "Civil Union") | Nominated | |
| Primetime Creative Arts Emmy Awards | 2020 | Outstanding Cinematography for a Single-Camera Series (One Hour) | Armando Salas (for "Boss Fight") | Nominated | |
| Primetime Creative Arts Emmy Awards | 2020 | Outstanding Contemporary Makeup (Non-Prosthetic) | Tracy Ewell, Jillian Erickson and Jack Lazzaro (for "In Case of Emergency") | Nominated | |
| Primetime Creative Arts Emmy Awards | 2020 | Outstanding Music Composition for a Series (Original Dramatic Score) | Danny Bensi and Saunder Jurriaans (for "All In") | Nominated | |
| Primetime Creative Arts Emmy Awards | 2020 | Outstanding Production Design for a Narrative Contemporary Program (One Hour or More) | David Bomba, Sean Ryan Jennings and Kim Leoleis (for "Wartime") | Nominated | |
| Primetime Creative Arts Emmy Awards | 2020 | Outstanding Single-Camera Picture Editing for a Drama Series | Cindy Mollo (for "Wartime") | Nominated | |
| Primetime Creative Arts Emmy Awards | 2020 | Outstanding Single-Camera Picture Editing for a Drama Series | Vikash Patel (for "Fire Pink") | Nominated | |
| Primetime Creative Arts Emmy Awards | 2020 | Outstanding Sound Mixing for a Comedy or Drama Series (One-Hour) | Larry Benjamin, Kevin Valentine, Felipe 'Flip' Borrero and Phil McGowan (for "All In") | Nominated | |
| Primetime Creative Arts Emmy Awards | 2022 | Outstanding Guest Actor in a Drama Series | Tom Pelphrey (for "You're the Boss") | Nominated | |
| Primetime Creative Arts Emmy Awards | 2022 | Outstanding Casting for a Drama Series | Alexa L. Fogel, Tara Feldstein Bennett and Chase Paris | Nominated | |
| Primetime Creative Arts Emmy Awards | 2022 | Outstanding Cinematography for a Single-Camera Series (One Hour) | Eric Koretz (for "A Hard Way to Go") | Nominated | |
| Primetime Creative Arts Emmy Awards | 2022 | Outstanding Contemporary Makeup (Non-Prosthetic) | Tracy Ewell, Kimberly Amacker and Susan Reilly Lehane (for "A Hard Way to Go") | Nominated | |
| Primetime Creative Arts Emmy Awards | 2022 | Outstanding Music Supervision | Gabe Hilfer (for "The Cousin of Death") | Nominated | |
| Primetime Creative Arts Emmy Awards | 2022 | Outstanding Production Design for a Narrative Contemporary Program (One Hour or More) | David Bomba, Sean Ryan Jennings and Kim Leoleis (for "The Beginning of the End") | Nominated | |
| Primetime Creative Arts Emmy Awards | 2022 | Outstanding Sound Mixing for a Comedy or Drama Series (One-Hour) | Larry Benjamin, Kevin Valentine, Akira Fukasawa and Amy Barber (for "Sanctified") | Nominated | |
| Producers Guild of America Awards | 2019 | Outstanding Producer of Episodic Television, Drama | Jason Bateman, Chris Mundy, Bill Dubuque, Mark Williams, David Manson, Alyson Feltes, Ryan Farley, Patrick Markey, Matthew Spiegel and Erin Mitchell | Nominated | |
| Producers Guild of America Awards | 2021 | Outstanding Producer of Episodic Television, Drama | Jason Bateman, Chris Mundy, Bill Dubuque, Mark Williams, Patrick Markey, John Shiban, Miki Johnson, Matthew Spiegel, Erin Mitchell, Martin Zimmerman and Peter Thorell | Nominated | |
| Producers Guild of America Awards | 2023 | Outstanding Producer of Episodic Television, Drama | Jason Bateman, Chris Mundy, Patrick Markey, John Shiban, Miki Johnson, Laura Linney, Erin Mitchell, Martin Zimmerman, Dana Scott, Paul Kolsby, and Laura Deeley | Nominated | |
| Satellite Awards | 2019 | Best Actor in a Drama / Genre Series | Jason Bateman | Nominated | |
| Satellite Awards | 2021 | Best Television Series – Drama | Ozark | Nominated | |
| Satellite Awards | 2021 | Best Actor in a Drama / Genre Series | Jason Bateman | Nominated | |
| Satellite Awards | 2021 | Best Actress in a Drama / Genre Series | Laura Linney | Nominated | |
| Satellite Awards | 2021 | Best Supporting Actor – Series, Miniseries or Television Film | Tom Pelphrey | Nominated | |
| Satellite Awards | 2022 | Best Actress in a Drama / Genre Series | Laura Linney | Nominated | |
| Screen Actors Guild Awards | 2018 | Outstanding Performance by a Male Actor in a Drama Series | Jason Bateman | Nominated | |
| Screen Actors Guild Awards | 2018 | Outstanding Performance by a Female Actor in a Drama Series | Laura Linney | Nominated | |
| Screen Actors Guild Awards | 2019 | Outstanding Performance by an Ensemble in a Drama Series | Jason Bateman, Lisa Emery, Skylar Gaertner, Julia Garner, Darren Goldstein, Jason Butler Harner, Carson Holmes, Sofia Hublitz, Laura Linney, Trevor Long, Janet McTeer, Peter Mullan, Jordana Spiro, Charlie Tahan, Robert Treveiler and Harris Yulin | Nominated | |
| Screen Actors Guild Awards | 2019 | Outstanding Performance by a Male Actor in a Drama Series | Jason Bateman | Won | |
| Screen Actors Guild Awards | 2019 | Outstanding Performance by a Female Actor in a Drama Series | Julia Garner | Nominated | |
| Screen Actors Guild Awards | 2019 | Outstanding Performance by a Female Actor in a Drama Series | Laura Linney | Nominated | |
| Screen Actors Guild Awards | 2021 | Outstanding Performance by an Ensemble in a Drama Series | Jason Bateman, McKinley Belcher III, Jessica Frances Dukes, Lisa Emery, Skylar Gaertner, Julia Garner, Sofia Hublitz, Kevin L. Johnson, Laura Linney, Janet McTeer, Tom Pelphrey, Joseph Sikora, Felix Solis, Charlie Tahan and Madison Thompson | Nominated | |
| Screen Actors Guild Awards | 2021 | Outstanding Performance by a Male Actor in a Drama Series | Jason Bateman | Won | |
| Screen Actors Guild Awards | 2021 | Outstanding Performance by a Female Actor in a Drama Series | Laura Linney | Nominated | |
| Screen Actors Guild Awards | 2021 | Outstanding Performance by a Female Actor in a Drama Series | Julia Garner | Nominated | |
| Screen Actors Guild Awards | 2023 | Outstanding Performance by an Ensemble in a Drama Series | Jason Bateman, Nelson Bonilla, Jessica Frances Dukes, Lisa Emery, Skylar Gaertner, Julia Garner, Alfonso Herrera, Sofia Hublitz, Kevin L. Johnson, Katrina Lenk, Laura Linney, Adam Rothenberg, Felix Solis, Charlie Tahan, Richard Thomas, and Damian Young | Nominated | |
| Screen Actors Guild Awards | 2023 | Outstanding Performance by a Male Actor in a Drama Series | Jason Bateman | Won | |
| Screen Actors Guild Awards | 2023 | Outstanding Performance by a Female Actor in a Drama Series | Laura Linney | Nominated | |
| Screen Actors Guild Awards | 2023 | Outstanding Performance by a Female Actor in a Drama Series | Julia Garner | Nominated | |
| Set Decorators Society of America Awards | 2022 | Best Achievement in Décor/Design of a One Hour Contemporary Series | Kim Leoleis and David Bomba | Nominated | |
| Writers Guild of America Awards | 2018 | New Series | Whit Anderson, Bill Dubuque, Paul Kolsby, Mark Williams, Martin Zimmerman, Ryan Farley, Alyson Feltes and Chris Mundy | Nominated | |
| Writers Guild of America Awards | 2019 | Episodic Drama | David Manson (for "The Precious Blood of Jesus") | Nominated | |
| Writers Guild of America Awards | 2021 | Drama Series | Laura Deeley, Bill Dubuque, Paul Kolsby, Miki Johnson, Chris Mundy, John Shiban, Ning Zhou and Martin Zimmerman | Nominated | |
| Writers Guild of America Awards | 2021 | Episodic Drama | Miki Johnson (for "Fire Pink") | Won | |
| Writers Guild of America Awards | 2023 | Episodic Drama | Chris Mundy (for "A Hard Way to Go") | Nominated | |
