= Richard Hoover (disambiguation) =

Richard B. Hoover (born 1943) is an American scientist.

Richard Hoover may also refer to:

- Richard Hoover (set designer), American set designer, production designer, and art director
- Richard R. Hoover, special effects artist
- Dick Hoover, bowler
- Dick Hoover (baseball)
- Dick Hoover (baseball coach), see Binghamton Bearcats baseball
