= Not About Nightingales =

1938 play by Tennessee Williams

First edition cover (New Directions, 1998)

Not About Nightingales is a three-act play by Tennessee Williams. He wrote the play late in 1938, after reading in a newspaper about striking inmates of a Holmesburg, Pennsylvania prison in August 1938, who had been placed in "an isolation unit lined with radiators, where four died from temperatures approaching 150 degrees.".

The play focuses on a group of inmates who go on a hunger strike. There is also a love story, with the characters Eva, the new secretary at the prison, and Jim, a handsome inmate who works for the warden and is trying to get out on parole.

In February 1939, Williams submitted the play to the Group Theatre in New York City, but they rejected it. Not About Nightingales remained unperformed and unpublished until the late 1990s when Vanessa Redgrave made it her personal mission to track the play down. It had its world premiere at the Alley Theatre in Houston in 1998 and was published the same year by New Directions, with a foreword by Redgrave.

== Plot summary ==
=== Act one ===
The play begins outside the warden's office with Eva Crane and Mrs. Bristol. Eva is there for a job interview as the new secretary for the Warden, while Mrs. Bristol is here to give her son Sailor Jack some baked goods she made just for him.

Moments after the scene begins, Jim walks through towards the warden's office and informs the women that the warden is out inspecting the grounds, and may not be back for a while. Mrs. Bristol can't stay and leaves the food on the warden's desk.

Warden Whalen enters in an unannounced, brash way. He is a short, fat, yet powerful man with a presence. Eva begins to beg him for a job; however the warden doesn't want to hear it, saying "A business executive is not interested in your personal misfortunes." In the end, after careful consideration, he gives Eva the job.

Meanwhile, Jim is being escorted back to his cell. Jim is a convict who helps out the Warden during the day. He enjoys the job because it gets him out of his cell all day. At nights when he returns, his cellmates are constantly calling him names such as Allison and Canary Bird. Some of the notable supporting characters introduced are Butch, the unofficial leader among the inmates; Queen, a gay convict who's not all that smart; and Ollie, a smart black convict who's well respected by all the inmates.

The next morning, Mrs. Bristol returns to see the warden and this time she had brought more food for her son. She explains how she hasn't heard from her son in a while and is getting worried. The warden explains, in a coarse manner, that her son had gone insane and had to be killed.

The next day, Eva talks to Jim and asks him about the eating conditions at the prison. Jim says the food is terrible; however the warden enters, and says that the food is fine. In an effort to put Jim back in line he tells the story to Eva about when Jim first got to the prison and how he had to whip him for 14 straight days to try to break through his rough exterior. This story is too much for Eva, and she ends up fainting at the end of the scene.

Down in the prison, the prisoners begin to get pains in their stomachs and have a hard time getting to sleep. Butch says that it's the poor food they are served everyday that is causing their pain, and suggests that they all go on a hunger strike. The men, all in pain, agree to the idea. Jim re-enters the prison and tells the men to hold off on the hunger-strike as he feels with his upcoming parole he can "tear down the walls of this prison".

The men agree and say they will hold off for a little longer, and instead go to dinner and cause a small prison riot. By doing so, they have all earned time in "the hole."

Back upstairs, Eva is working with the warden alone in his office. The warden begins asking personal questions toward Eva and also starts being suggestive, even asking her to "come into the closet with him." Before anything can happen, Jim walks in with a report about the prisoners in "the hole," even bringing them up to see him. After talking to them all, the warden decides they all need more time and he sends them back. Ollie, however, loses himself and doesn't want to go back; instead he rams his head into a wall and kills himself.

Word reaches the prisoners and at this moment they can't take it anymore. They are fed up with everything that is going on at the prison and begin their hunger strike.

=== Act two ===
The act begins with the Warden talking with the Prisons Chaplain, who is concerned about how the Warden is treating his prisoners. The Warden expresses his "my way or the highway" attitude toward the Chaplain. The Chaplain, not in agreement with the Warden's methods, decides to quit.

Out in the waiting room, life in the prison is getting restless, due in part of the hunger strike. Eva is answering phone calls left and right, while showing signs of stress during the process.

Jim enters with a bloody arm. He tells her that he walked too close to one of the cages and one of the inmate's grabbed hold of him. Jim tells her she should leave this place, as it's not safe, but she refuses. Her true feelings for Jim begin to show as she wants to wait until his parole comes up and leave with him. They begin to move in for a kiss when the Warden enters and breaks it up.

The new prison reverend enters the office and is instantly hired by the Warden, saying "I pride myself on being adjustable." He goes on to say that he won't interfere with what the Warden does because he's not in charge, he's just the reverend.

Afterwards, the Warden comes out and lets Jim and Eva know that if the hunger-strike continues, the men in Hall C will be moved to Klondike, a boiler room used as a torture room for out-of-line inmates, where the temperatures in the room can reach up to 150 degrees.

Moments later, Jim and Eva are alone again in the Warden's office. Jim opens up to Eva about how he can't stand the prison, the inmates, the Warden, and the guards. Eva continues to remind him that once he gets parole in a month the two will be able to run away together, but Jim is no longer optimistic about his parole. Eva reassures him that he will get out because she plans to go to the newspapers and tell them about all the terrible things that go on in the prison.

At this moment, the Warden enters and tells Jim to take a file downstairs, thus leaving him alone with Eva once again. The Warden tells her that she can't leave since the building has been put on lockdown. This frightens Eva, getting her worked up, with additional tension from the fact that the Warden takes advantage of the situation by trying to seduce her. However, something comes up and the warden leaves. Just then, Jim enters. Eva tells him that she wants to leave the prison, no matter what it takes. Jim begins to devise a plan: they will meet in the southwest corner of the prison yard when it's dark out and attempt their escape together.

=== Act three ===
The act starts out in Klondike where the prisoners from Hall C are beginning to feel the heat from the steam boiler room. Butch is doing whatever he can to keep the morale up among his men by singing and dancing, but it's having no effect.

Meanwhile, Jim and Eva have met in the southwest corner of the yard; however, the guards and the Warden have caught them and have begun to haul off Jim and put him in Klondike with the other prisoners. Warden also starts to blackmail Eva and ends up making a deal with her, that he will mail the letter of recommendation for Jim's release if she sleeps with him. Eva reluctantly agrees and episode three ends with the warden showing Eva to his "inner room".

Back down in Klondike, Jim has joined the rest of the inmates; however, before Schultz, the head guard, can notice anything about Jim or the rest of the inmates, Butch grabs hold of the guard and Jim steals his revolver and keys. The inmates open the door and lock Schultz into the steaming cell, leaving him to die. Both Butch and Jim storm into the Warden's office, Butch looking for the Warden, and Jim looking for Eva. This leads to a confrontation with the Warden, who begs for his life in a cowardly manner, "Stop! I'm a family man! I've got a wife! A daughter! A little-girrrrl." But, he is eventually killed by Butch with a whip.

When they have a minute to talk, Eva and Jim discuss their future outside of the prison, how they're in love, and the many places they plan to travel to.

Suddenly, extra police forces arrive at the prison to deal with the prison riots. Jim comes up with a plan to jump out into the river and swim to shore away from all the riots and noise. He gives Eva his shoes and tells her to look for him in the personal columns.

Jim jumps into the water, but because of the height of the jump and the fact that it is late at night, Eva is unsure if he made it safely in the water. The police arrive in the tower and grab Eva to take her to safety, bringing the play to an end. They question her about a pair of shoes she's got (which belongs to Jim), she replies "I picked them up somewhere. I can't remember", and continues to cling on to them. The audience remains unsure if Jim ever made it out safely.

== Character list ==
Eva
Single woman who recently got a job at the prison as the Warden's secretary.
Jim
Convict who's been at the prison for 10 years, he works for the Warden.
Warden Whalen
Warden of the prison, unlikeable man.
Butch
Smart talking convict, many look to him as the leader of the convicts.
Ollie
Well respected convict who is very religious. He can't handle the system and takes his life.
Queen
Image obsessed convict who is a homosexual, and not very bright.
Swifty
New convict, former Olympic athlete, feels he will get out in no time.
Joe
Typical convict, viewed by many as a sidekick to Butch.
Sailor Jack
Old sailor who went insane during his sentence in jail.
Mrs. Bristol
Mother of Sailor Jack.
Chaplain
The Chaplain of the prison who resigns for disagreeing with the Warden.
Reverend
The new Reverend of the prison who doesn't mind getting pushed around by the Warden.
Mex
Mexican Convict, who is constantly praying for a way out.

== 1999 Broadway debut ==
The actress Vanessa Redgrave, who was preparing for a role in the 1989 revival of Orpheus Descending, another Williams classic, read an introduction by Williams which referred to the horrors of Not About Nightingales. Redgrave later said, "Basically, anybody could have found the play. I was the only person who was determined to find it." She later contacted Williams' literary executor Maria St. Just, who was able to unearth the manuscript.

Redgrave brought it to Trevor Nunn who agreed to direct the play. His production debuted in London on March 5, 1998, to very positive reviews. The world premiere in London of Not About Nightingales on March 5, 1998, was a collaboration of the Royal National Theatre of Great Britain and Corin and Vanessa Redgrave's Moving Theatre, in association with the Alley Theatre. The play moved to the Alley Theatre in Houston running from June 5 to July 3, 1998. Talkin' Broadway called it "A World Class Production" and "A glimpse in the writing of Williams that would transform him from Tom to Tennessee". The next year it opened at the Circle in the Square Theatre on February 25, 1999, and was nominated for six Tony awards, including best play and best performance by a leading actor, Vanessa's brother Corin Redgrave as the Warden.

== Awards and nominations ==
Tony Awards

- Tony Award for Best Play
- Tony Award for Best Performance by a Leading Actor in a Play (Corin Redgrave)
- Tony Award for Best Performance by a Featured Actor in a Play (Finbar Lynch)
- Tony Award for Best Scenic Design (Richard Hoover) Winner
- Tony Award for Best Lighting Design (Chris Parry)
- Tony Award for Best Direction of a Play (Trevor Nunn)

Drama Desk Awards

- Outstanding Play
- Outstanding Actor in a Play (Finbar Lynch, Corin Redgrave)
- Outstanding Featured Actor in a Play (James Black)
- Outstanding Director of a Play (Trevor Nunn) Winner
- Outstanding Set Design of a Play (Richard Hoover) Winner
- Outstanding Lighting Design (Chris Parry) Winner
- Outstanding Sound Design (Christopher Shutt) Winner
- Outstanding Music in a Play (Steven Edis)
