= Diana Stoughton =

American set decorator

- Occupation: Set decorator

Diana Stoughton is an American set decorator. She was nominated for an Academy Award in the category Best Production Design for the film Ma Rainey's Black Bottom.

== Selected filmography ==
- Ma Rainey's Black Bottom (2020; co-nominated with Mark Ricker and Karen O'Hara)
