= Dave Blass =

American production designer and art director

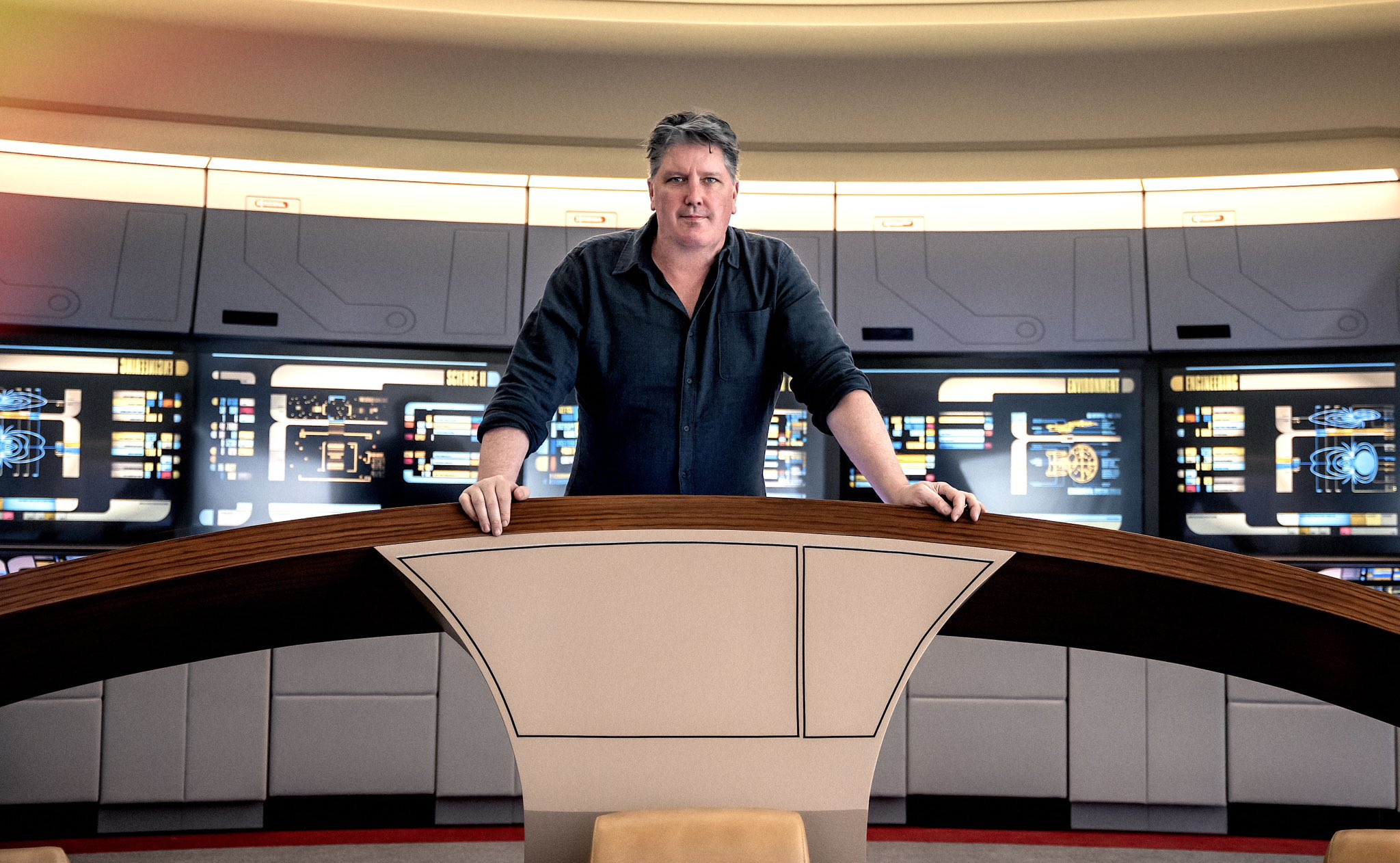
- Dave Blass on the set of Star Trek Picard
- Born: David Blass; Ashland, Massachusetts
- Education: Emerson College
- Known for: Justified, Star Trek: Picard, , The Boys , Preacher_(TV_series)

David Blass is an American production designer and art director.

== Work ==
For his work on the Justified television series Blass was nominated for the 2012 Primetime Emmy Award for Outstanding Art Direction for a Single-Camera Series for the Justified television series, and also received nominations for the Primetime Emmy Award for Outstanding Production Design for a Narrative Contemporary Program (One Hour or More) for Justified in 2014 and again in 2015 for the Constantine television series. In 2015 he was also nominated for the Art Directors Guild Award for Excellence in Production Design for a One Hour Contemporary Television Series for Justified, He has twice been published with cover stories in Perspective Magazine, with a Oct/Nov 2009 article on his pre-visualization of the final shot for the ER television series, and February/March 2012 featuring an article on his production design of the Justified series. For his work accurately portraying the State of Kentucky on the Television program Justified he was awarded the honor of "Kentucky Colonel in 2011 by Governor Steven Beshear. He was nominated for the 2017 ADG Awards for Preacher and again in 2020 for The Boys. He has received 2 Peabody Awards for his work on Star Trek and Justified.

He is a member of the Art Directors Guild and the Academy of Television Arts & Sciences.

== Personal life ==
Blass grew up in Ashland, Massachusetts and graduated from the Ashland High School, where he wrote and directed his first film, A SADD Story, for "Students Against Drunk Driving" – which won a Reader's Digest contest. He also played soccer and baseball while at Ashland High. His film achievement in high school led to him receiving a scholarship to attend the Emerson College in Boston, where he majored in film production. He then moved to California and began working in the film and television industry – initially working under Roger Corman.

== Filmography ==
=== Production design and art direction for television series ===
- Murdaugh:_Death_in_the_Family
- Star Trek: Picard
- The Boys
- Amazing Stories
- Preacher
- Pitch
- Secrets and Lies
- Quantico
- Constantine
- Justified
- Longmire
- Rectify
- Cold Case
- ER
- Black Scorpion
- The Biggest Loser
- Beauty and the Geek
- Trivial Pursuit: America Plays
- Shear Genius
- Solitary

=== Production design for films includes ===
- Asylum (Robert Patrick, Malcolm McDowell)
- Overdrive (Steve Guttenberg, Robert Wagner)
- "Stray Bullet" (Robert Carradine)

=== Writer/director credits ===
- Black Scorpion episodes "Love Burns" and "Bad Sport"

=== Director for music videos ===
- Teutonic Terror and Pandemic & Producer Stampede (for the German heavy metal band Accept)

=== Executive producer for television series ===
- True Lives (a reality TV series)
- Co-producer for Art Directors Guild Excellence in Production Design Award Show 2014 and 2015 ADG Excellence in Production Design Award
