= Patrick Markey =

American film and television producer

Patrick Markey is an American film and television producer. He has also done production management and second unit directing work. He has worked with filmmakers such as Robert Redford and Sam Raimi. He is currently on the board of directors of the Dactyl Foundation.

== Filmography ==
- DeepStar Six (1989)
- L.A. Takedown (1989)
- The Dark Wind (1991)
- A River Runs Through It (1992)
- The Joy Luck Club (1993)
- The Quick and the Dead (1995)
- Bogus (1996; executive producer)
- The Associate (1996)
- The Horse Whisperer (1998)
- The Good Life (2007)
