= Julie Ochipinti =

Set decorator and art director

- Occupations: Set decorator and art director
- Years active: 1997–present

Julie Ochipinti is an American set decorator and art director.

She was nominated at the 79th Academy Awards for Best Art Direction, for the film The Prestige. She shared the nomination with Nathan Crowley. Additionally, she was nominated four times for Outstanding Production Design for a Narrative Period Or Fantasy Program (One Hour or More) for her work in Westworld, twice at the 69th Primetime Emmy Awards and once each at the 70th and 72nd Primetime Emmy Awards.

== Selected filmography ==
- Behind Enemy Lines (2001)
- Batman Begins (2005)
- The Prestige (2006)
- The Dark Knight Rises (2012)
- John Carter (2012)
- Westworld (2017–2022)
- Fallout (2024–present)
