= Regina Graves =

American set decorator

- Occupation: Set decorator

Regina Graves is an American set decorator. She was nominated for an Academy Award in the category Best Production Design for the film The Irishman.

== Selected filmography ==
- The Irishman (2019; co-nominated with Bob Shaw)
