= Mark Ricker =

American art director and production designer

- Born: September 2, 1968 (age 57); North Carolina, U.S.
- Occupations: Art director, production designer

Mark Ricker (born September 2, 1968) is an American art director and production designer. He was nominated for an Academy Award in the category Best Production Design for the film Ma Rainey's Black Bottom. He has also been nominated for three Primetime Emmy Awards in the categories Outstanding Art Direction and Outstanding Production Design for his work on the television programs Escape at Dannemora and Halston and on the television film You Don't Know Jack.

== Selected filmography ==
- Ma Rainey's Black Bottom (2020; co-nominated with Karen O'Hara and Diana Stoughton)
