= Paul Ghirardani =

American art director

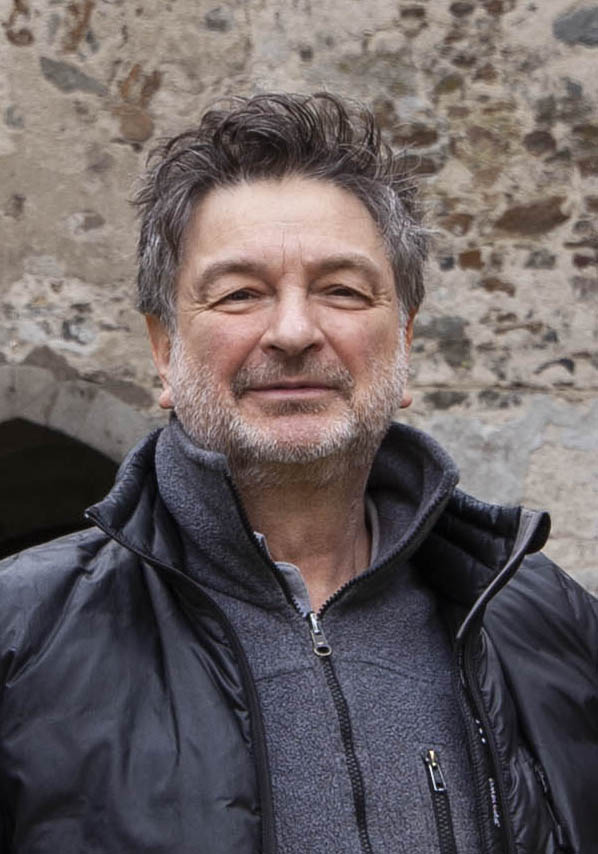
- Ghirardani in 2023
- Occupation: Art director

Paul Ghirardani is a British art director. He has won six Primetime Emmy Awards and been nominated for two more in the category Outstanding Production Design.

== Wins and nominations ==
- Little Dorrit (2008; won)
- Into the Storm (2008; nominated)
- Great Expectations (2011)
- Game of Thrones (2013; won)
- Game of Thrones (2014; won)
- Game of Thrones (2015; won)
- Game of Thrones (2017; won)
- Game of Thrones (2018; nominated)
