= Beth Rubino =

American film production designer and set decorator

- Occupations: Production designer; set decorator

Beth A. Rubino is an American film production designer and set decorator. She has been nominated for the Academy Award for Best Art Direction twice for her set decoration: in 1999 for The Cider House Rules and in 2008 for American Gangster. She was also nominated for an Emmy award for her production design on "American Horror Story". Other notable films include Analyze That and Something's Gotta Give.

== Selected filmography ==
- 1993- Super Mario Bros.
- 1993- Romeo is Bleeding
- 1994- Baby's Day Out
- 1994- Terminal Velocity
- 1995- Money Train
- 1996- Sleepers
- 1997- Jungle 2 Jungle
- 1998- Twilight
- 1999- The Cider House Rules Academy Award nomination
- 2001- Original Sin
- 2002- Analyze That
- 2003- Something's Gotta Give
- 2005- The Interpreter
- 2006- World Trade Center
- 2007- American Gangster Academy Award nomination
- 2009- It's Complicated
- 2011- American Horror Story 'Emmy nomination
- 2014- Clementine
- 2015- The Intern
- 2015- Love the Coopers
- 2015-2016- Quantico
- 2017- The Upside
- 2018- The Rookie
- 2018- Midnight Texas
- 2018- Tremors
- 2019-2020- God Friended Me
- 2021-2022- The Equalizer

== Personal Views ==
In discussing designing a home versus a movie set, Rubino says "In a regular residence, you’re creating the top layer of their environment; in a movie we do that but create subtext as well."
