= Judy Farr (set decorator) =

British art director and set decorator

- Other name: Judith Farr
- Occupations: Set decorator and art director
- Years active: 1985-present

Judy Farr is a British art director and set decorator. She was nominated at the 83rd Academy Awards for her work on the film The King's Speech in the category of Best Art Direction. She shared her nomination with Eve Stewart.

In addition, she has been nominated for two Emmy's. For the TV show Downton Abbey and the 1999 mini-series Cleopatra.

== Selected filmography ==
- King Ralph (1991)
- Shine (1996)
- Ever After: A Cinderella Story (1998)
- The Red Violin (1999)
- The Brothers Grimm (2005)
- The Water Horse (2007)
- The King's Speech (2010)
- Conan the Barbarian (2011)
- My Week with Marilyn (2011)
- Jack Ryan: Shadow Recruit (2014)
- American Sniper (2014)
