= Bob Shaw (production designer) =

American art director and production designer

- Occupations: Art director, production designer

Bob Shaw is an American art director and production designer. He was nominated for an Academy Award in the category Best Production Design for the film The Irishman.

In addition to his Academy Award nomination, he won three Primetime Emmy Awards and was nominated for six more in the category Outstanding Art Direction for his work on the television programs The Sopranos, Mad Men, Boardwalk Empire and The Gilded Age.

== Selected filmography ==
- The Irishman (2019; co-nominated with Regina Graves)
