= Doug Kraner =

American production designer (??–2016)

Doug Kraner (died April 4, 2016) was an American production designer in the film industry. He was the co-production designer (with Richard Berg) for Gotham (2014). He was an Emmy-nominee in the category of Outstanding Art Direction for a Limited Series/Special for his set decoration on “Little Gloria……Happy at Last” (1983) and Art Directors Guild. Kraner's set designer career began in 1981 with My Dinner with Andre. His works include: Lean on Me, the original Uncle Buck, the beach house in Sleeping with the Enemy and No Place Like Home. He has an MFA degree from the University of Massachusetts Amherst in Scene Design. He was honored by Oscars in Memoriam in 2017. .... (....)(....)
