= Martin Childs =

British production designer

- Born: 1 July 1954 (age 71); Bedford, Bedfordshire, England, UK
- Occupation: Production designer
- Years active: 1985-present

Martin David William Childs MBE (born 1 July 1954), is a British production designer. He won the 1998 Academy Award for Best Art Direction-Set Decoration (jointly with Jill Quertier) for Shakespeare in Love, and was nominated at the 74th Academy Awards for his work on the film Quills. He has also been nominated three times for the Art Directors Guild Award for Excellence in Production Design, and three times for a BAFTA Award for Best Production Design.

In the New Year Honours 2002, Childs was appointed as a Member of the Most Excellent Order of the British Empire for his services to the film industry as a production designer.

== Filmography ==
Production Designer of

- W.E. (2011)
- The Boy in the Striped Pyjamas (2008)
- Miss Potter (2006)
- Lady in the Water (2006)
- Chasing Liberty (2004)
- Calendar Girls (2003)
- From Hell (2001)
- Quills (2000)
- The Clandestine Marriage (1999)
- Shakespeare in Love (1998)
- Mrs. Brown (1997)
