= Richard Hoover (set designer) =

Richard T. Hoover is an American set designer, production designer, and art director for theater, television, and film. He won the 1999 Tony Award for Best Scenic Design for Tennessee Williams's play Not About Nightingales which premiered at the Royal National Theater under the direction of Trevor Nunn on March 5, 1998., and for which he won the Evening Standard nd Critic's Circle awards in London. In the film industry, he has designed 50 feature films, with more than 70 total screen credits across film, television movies, shorts and series. He is best known for his work on David Lynch's and Mark Frost's television show Twin Peaks.

== Early life and education ==
Richard M. Hoover was born in 1946 and grew up in the Chciago area. He found the theater in his high school years and worked at local theater as a technician and actor. He received his undergraduate degree from Knox College in 1969 in the study of directing and stage design and did his graduate studies at Smith College and then at the University of Minnesota as a McKnight Fellow which was tied to a year and half apprenticeship at The Guthrie Theater under the guidance of designer John Jenson. In Minneapolis he began designing for such theaters as The Guthrie 2, The Cricket Theater, The Chimera Theater, and The Theater In The Round.(1971-1973). He moved to New York City in 1973 and began studies at the Lester Polikov School of Scenic Painting as well as fine art training at the Art Student's League.

== Theater ==
While Hoover's design career began in Minneapolis his move to New York presented opportunities for further in early off Broadway and regional theater productions. He met director Stephan Katz which began a collaboration for designs for the New York Theater Workshop (Fantod), The Geva Theater in Rochester New York (How I Got that Story), and at Stage West in Springfield, Massachusetts (Chekov Shorts).

While in Los Angeles, Hoover met Tim Robbins and shortly joined The Actor's Gang. As a member for 10 years, he designed many productions and helped develop a new performance space in Hollywood. In Los Angeles he as well continued designing for other theaters such as the Mark Taper Forum, The Metro Theater, The Open Fist Theater, The IAMA Theater, the Geffen Playhouse, The Old Globe Theater, and The Pasadena Playhouse all while maintaining work in the film industry.

In 1997, he was asked to design a film for director Trevor Nunn. While the film did not happen, this gave Hoover an opportunity to present his stage work to Mr. Nunn. In December of that year, he received a copy of a type-written script for the then unknown Tennessee Williams play, Not About Nightingales, which was to be produced at the Royal National theater in London. For the play, he designed a two-story metal prison with a metal floor set in traverse at the Cottesloe at The National. In London Hoover received the Evening Standard Award for best design (1998). The play then transferred to the Houston Alley Theater and then onto Broadway at the Circle In the Square. in 1999 Hoover was awarded the Tony award for best stage design. fThe New York Times described Hoover's design as an "intense, vivid production" when it opened in February 1999.

He continues work both in film and theater having designed Twelfth Night, Hamlet, The Crucible, 39 Steps, Caroline or Change, and Death of a Salesman at The Guthrie Theater, on Broadway, After the Fall for Michael Mayer at The Roundabout Theater, Seven Guitars for Rubin Santiago Hudson at the Signature Theater, Small Engine Repair, Suburbia, Seven Against Thebes for Jo Bonney at the Lucile Lortel Theater, Coal Country at The Public Theater for Jessica blank and Erik Jensen.

== Activism ==
In 1974, after the American Indian Movement(AIM) occupation at Wounded Knee, South Dakota, Hoover joined the Wounded Knee Offense/Defense Committee as a legal volunteer in Sioux Falls, South Dakota. Upon return to New York he became a volunteer researcher for The International Indian Treaty Council (IITC) which was a global organization of indigenous peoples from North, Central, and South America working to lobby the United Nations for non governmental status. In 1976 he, along with Paul Chat Smith (Comanche and then future associate curator at the National Museum of the American Indian), formed a video unit to make a documentary during an AIM educational treaty conference held at the Yankton reservation in South Dakota. This documentary, We Are The Evidence of This Western Hemisphere, brought Hoover into the growing independent film community in New York.

== Film ==
In the New York film industry he worked as a production assitant to director Dan Chaykin for the George Schlatter tv show Real People. In that period, while still designing for theater, Hoover met designers Charles Bennett and Lilly Kilvert who introduced him to the world of film production design. Ms Kilvert engaged him as an art director on the film The Doorman, a thriller shot in Manhattan and then invited him to art direct the Rob Reiner film The Sure Thing in Los Angeles and Stockton, California (1985). It was on this production where he met Tim Robbins who was in th eprocess of forming the Actor's Gang theater. In hollywood he designed his first larger film, It Takes Two, for director David Beaird. In September, 1989, Hoover attended the Telluride Film Festival where he saw the pilot for Twin Peaks. In the following week, at the invitation ofl writer Mark Frost, he met David Lynch and was hired to design the first and second seasons of the series. This was Hoover's first dive into television series production.

He began working in film in 1982. Other film credits as production designer include It Takes Two (1988), Prime Target (1989), and Girl, Interrupted (1999), Payback, 42, and Finestkind for Brian Helgeland, Enlightened and Brad's Status for Mike White, Newsroom for Aaron Sorkin, and Live From Baghdad for which he was nominated for an Emmy award and won best single camera award for the Art Directors Guild.

His recent work includes the 2020 television miniseries The Plot Against America, the 2023 crime thriller Finestkind, Vivien and The Florist, and the documentary/drama The Idea Factory about the discoveries made at the early Bell Labs.

Currently, Hoover is writing screen plays and has been taking acting classes.
