= Derek R. Hill =

American production designer

Derek Hill is an American production designer. Hill has numerous feature films and Emmy nominated television series to his credit and collaborated with such acclaimed directors as Antoine Fuqua, Kevin Costner, Oliver Stone, Sean Penn, Gore Verbinski, Joe and Anthony Russo, Kevin Reynolds, Bruce Beresford and Jason Bateman to name a few. He has also been honored with several Emmy nominations for his designs on television and recognition for his feature films such as Ozark, The Gifted, All Eyez on Me, The Magnificent Seven, Southpaw, Surviving Compton, Cleveland Abduction, The Forger, Olympus Has Fallen, Hatfields & McCoys, Community, Bonnie & Clyde, Happy Endings, Into the Wild, Extraordinary Measures, W., House, M.D., What About Brian, Pirates of the Caribbean: The Curse of the Black Pearl, Any Given Sunday, Three Kings, Hurlyburly, The Postman, and JFK.
