= Costalegre =

- Beach
- From top, left to right: Cabo Corrientes; Costa Majahuas; Bahía de Chamela; Costa Careyes; Bahía de Tenacatita and Tamarindo Beach

- Seal
- Nicknames: The Virgin Coast, Joy Coast
- Interactive map of Costalegre
- Coordinates: 20°40′N 105°16′W
- Country: Mexico
- State: Jalisco
- Municipality: Cabo Corrientes
- Municipality: Tomatlán
- Municipality: Cihuatlán

Area
  - Municipality: 1,300.7 km^{2} (502.19 sq mi)
- Elevation: 7.0 m (23 ft)

Population (2005)
  - Total: 177,830
  - Municipality: 220,368
- Demonym: Jaliciense
- Time zone: UTC-6 (CST)
- Postal code: 48300
- Area code: 322
- Website: costalegre.com

Costalegre ("Coast of Joy" in Spanish) is a series of different beaches, capes and bays of various sizes distributed alongside the Pacific Ocean on the western coastline of the Mexican state of Jalisco, between Puerto Vallarta, Jalisco and Manzanillo, Colima.

== History ==
The Spanish used Bahía de Navidad for ship building, repairs, and as a jumping off point to the Philippines in the mid-16th century.

During President Ávila Camacho's administration (1940–1946), Mexico launched a vigorous campaign to attract U.S. and international tourists. Under the leadership of Miguel Alemán and Alejandro Buelna, the government utilized press, radio, and film, alongside promotional exhibits and English-narrated travelogues, to advertise Mexico's attractions.

By the 1950s, these efforts significantly boosted tourism, with 95% of visitors being U.S. residents. Infrastructure improvements, such as highways and airports, further facilitated travel, with air travel emerging as a key factor.

Since 1970, tourism has become a vital sector of Mexico's economy, ranking as the second-largest employer and consistently among the top three earners of foreign exchange. Mexico leads Latin America in tourism exports, reflecting the global trend of tourism becoming one of the fastest-growing and economically significant industries.

Since the 1990s, the Jalisco state government has promoted this zone as a tourist attraction, grouping all these beaches under the common name of "Costalegre".

=== Hurricane Patricia ===
On October 23, 2015, Costalegre was hit by the category 5 storm Hurricane Patricia, which was the most powerful cyclone ever measured in the Western Hemisphere with sustained wind speeds of up to 320 km/h (200 mph). Hurricane Patricia made landfall October 23 at 7:45pm with catastrophic damage. The center of the storm hit Cuixmala in Costalegre.

== Ecotourism in Costalegre ==
=== Recent History ===
The Costalegre region of Mexico is home to a variety of ecological wildlife, terrain and plant species, stretching 330 km along the Pacific coast. Following the end of the Mexican Revolution in 1917, Ejidos (state owned communal farmland for indigenous people and citizens), made up 70% of the land in Costalegre. The Huichols are the primary indigenous group in this region. Both citizens and Huichol alike depend on the Ejido system to grow crops and hunt for food. In 1990, the Mexican government declared this region a "Priority Tourism Development Zone" intending for tourism to increase jobs and create a positive view of the Mexican state. Post pandemic in 2021, Jalisco (Costalegre's Mexican state) saw 18 million visitors bringing an economic impact of 72 million Mexican pesos to the area.

The Mexican government and private investors have committed to developing tourist infrastructure and commercial property in the area. As part of this tourism push, construction of a new international airport, Chalacatepec International Airport, finished in March 2024. Prior to Chalacatepec, Costalegre travelers needed to fly into Puerto Vallarta International Airport (PVR) or Manzanillo International Airport (MZO). Much of Costalegre's tourism market has been driven and famed for their ecotourism appeal. "Ecotourism" is considered to increase the economic output of an ecologically rich area, without negatively impacting the environment. Despite laws in place to prevent damage to the wildlife, the rise in tourism has coincided with an increase of pollution and disturbance of wildlife in the area. To limit pollution and clean these areas, officials frequently close beaches off entirely to both tourists and local citizens alike. Land once used as public ejidos have more recently been re-zoned for new tourism development at a higher rate, resulting in a higher volume of luxury houses/resorts and less land for Indigenous Mexican industry (cattle raising, fishing, agriculture).

==== Xala ====
Mexico's newest low-density development, Xala, is located 100 km south of Puerto Vallarta and is in close proximity to the new Chalacatepec International Airport. The development, funded by both the Mexican government and private investor has a $1 billion price tag and plans to create 75 ranch houses, 25 hotel residences and a variety of tourist amenities including a spa according to Bloomberg. The project page states that Six Senses, will operate an additional 51 hotel suites, 44 residences and a variety of tourist amenities including a spa, waterfront clubs and pools. Ricardo Santa Cruz, managing director for the project, has pledged 20% of the project's acres to forest reforestation and considers the project a "unique residential community."

==== Chamela ====
Chamela is a coastal town located North of Manzanillo. Chamela is home to the Chamela-Cuixmala Biosphere Reserve, a privately held plot of land designated to study and protect the extensive wildlife and tropical forest. The National Autonomous University of Mexico's Chamela Biological Station has been conducting research in the area since 1971. The Chamela-Cuixmala region saw its first tourist developments in 1972 after the completion of the Coastal highway of the State of Jalisco (Now Mexican Federal Highway 200), which connected the Costalegre coastal towns. From 1970 onward this region saw frequent tourism development proposals from private companies, which have largely been contested due to the protected environment and ejido zoning of the land. Most recently in 2010, the Ministry of Environment and Natural Resources green lit the tourism development of Zafiro, a 2,250 acre privatization of land along the Chamela coastline. The area is still under development as of 2024, with the original plan clearing 640 acres of forest for residential developments. The National Autonomous University of Mexico contested this development based on its negative environmental impacts and effect on "local social-ecological systems", along with the area's "low forest vegetation" and presence of indigenous peoples.

==== Tenacatita ====
In 2010, Playa de Tenacatita, a town just north of Manzanillo in Costalegre was subject to a property ownership dispute, which resulted in the forced removal of Tenacatita residents by armed Mexican police. The land dispute goes back to the colonial era, in which after Mexican secession from Spain, private land was made into public ejidos. Tenacatita was conceded by the Mexican government to real estate development company, Rodenas, and on August 4, 2010, Rodenas ordered the removal of all residents living on this land. Company owner, Jose Maria Andres Villalobos, is said to have exclaimed to press his intent to remove existing businesses and build a luxury resort on this land. Firsthand accounts of the eviction state authorities "had guns and gave people five minutes to get their stuff and go” and detail "everybody losing everything- their livelihood, their homes. And that was it. And then they put up these fences and gate. " The beach remained under Rodenas control until 2012 where the federal government did not renew the concession and reopened the beach to the public. Under Jalisco governor Aristóteles Sandoval Díaz, in 2015 the governor issued the removal of private security facilitating operations at the beach, returning it to the hands of the state police. Public access to the beach has been restored as of 2015, but business owners and residents living in the area prior to the displacement have not been permitted to return.

== Costalegre Bays and Beaches ==
=== Bahía de Banderas (Flag's Bay) ===
Officially, not a part of Costalegre itself, but separates Puerto Vallarta from the rest of the coast, and marks the northernmost point of Costalegre.

=== Cabo Corrientes (Cape of Currents) ===
Founded in 1944, Cabo Corrientes is a Municipality with over 80 kilometers of scenic highways and 200.106 hectares of forest surrounded by rivers and cascades. Some of its beaches are already very well known due to its proximity to Puerto Vallarta, like Las Ánimas, Quimixto and Yelapa, often considered as part of Vallarta by the tourists, but which are in fact just a minor part of the large Cabo Corrientes's coast. The Tuito is the municipal head of Cabo Corrientes and the oldest population of the municipality. It is located 40 km (25 miles) south of Puerto Vallarta. The ruins of the Ex-Hacienda San José are an attraction that dates from 1875; as well as the ancient petroglyphs in Las Juntas and Los Veranos.

In Boca de Tomatlán, pangas (taxi boats) take tourists to the beaches.

Las Ánimas — is a sand beach in a zone suitable for diving, with coral formations and the associated marine fauna.

Quimixto — Between Quimixto and Yelapa there are small beaches such as Las Caletas, Majahuitas and Colimilla. S with coral formations and the associated marine fauna.

Yelapa — A large creek where the Tuito river ends. It has a small and traditional town.

Mayto — More than 15 kilometers of beach. Here is located one of the largest of Mexico's protected sea turtles reproduction fields, part of the international Sea Turtle Restoration Project where guided routes are offered to know a little more about the species that arrive at this beach. On scheduled times, it is possible to participate in the release of newborn turtle babies to the sea.

Tehuamixtle — A place known for its large oysters, has a beach about 200 meters long.

=== Costa Majahuas ===
A long coast with several beaches: Punta Las Peñitas, Hotelito Desconocido, Majahuas, Peñitas y Chalacatepec.

Chalacatepec — is a beach 25 minutes from the municipal head of Tomatlán. On its shore there is a pirate ship wrecked long ago which now forms part of the traditional legends of the place. La Peñita Pintada — (Painted Lil'Rock) gained its name due to a natural granodiorite cavity, whose walls, bottom and ceiling have several ancient paintings on them. Owing to the large number of visitors, there are visitor periods scheduled only on specific times of the year.

=== Bahía de Chamela ===
A large, undeveloped bay surrounded by several islands. Home to marine and terrestrial birds, it has more than ten kilometers of varied marine and fluvial scenes. It has an assembly of small islands like La Colorada, Cocinas, San Andrés, Pajarera (reserve of exotic birds and ideal place for diving), Novilla, Esfinge, San Pedro, San Agustín, and La Negrita, all of them accessible by boat.

=== Costa Careyes ===
Costa Careyes is a private community located on the South Coast of Jalisco on Highway 200 Melaque – Puerto Vallarta at Kilometer 53. There are several beaches in the Careyes Bay. Teopa Beach is the largest and includes a sea turtle preservation sanctuary^{[1]}. The community was founded in 1968 by Gian Franco Brignone^{[2]} as his private estate. The Castles, Villas, Casitas, Bungalows and Restaurants that comprise Careyes today function as a resort and are known for the "Careyes Style" of architecture.

=== Cuixmala ===
Cuixmala is 10 minutes south Careyes, in the vegetation of a 3 km beach. It was the private estate of James Goldsmith, and was originally conceived as a private home for his family and friends. It has 25,000 acres (100 km^{2}) of land, lagoon and beaches. Originally designed by Robert Couturier, it is now an eco-resort based on green culture.

=== Bahía de Tenacatita ===
Some kilometers ahead of Tamarindo Beach, it is located Bahía de Tenacatita, one of largest bays of the Mexican Coast. This zone has crab, snail, clam, lobster and squid fishing, according to the time of the year. Both sunrise and sunset can be seen over the sea during winter. It has seven beaches: Manzanilla, Boca de Iguanas, Los Ángeles Locos, Punta Serena, Tenacatita and Tecuán.

=== Bahía de Navidad ===
This is the most urban developed bay, located at the south of Costalegre series of beaches. It has a traditional town named Barra de Navidad with a population of 7000+, a small farming and fishing community located on the east end of the Bahía de Navidad, 60 km north of Manzanillo. The beachfront fronting the sandbar arcs toward San Patricio, Jalisco 4.5 kilometers to the west.

The large lagoon behind Barra de Navidad is criss-crossed by small fishing boats gathering scallops and transporting visitors and locals from Barra to Isla Navidad and the Grand Bay Hotel, recently voted the Number One hotel/resort in Mexico by the Travel Channel. Taxi boats also carry passengers to and from the small community of Colimilla where restaurants line the shore.

Melaque — Towards the northwest of Bahía de Navidad, is the extensive beach of Melaque, of smooth surge, regular slope and sand of texture average gilded gray color. Melaque is conformed by the towns of San Patricio and Villa Obregón, this last one also has its own series of small beaches known as "Beaches of the Sun". The locality of San Patricio takes its name from the Irish Saint Patrick, and celebrates him on Saint Patrick's Day, 17 March.

Cuastecomate — A beach of fine gray sand that extends throughout 250 meters.

Tamarindo is a peninsula in the middle of the Pacific Ocean. It has a professional 18-hole golf course south of Tenacatitla. A 150-hectares ecological reserve where an extensive variety of animals coexist, including armadillos, iguanas, deer, raccoons and many exotic birds.

== Culture ==
=== Mariachi ===
Mariachi groups are usually hired for festive occasions.

=== Huichol people ===
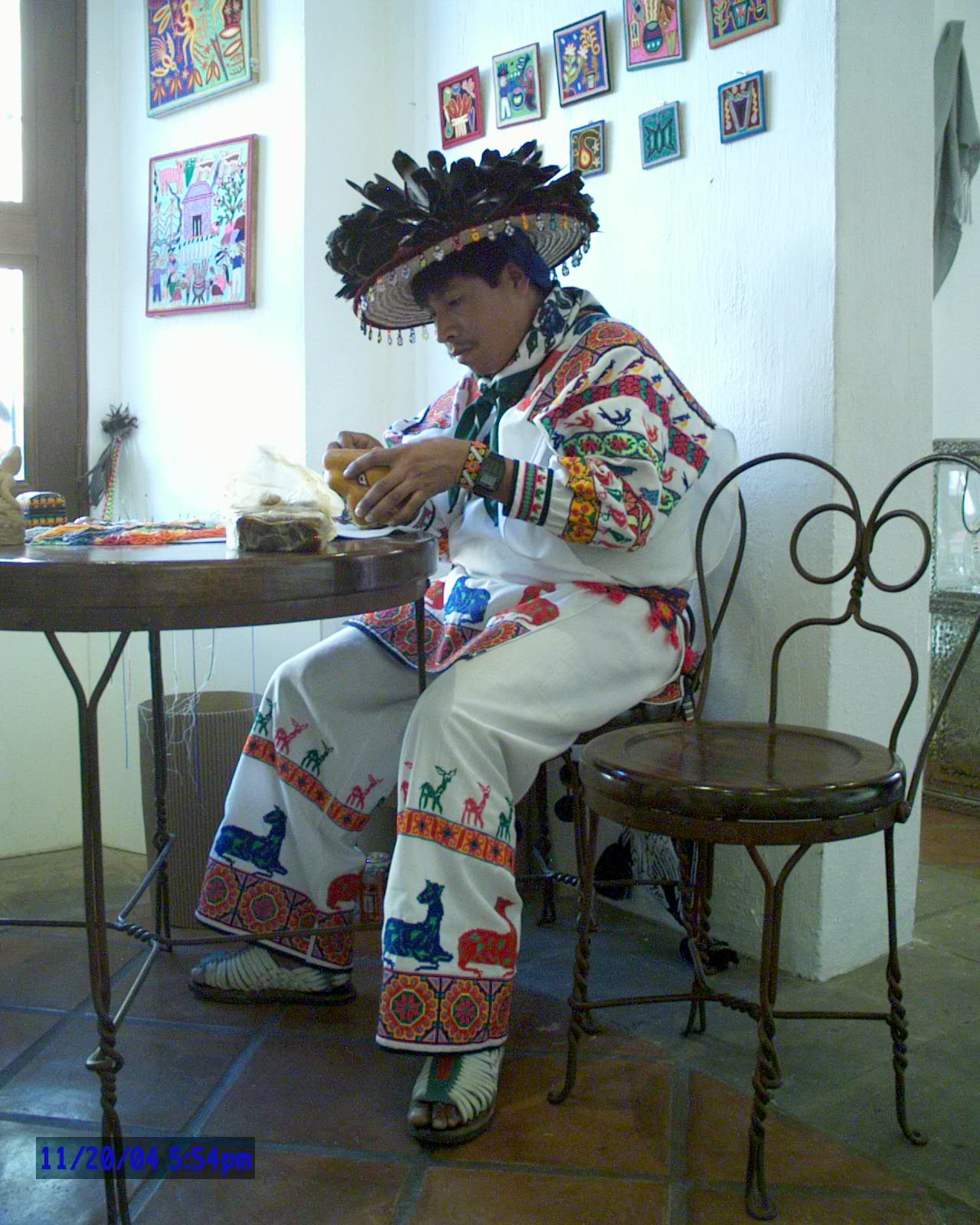
A Huichol artisan in traditional dress.

In the north of Jalisco, the indigenous Huichol people live in towns in mountainous areas that are difficult to access. They call themselves wixarica, "The People," in their own language. The name "Huichol" is derived from the name that was given to them by Nahuatl speakers. Along Costalegre it is possible to find Huichol handmade crafts, drapes and traditional toys.

Related to Nahuatl, the Huichol language belongs to the Coracholan branch of the Uto-Aztecan language family.

== Gastronomy ==
=== Drinks ===
Jalisco is the center of the Mexican tequila industry. The areas in Jalisco that are covered in volcanic soil are utilised for the cultivation of the blue agave plant, which is used as the base for alcohols such as tequila.

Traditional alcoholic drinks Aguamiel and Pulque are made from maguey, similar to the plants used to produce tequila.

Along the streets of the town street vendors sell Tejuino, a cold beverage made from fermented corn. Tepache is also found on these places, a drink made out of the flesh and rind of the pineapple, sweetened with brown sugar and cinnamon. Both are slightly fermented and have a minimal alcohol content.

=== Traditional food ===
Dishes of Jalisco include Birria, (a spicy meat stew, made of goat, cow or iguana meat), red or white pozole, sopes, guacamole, frijoles charros, Menudo (stew made of hominy and tripe with a red chili base), torta ahogada (a Mexican sandwich "drowned" in a spicy sauce), Carne en su jugo, Enchiladas rojas y verdes, Cuachala (a chicken or pork stew), tamales, Lamb al pastor. The traditional Yelapa Pie is found only on Yelapa beach. Many kinds of fish and seafood are available in the large coastal region of Costalegre.
