= Boca de Tomatlán =

Village in Jalisco, Mexico

- Village
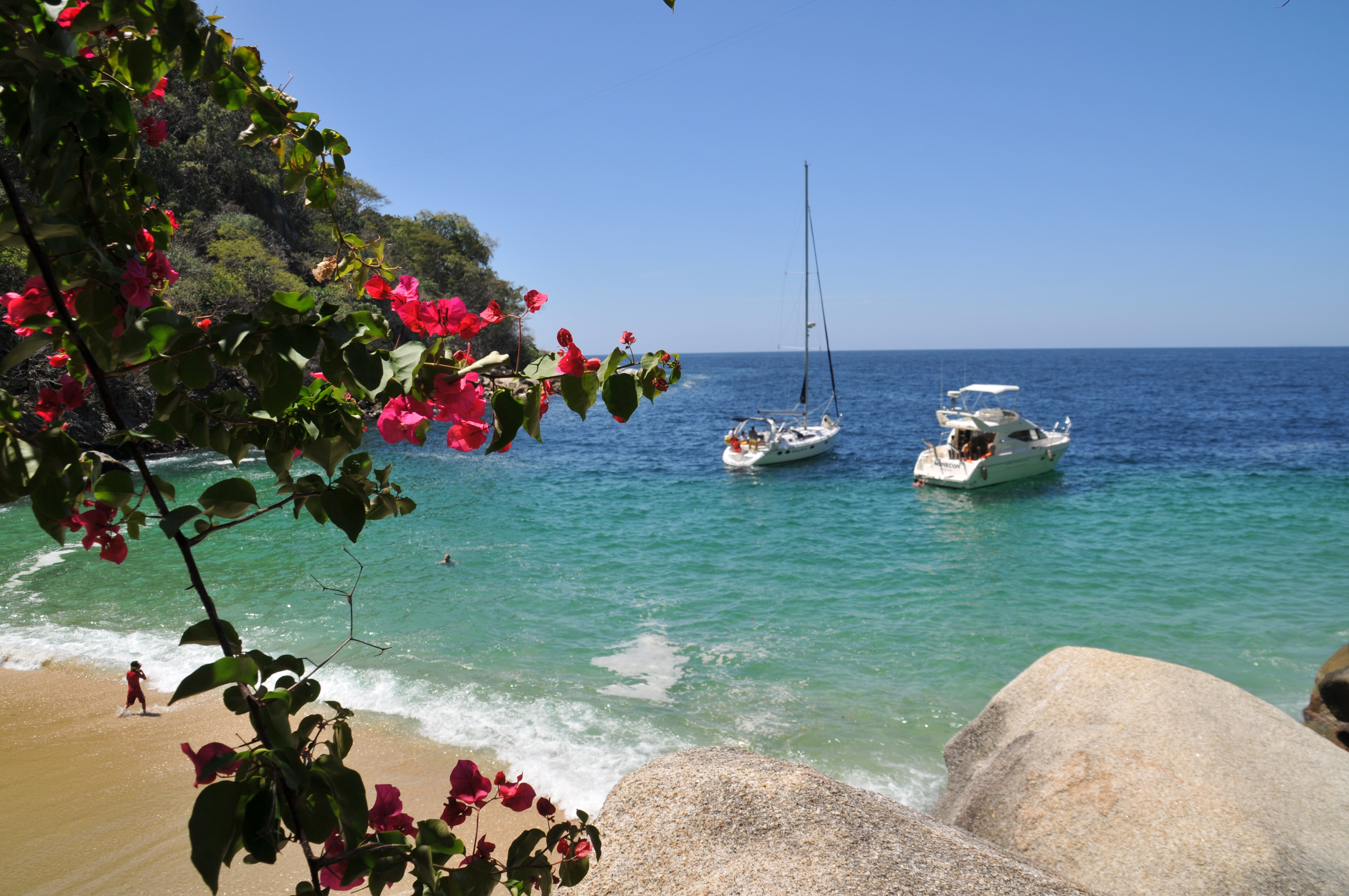
- Boca Beach
- Etymology: Boca = mouth (of a river); Tomatlán = "Tomato land"
- Nickname: Boca
- Location within Jalisco Location within Mexico
- Coordinates: 20°30′43″N 105°18′50″W
- Country: Mexico
- State: Jalisco
- Municipality: Puerto Vallarta
- Founded: 1500s
- Elevation: 21 m (69 ft)

Population (5 August 2014)
  - Total: 661
- Time zone: UTC−6 (Central Central Standard Time)
  - Summer (DST): UTC−6 (Central Standard Time)
- Postal code: 48270
- Area code: +52 322

Boca de Tomatlán, colloquially shortened to Boca, is a small fishing village in the state of Jalisco in Mexico. It is popular with tourists visiting the nearby city of Puerto Vallarta due to its beaches.

== Geography ==
Boca de Tomatlán is located on the southern edge of Bahía de Banderas. It is located about 11 kilometres (6.8 mi) from downtown Puerto Vallarta. The village is located on both sides of the Horcones River, which ends its journey from the Sierra Madre Occidental here.

=== Climate ===
Boca de Tomatlán has a Tropical savannah climate (Köppen climate classification Aw), with dry winters and rainy summers.

The village has a high amount of rainfall from June to October.

=== Nearby settlements ===
- Colomitos
- Las Ánimas
- Las Caletas
- Majahuitas
- Mismaloya
- Playa Caballo
- Puerto Vallarta
- Quimixto
- Yelapa

== Tourism ==
Panga commonly stop by the beach to drop off tourists. In addition, the road to Boca de Tomatlán on Mexican Federal Highway 200 also offers views of Los Arcos National Marine Park. Adventure tour groups also pass through Boca, with the most prominent being Los Veranos Canopy Tour. The beach usually has small seaside restaurants serving seafood.

People mainly come to this area to see the wildlife as well, with whale watching tours being offered from November to March. Parrots, egrets, herons, pelicans, hummingbirds, seagulls, and frigatebirds all frequent the area, making it a popular place for birdwatching.
