= Costalegre Airport =

Chalacatepec Airport Aeropuerto de Costalegre
- IATA: none; ICAO: none; LID: COJ

Summary
- Airport type: Public
- Operator: Jalisco State Government
- Serves: Costalegre
- Location: Tomatlán municipality
- Elevation AMSL: 46 ft / 14 m
- Coordinates: 19°43′07″N 105°13′56″W

Map
- Location of the airport in Quintana Roo COJ (Mexico)

Runways
Direction	Length		Surface
Direction	ft	m	Surface
14/32	7,218	2,200	Asphalt
- AFAC

Costalegre Airport or Chalacatepec Airport (AFAC: COJ) is an airport located in Tomatlán municipality in Jalisco and is operated by the Government of the State of Jalisco. Construction began in 2006 with a project for the construction of an airport in the Costalegre area with capacity to receive aircraft of up to 170 passengers and that would begin operations in 2015, however, in 2018 the construction of the airport had to be suspended due to the lack of possession of land that belonged to the José María Morelos Ejido, so its potential opening would also be postponed until 2019. However, the project was resumed until 2022 and by 2023 an investment of almost 95 million pesos (US$4.8 million) had already been made, this with the intention of beginning operations during the year 2024.

The airport was planned to have a 24,062-square-meter aviation apron, three tanks with a capacity of 50,000 liters of jet fuel each and two with a capacity of 20,000 liters of Avgas each. It is also planned to have a control tower, fire station, weather station, maintenance area, baggage storage, and terminal building. Regarding landing aids, the runway will be lit, and there will also be VOR/VHF systems, instrument landing system, and P.A.P.I. lights.

The airport was officially inaugurated on October 3, 2024, by Governor Enrique Alfaro. It features a 10,000-square-meter apron and a 27-space parking lot, a 2,200-meter-long and 45-meter-wide paved runway with turn ramps at both ends, and a terminal building.
