= Los Veranos Canopy Tour =

Zip line system in Puerto Vallarta, Mexico

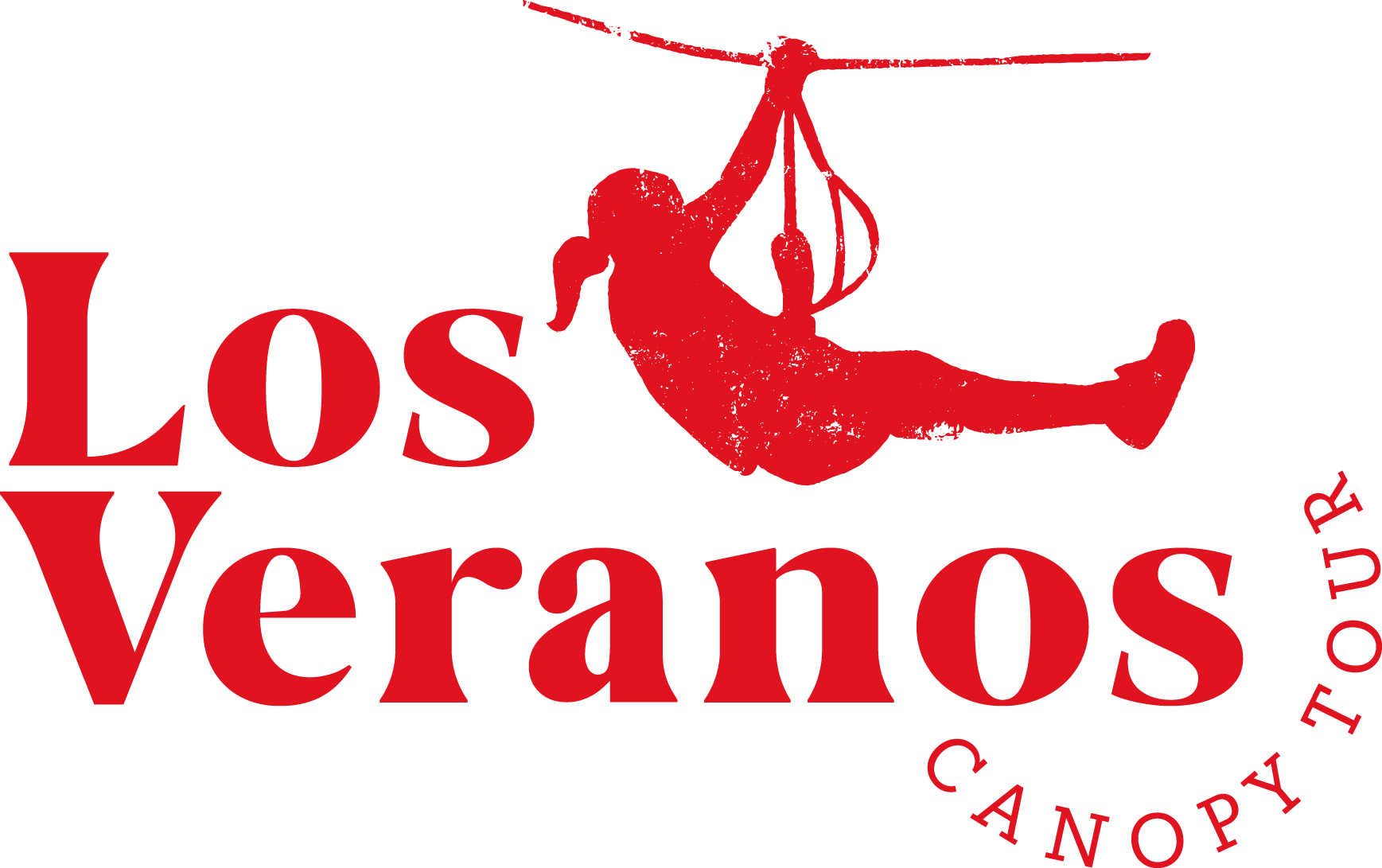

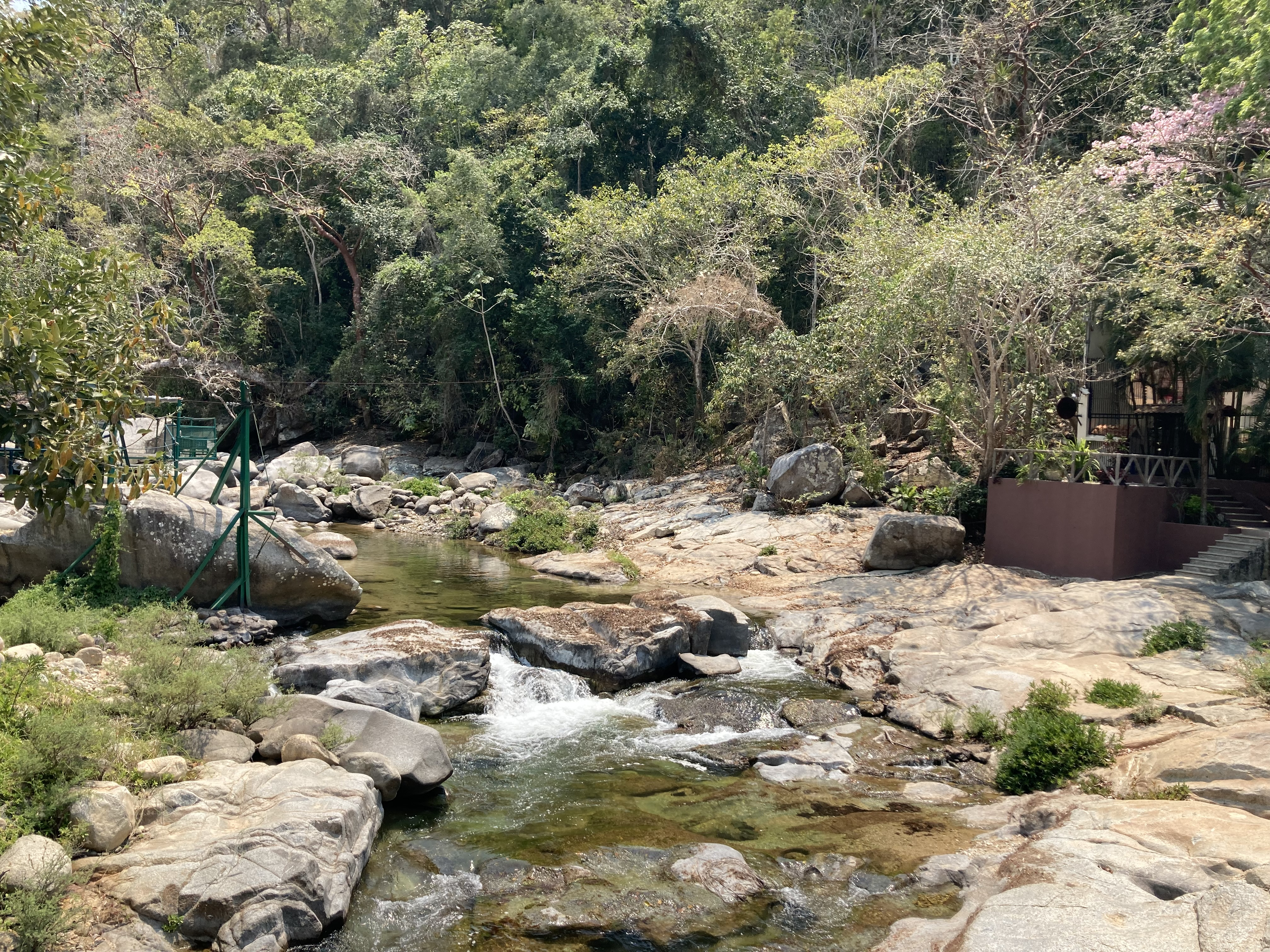
- The area after the final zip line, near the Horcones River
- Interactive map of Los Veranos Canopy Tour
- Location: Boca de Tomatlán, Jalisco, Mexico
- Coordinates: 20.475393°N 105.300289°W
- Status: Operating
- Opened: 2002
- Theme: Adventure

Attractions
- Total: 16 zip lines
- Website: losveranoscanopy.com

Los Veranos Canopy Tour (Spanish for "the summers") is an adventure park nearby Boca de Tomatlán, Jalisco, near the resort city of Puerto Vallarta. It is known for its 16 zip lines spanning over 2 miles (3.2 km), claiming to be the largest canopy system in the world. The system is located in a forest across the Bahía de Banderas near Vallarta, attracting tourists who visit the city.

== History ==
The tour was created by an American family in 2002. Later, an animal sanctuary, restaurant, and massage were also added.

As of 2023, no incidents have occurred during its entire span of operation.

== Zip lines ==
The park contains the following zip lines:

1. Bambino (49.2 feet (15.0 m) long and 49.2 feet (15.0 m) high)
2. Hakuna Matata (295 feet (90 m) long and 65 feet (20 m) high)
3. Hasta La Vista (360 feet (110 m) long and 82 feet (25 m) high)
4. Moctezuma (295 feet (90 m) long and 98 feet (30 m) high)
5. Dancing Tree (377 feet (115 m) long and 98 feet (30 m) high)
6. Chile Piquin (1,230 feet (370 m) long and 197 feet (60 m) high)
7. Black Diamond (1,706 feet (520 m) long and 558 feet (170 m) high)
8. Dos Cojones (1,575 feet (480 m) long and 590 feet (180 m) high)
9. Diablito (70 feet (21 m) long and 10 feet (3.0 m) high)
10. Speedy Gonzales (984 feet (300 m) long and 984 feet (300 m) high)
11. Survivor (495 feet (151 m) long and 66 feet (20 m) high)
12. The Big Enchilada (1,673 feet (510 m) long and 492 feet (150 m) high)
13. Gringo Tree (558 feet (170 m) long and 65 feet (20 m) high)
14. Banana Split (787 feet (240 m) long and 295 feet (90 m) high)
15. Nut Cracker (558 feet (170 m) long and 65 feet (20 m) high)
16. Tequila Screamer (1,378 feet (420 m) long and 20 feet (6.1 m) high; can be a race between two people)

To ride a zip line, one must be under the weight of 285 pounds (129 kg). Children must also be over the age of 5 at least 40 inches (100 cm) tall.

== Other attractions ==
To reach the facility, one must ride on a motorboat across the Bahía de Banderas and then use a bus.

The canopy boasts an animal sanctuary authorized by the Federal Government of Mexico containing species of monkeys, turtles, iguanas, coatis, macaws, toucans, and snakes.

A hiking trail along the Horcones to the Vallarta Botanical Garden is also given. Kayaking and swimming are allowed, and water slides can be found.

In addition, the park offers a restaurant, which sits next to the river and serves traditional Mexican food, pizzas, and hamburgers. Tequila tasting is also provided.
