= Horcones River (Mexico) =

River in Jalisco, Mexico

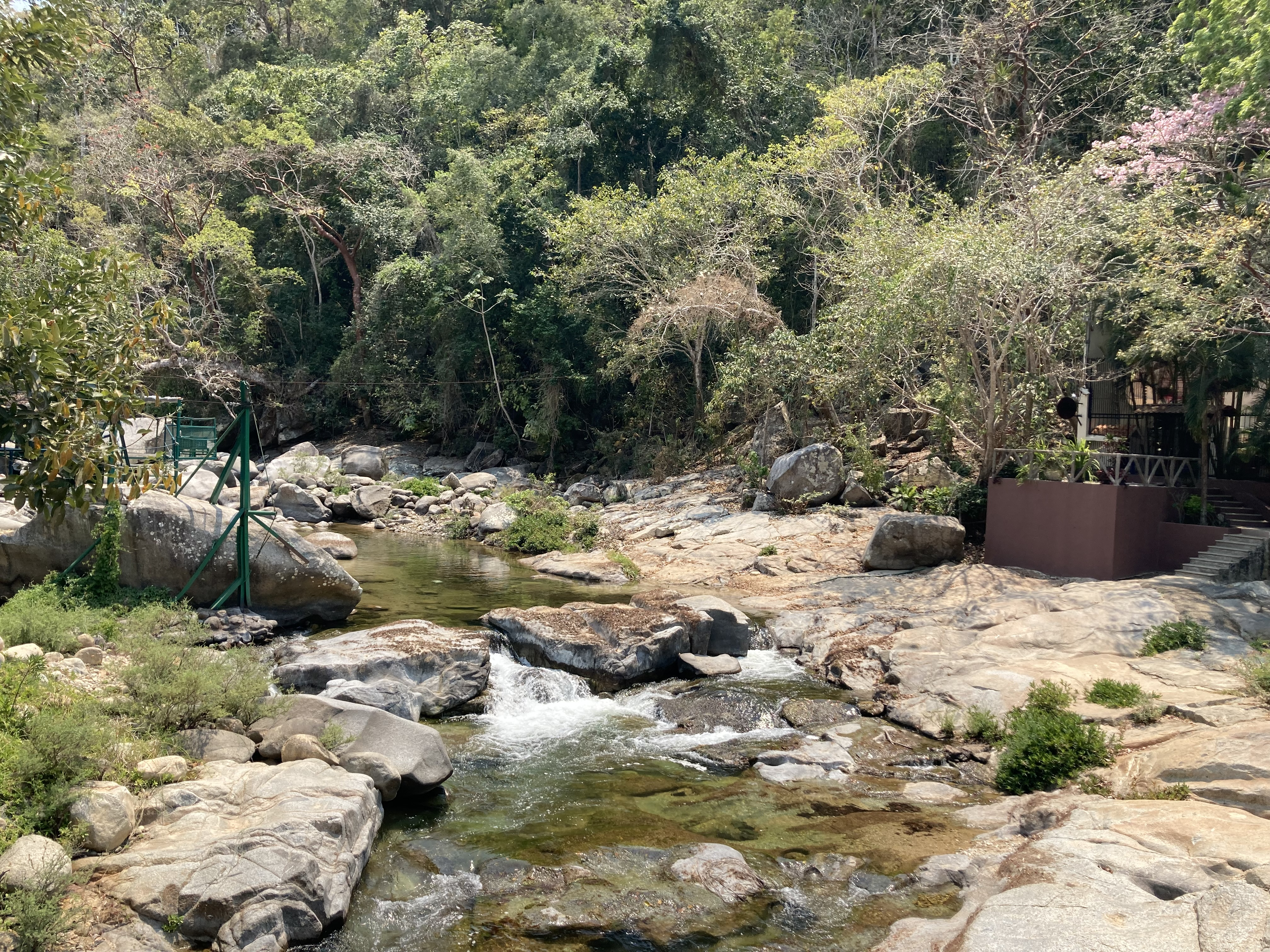
- The river at the end of the Los Veranos Canopy Tour

- Location within Jalisco Location within Mexico
- Native name: Río los Horcones (Spanish)

Location
- Country: Mexico
- State: Jalisco
- City: Boca de Tomatlán

Physical characteristics
- Source: Sierra el Cuale
  - elevation: Over 2,300 m (7,500 ft)
- Mouth: Bahía de Banderas
  - coordinates: 20°30′44″N 105°18′59″W
  - elevation: 21 m (69 ft)

Basin features
- Landmarks: Los Veranos Canopy Tour, Vallarta Botanical Garden

The Horcones River (Río los Horcones in Spanish) is a river in Jalisco, Mexico, near the village of Boca de Tomatlán and city of Puerto Vallarta. Its mouth is the Bahía de Banderas, to which it is a significant source of fresh water. The river forms a canyon.

== Course ==
The river is fairly short, originating in Sierra el Cuale south of Boca and flowing down to the middle of the town. It mainly passes small villages and ranches, but the majority of its course runs through a forest. It does not have any tributaries. Landmarks nearby include Los Veranos Canopy Tour and the Vallarta Botanical Gardens.

== Wildlife ==
Animals that can be found in or close to the river include Neotropical otters and jaguars. Rare species of orchids are also found on its banks.

== Threats ==
The river and its canyon are endangered by a hydroelectric dam which is planned to be created in the future. Banderas News speculates that the dam is just a front for what the government plans to do with it, which is rerouting the river into a large pipe for private use. However, an online petition by residents that would ask for conservation efforts and restrict its use for real estate has been signed by over 800,000 people.

The Horcones is one of the last significant free-flowing rivers in its area, and a dam would cause a change in salt and nutrient levels that are necessary for Bahía de Banderas' sea life.
