= National Tequila Fair =

The Mexican National Tequila Fair is held every year since 1977 in Tequila, Jalisco from November 30 to December 12. It includes parades, charreadas (Mexican rodeos), cock fights, serenades with mariachis, and firework displays.

== See also ==
- The Cabo Corrientes Regional Tequila Fair is held on the last Saturday of November at the Vallarta Botanical Gardens near Puerto Vallarta in the state of Jalisco. While it may be a smaller, more scaled down version of the National Tequila Fair, it is more accessible to residents and visitors of the Bahía de Banderas Area and showcases the local distiliadores of the Cabo Corrientes Region.
- American Whiskey Trail

== Sources ==
- Jalisco: Home & Heart of Tequila
