= The Night of the Iguana (film) =

1964 film by John Huston

- Theatrical release poster by Howard Terpning
- Directed by: John Huston
- Screenplay by: Anthony Veiller; John Huston
- Based on: The Night of the Iguana (1961 play) by Tennessee Williams
- Produced by: Ray Stark
- Starring: Richard Burton; Ava Gardner; Deborah Kerr; Grayson Hall; Cyril Delevanti; Sue Lyon
- Cinematography: Gabriel Figueroa
- Edited by: Ralph Kemplen
- Music by: Benjamin Frankel
- Production company: Seven Arts Productions
- Distributed by: Metro-Goldwyn-Mayer
- Release date: August 6, 1964 (New York City)
- Running time: 125 minutes; 111 minutes (US)
- Country: United States
- Language: English
- Budget: $3 million
- Box office: $12 million

The Night of the Iguana is a 1964 American drama film directed by John Huston, written for the screen by Huston and Anthony Veiller, and based on the 1961 play of the same name by Tennessee Williams. It stars Richard Burton, Ava Gardner, Deborah Kerr, Grayson Hall, Sue Lyon, and Cyril Delevanti.

The film was released by Metro-Goldwyn-Mayer on August 6, 1964. It was nominated for four Academy Awards, including Best Supporting Actress for Grayson Hall, and won for Best Costume Design. It also received five Golden Globe Award nominations - including Best Motion Picture – Drama, Best Director, and Best Actress for Gardner.

== Plot ==
Episcopal clergyman Dr. T. Lawrence Shannon (Burton) suffers a "nervous breakdown" after being ostracized by his congregation and defrocked for having an inappropriate relationship with a "very young Sunday school teacher."

Two years later, Shannon, then a tour guide for the bottom-of-the-barrel Texas company Blake's Tours, is taking a group of Baptist schoolteachers by bus to Puerto Vallarta, Mexico. The group's brittle leader is the stringent Miss Judith Fellowes, who has been entrusted as a chaperone by the parents of Charlotte Goodall, a man-crazy 16-year-old who tries to seduce Shannon. When Charlotte goes to Shannon's hotel room in the middle of the night, Shannon, mindful of past scandals, implores her to leave. Charlotte resists his feeble attempts to expel her, and the vigilant Miss Fellowes catches them together. Fellowes accuses Shannon of trying to seduce Charlotte and declares that she will ruin him.

While approaching the group's hotel in the bus, Shannon suddenly veers off and recklessly drives the terrified passengers to a cheap Costa Verde hotel in Mismaloya, then removes the distributor cap from the engine. The hotel is normally run by an old friend named Fred, but he has died recently and the hotel is now run by his widow, the bawdy and flamboyant Maxine Faulk (Gardner). Shannon convinces Maxine to allow the tour group to stay at the hotel, believing that they will be unable to reach a phone or escape. He enlists Maxine to help him appease the ire of Miss Fellowes, to whom Shannon and Maxine privately attribute a lesbian obsession with her charge. Meanwhile, Charlotte has switched her seductive impulses to Hank, the bus driver, and Miss Fellowes declares she is no longer responsible for Charlotte's behavior though she follows through with her complaints to Blake's Tours regarding Shannon.

Another new arrival at the hotel is Hannah Jelkes (Kerr), a beautiful and chaste middle-aged itinerant painter from Nantucket who is traveling with her 96-year-old poet grandfather, Nonno. They have run out of money, but Shannon convinces Maxine to let them have a room. Over a long night, Shannon battles his weaknesses for both flesh and alcohol. Charlotte continues to make trouble for him, aided by Hank, and Shannon is "at the end of his rope," similar to how an iguana is kept tied by Maxine's cabana boys. Shannon suffers a breakdown, threatening suicide, and the cabana boys truss him in a hammock, while Hannah ministers to him with poppy-seed tea and frank spiritual counsel. Recovering a degree of rationality and making a magnanimous gesture in a savage world, Shannon frees the iguana from its rope.

Hannah's grandfather delivers the final version of the poem that he has been laboring to finish about having heart in a corrupt world and then dies. The characters try to resolve their confused lives. Perceiving the warmth between Shannon and Hannah, Maxine offers to walk away and let them have the hotel, on the condition that Shannon must stay to be valid. Hannah declares to Shannon that the arrangement would be impractical and not work, then leaves to make her own way in life. Shannon and Maxine accept their mutual attraction, and decide to run the hotel together.

== Cast ==
- Richard Burton as the Reverend Dr. T. Lawrence Shannon
- Ava Gardner as Maxine Faulk
- Deborah Kerr as Hannah Jelkes
- Sue Lyon as Charlotte Goodall
- Grayson Hall as Judith Fellowes
- Cyril Delevanti as Nonno
- Mary Boylan as Miss Peebles
- Skip Ward as Hank Prosner
- Gladys Hill as Miss Dexter
- Barbara Joyce as Miss Richards
- Eloise Hardt as Miss Jackson
- Billie Matticks as Miss Throxton
- Fidelmar Durán as Pepe
- C.G. Kim as Chang
- Roberto Leyva as Pedro
- Emilio Fernández as the Barkeep

== Production ==
=== Development and casting ===
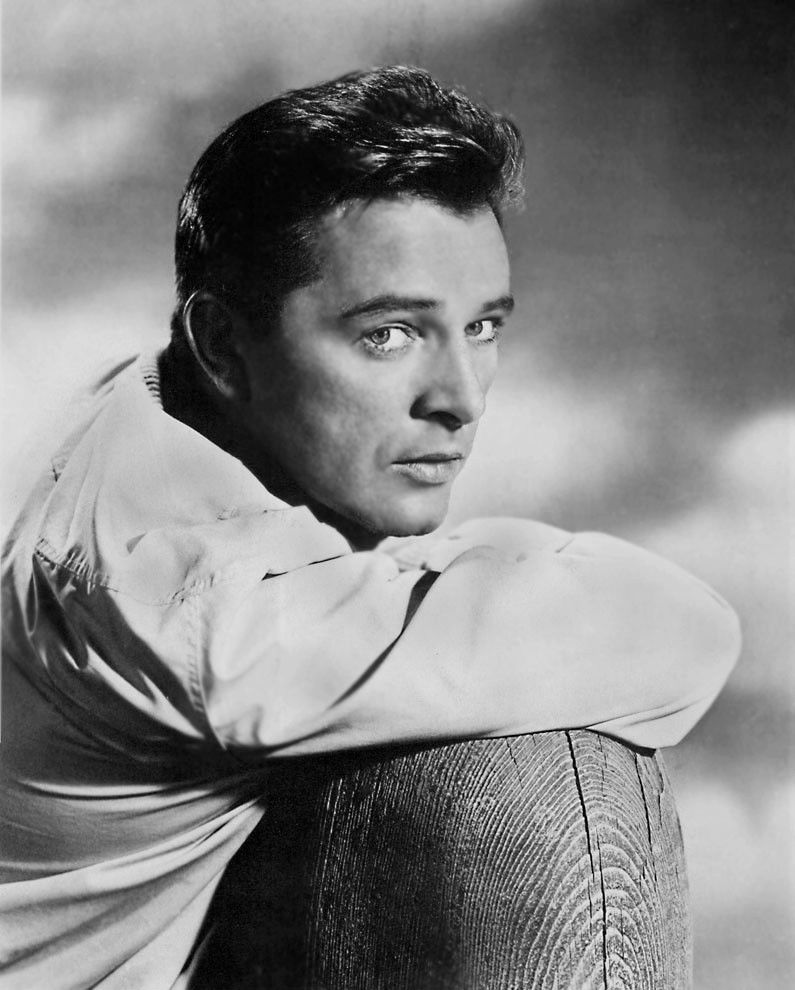
Richard Burton

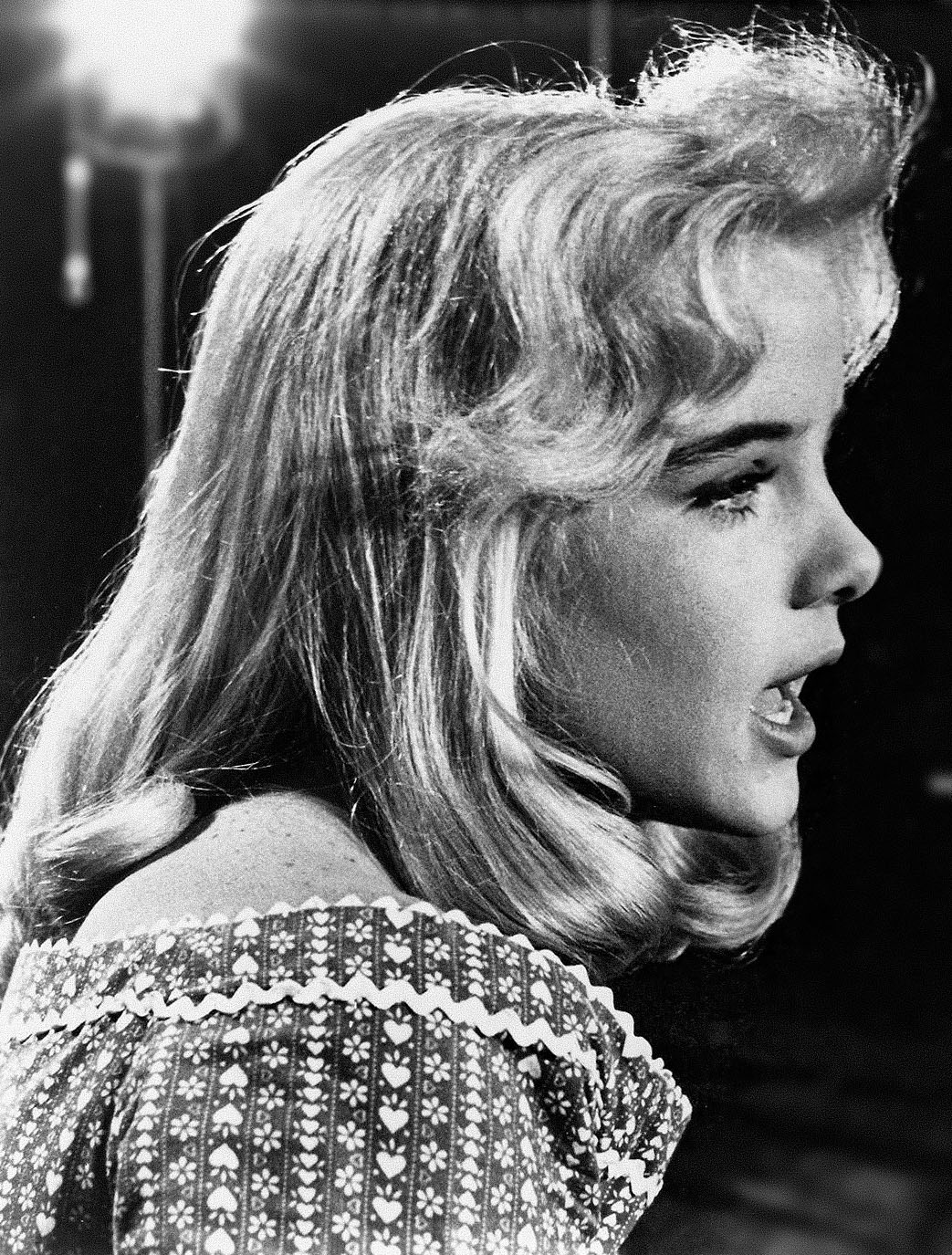
Sue Lyon

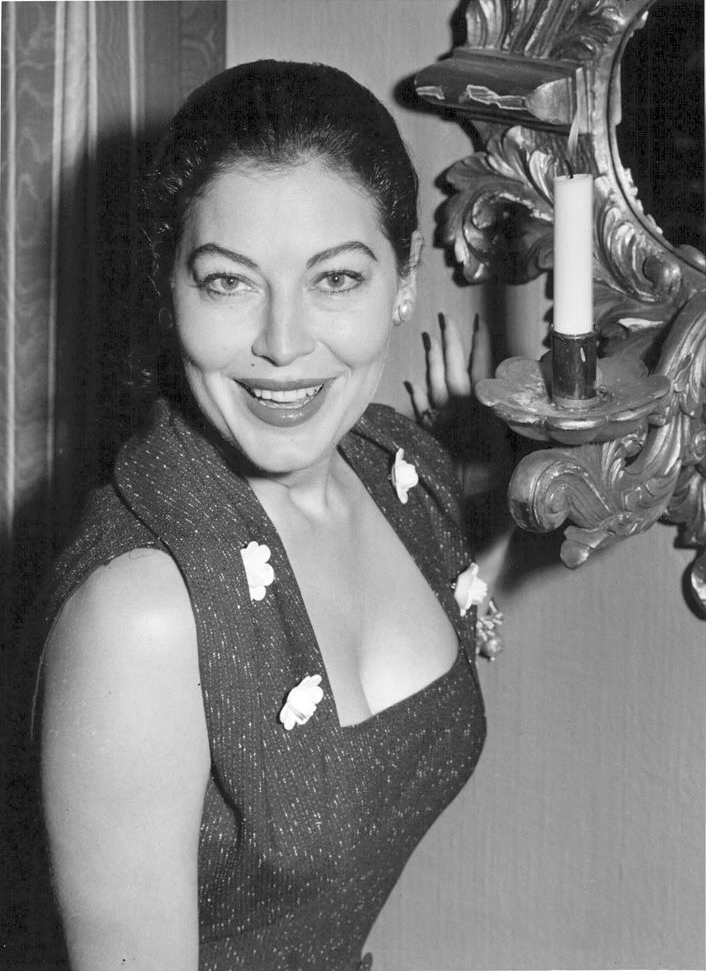
Ava Gardner

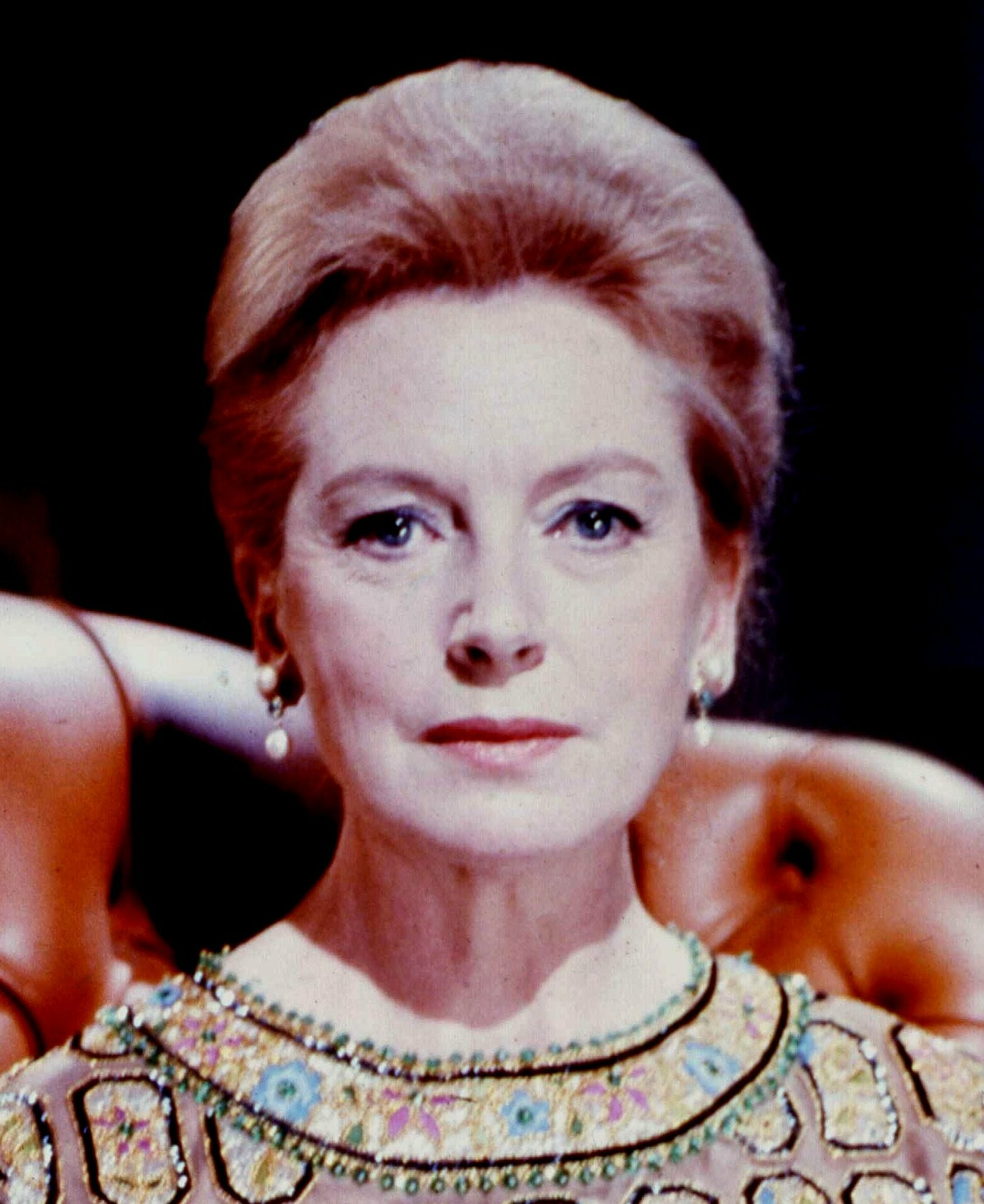
Deborah Kerr

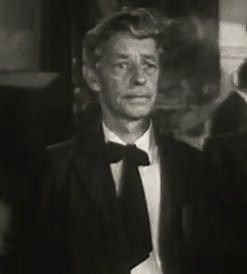
Cyril Delevanti

Early in development, Bette Davis was attached to reprise her role as Maxine Faulk from the 1961 Broadway production, with Ingrid Bergman as Hannah Jelkes and Nancy Kwan in an undisclosed role. Gavin Lambert wrote an early script, before being replaced by John Huston.

James Garner claimed that he was originally offered the role of Dr. Shannon, played by Richard Burton, but he declined because "it was just too Tennessee Williams for me." Christopher Plummer was also considered. Mimsy Farmer screen-tested for the role of Charlotte. After Sue Lyon was cast, the role was expanded from the stage version.

Producer Ray Stark originally wanted Huston, who had just been nominated for a Best Supporting Actor Oscar for The Cardinal, to play the role of Nonno himself. Huston declined so he could focus on directing.

=== Filming ===
In September 1963, Huston, Lyon, and Burton, accompanied by Elizabeth Taylor, arrived at Puerto Vallarta – a "remote little fishing village" – for principal photography in Mismaloya, which lasted 72 days. Huston liked the area's fishing so much that he bought a $30,000 house "in a cottage colony eight miles outside town." Because many of the shooting locations were accessible only by boat, a small village of 25 houses was built as a residence for the cast and crew.

By March 1964, months before the film's release, gossip about the film's production was widespread. Huston later received a Laurel Award for Screenwriting Achievement at the 16th Writers Guild of America Awards for advancing "the literature of the motion picture through the years." At the award dinner, Allan Sherman performed a song to the tune of "Streets of Laredo" with lyrics that included, "They were down there to film The Night of the Iguana / With a star-studded cast and a technical crew. / They did things at night midst the flora and fauna / That no self-respecting iguana would do."

== Trailer ==
In a session overseen by then recording engineer Don LaFontaine, a young, "very nervous", and, in retrospect, instantly recognizable James Earl Jones narrated the film's trailer.

== Reception ==
=== Box office ===
The film grossed $12 million worldwide at the box office. According to Variety it earned $4.5 million in U.S. and Canadian theatrical rentals and was the 10th highest-grossing film of 1964.

=== Critical response ===
Contemporary critical reviews were mixed.

Time magazine's reviewer wrote, "Huston and company put together a picture that excites the senses, persuades the mind, and even occasionally speaks to the spirit—one of the best movies ever made from a Tennessee Williams play."

Bosley Crowther of The New York Times wrote:

Since difficulty of communication between individuals seems to be one of the sadder of human misfortunes that Tennessee Williams is writing about in his play, The Night of the Iguana, it is ironical that the film John Huston has made from it has difficulty in communicating, too. At least, it has difficulty in communicating precisely what it is that is so barren and poignant about the people it brings to a tourist hotel run by a sensual American woman on the west coast of Mexico. And because it does have difficulty—because it doesn't really make you see what is so helpless and hopeless about them—it fails to generate the sympathy and the personal compassion that might make their suffering meaningful.

Crowther was particularly critical of Burton's performance: "Mr. Burton is spectacularly gross, a figure of wild disarrangement, but without a shred of real sincerity. You see a pot-bellied scarecrow flapping erratically. And in his ridiculous early fumbling with the Lolitaish Sue Lyon (whose acting is painfully awkward), he is farcical when he isn't grotesque."

FilmInk called it "perhaps the most delightfully well cast Williams adaptation of them all."

=== Awards and nominations ===
Ceremony	Category	Nominee(s)	Result	Ref.
37th Academy Awards	Best Supporting Actress	Grayson Hall	Nominated	
37th Academy Awards	Best Art Direction – Black-and-White	Stephen B. Grimes	Nominated	
37th Academy Awards	Best Cinematography – Black-and-White	Gabriel Figueroa	Nominated	
37th Academy Awards	Best Costume Design – Black-and-White	Dorothy Jeakins	Won	
18th British Academy Film Awards	Best Foreign Actress	Ava Gardner	Nominated	
17th Directors Guild of America Awards	Outstanding Directorial Achievement in Motion Pictures	John Huston	Nominated	
22nd Golden Globe Awards	Best Motion Picture – Drama	The Night of the Iguana	Nominated	
22nd Golden Globe Awards	Best Actress in a Motion Picture – Drama	Ava Gardner	Nominated	
22nd Golden Globe Awards	Best Supporting Actor – Motion Picture	Cyril Delevanti	Nominated	
22nd Golden Globe Awards	Best Supporting Actress – Motion Picture	Grayson Hall	Nominated	
22nd Golden Globe Awards	Best Director – Motion Picture	John Huston	Nominated	
1965 Laurel Awards	Top Drama	The Night of the Iguana	Nominated	
1965 Laurel Awards	Top Female Dramatic Performance	Ava Gardner	Nominated	
1964 San Sebastián International Film Festival	Best Actress	Ava Gardner	Won	
17th Writers Guild of America Awards	Best Written American Drama	Anthony Veiller, John Huston	Nominated	

== Legacy ==
A statue of John Huston stands in Puerto Vallarta, celebrating the film's role in making the area a popular destination.
