= Los Arcos National Marine Park =

National park in Jalisco, Mexico

- IUCN category II (national park)
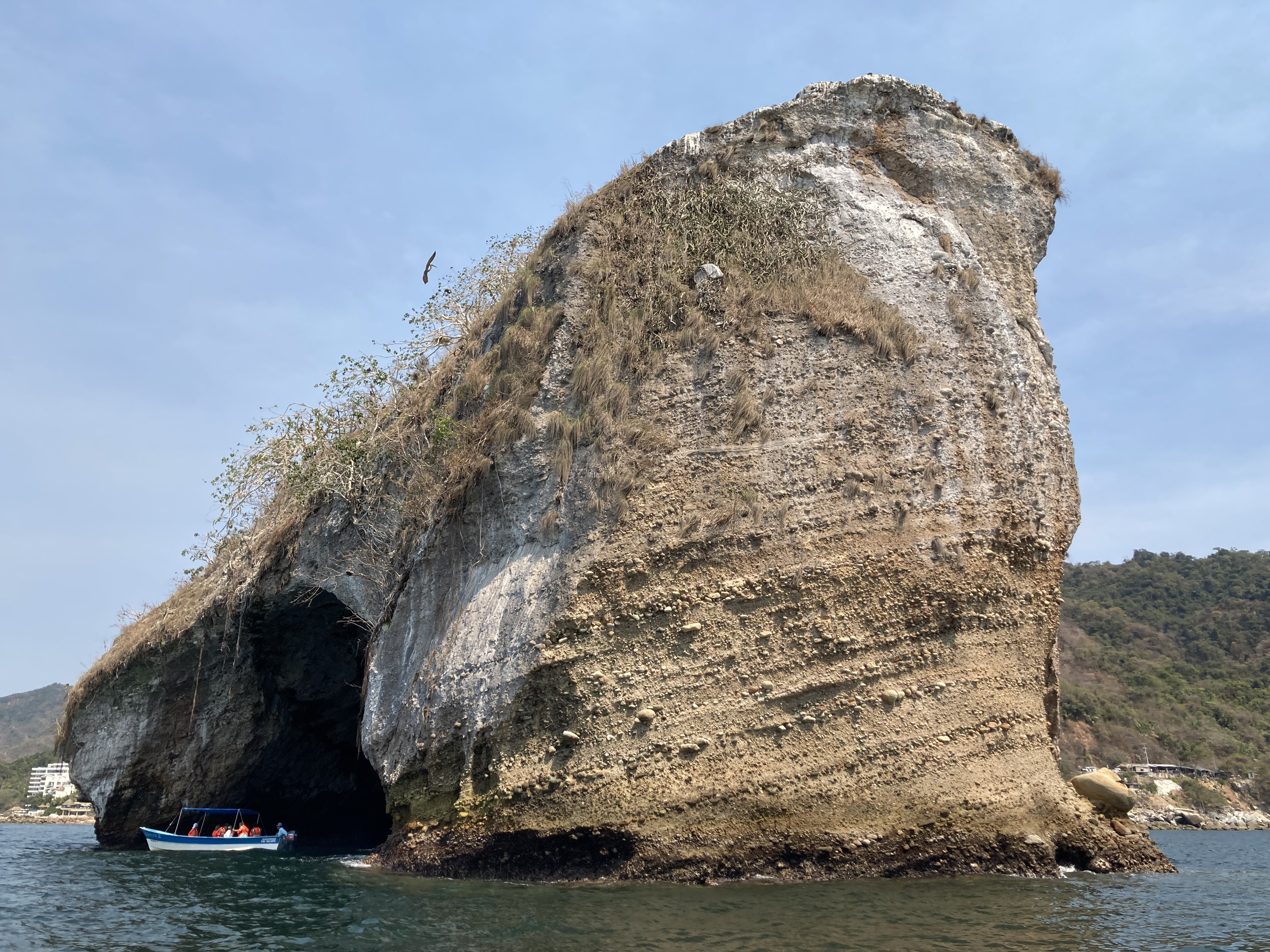
- An unnamed arch

- Location within Jalisco Location within Mexico
- Location: Mexico; Jalisco
- Nearest city: Puerto Vallarta
- Coordinates: 20.545182°N 105.292249°W
- Length: Largest islet is 250 m (820 ft)
- Width: Largest islet is 160 m (520 ft)
- Area: Largest islet is 40,000 m (130,000 ft)
- Elevation: Two largest islets are 43–54 m (141–177 ft) above sea level
- Established: 1984
- Named for: The arches in the park
- Governing body: National Commission of Protected Natural Areas

Los Arcos National Marine Park is a national marine park in Mexico. It is located in the Bahía de Banderas, near the settlements of Puerto Vallarta and Mismaloya. The arches themselves are called Los Arcos de Mismaloya, "the Mismaloya Arches" in Spanish. The islets and below is home to many types of wildlife, from birds to sea turtles.

== History ==
Before becoming islets, the arches were hills part of the Sierra Madre Occidental, near the coast. The ocean gradually eroded the hills with granite centers, exposing them while also dividing them from the mainland.

The Secretary of Commerce and Industrial Development declared in 1975 that the area was to be a Refuge Area for the Protection of Marine Flora and Fauna, and in 1984 it was reclassified to be a National Marine Park. It was declared a Refuga Area due to the extensive reef damage and overfishing the area was suffering to.

== Description ==
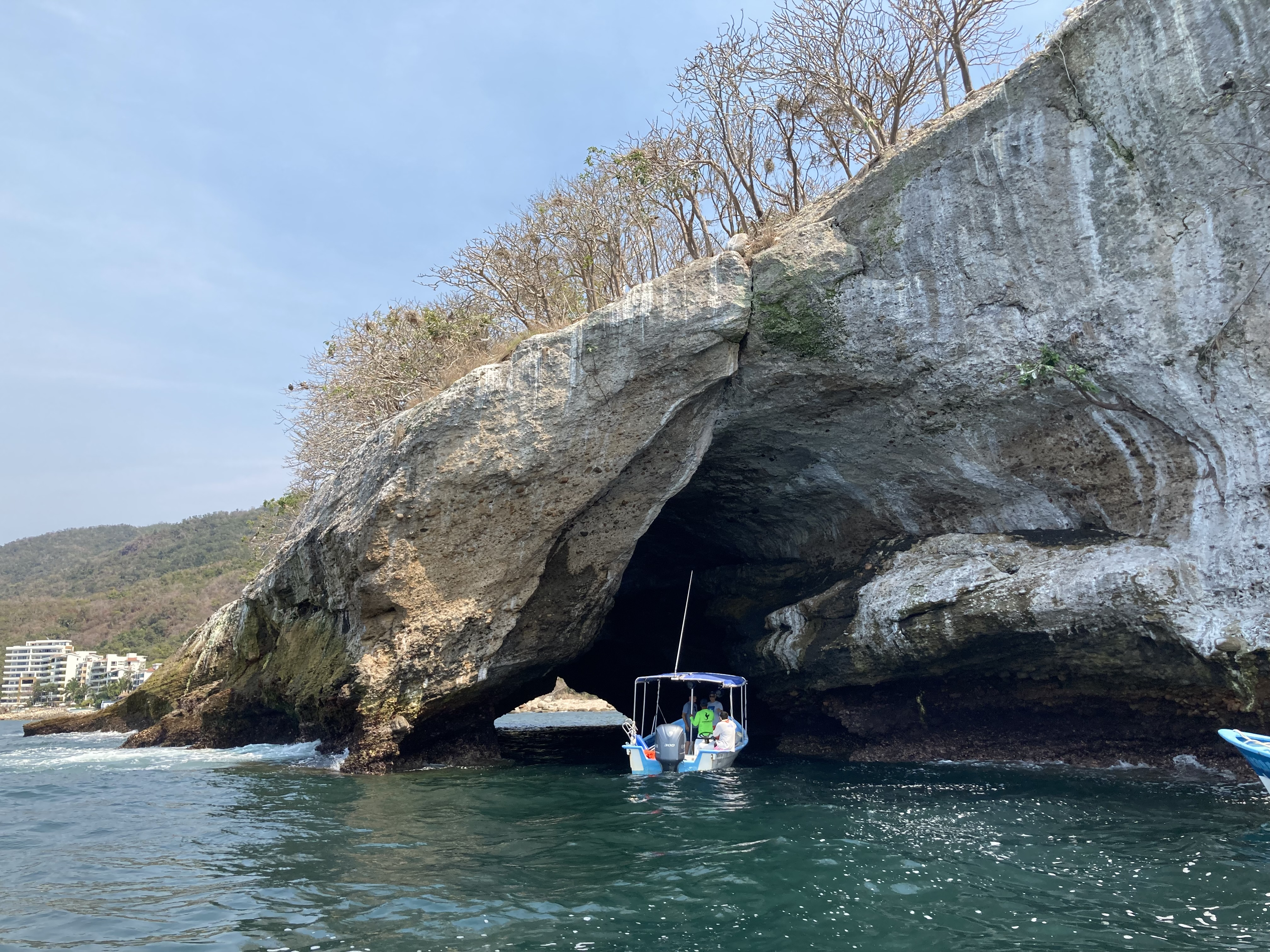
Roca de Los Arcos, the Rock of the Arches, with a boat entering the arch

The islands are composed of granite. There are five islets, 12 kilometres (7.5 mi) south of Puerto Vallarta. The three largest arches are named Roca de Los Arcos (The Rock of the Arches), Roca de la Tortuga (Turtle Rock), and Roca del Diablo (Devil's Rock). Devil's Rock is named so due to one of its cliffs' shadows looking similar to Satan. The waters around the park may be the deepest in the Bay of Banderas, going as deep as 480 metres (1,570 ft).

They are not very far from the city, being able to be seen from the downtown district.

== Wildlife ==
The park is an important breeding ground for birds such as osprey, blue-footed boobies, parakeets, cormorants, and pelicans.

Marine life that can be found in the waters below include the king angelfish, Pacific sergeant major, Cortez sea chub, giant damselfish, Moorish idol, Cortez rainbow wrasse, giant oceanic manta ray, Mexican goatfish, blacknosed butterflyfish, yellowtail surgeonfish, zebra moray, garden eels, eagle rays, octopuses, lobsters, seahorses, pufferfish, parrotfish, trumpetfish, cornetfish, clownfish, nudibranchs, anemones, and (rarely) sea turtles. From November to March, humpback whales, orcas, and dolphins are more common.

Bioluminescent plankton can be found in the area at night and are a major attraction.

== Activities ==
Tourists and locals from Puerto Vallarta commonly visit to swim, dive, snorkel, kayak, and paddleboard. The larger arches are so big that a motorboat can be driven through them.

A rocky 250 metres (820 ft) wall on the western side of the islets allows divers to head deeper into the bay, with two dive sites.
