= 17th Directors Guild of America Awards =

- Date: 1965
- Country: United States
- Presented by: Directors Guild of America

Highlights
- Best Director Feature Film: My Fair Lady – George Cukor
- Best Director Television: Profiles in Courage for "Oscar W. Underwood" – Lamont Johnson
- Website: https://www.dga.org/Awards/History/1960s/1964.aspx?value=1964

The 17th Directors Guild of America Awards, honoring the outstanding directorial achievements in film and television in 1964, were presented in 1965.

== Winners and nominees ==
=== Film ===
Feature Film

George Cukor – My Fair Lady

- Peter Glenville – Becket
- John Huston – The Night of the Iguana
- Stanley Kubrick – Dr. Strangelove or: How I Learned to Stop Worrying and Love the Bomb
- Robert Stevenson – Mary Poppins

=== Television ===
Television

Lamont Johnson – Profiles in Courage for "Oscar W. Underwood"

- Paul Bogart – The Defenders for "The Seven Hundred Year Old Gang"
- Jerry Paris – The Dick Van Dyke Show for "The Life and Love of Joe Coogan"
- Stuart Rosenberg – The Defenders for "Blacklist"
- George Schaefer – Hallmark Hall of Fame for "Abe Lincoln in Illinois"

=== Honorary Life Member ===
- Jack L. Warner
