= Barra de Navidad =

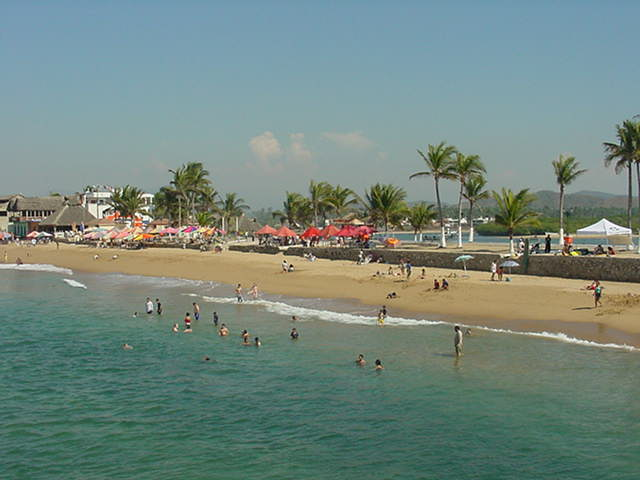
- Barra de Navidad beach from Jetty

- Location within Jalisco Location within Mexico
- Coordinates: 19.203°N 104.683°W
- Country: Mexico
- State: Jalisco
- Municipality: Cihuatlán

Population (2020)
  - Total: 4,266
- Area code: 315

Barra de Navidad is a small town located on the western coastline of the Mexican state of Jalisco. It belongs to the municipality of Cihuatlán. The town population was 4,266 according to the 2020 census.

Barra de Navidad ("Christmas Sandbar") is a small farming and fishing community located on the east end of the Bahía de Navidad, 60 km north of Manzanillo, Colima. In recent years, the Jalisco state government has promoted Barra as a tourist attraction of the Costalegre. The beachfront fronting the sandbar arks toward San Patricio, Jalisco, 4.5 kilometers to the west.

The history of "modern" Barra de Navidad dates back to the mid-16th century when the Spanish used it for ship building, repairs and a jumping off point to the Philippines. A monument has been erected as a memory to these journeys at the end of the jetty. Ruy López de Villalobos (1500–1544) fleet of six galleon ships, the Santiago, Jorge, San Antonio, San Cristóbal, San Martín, and San Juan, left Barra de Navidad with 370 to 400 men on November 1, 1542. On the early morning of November 21, 1564, armed with five ships and 500 soldiers, Miguel López de Legazpi, Lope Martín and sail-captain Andrés de Urdaneta also sailed from the port of Barra de Navidad.

The large lagoon behind Barra de Navidad is criss-crossed by small fishing boats gathering scallops and transporting visitors and locals from Barra to Isla Navidad and the Grand Bay Hotel, recently voted the Number One hotel/resort in Mexico by the Travel Channel. These boats (panga taxies) also carry passengers to and from the small Colima community of Colimilla where restaurants line the shore.
