= Mismaloya =

Human settlement in Mexico

Coordinates: 20.531018°N 105.292625°W

Mismaloya (from Nahuatl: michmaloyan "place where they grab fish with their hands") is a small village, located on the coast of the Bahía de Banderas in the Mexican state of Jalisco. Mismaloya lies on Highway 200, south of Puerto Vallarta.

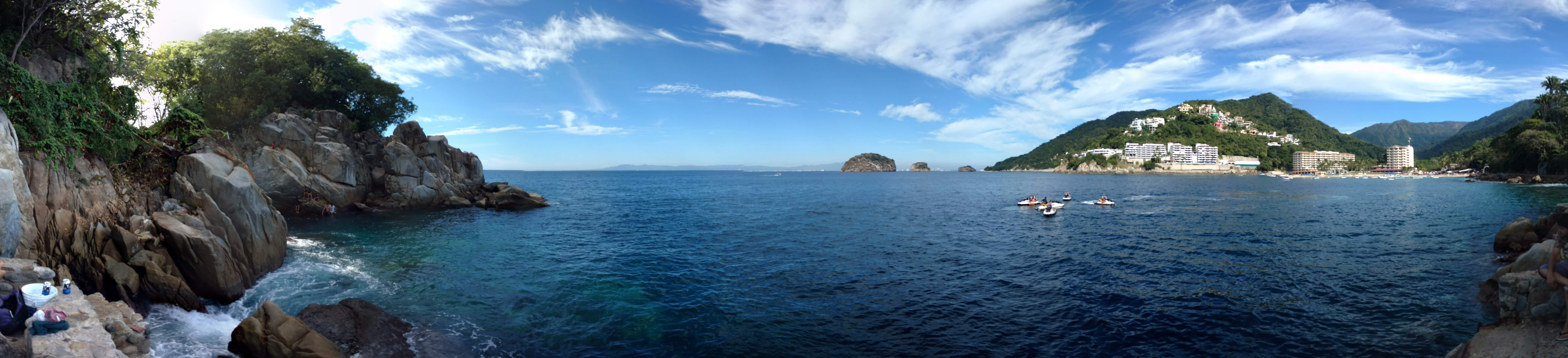
Mismaloya and Los Arcos, Jalisco, Mexico

== Climate ==
Mismaloya

Climate chart (precipitation, max. and min. temperature)
J	F	M	A	M	J	J	A	S	O	N	D
23 29 14	10 29 14	7 30 14	5 32 16	9 33 18	183 33 21	336 33 21	350 33 21	358 32 21	131 32 20	22 31 18	25 29 15
- █ Average max. and min. temperatures in °C
- █ Precipitation totals in mm
Imperial conversion
J	F	M	A	M	J	J	A	S	O	N	D
0.9 84 57	0.4 84 57	0.3 86 57	0.2 90 61	0.4 91 64	7.2 91 70	13 91 70	14 91 70	14 90 70	5.2 90 68	0.9 88 64	1 84 59
- █ Average max. and min. temperatures in °F
- █ Precipitation totals in inches

Mismaloya has a tropical wet and dry climate (Köppen Aw) featuring stable, warm temperatures all year round, with two distinct seasons, a dry season from November through May, and a wet season from June through October. UV radiation levels are high all year round, ranging from 7 January and December to 11+ between April and September. Heat and Humidity is high from December to April and it can reach extreme levels between July and August.

Climate data for Mismaloya, Jalisco
Month	Jan	Feb	Mar	Apr	May	Jun	Jul	Aug	Sep	Oct	Nov	Dec	Year
Record high °C (°F)	35 (95)	35 (95)	34 (93)	36 (97)	34 (93)	39 (102)	38 (100)	35 (95)	37 (99)	38 (100)	37 (99)	36 (97)	39 (102)
Mean daily maximum °C (°F)	29 (84)	29 (84)	30 (86)	32 (90)	33 (91)	33 (91)	33 (91)	33 (91)	32 (90)	32 (90)	31 (88)	29 (84)	31.3 (88.3)
Daily mean °C (°F)	21.5 (70.7)	21.5 (70.7)	21.5 (70.7)	24 (75)	25.5 (77.9)	27 (81)	27 (81)	27 (81)	26.5 (79.7)	26 (79)	24.5 (76.1)	22 (72)	24.5 (76.1)
Mean daily minimum °C (°F)	14 (57)	14 (57)	14 (57)	16 (61)	18 (64)	21 (70)	21 (70)	21 (70)	21 (70)	20 (68)	18 (64)	15 (59)	17.5 (63.5)
Record low °C (°F)	9 (48)	9 (48)	9 (48)	9 (48)	10 (50)	16 (61)	17 (63)	21 (70)	11 (52)	17 (63)	14 (57)	9 (48)	9 (48)
Average precipitation mm (inches)	23 (0.9)	10 (0.4)	7 (0.3)	5 (0.2)	9 (0.4)	183 (7.2)	336 (13.2)	350 (13.8)	358 (14.1)	131 (5.2)	22 (0.9)	25 (1.0)	1,459 (57.4)
Average precipitation days (≥ 0.1 mm)	1	1	0	0	0	7	15	15	15	6	1	1	61
Mean monthly sunshine hours	217	224	248	240	248	210	186	186	180	217	210	186	2,552
Mean daily sunshine hours	7	8	8	8	8	7	6	6	6	7	7	6	7
Source: Weather2Travel

Mismaloya mean sea temperature
Jan	Feb	Mar	Apr	May	Jun	Jul	Aug	Sep	Oct	Nov	Dec
24 °C (75 °F)	24 °C (75 °F)	23 °C (73 °F)	24 °C (75 °F)	25 °C (77 °F)	28 °C (82 °F)	29 °C (84 °F)	30 °C (86 °F)	29 °C (84 °F)	29 °C (84 °F)	27 °C (81 °F)	25 °C (77 °F)

The temperature of the sea is quite stable, with lows of 23 °C (73 °F) in March, and a high of 30 °C (86 °F) in August.

== Film location ==
Mismaloya is most famous as the site where the 1963 film The Night of the Iguana was filmed. The set and crew quarters rise up the hill on the south side of the Mismaloya cove. The set is only ruins now, and the once-famous John Huston Cafe is an empty shell on top of the hill. Huston once wrote that he was the only person who cared for the place. The movie made Puerto Vallarta famous, but the set has been forgotten. On the other side of Highway 200 from Playa Mismaloya is El Eden, a jungle setting where parts of the movie Predator were filmed.

== Tourism ==
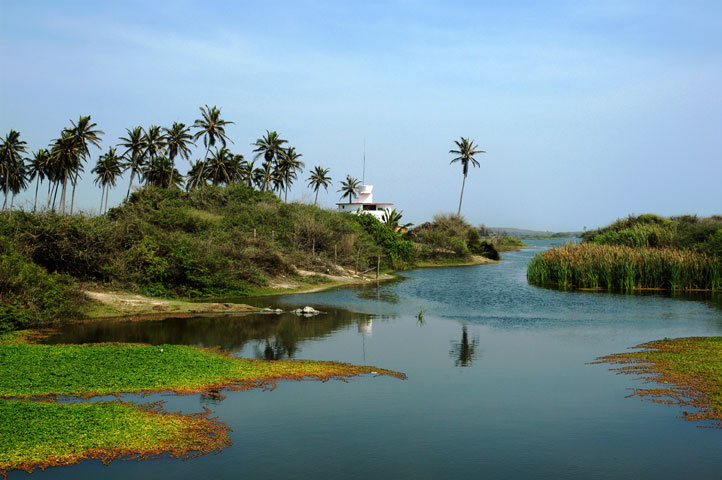
Misaloya Beach Estuary Turtle Sanctuary.

The beach at Playa Mismaloya is located in a cove, with a view of Los Arcos sea rocks. There are boats which tourists can rent, and the beach is home to several restaurants and trinket peddlers, as well as the Hotel Barceló, a zoo and La Jolla De Mismaloya Condominiums. In the surrounding area, the Vallarta Botanical Gardens can be reached by 15 minutes bus ride.
