= San Patricio, Jalisco =

Locality in Jalisco, Mexico

San Patricio Melaque
- Locality
- West end of the Melaque beach

- Location within Jalisco Location within Mexico
- Coordinates: 19°13′31″N 104°42′04″W
- Country: Mexico
- State: Jalisco
- Municipality: Cihuatlán

Area
  - Total: 2.15 km^{2} (0.83 sq mi)
- Elevation: 12 m (39 ft)

Population (2020)
  - Total: 6,958
  - Density: 3,240/km^{2} (8,380/sq mi)
- Time zone: UTC-6 (ZC)
- Postal code: 48980
- Telephone code: 315

San Patricio, also known as Melaque, is an urban locality in Cihuatlán, Jalisco, Mexico. As of the year 2020, it has a total population of 6,958.

== Geography ==
San Patricio is located on the southern coast of Jalisco, about 4 kilometers northwest of Barra de Navidad. It is bounded by Laguna del Tule to the east. Its average elevation is 12 meters above the sea level.

== Climate ==
San Patricio has a Tropical savanna climate (Aw). It sees the least rainfall in April, with an average precipitation of 0.5 mm; and the most in September, with an average precipitation of 190.2 mm.

Climate data for San Patricio
| Month | Jan | Feb | Mar | Apr | May | Jun | Jul | Aug | Sep | Oct | Nov | Dec | Year |
|---|---|---|---|---|---|---|---|---|---|---|---|---|---|
| Mean daily maximum °C (°F) | 28 (82) | 28 (82) | 27 (81) | 27 (81) | 29 (84) | 30 (86) | 31 (88) | 31 (88) | 31 (88) | 31 (88) | 30 (86) | 29 (84) | 29 (85) |
| Daily mean °C (°F) | 24 (75) | 23 (73) | 23 (73) | 24 (75) | 25 (77) | 27 (81) | 28 (82) | 28 (82) | 28 (82) | 28 (82) | 26 (79) | 25 (77) | 26 (78) |
| Mean daily minimum °C (°F) | 20 (68) | 19 (66) | 19 (66) | 20 (68) | 22 (72) | 24 (75) | 25 (77) | 25 (77) | 25 (77) | 24 (75) | 22 (72) | 21 (70) | 22 (72) |
| Average rainfall mm (inches) | 24.3 (0.96) | 13.1 (0.52) | 5.4 (0.21) | 0.5 (0.02) | 7.9 (0.31) | 86.0 (3.39) | 145.8 (5.74) | 168.2 (6.62) | 190.2 (7.49) | 82.9 (3.26) | 25.3 (1.00) | 9.8 (0.39) | 759.4 (29.91) |
| Average rainy days (≥ 1 mm) | 1.8 | 0.9 | 0.4 | 0.1 | 1.5 | 11.6 | 18.8 | 19.4 | 17.5 | 8.3 | 2.0 | 1.2 | 83.5 |
| Mean daily daylight hours | 11.1 | 11.5 | 12.1 | 12.6 | 13.1 | 13.3 | 13.1 | 12.7 | 12.2 | 11.7 | 11.2 | 11.0 | 12.1 |
Source: Weatherspark.com
