= Quimixto =

Quimixto Quimixto
- town
- Interactive map of Quimixto

Government
  - Federal electoral district: Jalisco's 5th
- Highest elevation: 680 m (2,220 ft)

Population
  - Total: 370
- Time zone: UTC-6 (Zona Centro)

Quimixto is a town in the municipality of Cabo Corrientes in the state of Jalisco, in the western part of the country, 700 km west of Mexico City. 370 people live there. Along with its sister town, Yelapa, it is only reachable by water taxi from Puerto Vallarta or Boca de Tomatlan.
