= Cihuatlán =

- Municipality and town
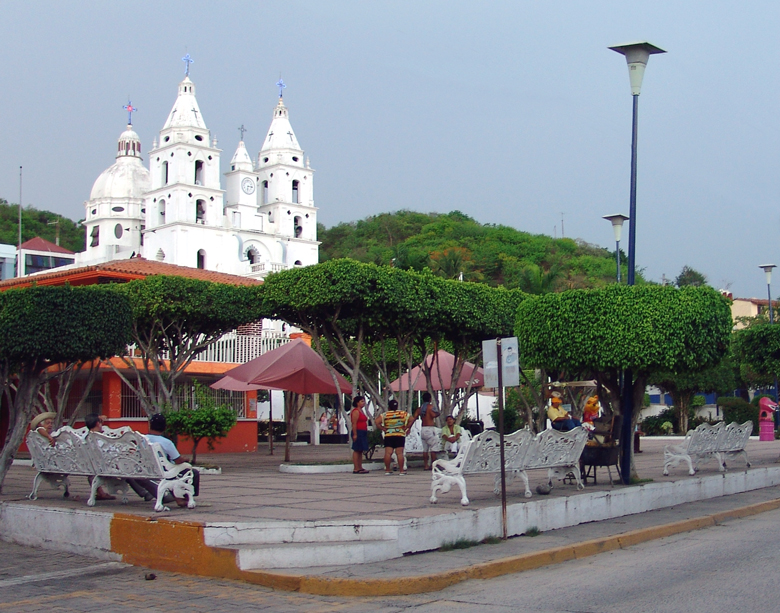
- Town square in Cihuatlán, showing church building and plaza

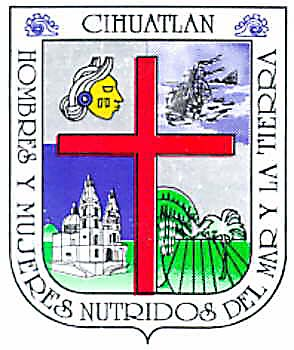
- Coat of arms

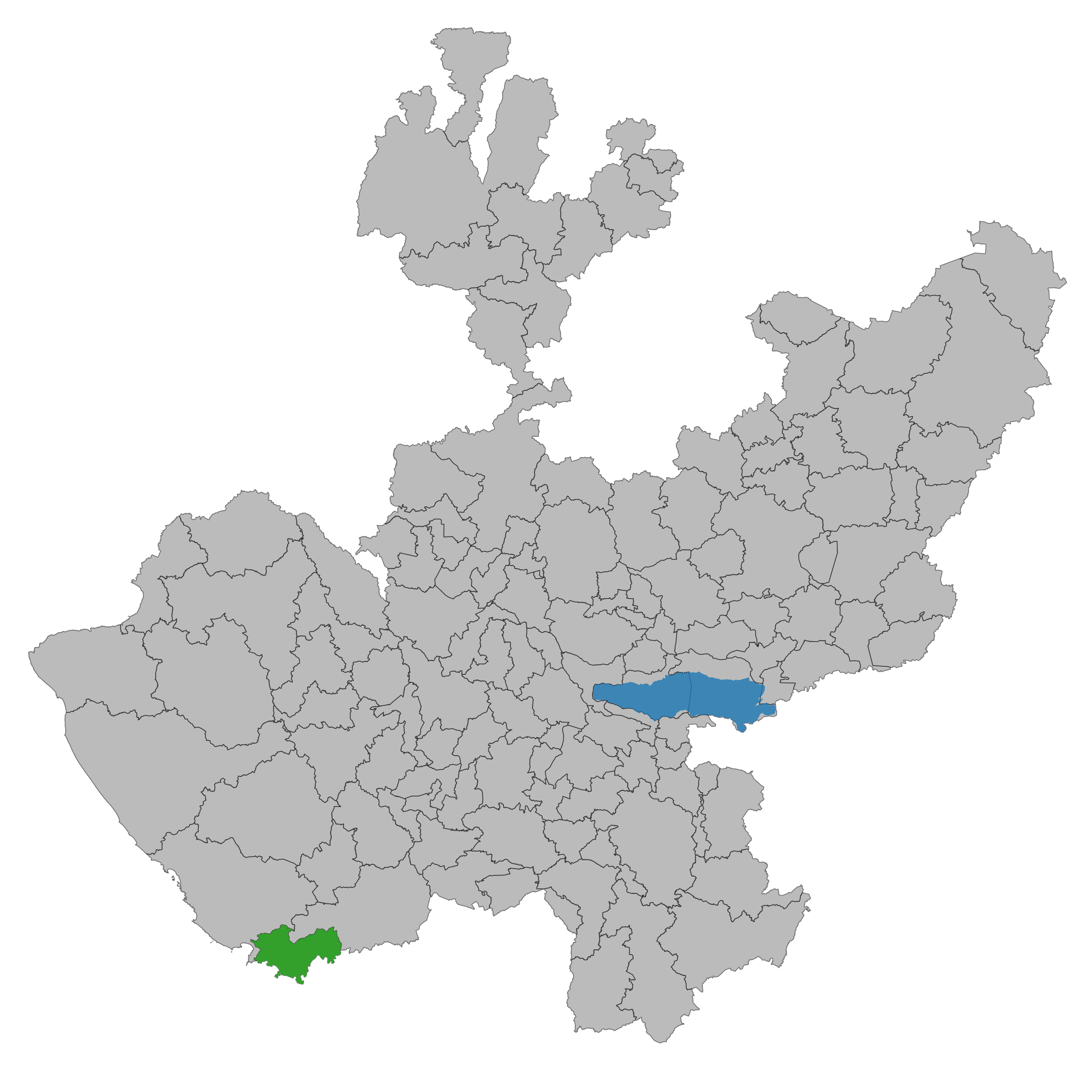
- Municipality location in Jalisco

- Location in Mexico Cihuatlán (Mexico)
- Coordinates: 19°15′N 104°34′W
- Country: Mexico
- State: Jalisco

Area
  - Total: 501.3 km^{2} (193.6 sq mi)
  - Town: 4.56 km^{2} (1.76 sq mi)

Population (2020 census)
  - Total: 40,139
  - Density: 80.07/km^{2} (207.4/sq mi)
  - Town: 18,787
  - Town density: 4,120/km^{2} (10,700/sq mi)
- Time zone: UTC-6 (Central (US Central))

Cihuatlán is a coastal municipality in the Mexican state of Jalisco. Its main city is also named Cihuatlán.

== Etymology ==
The word Cihuatlán is compounded of two words of Nahuatl origin, a language spoken in central Mexico since the seventh century AD and the language of the Aztecs: Zihua, woman, and Tlán place; therefore in Cihuatlán means place of women.

== History ==
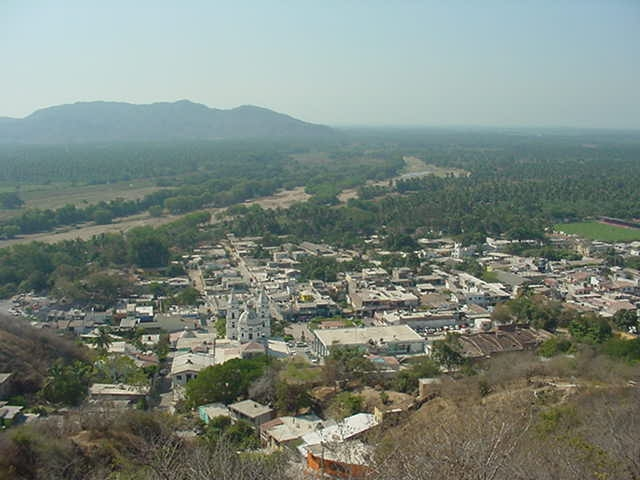
Cihuatlán and the Marabasco river delta

The town was founded on the Marabasco River, and at the time of the Spanish conquest its population was about 500 women and only 20 men. The first Spanish expedition to the Jalisco coastal zone was led by Gonzalo de Sandoval.

By decree of the President of the Republic of Mexico, on December 16, 1825, the harbour Barra de Navidad was rebuilt in order to accommodate local and foreign trade.

== Climate ==
Climate data for Cihuatlán (1991–2020 normals, extremes 1946–present)
Month	Jan	Feb	Mar	Apr	May	Jun	Jul	Aug	Sep	Oct	Nov	Dec	Year
Record high °C (°F)	39 (102)	37.5 (99.5)	39.5 (103.1)	39 (102)	39.5 (103.1)	39 (102)	40 (104)	40.5 (104.9)	39 (102)	39 (102)	39.5 (103.1)	40 (104)	40.5 (104.9)
Mean daily maximum °C (°F)	33.0 (91.4)	33.1 (91.6)	33.1 (91.6)	33.5 (92.3)	34.5 (94.1)	35.0 (95.0)	35.1 (95.2)	35.1 (95.2)	34.5 (94.1)	34.9 (94.8)	34.6 (94.3)	33.7 (92.7)	34.2 (93.6)
Daily mean °C (°F)	25.5 (77.9)	25.4 (77.7)	25.3 (77.5)	25.7 (78.3)	27.4 (81.3)	29.0 (84.2)	29.2 (84.6)	29.1 (84.4)	28.7 (83.7)	28.8 (83.8)	27.9 (82.2)	26.4 (79.5)	27.4 (81.3)
Mean daily minimum °C (°F)	18.1 (64.6)	17.8 (64.0)	17.5 (63.5)	17.9 (64.2)	20.2 (68.4)	23.1 (73.6)	23.3 (73.9)	23.1 (73.6)	22.9 (73.2)	22.7 (72.9)	21.1 (70.0)	19.1 (66.4)	20.6 (69.1)
Record low °C (°F)	1.5 (34.7)	3.5 (38.3)	6 (43)	1 (34)	1.5 (34.7)	2.5 (36.5)	0.01 (32.02)	2 (36)	2.5 (36.5)	3.5 (38.3)	3.5 (38.3)	4.37 (39.87)	0.01 (32.02)
Average precipitation mm (inches)	12.1 (0.48)	13.8 (0.54)	12.4 (0.49)	0.2 (0.01)	6.3 (0.25)	139.5 (5.49)	152.3 (6.00)	255.7 (10.07)	289.5 (11.40)	143.8 (5.66)	45.7 (1.80)	13.1 (0.52)	1,084.4 (42.69)
Average precipitation days	2.0	1.9	0.9	0.9	2.5	9.5	13.0	16.3	16.2	7.3	2.5	2.5	75.5
Source: Servicio Meteorológico Nacional

== Coat of arms ==
The Cihuatlán coat of arms is in a French style with cross-sectioning. In the upper left section is the image of a pre-Hispanic woman's head. In the upper right section is a ship sailing on the sea. In the bottom left section is a religious building and in the bottom right section, a view of a fertile valley.

== Most important settlements ==
- Cihuatlán, 15,697 inhabitants (2005)
- Melaque, 6,379 inhabitants
- Barra de Navidad, 3,386 inhabitants
- Jaluco, 2,182 inhabitants
- Emiliano Zapata, 1,589 inhabitants

== Notable people ==
- Nestor Enrique Valencia Guerrero, June 9, 1965, grandson to former municipal president of Cihuatlán, Ramon Valencia Torres, Mayor and Councilmember of the City of Bell, California, USA. First Mayor in the United States that welcomed immigrant children from Honduras, Guatemala, and El Salvador, in 2014. Also, his civic actions for the City of Bell changed government transparency laws.

== Government ==
=== Municipal presidents ===
Municipal president	Term	Political party	Notes
Heliodoro Trujillo	1904-1911		
Juan Murguía	1912		
Hilarión Pardo	1913		
J. Guadalupe Cárdenas	1919		
Tomás Huerta	1920		
Elías Salas	1921		
Victoriano Bobadilla	1922		
Tomás Huerta	1923		
Marcelo García Araiza	1924		
J. Natividad Arreola	1926		
Domingo Rojas	1927		
Calixto Castrejón G.	1928		
Nazario Pineda	1929		
Jesús Morett S.	1930	PNR	
José Godoy Uribe	1931	PNR	
Everardo Hurtado	1932	PNR	
Jesús Morett	1933	PNR	
Tomás Huerta	1934	PNR	
Manuel González R.	1934	PNR	
Amador Araiza	1935	PNR	
Pedro García Araiza	1936	PNR	
J. Guadalupe Cázares	1937	PNR	
Pomposo Preciado	1938	PNR	Last one-year term
Ramón Valencia	1939-1940	PRM	First biennium
Luis Salaiza	1941-1942	PRM	
Amador Araiza	1943-1944	PRM	
Cosme Morán C.	1945-1946	PRM	
Abel Ochoa Huerta	1947-1948	PRI	
Cosme Morán C.	1949-1952	PRI	
Pedro Corona	1953-1954	PRI	
Juan Cárdenas R.	1955-1956	PRI	
Alfonso Orozco	1957-1958	PRI	Last biennium
Rogelio Salas G.	1959-1961	PRI	First triennium
Cosme Morán C.	1962-1964	PRI	
Telésforo Salas F.	1965-1967	PRI	
Mariano Velasco	1968-1970	PRI	
J. Jesús Morett M.	1971-1973	PRI	
Manuel Muñoz C.	1974-1976	PRI	
Vicente Morett M.	1977-1979	PRI	
Salvador Figueroa B.	1980-1982	PRI	
Alberto Macías Solís	1983	PRI	
Maximino Oregón Hernández	1984-1985	PRI	
José Antonio Morán Araiza	1986-1988	PRI	
Vicente Barrientos Díaz	1989-1992	PRI	
Arturo Salas Hernández	1992-1995	PRI	
José Antonio Morán Araiza	1995-1997	PRI	
Armando Zúñiga Cárdenas	01-01-1998–31-12-2000	PRI	
Jesús Enrique Morett Mendoza	01-01-2001–31-12-2003	PRI	
Martín Ortiz Quintero	01-01-2004–31-12-2006	PAN	
Enrique González Gómez	01-01-2007–31-12-2009	PRI	
Roberto Gallardo Ruiz	01-01-2010–30-09-2012	PAN	
Jesús Huerta Aguilar	01-10-2012–30-09-2015	PAN	
Fernando Martínez Guerrero	01-10-2015–31-03-2018	MC	He applied for a temporary leave, to run for reelection, which he got, after moving to PRD political party
Carlos Alfonso Rodarte Vázquez	01-04-2018–19-07-2018	MC	Acting municipal president
Fernando Martínez Guerrero	20-07-2018–30-09-2018	PRD	Resumed
Fernando Martínez Guerrero	01-10-2018–30-09-2021	PRD	He was reelected on 1 July 2018
Jorge Eliseo Salas Chávez	01-10-2021–	MC	

== See also ==
- Rudo y Cursi
