= Las Caletas =

Beach in Jalisco, Mexico

- Beach
- Location within Mexico
- Coordinates: 20°30′17″N 105°22′55″W
- Location: Mexico

Las Caletas is a beach near Puerto Vallarta, Jalisco, Mexico. The home of Hollywood director John Huston was once located there. Caletas is now leased and operated by Vallarta Adventures, a tour provider.
