= Vallarta Botanical Garden =

Botanical garden in Jalisco, Mexico

Jardín Botánico de Vallarta
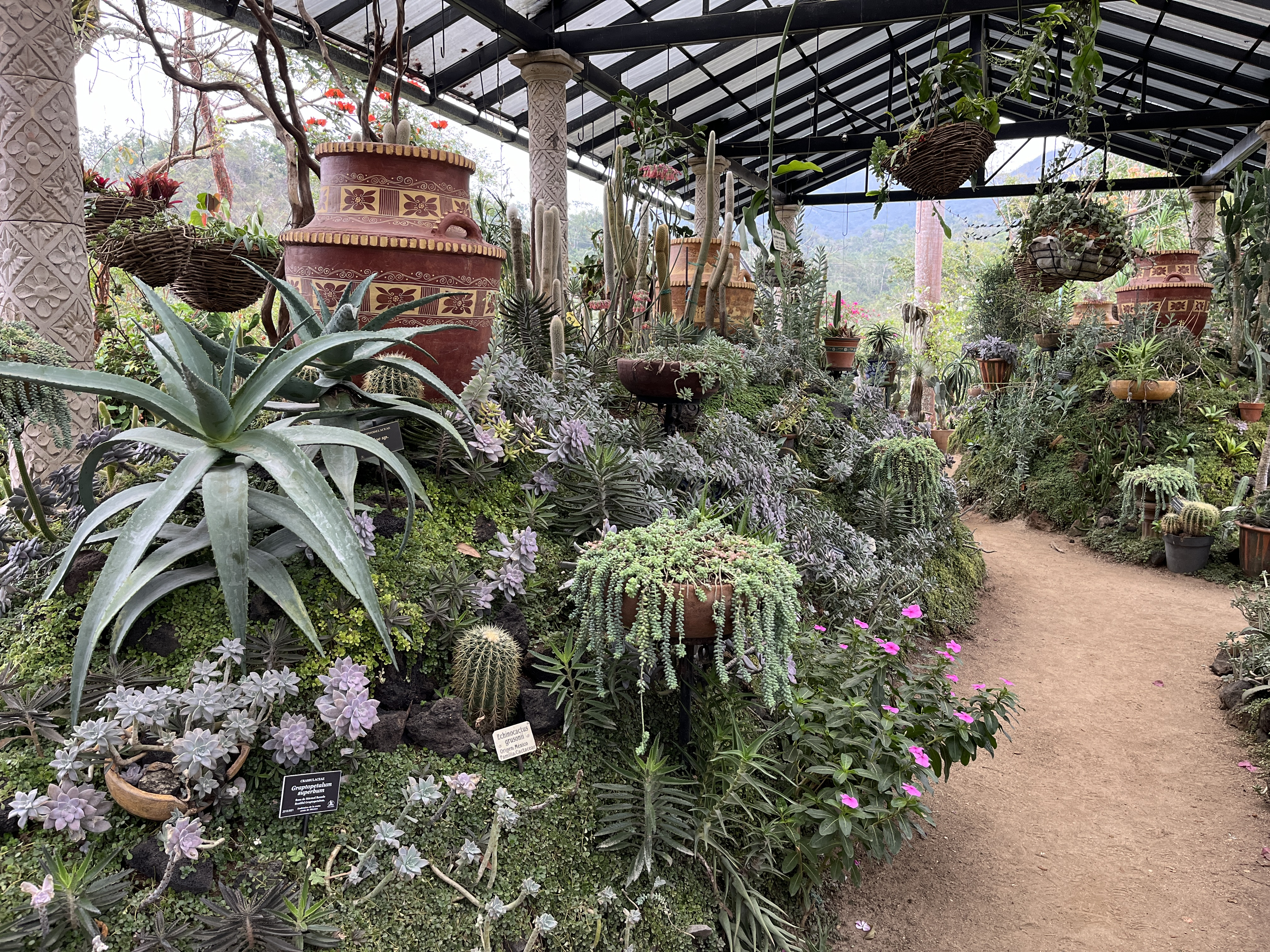
- Interactive map of Jardín Botánico de Vallarta
- Type: Botanical
- Location: km 24 Highway 200, Puerto Vallarta, Jalisco
- Nearest city: Puerto Vallarta, Jalisco Mexico
- Coordinates: 20°27′53.7″N 105°17′29.4″W
- Area: 79 acres (32 ha)
- Opened: 2005
- Founder: Bob Price
- Visitors: 35,000 (2022 Projected)
- Status: Open year-round, closed Mondays April 1 - Oct 31, and Christmas and New Year's Days
- Awards: 2022 APGA's Garden of Excellence Award; See Awards section for a complete list
- Collections: magnolias, rhododendrons, orchids, oaks, bromeliads, agaves, cactus, and wild palms.
- Website: www.vbgardens.org

The Vallarta Botanical Garden is a 79-acre (32 ha) botanical garden at 1,300 ft (400 m) above sea level, near Puerto Vallarta Mexico, of which 73 acres (30 ha) are dedicated to a reserve.

The garden was founded in 2004 and has been open to the public since 2005. The collections showcase plants of the Tropical Dry Forest Biome, native to the region around Puerto Vallarta and in which the gardens are located, as well as exotics from around the world. Orchid conservation and propagation is a focus of the garden's mission. These can be found on trees throughout the grounds and in the Holstein Orchid and Vanilla House. Other notable collections include oaks, bromeliads, agaves, cactus, rhododendrons and wild palms. The Vallarta Botanical Gardens actively participates in public environmental education through tours and classes.

The gardens feature hiking trails both through the native forest and the manicured garden grounds. Visitors are also welcome to swim in the Rio Horcones, the tropical river that runs through the property. Bird watchers will find the most birding activity early in the morning or later in the day.

The Vallarta Botanical Garden receives no government funding and there is a small admission charge. Vallarta Botanical Garden is a membership organization.

== Conservation ==
The Vallarta Botanical Garden is a leading environmental and conservation organization in Puerto Vallarta, Mexico. The garden's display, study and propagation of Mexican native plants and its track record in conservation has been a tourism generator for Mexico and has also inspired a love for nature in children.

Since its founding in 2004, the Vallarta Botanical Garden has focused on preserving the unique and unspoiled tropical forest that surrounds it. One of the most biodiverse areas in the world and home to several endangered species, this area is also one of the most carbon-dense ecosystems on the planet. Its protection is of international importance, and its deforestation could have dramatic effects on climate.

Efforts are underway to protect the unique tropical ecosystem which surrounds the garden by the establishment of a Forest Preserve with Protected status. In addition, resources are necessary to establish the first known Ocelot Sanctuary on newly acquired land. This will highlight the presence of the endangered small cat and the importance of the Jaguar Corridor in their survival.

== Affiliations ==
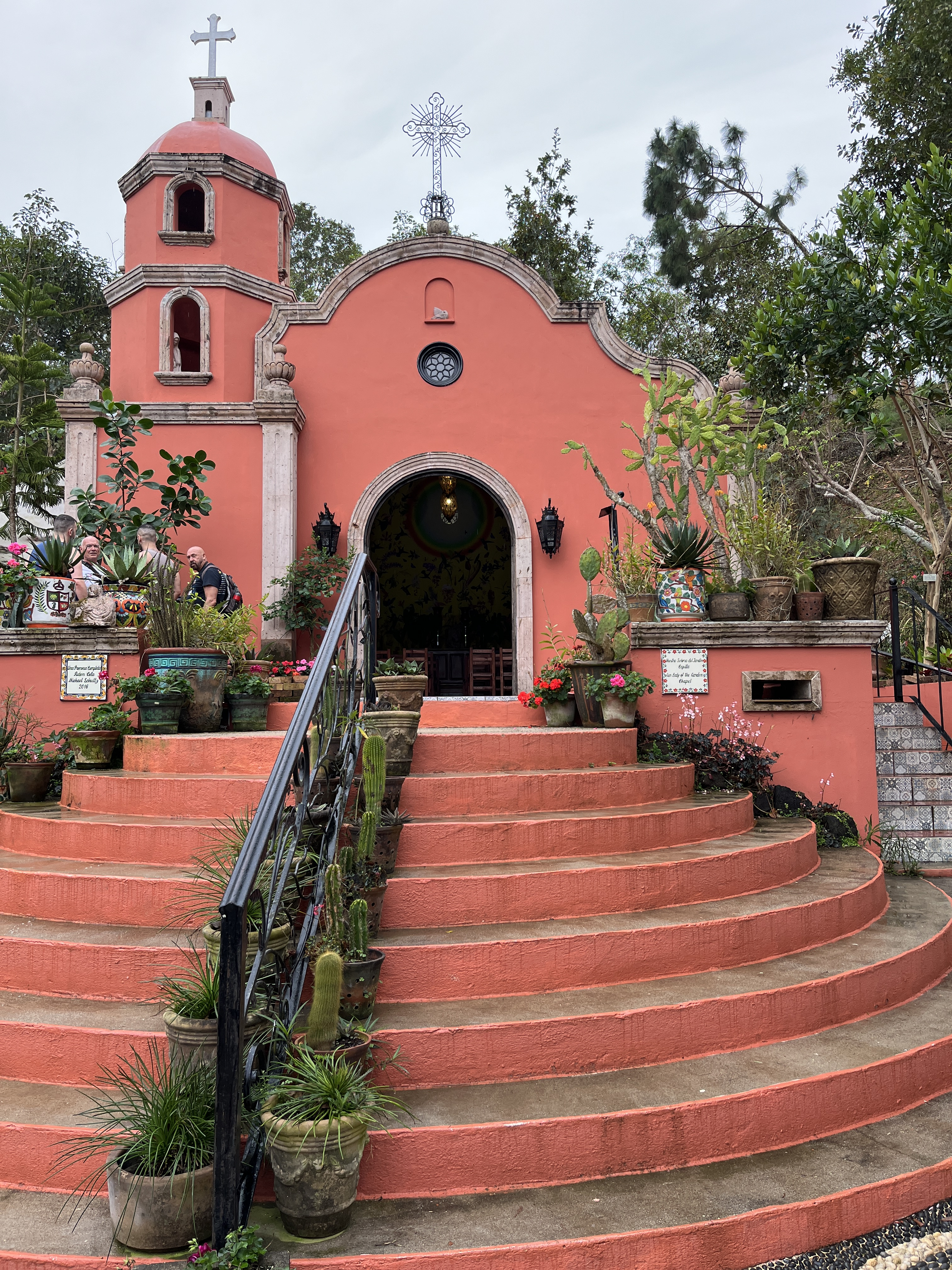
Our Lady of the Garden Chapel, 2024

- Asociación Mexicana de Orquideología Official Asociación Mexicana de Orquideología website
- Asociación Mexicana de Jardines Botánicos - Facebook page of Asociación Mexicana de Jardines Botánicos website
- American Public Garden Association (APGA) Official American Public Garden Association website
- Botanical Garden Conservation International (BGCI) Official Botanical Garden Conservation International website
- Friends of Vallarta Botanical Gardens, A.C. Official Friends of Vallarta Botanical Gardens, A.C. website
- Canadian Garden Tourism Council Official Canadian Garden Tourism Council website
- Canadian Garden Counsel Official Canadian Garden Counsel website

Sister Garden relationships: San Francisco Botanical Garden and with Santa Barbara Botanical Garden

== International Peace Garden ==
On February 16, 2017, the Cheryl L. Wheeler International Peace Garden of Mexico at the Vallarta Botanical Gardens was dedicated. The garden within the gardens is meant to be a place of contemplation and of peacefulness. Besides consisting of many native flowers and plants, it offers a section of monuments to our lost loved ones, as well as the interfaith chapel, Our Lady of the Garden, the Peace Garden's jewel. The chapel was updated in 2021 with the permanent art installation "Los Angelitos" by David Allen Burns and Austin Young of Fallen Fruit.

== Awards and recognition ==
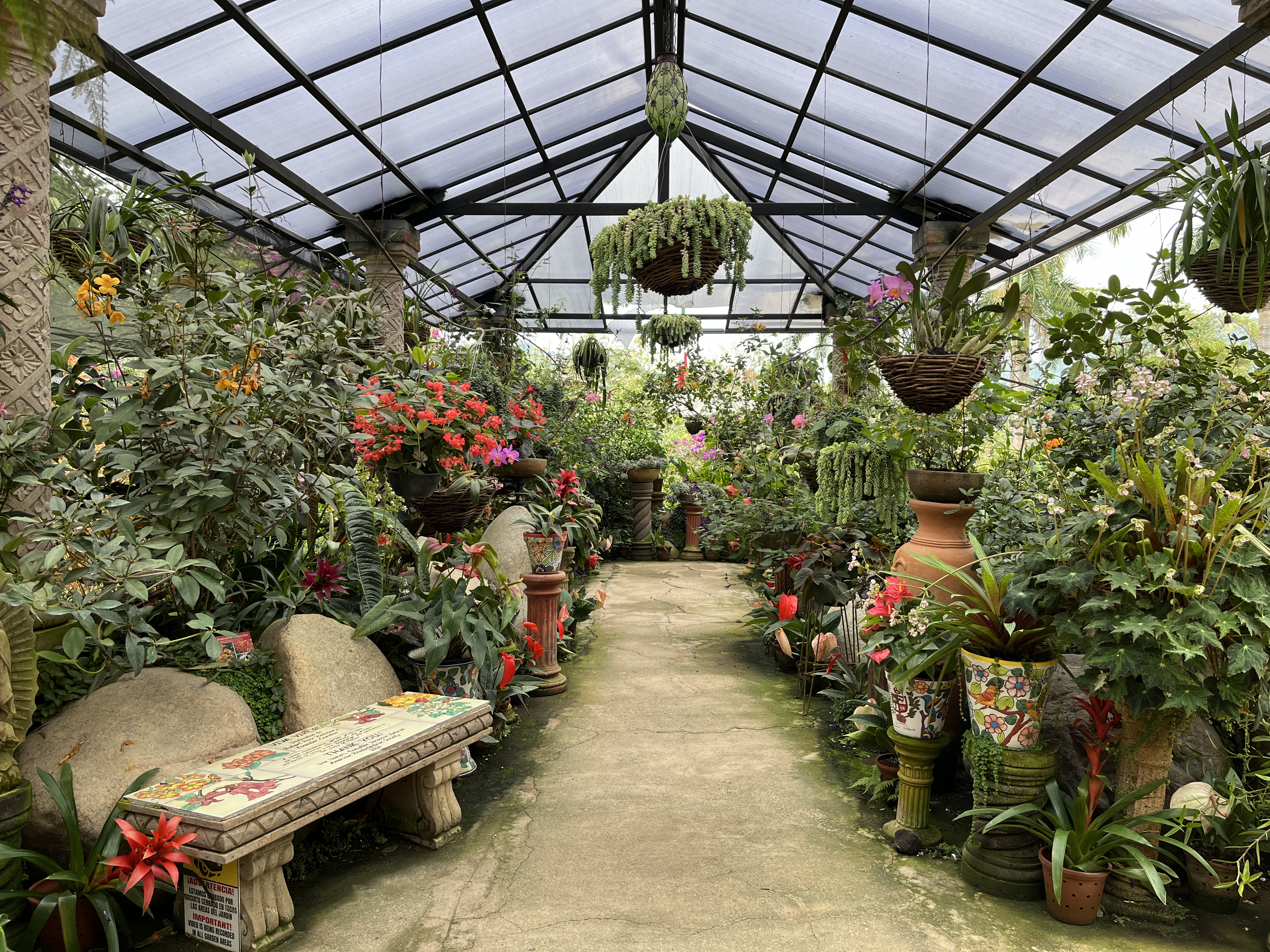
Part of the garden in 2024

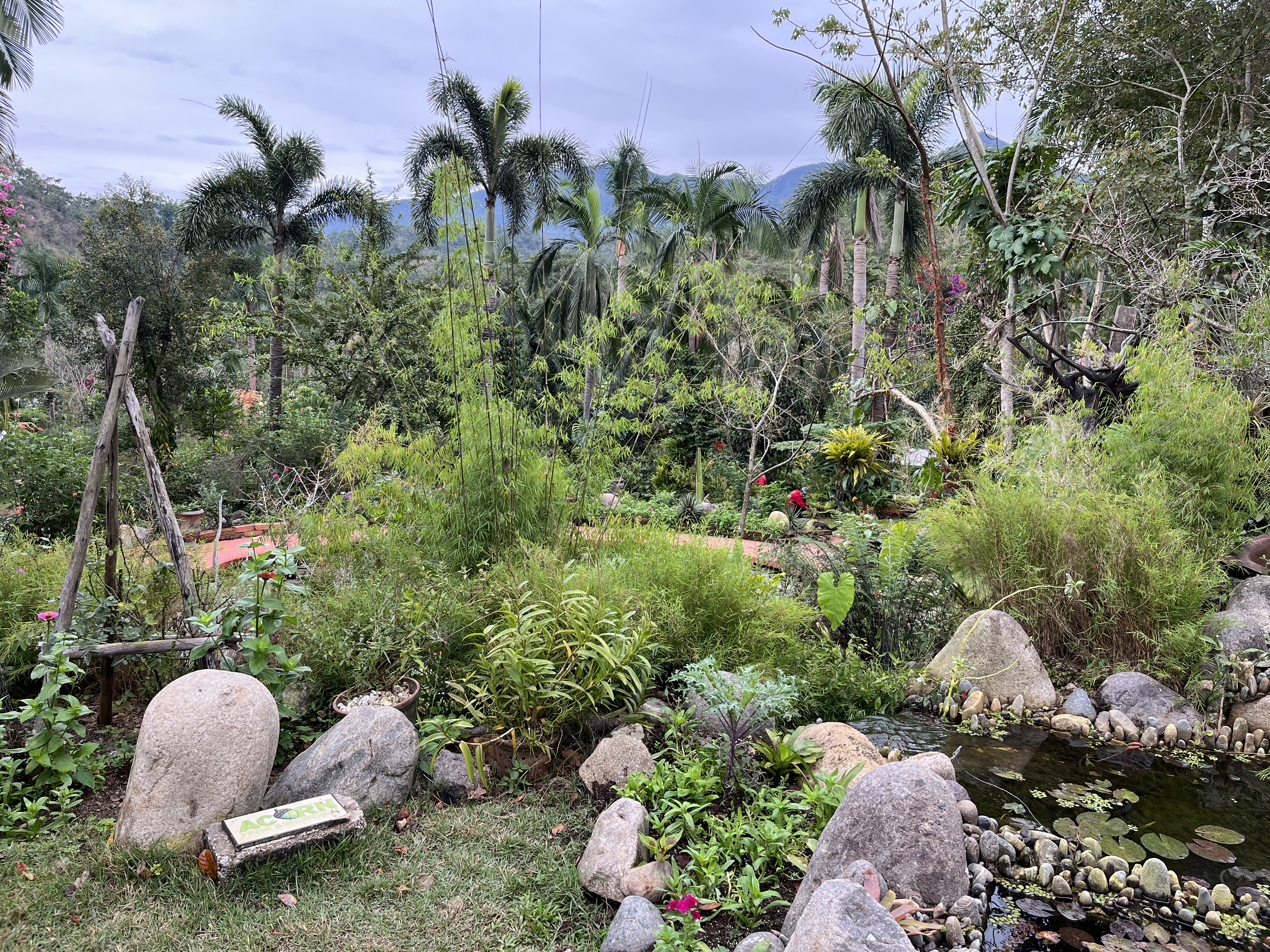
Garden, 2024

2013: "Top 10 North American Gardens Worth Travelling For" by the North American Garden Tourism Conference's International Tourism Award Jury

2015: "Top 10 North American Gardens Worth Travelling For" by the North American Garden Tourism Conference's International Tourism Award Jury USA Today ranked it as one of the 10 Best Botanical Gardens that "Think beyond the flower".

2017: The gardens was the recipient of the 2017 International Peace Garden, presented by the International Peace Garden Foundation .

2018: USA Today ranked it number four in its list of 10 "Best Botanical Gardens".

2019: "Top 10 North American Gardens Worth Travelling For" by the North American Garden Tourism Conference's International Tourism Award Jury, USA Today ranked it number six in its list of 10 "Best Botanical Gardens", "The Best Kept Secret" award by the readers of the Vallarta Tribune, "Best View Restaurant" award by the readers of the Vallarta Tribune.

2021: USA Today ranked it number four in its list of 10 "Best Botanical Gardens".

2022: American Public Garden Association's "Garden of Excellence" Award. The first botanical garden outside of the United States to win this award. USA Today ranked it number three in its list of 10 "Best Botanical Gardens".

== See also ==
- List of botanical gardens
