= Disturbing the peace (disambiguation) =

Disturbing the peace is a crime generally defined as the unsettling of proper order in a public space through one's actions.

Disturbing the peace may also refer to:

Books

- Disturbing the Peace (novel), a 1975 novel by Richard Yates
- Disturbing the Peace (Nancy Newman novel), a 2002 novel by Nancy Newman

Film and television

- "Disturbing the Peace" (Porridge), an episode of the BBC sitcom Porridge
- Disturbing the Peace (2009 film), a documentary film directed by the Chinese artist Ai Weiwei
- Disturbing the Peace (2016 film), a documentary about nonviolent peace activism by a group of former Israeli military and Palestinian fighters
- Disturbing the Peace (2020 film), an action thriller film

Music

- Disturbing the Peace (album), a 1985 album by Alcatrazz
- Disturbing tha Peace, a hip-hop group and record label
- Disturbing the Peace, an American rock band active from 1996 to 2002 that would later become Adair (band)
