= Young Hearts Crying =

- Author: Richard Yates
- Language: English
- Publisher: Delacorte Press
- Publication date: 1984
- Publication place: United States
- Preceded by: Liars in Love
- Followed by: Cold Spring Harbor

Young Hearts Crying is the penultimate novel of American writer Richard Yates.

The novel tells the story of struggling poet and artist Michael Davenport, who spurns his heiress wife's offer of financial assistance, choosing instead to make abortive attempts at achieving artistic success on his own terms. The novel, Yates' first in over six years, was generally well received, with Associated Press book reviewer Phil Thomas calling it "absorbing" and "superb" and New York Times reviewer Christopher Lehmann-Haupt terming the work "absorbing" and "beguilingly vivid" despite complaining that characters' lack of self-awareness became "ultimately tiresome."
