= Justin Haythe =

American novelist

- Born: September 16, 1973 (age 52); London, United Kingdom
- Education: The American School in London; Middlebury College; Sarah Lawrence College (MFA)
- Occupations: Screenwriter; Author; Television producer
- Known for: The Honeymoon; Revolutionary Road; The Serpent Queen

Justin Haythe (born September 16, 1973) is an American novelist, short story writer, and screenwriter. He is best known for his book The Honeymoon, and the screenplay for Revolutionary Road, directed by Sam Mendes.

Haythe lives in New York City.

== Early life and literary debut ==
Born in London, Haythe is a graduate of The American School in London and Middlebury College. He earned his MFA from Sarah Lawrence College. His first short story was published by Harper's Magazine. His debut novel, The Honeymoon, was longlisted for the 2004 Man Booker Prize. Haythe has plans to write another novel.

== Screenwriting career ==
Haythe wrote the screenplay of the 20th Century Fox thriller The Clearing. The film was released on July 2, 2004, directed by Pieter Jan Brugge, and starred Helen Mirren and Robert Redford. Afterwards, Haythe wrote the screenplay to Revolutionary Road, starring Leonardo DiCaprio, Kate Winslet and Kathy Bates, and based on the popular 1961 book of the same name by Richard Yates. The film was released on December 26, 2008 and was nominated for a USC Scripter Award as well as a BAFTA Award for Best Adapted Screenplay

After, Haythe was a co-writer and executive producer of Snitch, a 2013 action-thriller film starring Dwayne Johnson. The project was first set up in 2004 by Guy East and Nigel Sinclair, partners at Spitfire Pictures. They were inspired by a Frontline documentary about how changes to the federal drug policy of the United States encouraged the incarcerated to snitch on their accomplices. Haythe also helped rewrite The Lone Ranger, a 2013 Disney/Bruckheimer-produced re-imagining of the iconic radio character, starring Armie Hammer and Johnny Depp. The script was originally written by Pirates of the Caribbean and Shrek scribes Terry Rossio and Ted Elliot, and had more of a supernatural element with werewolves and "ghost coyotes", which was ultimately toned down in the finished film.

Haythe reunited with Lone Ranger director Gore Verbinski to write A Cure for Wellness, a 2016 science fiction psychological horror thriller film. He wrote a draft of the Queen musical biopic Bohemian Rhapsody. He wrote the Cold War spy thriller Red Sparrow, released in 2018, starring Jennifer Lawrence, and did rewrites on Morbius.

In 2022, Haythe created the period television drama The Serpent Queen, centering on the life and political schemes of Catherine de' Medici, for Starz. It got renewed for a second and final season on October 27, 2022.

== Filmography ==
Film

Year	Title	Writer	Executive producer
2004	The Clearing	Yes	No
2008	Revolutionary Road	Yes	No
2013	Snitch	Yes	Yes
2013	The Lone Ranger	Yes	No
2016	A Cure for Wellness	Yes	Yes
2018	Red Sparrow	Yes	No
2018	Bohemian Rhapsody	No	Yes
TBA	A Matter of Time	Yes	No

Additional literary material

- Haunted Mansion (2023)

Television

Year	Title	Director	Writer	Executive producer	Creator	Notes
2022–2024	The Serpent Queen	Yes	Yes	Yes	Yes	Directed 6 episodes
