= Disturbing the Peace (novel) =

1975 novel by Richard Yates

- Cover to the first edition
- Author: Richard Yates
- Language: English
- Genre: Novel
- Publisher: Delacorte Press/ S. Lawrence
- Publication date: 1975
- Publication place: United States
- Media type: Print (Hardback & Paperback)
- ISBN: 1-4990-9692-5

Disturbing the Peace is a novel by American writer Richard Yates. First published in 1975, Yates's fourth book concerns the psychological breakdown and subsequent institutionalization of an alcoholic salesman. Semi-autobiographical, the novel was dismissed by critics as his weakest book.

== Plot summary ==
A prototypical Yatesian dreamer, John C. Wilder is a bored but successful salesman of advertising space, living in New York City who seeks refuge from the disappointments of his life in alcohol and adultery. He breaks down during a distillers' convention. Lacking sleep and the worse for alcohol upon his return to New York, he threatens his family. His friend, Paul Borg, has him committed to the psychiatric ward of Bellevue Hospital in New York. Upon his release he seeks help from his family, psychiatrists, and AA meetings, all of whom he subsequently rejects. With the encouragement of a mistress, Pamela Hendricks, Wilder renews himself through their common love of movies and the prospect of making a film about his institutionalization. After a group of enthusiastic college students embrace his story and partially film his screenplay, Wilder leaves his family and job to move to Hollywood in the hopes of securing a deal that will complete and distribute the film. The loss of his mistress and the rejection he suffers from producers leads him even deeper into an abyss of paranoid alcoholic delusion. The novel ends with Wilder wandering the streets of Los Angeles, declaring himself to be Jesus Christ (mirroring a delusional incident in Yates's own life), and being recommitted to an institution.

== Critical reception ==
Critics largely dismissed the book as Yates's weakest and wrote that it confirmed him as a one-book-writer. Fourteen years after the success of Revolutionary Road, critics were expecting a novel as astonishing as his debut to confirm his status as a great writer. While Yates's short-story collection Eleven Kinds of Loneliness was celebrated, his second novel A Special Providence was panned. The lackluster sales and critical reception for Disturbing the Peace convinced many that "like Fitzgerald and so many others, he’d squandered his talent, drank it away." This reputation persisted until the following year when Yates published his acclaimed novel The Easter Parade.

For some period of time, Joe Pesci held the film rights but never acted on it.
