= Eleven Kinds of Loneliness =

1962 collection of short stories by Richard Yates

- First edition
- Author: Richard Yates
- Language: English
- Publisher: Little, Brown and Company
- Publication date: 1962
- Publication place: United States
- Preceded by: Revolutionary Road
- Followed by: A Special Providence

Eleven Kinds of Loneliness is a collection of short stories written by Richard Yates from 1951 to 1961. All of the stories also appeared in the posthumously released Richard Yates, The Collected Stories (2004), which includes other stories.

== Contents ==
- "Doctor Jack-o'-lantern"
- "The Best of Everything"
- "Jody Rolled The Bones"
- "No Pain Whatsoever"
- "A Glutton for Punishment"
- "A Wrestler with Sharks"
- "Fun with a Stranger"
- "The B.A.R. Man"
- "A Really Good Jazz Piano"
- "Out with the Old"
- "Builders"
