= Debra Schutt =

American set decorator and art director (born 1955)

- Born: 1955; Webster, New York
- Occupations: Art director and set decorator
- Years active: 1985–present

Debra Schutt (born 1955) is an American set decorator and art director. She was nominated at the 81st Academy Awards in the category of Best Art Direction for her work on the film Revolutionary Road. She shared her nomination with art director Kristi Zea. As well as winning the Primetime Emmy for Boardwalk Empire for her outstanding art direction as set director.

== Selected filmography ==
- Navy SEALs (1990)
- Fried Green Tomatoes (1991)
- A Bronx Tale (1993)
- Last Action Hero (1993)
- Picture Perfect (1997)
- The Horse Whisperer (1998)
- Sleepy Hollow (1999)
- Changing Lanes (2002)
- Spider-Man (2002)
- Elf (2003)
- Rent (2005)
- Revolutionary Road (2008)
- The Dictator (2012)
- Noah (2014)
- Teenage Mutant Ninja Turtles (2014)
- The Greatest Showman (2017)
