= The Easter Parade =

1976 novel by American writer Richard Yates

- Cover to the first edition
- Author: Richard Yates
- Language: English
- Genre: Novel
- Publisher: Delacorte Press/S. Lawrence
- Publication date: 1976
- Publication place: United States
- Media type: Print (hardback and paperback)
- Pages: 229 (Hardback first edition)
- ISBN: 0-385-28236-2

The Easter Parade is a novel by American writer Richard Yates. Published in 1976, Yates's book explores the tragic lives of two sisters. Along with Revolutionary Road, his debut novel, the book is considered to be Yates' finest work.

== Summary ==
The famous opening line of the novel warns of the bleak narrative to follow: "Neither of the Grimes sisters would have a happy life, and looking back it always seemed that the trouble began with their parents' divorce." Emily and Sarah are sisters who share little in terms of character, but much in terms of disappointment with their lives. Emily, the younger and more intellectual and cosmopolitan of the two, seeks love in numerous disappointing affairs and short-term relationships. Sarah, the prettier and more conventional one, marries young and bears children to an uncouth and abusive husband.

The novel begins in the 1930s, when the sisters are children, and ends in the 1970s several years after Sarah's death. It primarily revolves around Emily as the book's central character, but the book employs Yates' characteristic shifts of consciousness throughout. Their troubled, rootless mother Pookie, like many Yatesian matriarchs, is likely modeled on his own mother, who was nicknamed Dookie.

The girls’ father was a newspaper man and they inherit his talent for writing, although he separates from their vain mother early on and she brings them up in various locations in the New York suburbs. They return to Manhattan in their teens when Pooky becomes a realtor as the Second World War is ending. Sarah is older and more self assured, dark haired, and has a figure that the skinnier Emily envies. A family of English immigrants move in upstairs and it is while walking out with their son Tony to an Easter parade that he and Sarah are photographed by a newspaper. This snapshot of a seemingly carefree moment is the touchstone of the novel, from which the family’s path deviates as the years go on.

Sarah marries the boorish Tony and moves upstate, having three sons in quick succession. While he has some delusions of grandeur, he is still a blue collar worker. Sarah occasionally tries to write, and when Pooky retires she moves into a Granny flat at their house.

Emily, meanwhile, gets a scholarship to Bernard, completes her college education, and discovers herself sexually. She too marries early, but it is a disaster and she extricates herself quickly. She becomes a copywriter for a trade journal and starts a relationship with her new editor, a shy aspiring poet. He gets an academic post in the rural Midwest and she moves out there with him. This relationship stifles her, and realising that he is a failure, she returns to New York.

In the New York of the 1960’s Emily gets a career in commercial copywriting and is mentored by a female boss. She goes to parties and has a succession of interesting but unsatisfactory relationships with men. She makes an attempt to write something serious about abortion, based on her own experiences, but it lies unfinished.

When their mother is found collapsed in a heat and alcohol induced stupor, and is confined to a large sprawling psychiatric hospital, Sarah summons Emily and they reminisce fondly about their father, although there is some unexpressed jealousy on Emily’s part because it is suggested Sarah was his favourite. She sees her sister occasionally as the years go by, including when Tony brings Sarah to New York to see a show, a visit marred by Sarah getting drunk and Tony beating her up. Emily is secretly relieved when Sarah doesn’t take her up on her half-hearted offer to come and live with her in Manhattan.

Emily is in her late 30’s when her boss wins a major account for the firm, and through this work Emily meets Howard. He becomes her entire world, although he still yearns for his younger ex-girlfriend who has gone to find herself on the West Coast. They have a comfortable life together but without the security of a marriage contract, which occasionally rankles with Emily. They visit Sarah and Tony, and Emily quietly realises that Sarah is an alcoholic like their mother.

Later, Sarah has a stay in the same psychiatric hospital as Pooky, but is released only to die tragically from a drunken fall some time later. Emily takes Howard to the funeral and his reliability is contrasted with her own reliance on alcohol as a crutch. By now, Sarah’s rather earnest eldest son Peter is training to be an episcopalian priest.

Back in New York, Howard returns from one of his frequent business trips to the West Coast and announces to a not entirely surprised Emily that he has been visiting his younger ex-girlfriend all the while and that having established herself in her career, she is now ready to take him back and settle down. He departs from her life as abruptly as he had entered it. Emily is devastated but quietly seethes with unexpressed rage. Her work suffers and she is eventually fired. Sliding further into depression, she begins to drink in the daytimes, although she makes one further futile attempt at writing, a piece about being a single unemployed woman. Nearly 50, she becomes increasingly socially isolated and has to downsize her apartment. Yates subtly sets these later humiliating episodes in her life against the changing social mores of the late 60’s.

Forcing herself out for a walk one day she thinks of Sarah’s son Peter, and she arranges to visit him and his young wife. He tells her that Sarah always admired her for making her own way in life, which makes her burst into tears. She is on edge, admitting to him she no longer works, and tells him outright she suspects Tony might have had something to do with Sarah’s death. Her accusations escalate into a scathing and unwarranted attack on Peter himself as they arrive at his ideal family home. However, he does not retaliate: instead he invites her to come inside.

== Critical reception ==
Stewart O'Nan notes "The Easter Parade signaled the resurgence of Richard Yates. A year after the critically panned Disturbing the Peace, critics hailed him as an American master. They spoke now of his body of work and raved over the effortless elegance of his prose and the depth of his tragic vision." The publication of The Easter Parade marked the beginning of a relatively stable and productive period for Yates, and the book has been championed by Joan Didion, David Sedaris, Kurt Vonnegut, Larry McMurtry and Tao Lin, among others.

The novel was a finalist for the 1976 National Book Critics Circle Award.

== Film adaptation ==
In 2017, Yates’s daughter, Monica, began work on a film adaptation.

== In popular culture ==
The novel is mentioned in Woody Allen's film Hannah and Her Sisters (1986): Lee (Barbara Hershey), one of the titular sisters, thanks her brother-in-law Eliot (Michael Caine) for lending her the book. Lee tells Eliot that she "loved" the book and that he was right because "it had very special meaning" for her. Allen was attracted to the novel due to his appreciation for "books that explore the psyches of women, particularly intelligent ones."
