= Heartbreak Hotel (Porridge) =

- Porridge episode
- Episode no.: Season 2 Episode 2
- Directed by: Sydney Lotterby
- Written by: Dick Clement and Ian La Frenais
- Original air date: 31 October 1975

Episode chronology
← Previous "Just Desserts"	Next → "Disturbing the Peace"

"Heartbreak Hotel" is an episode of the British sitcom Porridge, made for the BBC. It first aired on 31 October 1975 and is the second episode of the second series. In this episode, Fletcher becomes depressed after his daughter visits him, while Godber receives a letter with bad news from his fiancée.

== Synopsis ==
After prison officer Mackay searches their cell for toilet rolls that had been stolen from the governor, missing one hidden in a water jug, Fletcher and Godber prepare for visiting time from their family. Fletcher's daughter Ingrid arrives, instead of his wife, with news that while her mother and younger sister are fine, her brother has begun chain-smoking each day. Fletcher feels disappointed his son is behaving like this while warning Ingrid to stop seeing her latest boyfriend and to wear a bra when she comes to the prison, a fact highlighted promptly by other male prisoners taking notice of her appearance. That night, Fletcher wakes up Godber to inform him that he is depressed, wishing he could be at home to ensure his kids are growing up properly.

The next day, prison officer Barrowclough visits Fletcher during recreation hour to inform him that Godber is seeing the governor. When asked why, Fletcher discovers Godber assaulted another fellow inmate for an unknown reason. That evening, Fletcher is surprised to see Godber back in their cell rather than in solitary, to which he explains that he was spared this due to mitigating circumstances. Fletcher manages to persuade him to open up about this and learns that Godber received a letter from Denise, revealing she had married another man and that the inmate he assaulted made fun of this. Fletcher offers sympathies to him upon hearing of his bad news.

On the next visiting day, Fletcher cheers up when he learns that Ingrid has heeded his words and stopped dating her current boyfriend and that she came to the prison with a bra, although not before embarrassing him again. Later that day, Fletcher revealed he had received a new ping-pong ball to replace another that was damaged. When he learns that Godber has found himself a new girlfriend, he quickly becomes angered to learn he has fallen for Ingrid and accidentally crushes the new ball.

== Episode cast ==
Actor	Role
Ronnie Barker	Norman Stanley Fletcher
Brian Wilde	Mr Barrowclough
Fulton Mackay	Mr Mackay
Richard Beckinsale	Lennie Godber
Patricia Brake	Ingrid
Margaret Flint	Mrs Godber
