= A Good School =

1978 novel by Richard Yates

- Cover to the first edition
- Author: Richard Yates
- Language: English
- Genre: Novel
- Published: 1978 (Delacorte Press/S. Lawrence)
- Publication place: United States
- Media type: Print (hardback & paperback)
- Pages: 178 (Hardback first edition)
- ISBN: 0-440-03246-6
- OCLC: 3965867
- Dewey Decimal: 813/.5/4
- LC Class: PZ4.Y335 Go 1978 PS3575.A83

A Good School is a novel by American writer Richard Yates first published in 1978. It is set at a fictional Connecticut prep school in the early 1940s and relates the coming of age of a group of mainly WASP boys who at the same time prepare themselves if half-heartedly, to go to war immediately after graduation. A Good School also delves into the complex private lives of some of the masters and their love-hate relationship with both their profession and the particular school they are teaching at.

== Plot summary ==
The school, modeled on Yates' own experiences as an adolescent at Avon Old Farms School, is called Dorset Academy, a small private institution dependent on its now senile founder, a wealthy older woman named Abigail Church Hooper, a thinly veiled reference to Avon Old Farms founder Theodate Pope Riddle. Dorset Academy is at best a second-rate institution, having the reputation of an unusual sort of prep school, where many of the students are on scholarship, and Dr. Stone, the English master, is the only "Harvard man". However, throughout the book, parents, teachers, even students insist that it is "a good school".

In the "Foreword", the first person narrator, 15-year-old William Grove, a stand-in for Yates, relates what makes his divorcée mother, decide on Dorset Academy for her son. The main body of the novel is told in the third person, with Grove retreating into a group of schoolmates only to re-emerge at the end of the book, in the "Afterword", which is told from a distance of more than 30 years. There, William Grove, now a writer, looks back nostalgically on Dorset Academy where, as the editor of the school paper, he learned "the rudiments of [his] trade".

As one of the masters puts it, the school harbors "a tremendous amount of sheer sexual energy". This is certainly true of the boys, who make a game of selecting one of the weaker boys, pinning him down on his bed and giving him a handjob to the point of ejaculation. On the other hand, they try hard to hide their erections from adults and girls, whether it is Dr. Stone's beautiful daughter Edith or the girls arriving for the annual Spring Dance. The teachers also suffer under too much sexual energy, especially Jack Draper, the chemistry master, crippled from polio, who becomes the witness of his wife's crude attempts to hide a year-and-a-half-long affair with the French master, Jean-Paul La Prade. When, toward the end of the novel, it is announced that Dorset Academy will have to close due to mounting debt, Draper decides to hang himself in his chemistry lab in humiliation. He is too weak, however, to push the chair away from under his feet and proceeds home where he reconciles with his estranged wife.

The "Foreword" and the "Afterword" create the impression of Yates, the author, directly addressing his audience and could be seen as false documents.
