= A Cure for Wellness =

- Theatrical release poster
- Directed by: Gore Verbinski
- Screenplay by: Justin Haythe
- Story by: Justin Haythe; Gore Verbinski
- Produced by: Arnon Milchan; Gore Verbinski; David Crockett
- Starring: Dane DeHaan; Jason Isaacs; Mia Goth; Harry Groener; Celia Imrie; Adrian Schiller
- Cinematography: Bojan Bazelli
- Edited by: Lance Pereira; Pete Beaudreau
- Music by: Benjamin Wallfisch
- Production companies: Regency Enterprises; Blind Wink Productions; New Regency Productions
- Distributed by: 20th Century Fox
- Release dates: December 10, 2016 (Alamo Drafthouse); February 17, 2017 (United States)
- Running time: 147 minutes
- Countries: United States; Germany; Luxembourg
- Language: English
- Budget: $40 million
- Box office: $26.6 million

A Cure for Wellness is a 2016 psychological horror film directed by Gore Verbinski and written by Justin Haythe. Haythe and Verbinski were inspired by Thomas Mann's 1924 novel The Magic Mountain while coming up with the idea for the film. Starring Dane DeHaan, Jason Isaacs, and Mia Goth, the plot follows a young executive who is sent to retrieve his company's CEO from a mysterious rehabilitation center in the Swiss Alps.

An international co-production based in the United States, Germany, and Luxembourg, the film was shot on location at various German locations, including Hohenzollern Castle in Baden-Württemberg.

A Cure for Wellness premiered at the Alamo Drafthouse Cinema on December 10, 2016, and was released theatrically on February 17, 2017, by 20th Century Fox. The film received generally mixed reviews from critics, who praised its visuals, cinematography, performances and ambition, but criticized its length, script and narrative. It grossed $26 million against its $40 million production budget, making it a box-office bomb.

== Plot ==
Lockhart, an executive at a financial services firm in New York City, is sent by the board of directors to retrieve CEO Roland Pembroke, who had abruptly decided to stay at a "wellness center" in the Swiss Alps. At the spa, Lockhart is met with resistance by the staff and Dr. Heinreich Volmer in attempting to speak with Pembroke.

Lockhart leaves, but is involved in a car crash and awakens at the center – supposedly three days later – with his leg in a plaster cast. In spite of the horrendous collision, both he and the driver suffered only minor injuries. Lockhart meets a mysterious young girl named Hannah who, among others, doses herself with a mysterious fluid from small, blue bottles.

Patient Victoria Watkins and residents of the nearby town regale a fascinated Lockhart with the history of the spa. It was built on the ruins of a castle owned 200 years ago by a baron, who desired an heir of pure blood and married his sister. Learning she was infertile, he performed hellish experiments on the peasants to find a cure. He succeeded, but after finding the carelessly buried bodies of his victims, the peasants stormed the castle and set it on fire. They captured the baron's pregnant sister and the baby was cut from her womb before she was burned. The baby was thrown into the local aquifer, but somehow survived.

Lockhart attempts to escape the center but finds no one is allowed to leave. After giving Hannah a ballerina figurine, Lockhart bikes into town with her help, leaving her in a bar and seeking out a translator for Pembroke's German medical dossier. He learns that the people of the spa suffer from dehydration despite the water they imbibe from the aquifer. Hannah, kept at the spa her entire life, explores the bar and attracts the locals' attention. Lockhart returns and gets into a fight with a man who was sexually assaulting Hannah. He is rescued by Dr. Volmer, by whom the locals are curiously cowed.

Lockhart discovers the transfusion wing of the spa is a front for macabre medical experiments, and that the water from the local aquifer possesses unique properties – toxic to humans, but with life-restoring properties for the eels living in the water. The baron had devised a process to filter the water through the bodies of humans and distill it into a life-giving essence; Volmer uses the patients as filters for this process.

This "cure" is ingested by Hannah, Volmer, and his staff to gain vastly lengthened lifespans. Lockhart realizes that his leg is not broken and he is being kept prisoner. Volmer subjects Lockhart to nightmarish treatments, warping his mind until he believes he is insane. Hannah perceives this change and gives Lockhart back the ballerina figurine, breaking him out of his delirium.

Hannah has her first menstruation, and Volmer marries her. During the reception, he leads her to a secret bedroom in the ruins of the castle and begins to rape her. Lockhart breaks into Volmer's office and discovers Volmer is the baron and Hannah is his daughter, the baby who was thrown into the well; both have been aging very slowly due to the "cure". Spurred by this information, Lockhart confronts Volmer in the bedroom.

In the ensuing fight, Volmer's face is revealed to be a mask hiding his hideous burns. Lockhart sets Volmer and the castle on fire, but is overpowered by Volmer. Hannah saves Lockhart by killing her father, who falls into the aquifer and is eaten by the eels. Lockhart and Hannah escape on her bicycle as fire engulfs the center, and crash into a car carrying Lockhart's employers, having come to retrieve him and Pembroke. Lockhart tells his employers that Pembroke died, and is ordered into the car. Ignoring their demands and muttering he feels better, he rides away with Hannah, eerily smiling as they finally escape the asylum.

== Cast ==
- Dane DeHaan as Lockhart
  - Douglas Hamilton as 9-year-old Lockhart
- Jason Isaacs as Dr. Heinreich Volmer / Baron von Reichmerl
- Mia Goth as Hannah von Reichmerl
- Harry Groener as Roland Pembroke
- Celia Imrie as Victoria Watkins
- Adrian Schiller as Deputy Director Pieterson
- Ivo Nandi as Enrico
- Tomas Norström as Frank Hill
- Ashok Mandanna as Ron Nair
- Lisa Banes as Hollis
- David Bishins as Hank Green
- Carl Lumbly as Wilson
- Magnus Krepper as Pieter, the vet
- Michael Mendl as the bartender
- Tom Flynn as Humphrey
- Eric Todd as Josh
- Jason Babinsky as Carl
- Johannes Krisch as the caretaker
- Rebecca Street as Lockhart's mother
- Bert Tischendorf as Lockhart's father
- Godehard Giese as Prim, the technician

== Production ==
=== Development ===
The screenplay for A Cure for Wellness was written by Justin Haythe, and based on a story conceived by Haythe and Verbinski, who were both inspired by the 1924 Thomas Mann novel The Magic Mountain. The central plot of Mann's novel also involves a sanitarium in the Swiss Alps. Verbinski and Haythe also state that the movie took visual and tonal inspiration from Silent era expressionist films and Universal Classic Monsters films, as well as the films Re-Animator (1985), Hellraiser (1987), Jacob's Ladder (1990), and Shutter Island (2010), the works of H.P. Lovecraft (namely The Dunwich Horror), and filmmaker Guillermo del Toro's Cronos (1993), The Devil's Backbone (2001), and Pan's Labyrinth (2006).

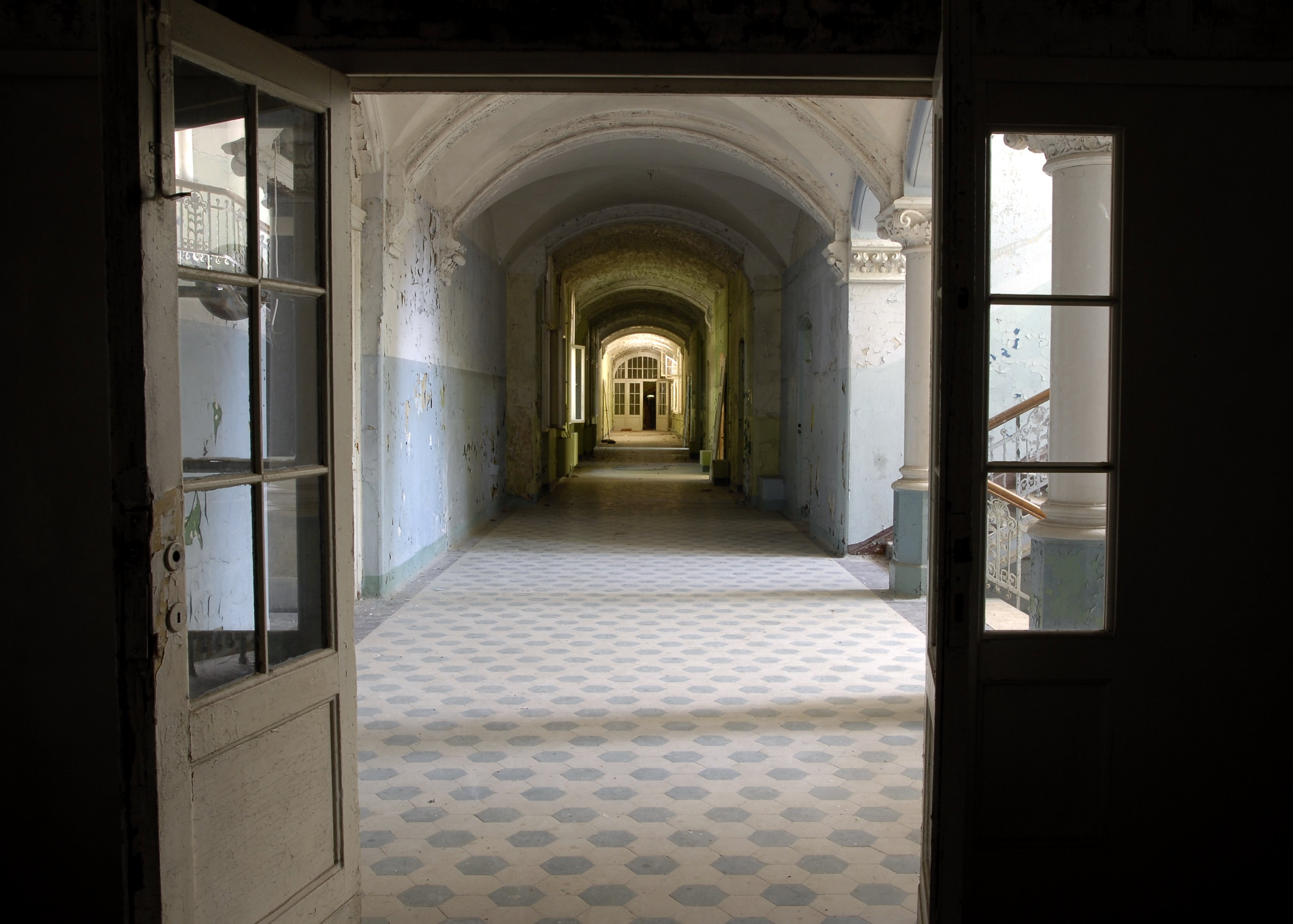
Beelitz-Heilstätten, pictured in 2005, served as a primary filming location.

=== Casting ===
The film's leads, Dane DeHaan and Mia Goth, were announced in April 2015, Jason Isaacs was added to the cast that June.

=== Filming ===
Principal photography for the film began on June 22, 2015 and took place mainly at Babelsberg Studio (co-producer) in Potsdam, Germany.

Another part of the film was shot at Hohenzollern Castle, in the German municipality of Bisingen. Eve Stewart, the set designer, stated that the castle was chosen out of a group of German castles because "rather than looking initially frightening, [it] gave the impression of being a sort of sanctuary from modern life that we'd all like to get to." The castle was closed to the public for filming from July 13 to 24, 2015. Aside from Hohenzollern, parts of the film were also shot in Saxony-Anhalt and Zella-Mehlis, Germany. An abandoned hospital in Beelitz-Heilstätten, Germany, served as a location for many of the hospital interiors. The film received funds of €8.1 million from the German Federal Film Fund (DFFF), as well as €500,000 from Medienboard Berlin-Brandenburg.

The water tank scenes took two weeks to film. DeHaan and the director communicated through an intercom, and DeHaan wore a buoyancy and body-positioning waist harness connected with wires and an oxygen tank.

Verbinski and the crew used a rubber drill in the scene where Dr. Brennan, the facility's dentist, drills through Mr. Lockhart's healthy tooth without anesthesia. According to DeHaan, he was genuinely nervous and his reaction was used in the filming. Verbinski stated that the scene had compositing, and DeHaan stated there was no outright CGI. DeHaan filmed the scene while wearing a dental gag and strapped to the chair.

In the car crash scene, DeHaan was placed into a harness inside a device described by Bryan Alexander of USA Today as being similar to a rotisserie before being tossed around. DeHaan stated that he experienced his sole filming injury there, in which his arm was dislocated from and then relocated into the socket in its shoulder.

The German actors used in the scene in which Lockhart is assaulted by elderly people had no prior experience in film acting. Alexander wrote that this scene "wasn't as torturous as it appears."

Isaacs describes Volmer as "so completely convinced that he has the right way and that he has simple answers to other people's problems," which results in the patients at the Volmer Institute placing "themselves at his mercy."

== Soundtrack ==
A Cure for Wellness was scored by Benjamin Wallfisch and recorded at Abbey Roads Studios in London. It was released by Milan Records on February 17, 2017. The soundtrack album consists of the film's score plus a stripped-down version of a Ramones song "I Wanna be Sedated" which is performed by Mirel Wagner.

== Release ==
The film premiered at the Alamo Drafthouse Cinema in Austin, Texas on December 10, 2016, as part of the Butt-Numb-A-Thon Film Festival. It subsequently received a theatrical release in the United States on February 17, 2017, by 20th Century Fox, after initially being slated for a September 23, 2016, release date.

In the United States, 20th Century Fox premiered a 40-second exclusive commercial during the 51st Super Bowl on February 5, 2017, which resembled a medication advertisement. An article in Vulture reviewed the television commercial, which noted: "This spot that aired during the Super Bowl tonight may have tricked you into thinking you were just watching a regular commercial for some terrible new medication, probably not approved by the FDA. But it turned out you were watching a trailer for a new supernatural horror film."

Two days before the film's U.S. premiere, The New York Times reported that 20th Century Fox had created a group of fake news sites as part of a viral marketing campaign for A Cure for Wellness. The film trailer also gained media attention for showing a scene where Mia Goth was in a bathtub full of eels.

== Reception ==
=== Box office ===
A Cure for Wellness grossed $8.1 million in the United States and Canada and $18.4 million in other territories for a worldwide total of $26.5 million, against a production budget of $40 million.

In the United States and Canada, the film was initially projected to gross $6–8 million from about 2,700 theaters in its opening weekend. However, after making just $300,000 from Thursday night previews and $1.5 million on its first day, weekend projections were lowered to $4 million. It ended up debuting to $4.2 million, finishing 10th at the box office.

After dropping to $1.4 million in its second weekend, the film was pulled from 97.8% of theaters (2,704 to 88), the largest such drop by percentage ever and at the time the second largest (now fifth) third-week theater drop by number of screens in history.

=== Critical response ===
Metacritic review
breakdown (unweighted)

Positive
14 (35%)
Mixed
19 (48%)
Negative
7 (18%)

A Cure for Wellness received mixed reviews from critics, with praise for its visuals, cinematography, performances and ambition, but criticism for its length, plot and structure. Critics have noted the film's Lovecraftian elements. On the review aggregation website Rotten Tomatoes, the film has an approval rating of 42% based on 210 reviews. The site's critical consensus reads, "A Cure for Wellness boasts a surfeit of visual style, but it's wasted on a derivative and predictable story whose twists, turns, and frights have all been more effectively dealt before." On Metacritic, the film has a score of 47 out of 100, based on 40 critics, indicating "mixed or average" reviews. Audiences polled by CinemaScore gave the film an average grade of "C+" on an A+ to F scale.

A.O. Scott of The New York Times compared the film to works by Martin Scorsese and Guillermo del Toro, adding: "It's all in good fun, really, though two and a half hours may be more of this kind of fun than a body can stand. You might feel like you're in the company of a manic cinephile friend breathlessly recounting his favorite movie scenes in no particular order. You admire his devotion, his taste and his scholarship, but in the end the experience is probably more satisfying for him than it is for you." Justin Chang of the Los Angeles Times wrote that the film's first hour "sustains a creepy, clammy tension that draws you along without quite accelerating into outright terror," but concluding: "The terrors we see in A Cure for Wellness are never as scary as they are beautiful, but they are never so beautiful as they are arbitrary." Andrew Lapin of National Public Radio wrote that DeHaan's "disarmingly boyish face instantly gives us the impression of someone out of his element", but felt the film was derivative and overly long.

The New Republic's Jo Livingstone criticized the film's conclusion: "The poor ending is a great shame. For Verbinski calls upon a great pantheon of stories in order to talk about daddy issues, yes, but more importantly to talk about capitalism. In the movie, two strains of moneymaking compete. Financial services go up against the wellness industry in a fully binaristic duel: city versus mountaintop, suit versus white coat, aggression versus docility. Both industries exploit those they profit from, and A Cure for Wellness is at its best when showing how contemporary philosophies of "health and wealth" are, at base, all the same old sin." Moira Macdonald of The Seattle Times was critical of the film's runtime, noting: "If Verbinski could have trimmed about an hour from the film (which weighs in at a portly 146 minutes), he might have had something... [it] looks terrific — clearly money was spent on production values, which is always a pleasant surprise in a non-franchise film...And the first half of the film nicely creates a squirmy, elegant tension." Tim Holland of TV Guide awarded the film three out of five stars, writing:

A Cure for Wellness, Gore Verbinski's eerie and atmospheric new horror film, looks like something supreme schlockmeister Roger Corman might have produced back in the day–if he'd been handed a boatload of cash and was given a green light to spend it on just one picture, that is. And that's meant as a compliment: This movie is a demented riff on notable psychological thrillers like The Shining, Shutter Island, and The Phantom of the Opera, and it tosses in the most disturbing dental-work scene since Laurence Olivier did squirm-inducing things to Dustin Hoffman in Marathon Man. It's certainly the most deliriously deranged picture you're likely to see this year.

Writing for TheWrap, Alonso Duralde praised the film's production design but criticized its narrative, saying: "While the movie is about people who are happy to remain removed from the world, not realizing that they are involved in something truly dreadful, many viewers will be all too willing to head for the exits."

=== Home media ===
The film was released on Blu-ray and DVD in North America by 20th Century Fox on June 6, 2017. The Blu-ray release features a deleted sequence, featurettes, and theatrical trailers as bonus materials, as well as digital and DVD copies.
