= Notes from the Field =

Notes from the Field (also known as Notes from the Field: Doing Time in Education and Notes from the Field: Doing Time in Education, The California Chapter) is a 2015 play, which was written and performed by Anna Deavere Smith. The play was first presented by the Berkeley Repertory Theatre, before touring and being adapted into a television movie. It discusses issues revolving around the themes such as race, class and America's school-to-prison pipeline, to mention a few.

== Background ==
The play is drawn from more than 200 interviews with students, parents, teachers and administrators caught in the school-to-prison pipeline. Smith (the author/writer of the play) references several real-life events throughout the play, such as the death of Freddie Gray and an incident where a 15-year-old black girl was restrained by police.

== Structure ==
The play consists of two acts: during the first act, Smith introduces the people in the school-to-prison pipeline, acting as each character herself. After the interval, she invites the audience to interact through call and response, culminating in Smith asking the audience to sing "Amazing Grace".

The play makes use of real-life footage, which is projected onto the walls around Smith, such as the video of a 17-year-old black girl being flung across a classroom by a white male officer.

== Characters ==
Despite it being a one-woman show, the play has Smith act as 17 different people, each one telling their own story. Smith is also joined onstage by someone playing the double bass, a role originated by composer Marcus Shelby, though it is still a solo performance.

== Television adaptation ==
Notes from the Field
- Poster
- Directed by: Kristi Zea
- Starring: Anna Deavere Smith

Production
- Producers: Gary Goetzman; Anna Deavere Smith
- Editor: Paul Snyder

Original release
- Network: HBO
- Release: February 2018

Notes from the Field was adapted into a television movie by HBO and premiered in February 2018. It was directed by Kristi Zea, edited by Paul Snyder, and produced by Gary Goetzman and Smith.

== Awards and nominations ==
- 2017 Obie Awards for Special Citations – won
- 2018 Golden Trailer Awards for Best Graphics in a TV Spot (for a Feature Film) – nominated
