= Just Desserts (Porridge) =

- Porridge episode
- Episode no.: Season 2 Episode 1
- Directed by: Sydney Lotterby
- Written by: Dick Clement and Ian La Frenais
- Original air date: 24 October 1975

Episode chronology
← Previous "Men Without Women"	Next → "Heartbreak Hotel"

"Just Desserts" is an episode of the British Porridge. It first aired on 24 October 1975, and is the first episode of the second series. In this episode, Fletcher finds a tin of pineapple chunks he stole has since been stolen, and this soon causes problems for others.

== Synopsis ==
One morning, Fletcher confronts his fellow inmates with news that a tin of pineapple chunks, which he had smuggled out of the prison's kitchens by Godber, has since been stolen. Fletcher believes there is a thief in the cell block, and later holds a meeting in his cell to discuss the matter further. After Mr Mackay breaks it up for breaching prison rules, suspicious of Fletcher's claims about what was going on, he frisks Godber after he returns from kitchen duty, but fails to find a smuggled block of margarine Godber had hidden under his chef's hat. That night, Godber and Fletcher get into an argument when the latter refuses to loan some boot polish, stating that while he believes Godber to be innocent, his trust has been misplaced since the theft of his tin.

The next morning, Mr Barrowclough visits Fletcher in the library and reveals he took the tin during a random search of his cell under Mackay's orders. Barrowclough decided to let him off the hook upon finding it by not disclosing it to the other officers involved in the search, but made the unwise decision of taking it home, whereupon his wife consumed the contents. Fletcher reveals that Barrowclough will be in trouble if this gets out, prompting him to agree to buy a new tin if Fletcher promises not to steal anymore and pay for the new tin. Later that day, Godber decides to steal another tin for Fletcher during his kitchen duties and asks fellow inmate Lukewarm to create a distraction to help conceal the act.

However, the theft is soon discovered, and Godber is given a thorough search by Mackay when he arrives. Unbeknown to everyone, Barrowclough discreetly arrives and replaces the stolen tin with the one he bought, leading to Mackay scolding the officer who raised the alarm for wasting his time. That afternoon, Godber conceals the stolen tin as a surprise for Fletcher, only for Mackay to turn up when the pair are chatting. Upon discovering the tin, Mackay refuses to listen to Fletcher's pleading that it was a plant and is taken to see the governor. As he does, Godber heads to the landing and ask if anyone has a tin opener, much to Fletcher's chagrin.

== Episode cast ==
Actor	Role
Ronnie Barker	Norman Stanley Fletcher
Brian Wilde	Mr Barrowclough
Fulton Mackay	Mr Mackay
Richard Beckinsale	Lennie Godber
Ken Jones	Ives
Sam Kelly	Warren
Tony Osoba	McLaren
Christopher Biggins	Lukewarm
Eric Dodson	Banyard
Graham Ashley	Mr Appleton
John Rudling	Mr Birchwood
Felix Bowness	Gay Gordon (uncredited)
