= Revolutionary Road (film) =

2008 film by Sam Mendes

- Theatrical release poster
- Directed by: Sam Mendes
- Screenplay by: Justin Haythe
- Based on: Revolutionary Road by Richard Yates
- Produced by: Bobby Cohen; Sam Mendes; Scott Rudin; John Hart
- Starring: Leonardo DiCaprio; Kate Winslet; Michael Shannon; Kathryn Hahn; David Harbour; Kathy Bates
- Cinematography: Roger Deakins
- Edited by: Tariq Anwar
- Music by: Thomas Newman
- Production companies: DreamWorks Pictures; Paramount Vantage; BBC Films; Neal Street Productions; Evamere Entertainment
- Distributed by: Paramount Pictures
- Release dates: December 26, 2008 (United States); January 30, 2009 (United Kingdom)
- Running time: 119 minutes
- Countries: United States; United Kingdom
- Language: English
- Budget: $45 million
- Box office: $79.5 million

Revolutionary Road is a 2008 romantic drama film directed by Sam Mendes and written by Justin Haythe, based on the 1961 novel by Richard Yates. It stars Leonardo DiCaprio and Kate Winslet as Frank and April Wheeler, with Michael Shannon, Kathryn Hahn, David Harbour and Kathy Bates in supporting roles. Set from the late 1940s to the mid-1950s, the film portrays the Wheelers' struggle to cope with their personal problems and the ensuing breakdown in their marriage. Revolutionary Road is the second onscreen collaboration for DiCaprio, Winslet and Bates, all of whom previously co-starred in Titanic (1997). The film's soundtrack was composed by Thomas Newman, his fourth collaboration with Mendes.

Development of the film adaptation began in 1961. However, a lack of commercial prospects and disagreements with the screenplay caused the project to be in limbo until the 2000s. BBC Films eventually purchased the film rights to the novel, and Haythe rewrote the screenplay. Winslet read the script and persuaded her then-husband Mendes to direct, and DiCaprio to play the role of Frank.

Revolutionary Road was theatrically released in the United States on December 26, 2008, by Paramount Pictures. The film grossed more than $79.5 million worldwide and received positive reviews from critics, who mostly praised the performances of Winslet, DiCaprio and Shannon, as well as its faithfulness to the novel. At the 81st Academy Awards, the film earned three nominations: Best Supporting Actor for Shannon, Best Art Direction, and Best Costume Design. It also received four nominations at the 62nd British Academy Film Awards and four nominations, including Best Motion Picture – Drama, at the 66th Golden Globe Awards, with Winslet winning Best Actress.

== Plot ==
In 1947, longshoreman Frank Wheeler meets April at a party. She works as a cashier, and she wants to be an actress. Frank soon secures a sales position with Knox Machines, and he and April marry. The Wheelers move to 115 Revolutionary Road in suburban Connecticut when April becomes pregnant.

The couple becomes friends with their realtor Helen Givings, her husband Howard, and neighbors Milly Campbell and her husband Shep. To their associates, the Wheelers are the perfect couple, but their relationship is troubled. April is not successful at acting, while Frank hates his tedious job. On his 30th birthday, Frank invites a secretary at work, Maureen Grube, for a drink, after which they have sex. Meanwhile, Helen asks April if she and Frank will meet her son John, who had been in a psychiatric institution, and thinks the younger couple may be able to help her son with his condition. April accepts.

Wanting to escape their suburban existence, April suggests relocating to Paris, France, so Frank can find his life's undiscovered passion. Frank initially balks, but becomes convinced. During the next several weeks, the Wheelers tell their acquaintances about their plans, but only John seems to understand their desire to leave the U.S. As the couple prepares to move, Frank is offered a promotion, and April becomes pregnant again. When Frank discovers she is contemplating an abortion, the couple have an argument. April claims they had their second child only to prove the first was not a "mistake". The next day, Frank takes the promotion and tries to accept his uneventful life. At the end of an evening at a jazz bar with the Campbells, Shep and April end up alone together. She confides her depression over the canceled Paris plans and her life in general, and the two have sex in the car. Shep professes his long-held love for April, but she rejects his interest.

The following day, Frank confesses his affair to April, hoping to reconcile with her. To his surprise, April apathetically says it does not matter, for she no longer loves him, an assertion he does not believe. When the Givings come for dinner, Frank announces the plans have changed because April is pregnant. John lambasts Frank for crushing April's hope. Angered, Frank nearly attacks John, and the Givings leave. Frank and April have an argument, and April leaves the house to think.

Frank spends the night in a drunken stupor. The next morning, he is shocked to find April in the kitchen, calmly making breakfast as if nothing had happened. Frank, unsure how to react, eats with her, then leaves for work. April goes to the bathroom, where she performs a vacuum aspiration abortion on herself. As a result, she begins to bleed and calls an ambulance. Frank arrives at the hospital, distraught, and is comforted by Shep. April dies in the hospital from blood loss. A guilt-ridden Frank moves to the city to sell computers and spend his spare time with his children.

A new couple, the Braces, buys the Wheelers' old home. While Milly and Shep have dinner with the Braces, Milly tells them about Frank and April. Shep walks out, crying; he asks Milly to never mention the Wheelers again. Years later, Helen tells her husband the Braces seem to be the best-suited couple for the Wheelers' old house. When Helen starts talking about why she disliked Frank and April, her husband turns off his hearing aid.

== Cast ==
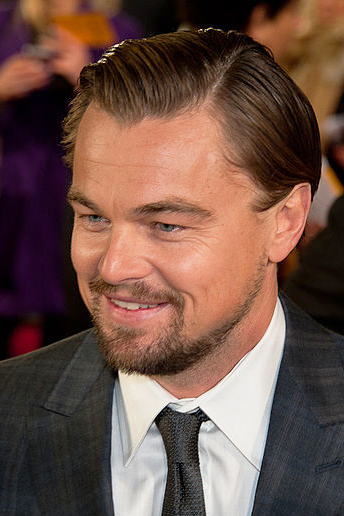
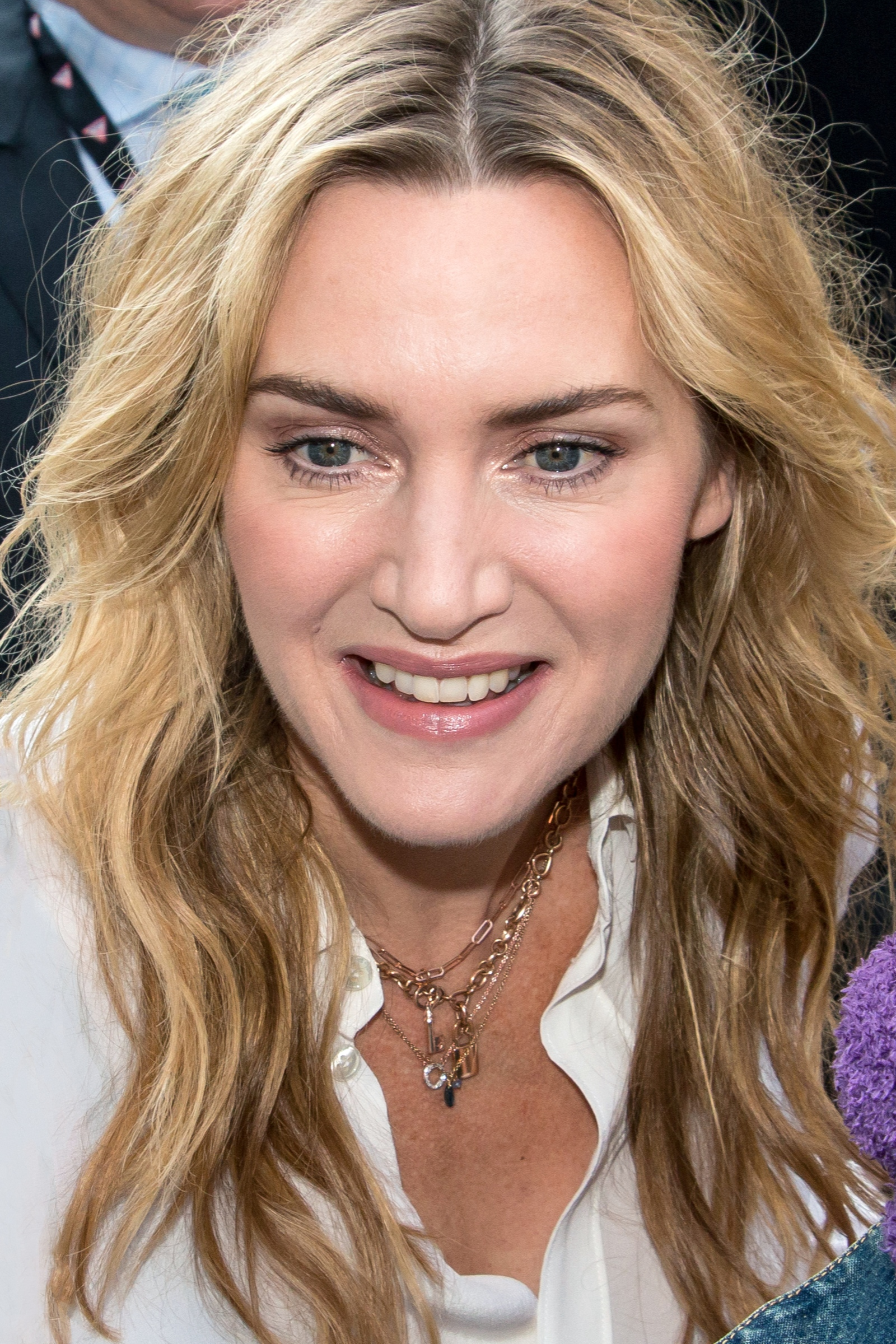
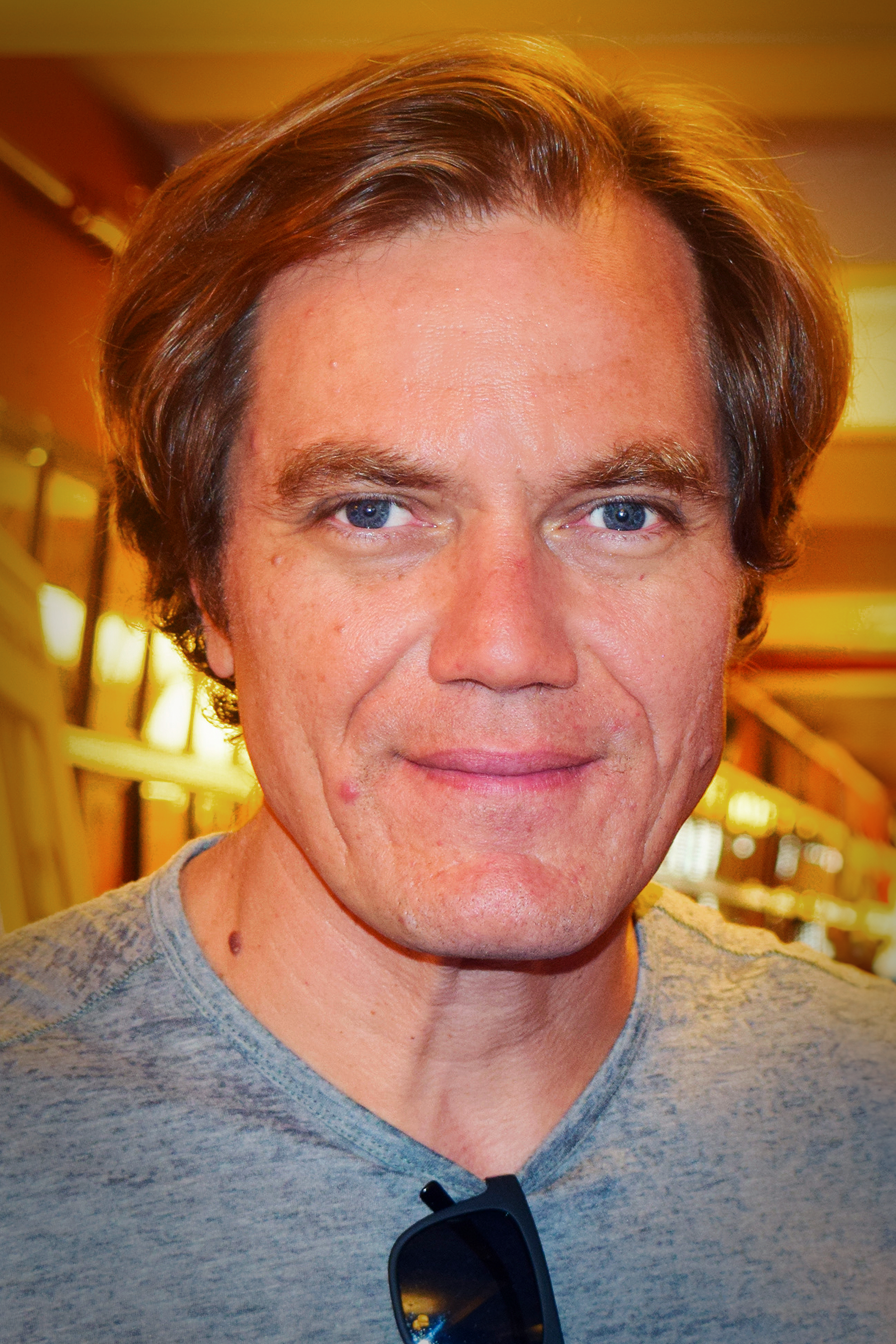
The film stars Leonardo DiCaprio, Kate Winslet, and Michael Shannon.
- Leonardo DiCaprio as Frank Wheeler
- Kate Winslet as April Wheeler
- Kathy Bates as Helen Givings
- Michael Shannon as John Givings Jr.
- Kathryn Hahn as Milly Campbell
- David Harbour as Shep Campbell
- Dylan Baker as Jack Ordway
- Richard Easton as Howard Givings
- Zoe Kazan as Maureen Grube
- Jay O. Sanders as Bart Pollock
- Max Baker as Vince Lathrop
- Max Casella as Ed Small
- Ryan Simpkins as Jennifer Wheeler
- Ty Simpkins as Michael Wheeler
- John Behlmann as Mr. Brace
- Kristen Connolly as Mrs. Brace
- Catherine Curtin as Woman in Audience

== Production ==
=== Development and casting ===
In 1961, following the publication of Richard Yates's novel, director John Frankenheimer considered making the film, but opted to make The Manchurian Candidate instead. Samuel Goldwyn Jr. expressed an interest in the film adaptation, but others in his studio told him that it lacked commercial prospects. In 1965, producer Albert S. Ruddy bought the rights but disliked the ending to the novel, and wanted to obscure April's death with "tricky camerawork". He became involved in adapting The Godfather and, five years later, as a writer-in-residence at Wichita State University, Yates offered to adapt his work for the screen. Ruddy was occupied by other projects at the time and demurred, eventually selling the rights to actor Patrick O'Neal. The actor praised the book and spent the rest of his life trying to finish a workable screenplay. Yates read O'Neal's treatment of his novel and found it "godawful", but O'Neal refused the writer's repeated offers to buy back the rights to the novel. Yates died in 1992, O'Neal two years later.

The project remained in limbo until 2001, when actor Todd Field expressed interest in adapting it for the screen. However, when told by the O'Neal estate he would be required to shoot O'Neal's script as written, Field changed his mind and opted to direct Little Children instead. Producer David Thompson eventually purchased the rights for BBC Film. In March 2007, BBC Film established a partnership with DreamWorks, and the rights to the film's distribution were transferred to DreamWorks's owner Paramount Pictures. On February 14, 2008, Paramount's other division Paramount Vantage announced it was "taking over distribution duties on Revolutionary Road", but the distribution rights reverted to Paramount Pictures when Paramount ended the production and moved the distribution and marketing operations of Paramount Vantage into the main studio. The BBC hired Justin Haythe to write the screenplay because, according to the screenwriter, he was "hugely affordable".

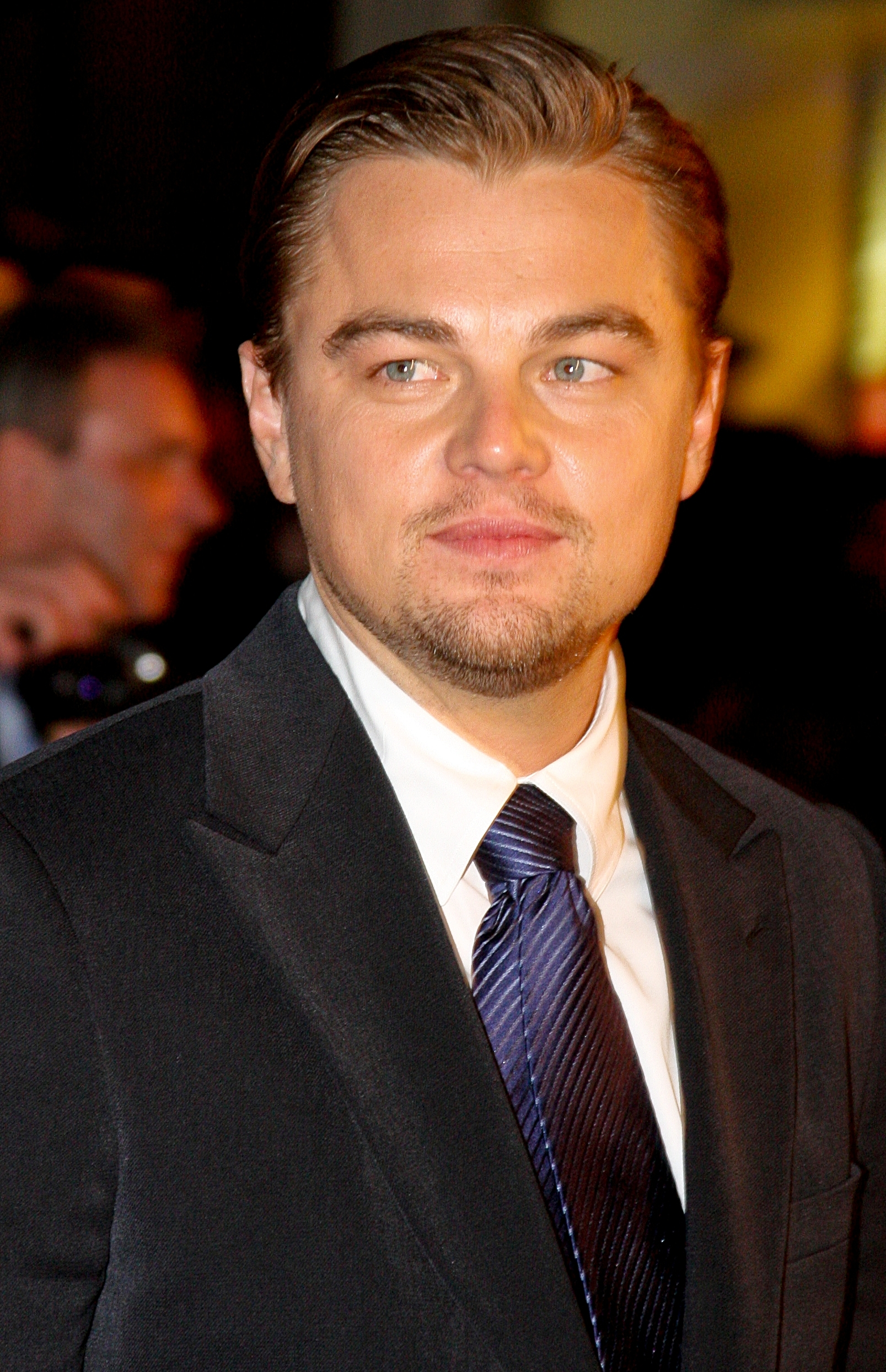
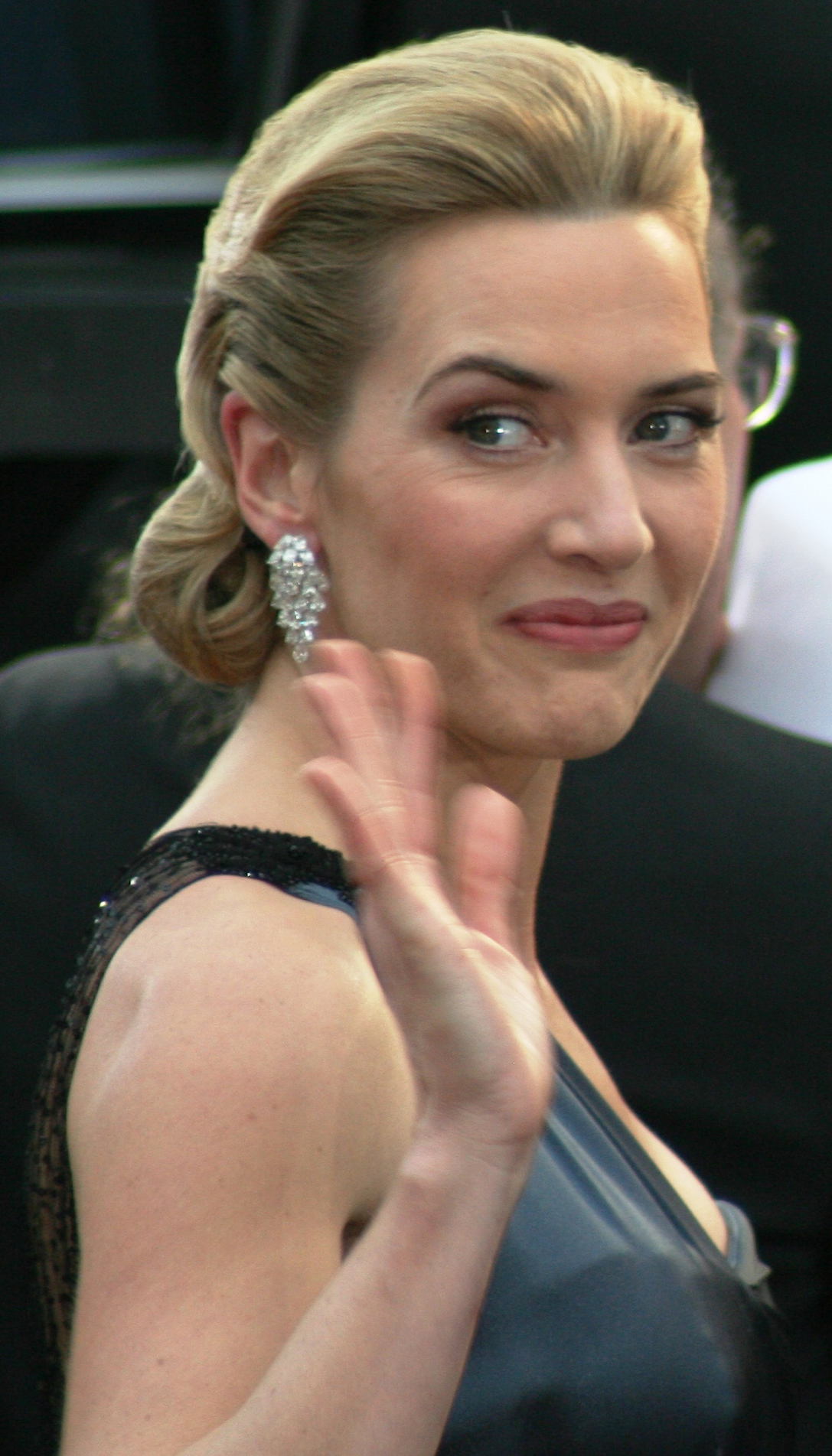
Revolutionary Road was the second onscreen collaboration between DiCaprio and Winslet.

Kate Winslet received the screenplay from her agent, then read the novel. She was impressed, and met with O'Neal's widow Cynthia O'Neal to discuss the film adaptation. Winslet sent the script to producer Scott Rudin, who suggested that her then-husband Sam Mendes would be perfect as director. Winslet gave Mendes Yates's novel and said, "I really want to play this part". He read Haythe's script and the book in quick succession. Haythe's first draft was very faithful to the novel, using large parts of Yates's own language, but Mendes told him to find ways to externalize what Frank and April do not say to each other.

Winslet sent the script to friend Leonardo DiCaprio, and persuaded him to take the part of Frank. DiCaprio was intrigued by the 1950s era and complexities of marriage; "The dynamic between Frank and April is so powerful and realistic, you feel like you're a fly on the wall watching an intimate relationship disintegrate," he said. DiCaprio said that he saw his character as "unheroic" and "slightly cowardly", and that he was "willing to be just a product of his environment". On April 24, 2007, it was announced Kathy Bates had joined the cast, along with David Harbour, Michael Shannon and Zoe Kazan. Kazan said she fought hard for the role of Maureen Grube, despite objections from casting director Debra Zane, who thought she was too young.

To prepare for the role, Winslet read The Feminine Mystique by Betty Friedan. She said, "The hardest thing about playing April, honestly, was making a very specific choice to not have her being as mannered as she is in the book. In the book, she's very, very highly strung and sometimes hysterical. She feels like a string that's literally going to snap at any moment." DiCaprio prepared for the role by watching several documentaries about the 1950s and the origin of suburbs. He and Winslet have been reluctant since Titanic to co-star in projects that show them in a romantic relationship. DiCaprio said they "just knew it would be a fundamental mistake to try to repeat any of those themes".

=== Filming ===
In mid-2007, the cast rehearsed for three-and-a-half weeks before principal photography. The film was shot mostly in sequence and on location in Darien, Connecticut. Mendes wanted to create a claustrophobic dynamic on set, so he filmed the Wheeler home interiors in a real house. The property, including the neighbor's house, were very small but featured 1950s-style architecture. The homeowners gave permission for DreamWorks to dismantle and remodel the interior and exterior. Approximately 45 tradespeople were involved with the transformation, including carpenters, interior designers and landscapers. Production designer Kristi Zea and her team had five weeks to renovate the homes. "We wanted to keep the sense of isolation that was described in the book", Zea said. Debra Schutt served as a set decorator, and said, "We ruled out anything with bright colors and anything that hit you over the head with the period. The look is really quite plain."

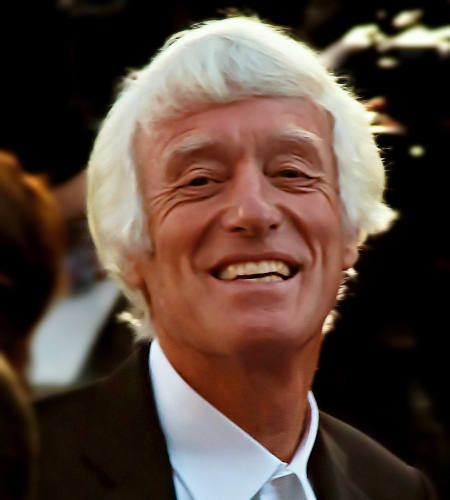
Cinematographer Roger Deakins was meticulous with the home's interior lighting.

Cinematographer Roger Deakins, who previously worked on Mendes's Jarhead, filmed with a combination of jib and handheld camera equipment. Deakins analyzed the use of every light fixture in the house; Schutt recalled, "He's quite specific about what he wants. For instance, for the night scene by the side of the road, he wanted streetlights that would give a rectangular, tapered light, and for an argument in the Wheelers' front room, he wanted a ceiling fixture that would send light down and out in a fan shape with a hard edge."

Period streetlights and automobiles were also fitted with specific light bulbs by the art department. Deakins found it difficult at times working in a small, shaded house with bulky camera equipment. Nevertheless, Winslet was impressed with his ability to "bounce light all over" using Arri Compact HMI lamps. To gradually illustrate the home's neglect and Wheelers' collapsing marriage, the crew removed props in the house and Deakins transitioned to handheld cameras, respectively. Mendes said, "I wanted a real rawness in Leo and Kate's performances in the last half-hour of the movie, and when we reached that point, I told Roger I didn't want to make any decisions [about shots]; I wanted it to be handheld, and I wanted to let the actors be explosive and unpredictable."

Recalling the on-set atmosphere, Michael Shannon said he did not feel that there were any "stars", but "a group of people united by a passion for the material and wanting to honor the book". He said Winslet and DiCaprio could make such a good performance as a couple only because of their friendship since Titanic. For Shannon, it was more important to prepare for the moment when he walked on the set than being concerned about the actors he was working with.

In the fight scenes between DiCaprio and Winslet, DiCaprio said, "So much of what happens between Frank and April in this film is what's left unsaid. I actually found it a real joy to do those fight scenes because finally, these people were letting each other have it." Winslet described her working relationship with DiCaprio as "challenging" and "physically comfortable", but she also felt "pressure" working with him, and working with her then-husband Mendes. She added, "The on-set atmosphere was very fluid in that way in that we'd all share ideas [...] without treading on each other's toes." DiCaprio found the filming process so physically and emotionally exhausting that he postponed his next film for two months.

Once filming was complete, Deakins had the film negative (Kodak Vision2 200T 5217 and 500T 5218) processed at DuArt Film and Video in New York, one of his favorite laboratories in the area. During post-production, handled by EFILM, Mendes deleted around 20 minutes of footage to keep it in the spirit of Yates's novel.

=== Music ===
Thomas Newman composed the soundtrack for Revolutionary Road; it was his fourth film score collaboration with Mendes. Consisting of fifteen tracks, Newman uses a variety of piano, strings, metallic sound effects and basslines for a haunting minimalist sound. The music was recorded at Newman Scoring Stage in Los Angeles, and the album was released on December 23, 2008.

== Release ==
=== Home media ===
Revolutionary Road was released on DVD and Blu-ray on June 2, 2009. The Blu-ray edition includes an audio commentary by Mendes, 26-minutes of deleted scenes, and two documentaries on the development of the project.

== Reception ==
=== Box office ===
Revolutionary Road premiered in Los Angeles on December 15, 2008, followed by a limited U.S. release on December 26, 2008, and a wider release (1,058 theaters) on January 23, 2009. In most other countries, it was released between January 15–30, 2009. The film earned $22.9 million at the domestic box office and $56.7 million internationally, for a moderate worldwide total of $79.6 million against a $45 million budget.

=== Critical reception ===
It takes the skill of stars Winslet and DiCaprio and director Mendes to get this film to a place where it involves and moves us ... Justin Haythe's screenplay does many good things, but it can't escape the arch lingo of the time ... his [Mendes] gift for eliciting naturalness, the core of this film finally cries out to us today, makes us see that the notion of characters struggling with life, with the despair of betraying their best selves because of what society will or won't allow, is as gripping and relevant now as it ever was. Or ever will be.

— Kenneth Turan of the Los Angeles Times

Revolutionary Road received generally positive reviews from critics. On the review aggregator Rotten Tomatoes, the film has an approval rating of 67% based on 213 reviews, with an average score of 6.80/10. The website's critical consensus reads, "Brilliantly acted and emotionally powerful, Revolutionary Road is a handsome adaptation of Richard Yates' celebrated novel". On Metacritic, the film has a weighted average score of 69 out of 100, based on 38 critics, indicating "generally favorable" reviews.

Rex Reed of The New York Observer gave the film a positive response, calling it a "flawless, moment-to-moment autopsy of a marriage on the rocks and an indictment of the American Dream gone sour" and "a profound, intelligent and deeply heartfelt work that raises the bar of filmmaking to exhilarating".

Peter Travers of Rolling Stone called the film "raw and riveting", and commented, "Directed with extraordinary skill by Sam Mendes, who warms the chill in the Yates-faithful script by Justin Haythe, the film is a tough road well worth traveling ... DiCaprio is in peak form, bringing layers of buried emotion to a defeated man. And the glorious Winslet defines what makes an actress great, blazing commitment to a character and the range to make every nuance felt."

Writing for the San Francisco Chronicle, Mick LaSalle said, "Finally, this is a movie that can and should be seen more than once. Watch it one time through her eyes. Watch it again through his eyes. It works both ways. It works in every way. This is a great American film."

Roger Ebert of the Chicago Sun-Times gave Revolutionary Road a rating of a maximum four stars, commending the acting and screenplay and calling the film "so good it is devastating". Of DiCaprio and Winslet, he said, "They are so good, they stop being actors and become the people I grew up around".

Entertainment Weekly's Owen Gleiberman graded the film B+ and commented, "The film is lavishly dark—some might say too dark—yet I'd suggest it has a different limitation: For all its shattering domestic discord, there's something remote and aestheticized about it. April brings a private well of conflict to her middle-class prison, but Winslet is so meticulous in her telegraphed despair that she intrigues us, moves us, yet never quite touches our unguarded nerves."

Joe Neumaier of the New York Daily News said:

[the film] comes close but falls short of capturing Richard Yates' terrific novel... the movie—two-thirds Mad Men, one-third American Beauty, with a John Cheever chaser—works best when focusing on the personal. Thankfully, it's there that Mendes and screenwriter Justin Haythe catch some of Yates' weighty ideas, and where Leonardo DiCaprio and Kate Winslet succeed in doing the heavy lifting... DiCaprio, round-shouldered and sleepy-eyed, and Winslet, watchful and alert, raise up each other and everything around them. Never once shadowed by Titanic, they suggest, often wordlessly, the box the Wheelers have found themselves in. Whereas the novel is told mostly from Frank's viewpoint, the movie is just as much April's, and Winslet, whether fighting back or fighting back tears, is sensational.

Some film critics gave a mixed response. David Ansen of Newsweek opined it is "impeccably mounted—perhaps too much so. Mendes [...] has an innately theatrical style: everything pops off the screen a little bigger and bolder than life [...] Instead of losing myself in the story, I often felt on the outside looking in, appreciating the craftsmanship, but one step removed from the agony on display. Revolutionary Road is impressive, but it feels like a classic encased in amber."

Kirk Honeycutt of The Hollywood Reporter described the film as a "didactic, emotionally overblown critique of the soulless suburbs", and thought it was a repeat of American Beauty. He wrote, "Once more, the suburbs are well-upholstered nightmares and its denizens clueless—other than one estranged male. Everything is boldly indicated to the audience from arch acting styles to the wink-wink, nod-nod of its design. Indeed his actors play the subtext with such fury that the text virtually disappears. Subtlety is not one of Mendes' strong suits."

Writing for Variety magazine, Todd McCarthy thought the film was "faithful, intelligent, admirably acted, superbly shot". He added, "It also offers a near-perfect case study of the ways in which film is incapable of capturing certain crucial literary qualities, in this case the very things that elevate the book from being a merely insightful study of a deteriorating marriage into a remarkable one [...] Even when the dramatic temperature is cranked up too high, the picture's underpinnings seem only partly present, to the point where one suspects that what it's reaching for dramatically might be all but unattainable—perhaps approachable only by Pinter at his peak." McCarthy later changed his opinion, calling Revolutionary Road "problematic", and that it "has some issues that just won't go away". He concludes that Revolutionary Road suffers in comparison to Billy Wilder's The Apartment and Richard Quine's Strangers When We Meet because of its "narrow vision", arguing that the television series Mad Men handles the issues of conformity, frustration and hypocrisy "with more panache and precision".

Top ten lists

The film appeared on several critics' top ten lists of the best films of 2008.

- 1st – Mick LaSalle, San Francisco Chronicle
- 2nd – Rex Reed, New York Observer
- 6th – Peter Travers, Rolling Stone
- 8th – James Berardinelli, ReelViews
- 9th – David Denby, The New Yorker
- No order – Joe Neumaier, New York Daily News
- No order – Roger Ebert, Chicago Sun-Times (alphabetical top 20 list)

== Awards and nominations ==
List of awards and nominations
Awards	Category	Recipients	Result	Ref.
Academy Awards	Best Supporting Actor	Michael Shannon	Nominated	
Academy Awards	Best Art Direction	Debra Schutt and Kristi Zea	Nominated	
Academy Awards	Best Costume Design	Albert Wolsky	Nominated	
British Academy Film Awards	Best Actress	Kate Winslet	Nominated	
British Academy Film Awards	Best Costume Design	Albert Wolsky	Nominated	
British Academy Film Awards	Best Production Design	Debra Schutt and Kristi Zea	Nominated	
British Academy Film Awards	Best Adapted Screenplay	Justin Haythe	Nominated	
Chicago Film Critics Association Awards	Best Supporting Actor	Michael Shannon	Nominated	
Costume Designers Guild Awards	Excellence in Period Film	Albert Wolsky	Nominated	
Detroit Film Critics Society	Best Actor	Leonardo DiCaprio	Nominated	
Detroit Film Critics Society	Best Actress	Kate Winslet	Won	
Detroit Film Critics Society	Best Supporting Actor	Michael Shannon	Nominated	
Detroit Film Critics Society	Best Cast	Revolutionary Road	Nominated	
Golden Globe Awards	Best Motion Picture – Drama	Revolutionary Road	Nominated	
Golden Globe Awards	Best Actor – Motion Picture Drama	Leonardo DiCaprio	Nominated	
Golden Globe Awards	Best Actress – Motion Picture Drama	Kate Winslet	Won	
Golden Globe Awards	Best Director – Motion Picture	Sam Mendes	Nominated	
Houston Film Critics Society Awards	Best Actor	Leonardo DiCaprio	Nominated	
Houston Film Critics Society Awards	Best Actress	Kate Winslet	Nominated	
Houston Film Critics Society Awards	Best Cinematography	Roger Deakins	Nominated	
Houston Film Critics Society Awards	Best Original Score	Thomas Newman	Nominated	
London Film Critics Circle Awards	Actress of the Year	Kate Winslet	Nominated	
New York Film Critics Circle Awards	Best Actress	Kate Winslet	3rd Place	
Online Film Critics Society Awards	Best Actress	Kate Winslet	Nominated	
Online Film Critics Society Awards	Best Supporting Actor	Michael Shannon	Nominated	
Palm Springs International Film Festival	Ensemble Cast	Leonardo DiCaprio, Kate Winslet, Michael Shannon, Kathryn Hahn, David Harbour, Kathy Bates, Dylan Baker and Zoe Kazan	Won	
Satellite Awards	Best Film – Drama	Revolutionary Road	Nominated	
Satellite Awards	Best Actor – Motion Picture Drama	Leonardo DiCaprio	Nominated	
Satellite Awards	Best Supporting Actor – Motion Picture	Michael Shannon	Won	
Satellite Awards	Best Adapted Screenplay	Justin Haythe	Nominated	
Satellite Awards	Best Art Direction and Production Design	Kristi Zea, Teresa Carriker-Thayer, John Kasarda and Nicholas Lundy	Nominated	
Screen Actors Guild Awards	Outstanding Performance by a Female Actor in a Leading Role	Kate Winslet	Nominated	
St. Louis Gateway Film Critics Association Awards	Best Actor	Leonardo DiCaprio	Nominated	
St. Louis Gateway Film Critics Association Awards	Best Actress	Kate Winslet	Won	
St. Louis Gateway Film Critics Association Awards	Best Supporting Actor	Michael Shannon	Nominated	
St. Louis Gateway Film Critics Association Awards	Best Cinematography	Roger Deakins	Nominated	
Vancouver Film Critics Circle Awards	Best Actress	Kate Winslet	Won	
