= The Clearing (film) =

2004 film by Pieter Jan Brugge

- Theatrical release poster
- Directed by: Pieter Jan Brugge
- Screenplay by: Justin Haythe
- Story by: Pieter Jan Brugge; Justin Haythe
- Produced by: Pieter Jan Brugge; Jonah Smith; Palmer West
- Starring: Robert Redford; Helen Mirren; Willem Dafoe
- Cinematography: Denis Lenoir
- Edited by: Kevin Tent
- Music by: Craig Armstrong
- Production companies: Blue Ridge Motion Pictures; Fox Searchlight Pictures; Mediastream Dritte Film GmbH & Co. Beteiligungs KG; Thousand Words; Wildwood Enterprises
- Distributed by: Fox Searchlight Pictures
- Release dates: July 2, 2004 (United States); December 23, 2004 (Germany)
- Running time: 95 minutes
- Countries: Germany; United States
- Language: English
- Box office: $12.5 million

The Clearing is a 2004 American crime thriller film and the directorial debut of film producer Pieter Jan Brugge. The film is loosely based on the real-life kidnapping and murder of Dutch businessman Gerrit Jan Heijn that took place in the Netherlands in 1987. The screenplay was written by Justin Haythe.

== Plot ==
Wayne Hayes and his wife Eileen are living the American dream in a wealthy Pittsburgh suburb, having raised two children and built up a successful business from scratch. He is looking forward to a peaceful retirement with Eileen. Everything changes when Wayne is kidnapped in broad daylight by a former employee, Arnold Mack. While Wayne tries negotiating with the kidnapper, Eileen works with the FBI to try to secure her husband's release. During the investigation, Eileen learns that Wayne has continued an extramarital affair that he promised to end months previously.

Eileen is eventually instructed to deliver the ransom to the kidnapper, but Arnold takes the money without returning her husband; Arnold murdered Wayne the day of the kidnapping. Eileen's ordeal takes place over the course of a week, but the film shows Wayne's kidnapping as if it were happening at the same time.

Authorities eventually catch Arnold when he starts spending the ransom money in the neighborhood where he lives. At a local grocery store, he uses a $100 bill for a purchase. The store manager calls to verify the serial number on the $100 bill is on a watch list the FBI distributed to local businesses. During questioning, police ask Arnold if he wanted to be caught, and he admits that the kidnapping was to get money for his depressed wife—but it took him all day to bring himself to kill Wayne and he could not live with the guilt of his crime. In the end, Eileen receives a loving note written by Wayne before his death.

== Cast ==
- Robert Redford as Wayne Hayes
- Helen Mirren as Eileen Hayes
- Willem Dafoe as Arnold Mack
- Alessandro Nivola as Tim Hayes
- Matt Craven as FBI Agent Ray Fuller
- Melissa Sagemiller as Jill Hayes
- Wendy Crewson as Louise Miller
- Larry Pine as Tom Finch
- Diana Scarwid as Eva Finch

== Locations ==
The film was shot in and around Asheville, North Carolina and in downtown Pittsburgh, Pennsylvania.

== Reception ==
The film has received mixed reviews. On Rotten Tomatoes, the film has an approval rating of 43%, based on 134 reviews, with an average rating of 5.60/10. The website's critical consensus reads: "Though it has an excellent cast, this emotionally detached movie is the kind that one admires more than enjoys." On Metacritic, the film has a weighted average score of 60 out of 100, based on 34 critics, indicating "mixed or average reviews".

According to Roger Ebert, writing in the Chicago Sun-Times, it "doesn't feel bound by the usual formulas of crime movies. What eventually happens will emerge from the personalities of the characters, not from the requirements of Hollywood endings." Peter Travers of Rolling Stone wrote, "The pleasures of this endeavor, directed with a keen eye for detail by Pieter Jan Brugge, come from what the actors bring to the material."

Ty Burr, in the Boston Globe, felt that the film had a "lack of emotion" and "could have been more than it is". M. Torreiro, in the Spanish newspaper El País, described the film a "tense thriller, cramped and made of downtime and sensations on the limit, a strange film."
