= Pieter Jan Brugge =

Dutch film producer (born 1955)

- Born: 6 November 1955 (age 70); Deventer, Netherlands
- Education: Netherlands Film Academy (BA); American Film Institute (MFA)
- Occupation: Film producer

Pieter Jan Brugge (born 6 November 1955) is a Dutch film producer.

== Biography ==
He was born in Deventer, Netherlands. In 1979, he graduated from the Netherlands Film and Television Academy in Amsterdam, and was subsequently awarded a scholarship by the Dutch Ministry of Cultural Affairs to study in the United States at the AFI Conservatory (AFI), and earned the Master of Fine Arts in AFI.

He has worked frequently with the following directors: Edward Zwick, Alan J. Pakula, and Michael Mann.

He directed The Clearing in 2004, and acted in 127 Hours in 2010.

== Filmography ==
Executive producer

- Breakin' 2: Electric Boogaloo (1984)
- Consenting Adults (1992)
- The Vanishing (1993)
- Fatal Instinct (1993)
- Heat (1995)
- Bosch (2014–2017)

Producer

- The Pelican Brief (1993)
- Clifford (1994)
- Bulworth (1998)
- The Insider (1999)
- The Clearing (2004) (Also writer and director)
- Miami Vice (2006)
- Defiance (2008)
- Love & Other Drugs (2010)

Co-producer

- Loverboy (1989)
- Glory (1989)

Actor

- 127 Hours (2010)
