= Richard Yates (novelist) =

American writer (1926–1992)

- Yates in 1960
- Born: Richard Walden Yates; February 3, 1926; Yonkers, New York, U.S.
- Died: November 7, 1992 (aged 66); Birmingham, Alabama, U.S.
- Occupations: Novelist, short story writer
- Writing career
- Movement: Realism

Richard Walden Yates (February 3, 1926 – November 7, 1992) was an American fiction writer identified with the mid-century "Age of Anxiety." His first novel, Revolutionary Road, was a finalist for the 1962 National Book Award, while his first short story collection, Eleven Kinds of Loneliness, brought comparisons to James Joyce. Critical acclaim for his writing, however, was not reflected in commercial success during his lifetime.

Interest in Yates has revived somewhat since his death, partly because of an influential 1999 essay by Stewart O'Nan in the Boston Review, a 2003 biography by Blake Bailey and the 2008 Academy Award-nominated and Golden Globe-winning film Revolutionary Road starring Kate Winslet and Leonardo DiCaprio.

== Life and career ==
Yates was born in Yonkers, New York, the son of Vincent Yates and Ruth Walden Maurer. He came from an unstable home; his parents divorced when he was three, and much of his childhood was spent in many different towns and residences. He first became interested in journalism and writing while attending Avon Old Farms School in Avon, Connecticut. After leaving Avon, Yates joined the Army, serving in France and Germany during World War II. By the middle of 1946, he was back in New York.

Upon his return to New York City, he worked as a journalist, freelance ghost writer (briefly writing speeches for Attorney General Robert F. Kennedy) and publicity writer for Remington Rand Corporation. His career as a novelist began in 1961 with the publication of the well received Revolutionary Road. In 1962, he wrote the screenplay for a film adaptation of William Styron's Lie Down in Darkness, which had not yet been produced as of 2022. He subsequently taught writing at Columbia University, the New School for Social Research, Boston University (where his papers are archived), at the University of Iowa Writer's Workshop, at Wichita State University, the University of Southern California Master of Professional Writing Program, and at the University of Alabama in Tuscaloosa.

In 1948, he married Sheila Bryant, the daughter of Marjorie Gilhooley Bryant and British actor Charles Bryant, who lived with Broadway actress and silent-film star Alla Nazimova from 1912 to 1925 during the height of her wealth and fame. Richard and Sheila Yates had two daughters, Sharon and Monica, before divorcing in 1959. His daughter Monica dated comedian Larry David and was the inspiration for Elaine Benes on David's sitcom Seinfeld. In 1968, Yates married Martha Speer and they had a daughter, Gina. A heavy smoker his entire life, in 1992 he died of emphysema and complications from minor surgery in Birmingham, Alabama.

== Novels ==
Yates's fiction was autobiographical in nature, and his fiction included much of his own life. Yates was born in 1926, making him 16 in 1942, the same age as Phil Drake in Cold Spring Harbor; he was 17 in 1943, the same age as William Grove in A Good School; he was 18 in 1944, the same age as Robert Prentice in A Special Providence; he was 29 in 1955, the same age as Frank Wheeler in Revolutionary Road; and he was 36 in 1962, one year younger than Emily Grimes in The Easter Parade.

Yates's first novel, Revolutionary Road, was a finalist for the National Book Award that year (alongside Joseph Heller's Catch-22, J. D. Salinger's Franny and Zooey, and the winning novel, Walker Percy's The Moviegoer). Yates was championed by writers as diverse as Kurt Vonnegut, Dorothy Parker, William Styron, Tennessee Williams and John Cheever. Yates's brand of realism was a direct influence on writers including Andre Dubus, Raymond Carver and Richard Ford.

For much of his life, Yates's work met almost universal critical acclaim, yet not one of his books sold over 12,000 copies in hardcover first edition. All of his novels were out of print in the years after his death, though his reputation has substantially increased posthumously, and many of his novels have since been reissued in new editions. This current success can be largely traced to the influence of Stewart O'Nan's 1999 essay in the Boston Review, "The Lost World of Richard Yates: How the great writer of the Age of Anxiety disappeared from print".

With the revival of interest in Yates's life and work after his death, Blake Bailey published the first in-depth biography of Yates, A Tragic Honesty: The Life and Work of Richard Yates (2003). Film director Sam Mendes directed Revolutionary Road, a 2008 film based on the 1961 novel of the same name. The film was nominated for BAFTAs, Golden Globes, Academy Awards, and others. Kate Winslet thanked Yates for writing such a powerful novel and providing such a strong role for a woman while accepting a Golden Globe Award for Best Actress for her role in the film.

== Short fiction ==
Yates was also an acclaimed author of short stories. Eleven Kinds of Loneliness, Yates's first collection, followed the publication of his first novel, Revolutionary Road, by a single year. It was compared favorably to Joyce's Dubliners (all but one of its stories take place in and around the boroughs of New York City rather than Joyce's Dublin) and eventually achieved a kind of cult status among fiction writers despite its relative obscurity. One later New York Times essay by Robert Towers praised Yates's "exposure of the small fiercely defended dignities and much vaster humiliations of characters who might have been picked almost at random from the fat telephone book of the Borough of Queens."

Yates's second collection, Liars in Love, appeared nearly 20 years later, in 1981, and was again met with a positive critical reception. Christopher Lehmann-Haupt, writing for the Times, called the stories "wonderfully crafted", and concluded that "every detail of this collection stays alive and fresh in one's memory."

Despite this, only one of Yates's short stories ever appeared in The New Yorker (after repeated rejections), and this was done posthumously. "The Canal" was published in the magazine nine years after the author's death, to celebrate the 2001 release of The Collected Stories of Richard Yates, a collection that was again met with great critical fanfare.

== In popular culture ==
Films

- In the movie Lonesome Jim (2005), the protagonist cites Yates as one of his favorite authors, adding that all Yates's books were out of print by the time the author died.
- In Woody Allen's film Hannah and Her Sisters (1986), Lee (Barbara Hershey) thanks Elliott (Michael Caine) for lending her The Easter Parade, which she says was great.

Novels

- Nick Hornby's 2005 novel A Long Way Down features several suicidal characters; one of them carries a copy of Revolutionary Road so that it may be discovered on his corpse.
- Tao Lin's 2010 novel is titled Richard Yates.
- Adelle Waldman's 2013 novel The Love Affairs of Nathaniel P. was influenced by Revolutionary Road.

Other

- Singer Tanita Tikaram's 1992 album title Eleven Kinds of Loneliness was borrowed from Yates's 1962 collection of short stories.
- The character of Elaine Benes on TV series Seinfeld was loosely based on his daughter Monica, who had been the girlfriend and later friend of co-creator Larry David. David's first meeting with the writer was the basis for "The Jacket" episode of Seinfeld's second season, in which Jerry Seinfeld and George meet Elaine's curmudgeonly novelist father, portrayed by Lawrence Tierney. The suede jacket incident depicted in that episode really did happen.

== Bibliography ==
Novels

- Revolutionary Road (1961)
- A Special Providence (1969)
- Disturbing the Peace (1975)
- The Easter Parade (1976)
- A Good School (1978)
- Young Hearts Crying (1984)
- Cold Spring Harbor (1986)

Short stories

- Eleven Kinds of Loneliness (1962)
- Liars in Love (1981)
- The Collected Stories of Richard Yates (2004)

== Filmography ==
- Lie Down in Darkness (unproduced screenplay) (1962)
- The Bridge at Remagen (screenplay) (1969)
- Revolutionary Road (posthumous adaptation of Yates's novel) (2008)
