= Cold Spring Harbor (novel) =

1986 novel by Richard Yates

First edition (publ. Delacorte Press)

Cold Spring Harbor was the final novel by American writer Richard Yates. It was published by Delacorte Press in 1986.
