= Disturbing the Peace (2009 film) =

Disturbing the peace
- Directed by: Ai Weiwei
- Written by: Ai Weiwei
- Starring: Ai Weiwei; Pu Zhiqiang; Zuoxiao Zuzhou
- Music by: Zuoxiao Zuzhou
- Distributed by: 79 minutes
- Release date: 2009
- Country: China
- Language: Mandarin

Disturbing the Peace (Chinese: 老妈蹄花; pinyin: Lǎomā tíhuā) is a 2009 documentary film directed by the Chinese artist Ai Weiwei. In it, he and Pu Zhiqiang talk to police to discover what happened to a female colleague after a police raid on their way to Chengdu as witnesses in the trial of the civil rights advocate Tan Zuoren.
