= Kristi Zea =

American costume designer, and film producer (born 1948)

- Born: Kristina Gwyn Zea; October 24, 1948 (age 77); New York City, United States
- Education: B.A. English literature, Columbia University School of General Studies, 1974
- Occupations: Production designer, costume designer, art director, film and television director, producer.
- Years active: 1978–present
- Spouse: Michael Kuhling (divorced)
- Children: Norma Kuhling

Kristina Gwyn Zea (born October 24, 1948) is an American production designer, costume designer, art director, director and producer in film and television. Born and educated in New York City, she discovered she had a talent for design while working as a stylist for a commercial photographer. Her career in production design blossomed in the 1980s and 1990s as she worked on numerous films for several directors—including Alan Parker, James L. Brooks, Jonathan Demme and Martin Scorsese, across a wide selection of genres, including period, contemporary, drama, and horror. She has also directed several HBO films.

== Early life and education ==
Kristina Gwyn Zea was born on October 24, 1948, in New York City. Her father was James Gwyn Zea; her mother, Alice Joy Zea (née Karl), was a list broker. She has one sister, Marni Zea Clippinger. She grew up in the Stuyvesant Town residential development in Manhattan.

Zea attended the High School of Music & Art in Manhattan. She then studied at Middlebury College in Vermont for two years before transferring to the Columbia University School of General Studies, where she earned her B.A. in English literature. While she intended to become a journalist, as an undergraduate student she supported herself working as a stylist for a commercial photographer and found she had a talent for it. She continued on this job for four years after graduation.

== Career ==
=== Costume and production design ===
Zea was hired by Woody Allen as the design coordinator for his 1978 film Interiors. She designed costumes for three Alan Parker films, Fame (1980), Shoot the Moon (1982), and Birdy (1984), and also worked as art director for Parker's Angel Heart (1987). She first worked with Martin Scorsese as production designer for his segment of New York Stories. She worked for James L. Brooks as costume designer on Terms of Endearment (1983), associate producer on Broadcast News (1987), and producer on As Good As It Gets (1997). She also designed "outrageous" costumes for the 1986 stage production of The Balcony, directed by JoAnne Akalaitis, at the American Repertory Theater.

One of the most important things a production designer can do is to imbue the sets with as much character as you can. It's about providing a container in which the story can thrive, without banging it over the audience's head.

— Kristi Zea, 2018

Zea's career in film production design blossomed in the late 1980s and 1990s with her creation of a variety of innovative sets. These include Jonathan Demme's Married to the Mob (1988), in which she designed "wonderfully tacky" sets including a Florida hotel room dominated by "the color turquoise to demonstrate the mob's lavish and cheesy taste in décor", Martin Scorsese's GoodFellas (1990), and Demme's The Silence of the Lambs (1991), Philadelphia (1993), and Beloved (1998). For The Silence of the Lambs, Zea created visual imagery for sets for which no description existed in the novel or screenplay. For example, the script tersely described the room in which the police officers found their fallen comrades as "a snapshot from hell"; Zea created the look and the contents. She similarly invented the look of Dr. Lecter's dungeon-like room with its unusual paraphernalia, and Demme used this visual imagery "to pace the film in the absence of words". Demme told The New York Times: "Neither of us had much of a stomach for the images of 'Lambs' – but it would have hurt to have someone with a taste for gore. Kristi's sensitivity made it possible for a lot of people to watch the film". In 2004 she worked for Demme again on The Manchurian Candidate.

Zea's production design for Revolutionary Road (2008), for which she received an Oscar nomination, entailed the dismantling, reconstruction and redecoration of two houses in Darien, Connecticut. For the home of the Wheelers, Zea put in a different kitchen and used "simple and spare" wall treatments and furnishings to depict the couple's hesitancy to adapt to suburban life. The homeowners were paid in "the low six figures" for the breaking apart and rebuilding of their homes, as well as use of a beach house in Rowayton throughout the production.

=== As producer ===
Zea served as associate producer for the 1986 film Lucas. She also served as associate producer and second unit director on Philadelphia (1993). She co-produced As Good as It Gets (1997) with James L. Brooks and Bridget Johnson. She also produced and production designed The Joneses (2009) starring Demi Moore and David Duchovny.

=== As director ===
Zea directed a 1990 music video for Laurie Anderson, and a 1991 half-hour HBO television film, A Domestic Dilemma, produced by Jonathan Demme. She produced and directed her first documentary film, Everybody Knows…Elizabeth Murray, which premiered at the 2016 Tribeca Film Festival and later screened on PBS' American Masters. In 2018, she directed Notes from the Field for HBO. starring Anna Deavere Smith.

=== Other activities ===
Zea was a faculty member of the New York University Tisch School of the Arts from 2005 to 2008.

== Accolades ==
Zea has received two Academy Award nominations. She was nominated in the category of Best Art Direction for Revolutionary Road (2008), and in the category of Best Picture for As Good as It Gets (1997), which she co-produced. In 2007 she was nominated for the Art Directors Guild Award for Excellence in Production Design for a Contemporary Film for her work on The Departed (2006). In 1999 she was nominated for a Golden Satellite Award for Best Art Direction for Beloved (1998). In 2004 she received a Muse Award from the New York Women in Film & Television.

== Personal life ==
Zea and her former husband, Michael Kuhling, an architect, have one daughter, Norma Kuhling. Since 2004, Zea has resided in Valley Cottage, New York, in a home she redecorated with an eclectic selection of items, including props from The Silence of the Lambs, Sleepers, and The Departed.

Zea presents films and moderates discussion panels for the Rivertown Film Festival.

== Credits ==
=== Costume design ===
- Fame (1980)
- Endless Love (1981)
- Shoot the Moon (1982)
- Exposed (1983)
- Terms of Endearment (1983)
- Unfaithfully Yours (1984)
- The Little Drummer Girl (1984)
- Birdy (1984)
- Silverado (1985)

=== Production design ===
- Lucas (1986)
- Angel Heart (1987)
- Married to the Mob (1988)
- Miss Firecracker (1989)
- GoodFellas (1990)
- The Silence of the Lambs (1991)
- The Super (1991)
- Lorenzo's Oil (1992)
- Philadelphia (1993)
- The War (1994)
- Sleepers (1996)
- Beloved (1998)
- Wonderland (2000)
- The Family Man (2000)
- Changing Lanes (2002)
- Red Dragon (2002)
- The Manchurian Candidate (2004)
- The Departed (2006)
- The Brave One (2007)
- Revolutionary Road (2008)
- Confessions of a Shopaholic (2009)
- The Joneses (2009)
- Wall Street: Money Never Sleeps (2010)
- Tower Heist (2011)
- Black Nativity (2013)
- The Leftovers (TV series, 2014)
- The Intern (2015)
- American Odyssey (TV series, 2015)
- The Comedian (2016)
- A Tree a Rock a Cloud (Short, 2017)
- New Amsterdam (TV series, 2018-2020)
- The Watcher (TV series, 2022)
- Daddio (2023)
- Office Romance (2026)

== Sources ==
- Bethany, Marilyn (July 15, 1991). "Designing Woman". New York.
- Cooper, Katherine (July 6, 2018). "Here's How One of Hollywood's Most Prominent Production Designers Decorated Her Own Home in Upstate New York". Architectural Digest.
- Heisner, Beverly (2004). Production Design in the Contemporary American Film: A Critical Study of 23 Movies and Their Designers. McFarland. ISBN 9780786418657.
- Kagan, Jeremy Paul (2012). Directors Close Up 2: Interviews with Directors Nominated for Best Film by the Directors Guild of America, 2006-2012. Vol. 2. Rowman & Littlefield. ISBN 9780810883918.
- LoBrutto, Vincent (2002). The Filmmaker's Guide to Production Design. Simon and Schuster. ISBN 9781621535874.
- Monaco, James (1992). The Movie Guide. Perigee Books. ISBN 9780399517808.
- Plotkins, Marilyn (2005). The American Repertory Theatre Reference Book: The Brustein Years. Greenwood Publishing Group. ISBN 9780313289132.
