= Liars in Love =

Collection of short stories by Richard Yates

- First edition
- Author: Richard Yates
- Language: English
- Publisher: Delacorte/S. Lawrence
- Publication date: 1981
- Publication place: United States
- Media type: Print (hardback & paperback)
- Pages: 272 pp
- ISBN: 0-440-04669-6
- OCLC: 7554938
- Dewey Decimal: 813/.54 19
- LC Class: PS3575.A83 L5

Liars in Love is a collection of short stories by Richard Yates, published in 1981. It was his second collection of short fiction.

The stories were written in the 1970s, with some appearing in The Atlantic and Ploughshares, but are mostly set between the 1940s and early 1960s.

All the stories were subsequently included in the posthumously released Richard Yates, The Collected Stories (2004).

== Reception ==
The New York Times called the collection "wonderfully crafted" and praised its variety and vivid detail. The reviewer suggested that its themes are sufficiently related "for the stories to be collapsed into a single history ... autobiographical perhaps".

Almost twenty years later, when Yates's books, including this collection, were out of print, Boston Review also detected an autobiographical thread. It called the opening story, "Oh, Joseph, I’m So Tired" the gem of the collection, but found the others strong as well. It suggested that in this collection Yates was for once in step with the current trends in American writing. It noted that the contemporary critical reaction was divided between those who saw the stories as unexceptional exemplars of the new fiction represented by Raymond Carver, and those who saw them distinguished by their depth of characterization.

== Contents ==
- "Oh, Joseph, I'm So Tired"
- "A Natural Girl"
- "Trying Out for The Race"
- "Liars in Love"
- "A Compassionate Leave"
- "Regards at Home"
- "Saying Goodbye to Sally"
