= Disturbing the Peace (Porridge) =

- Porridge episode
- Episode no.: Season 2 Episode 3
- Directed by: Sydney Lotterby
- Written by: Dick Clement and Ian La Frenais
- Original air date: 7 November 1975

Episode chronology
← Previous "Heartbreak Hotel"	Next → "No Peace for the Wicked"

"Disturbing the Peace" is an episode of the British sitcom Porridge, made for the BBC. It first aired on 7 November 1975, and is the third episode of the second series. In this episode, Mr Mackay leaves Slade Prison to go on a course, though the prisoners soon wish for him back when they discover how awful his replacement is.

== Synopsis ==
One day, Fletcher visits the governor in his office to show him a stack of new books for him to check, before they will be stocked in the library. While he is distracted using one of these to prop up his lopsided bookcase, Fletcher notices a memo and briefly reads it. Upon returning to his cells, he reveals to Godber that prison officer Mackay is due to leave Slade Prison to attend a course. Fletcher makes a sly bet with Mr. Mackay that he can use astrology to predict his future and MacKay rebukes him for having the audacity to try to bet with him in front of the impressionable Godber (he accepts the bet though). After he departs a few days later, the prisoners rejoice and look forward to an easier time in the prison. However, Fletcher breaks the mood when he discovers that Mackay's replacement, Mr. Wainwright, is a harsh prison officer that he had encountered before at Brixton prison.

Wainwright soon bullies the prisoners while on duty, including forcing Godber to clean spilled mashed potatoes from his shoe. Fletcher, whom he remembers, receives a worse punishment when Wainwright purposely treads on Fletcher's hand while he is cleaning floors. Fletcher and Godber are later visited by prison officer Barrowclough, while moaning about Wainwright, and discover that Barrowclough is being transferred to the prison farm on Wainwright's instructions. Although Godber suggests he toughens up, Barrowclough's gentle nature makes him refuse to do so. After he leaves, Fletcher decides to arrange for something to sabotage Wainwright's position at the prison.

The next day, Fletcher has McLaren and Godber start a fight during lunch hour, under the claim that the food is not fit for consumption. The resulting chaos causes the prison guards to secure the prison and attempt to defuse the situation in the dinner hall. When Wainwright fails to quell the riot, Fletcher meets with the governor and convinces him to have Barrowclough end the situation. Rather timidly, Barrowclough agrees and meekly tells the men to stop fighting, clean up their mess and report back to their cells. Because of their respect for him, the prisoners comply without hesitation. Following the riot, Wainwright returns to Brixton in disgrace, while Mackay returns from his course, intent on enforcing a new, tougher regime. Despite his threat, the prisoners greet his return with a chorus of "For He's a Jolly Good Fellow", which he discreetly appreciates.

== Episode cast ==
Actor	Role
Ronnie Barker	Norman Stanley Fletcher
Brian Wilde	Mr Barrowclough
Fulton Mackay	Mr Mackay
Richard Beckinsale	Lennie Godber
Peter Jeffrey	Mr Wainwright
Philip Madoc	Williams
Sam Kelly	Warren
Tony Osoba	McLaren
Michael Barrington	Venables
Madge Hindle	Mrs Heskith
