= A Special Providence =

1969 novel by Richard Yates

- First edition
- Author: Richard Yates
- Language: English
- Publisher: Knopf
- Publication date: 1969
- Publication place: United States
- Media type: Print (Hardback & Paperback)
- ISBN: 0-312-42040-4
- OCLC: 49800424

A Special Providence is a novel by the American writer Richard Yates. First published in 1969, Yates' third book concerns the dual exploits of an awkward infantry soldier in World War II and his mother, a deluded sculptor living in New York City.

== Plot summary ==
Robert Prentice is drafted after graduating high school and enters World War II during its final days. His hopes of glory are dashed by the fact that the fighting is almost all over. He proves to be an incompetent soldier and soon spends time in an infirmary with pneumonia. When he returns to his unit he continues to struggle but finally achieves a kind of acceptance.

This narrative is interspersed with scenes from his childhood viewed from the perspective of his mother, Alice Prentice. She spends Robert's childhood moving from place to place mainly within New York accruing increasingly larger debts as her sculpting earns less and less money. She increasingly slips into despair as the novel ends and Robert decides not to return home.

== Reception ==
Zadie Smith described the novel as being "like Breakfast At Tiffany's spliced with All Quiet On The Western Front. Impossible to paraphrase, wonderful to read."
