= Revolutionary Road =

1961 novel by Richard Yates

- First edition
- Author: Richard Yates
- Language: English
- Genre: Tragedy
- Published: March 1, 1961 by Little, Brown
- Publication place: United States
- OCLC: 171266

Revolutionary Road is the debut novel by the American author Richard Yates. It was a finalist for the National Book Award in 1962, along with Catch-22 and The Moviegoer. When published by Atlantic-Little, Brown in 1961, it received critical acclaim, and The New York Times reviewed it as "beautifully crafted ... a remarkable and deeply troubling book." In 2005, the novel was chosen by TIME as one of the 100 best English-language novels from 1923 to the present.

The novel is critical of 1950s suburban life on the U.S. East Coast. When DeWitt Henry and Geoffrey Clark interviewed Yates for the Winter 1972 issue of literary journal Ploughshares, Yates detailed the title's subtext:

I think I meant it more as an indictment of American life in the 1950s. Because during the fifties there was a general lust for conformity all over this country, by no means only in the suburbs—a kind of blind, desperate clinging to safety and security at any price.

A film adaptation of the book, starring Leonardo DiCaprio, Kate Winslet, and Kathy Bates, directed by Sam Mendes, and written by Justin Haythe, was released in 2008.

== Plot summary ==
Set in 1955, the novel focuses on the hopes and aspirations of Frank and April Wheeler, self-assured Connecticut suburbanites who see themselves as very different from their neighbors in the Revolutionary Hill Estates. In the opening scene, April stars in an embarrassingly bad amateur dramatic production of The Petrified Forest. After the performance, Frank and April have a fight on the side of the highway, and Frank later begins an affair with his office colleague Maureen Grube.

Seeking to break out of their suburban rut (and consequently blaming herself for all of Frank's "problems"), April convinces Frank they should move to Paris, where she will work and support him while he realizes his vague ambition to be something other than an office worker. The promise of France brings the two together in love and excitement again, and Frank seemingly ends his relationship with Maureen. While April sees the emigration as an opportunity to escape their bland environment, Frank's plans are more driven by vanity of his own intelligence, which April panders to. When the dull and prim neighbor Mrs. Givings begins bringing her "insane" son John around to the Wheelers' house for regular lunches, John's honest and erratic condemnation of his mother's suburban lifestyle strikes a chord with the Wheelers, particularly Frank.

Their plans to leave the United States begin to crumble when April conceives their third child, and Frank begins to identify with his mundane job when the prospect of a promotion arises. After arguing over the possibility of aborting the pregnancy, Frank tries to manipulate April into seeking psychiatric help for her troubled childhood. April, overwhelmed by the situation, suffers something of an identity crisis and sleeps with her neighbor Shep Campbell, while Frank resurrects his relationship with Maureen. Having attempted to self-abort her pregnancy, April is rushed to the hospital where she dies from blood loss. Frank, scarred by the ordeal and feeling deep guilt over the outcome, is left a hollow shell of a man. Parenting duties are largely shifted to his brother and sister-in-law, with Frank visiting on weekends. Thus, the Wheeler children's youths begin to mirror the youth of their mother, who was primarily brought up by a slew of relatives while her parents visited infrequently.

== Themes ==
In the October 1999 issue of the Boston Review, Yates was quoted on his central theme: "If my work has a theme, I suspect it is a simple one: that most human beings are inescapably alone, and therein lies their tragedy." For all their personal hopes and dreams, Frank and April are unable to communicate them to each other; this syndrome is also seen in the other characters, Shep and Milly Campbell, and Mr. and Mrs. Givings. The Wheelers' frustrations and yearnings for something better represent the tattered remnants of the American Dream.

== Literary significance ==
Stewart O'Nan probed the neglect of Yates in "The Lost World of Richard Yates: How the Great Writer of the Age of Anxiety Disappeared from Print".

Prominent authors, such as William Styron, Kurt Vonnegut, and Tennessee Williams, wrote blurbs that appeared on the dust jacket.

== Film adaptation ==
Screenwriter Justin Haythe adapted the novel for filming. Directed by Sam Mendes, the film stars Leonardo DiCaprio, Kate Winslet, Kathy Bates, and Michael Shannon. It opened December 26, 2008 to generally favorable reviews and grossed $76 million at the box office.
